= Alosta =

Defunct settlement in California

- Former settlement
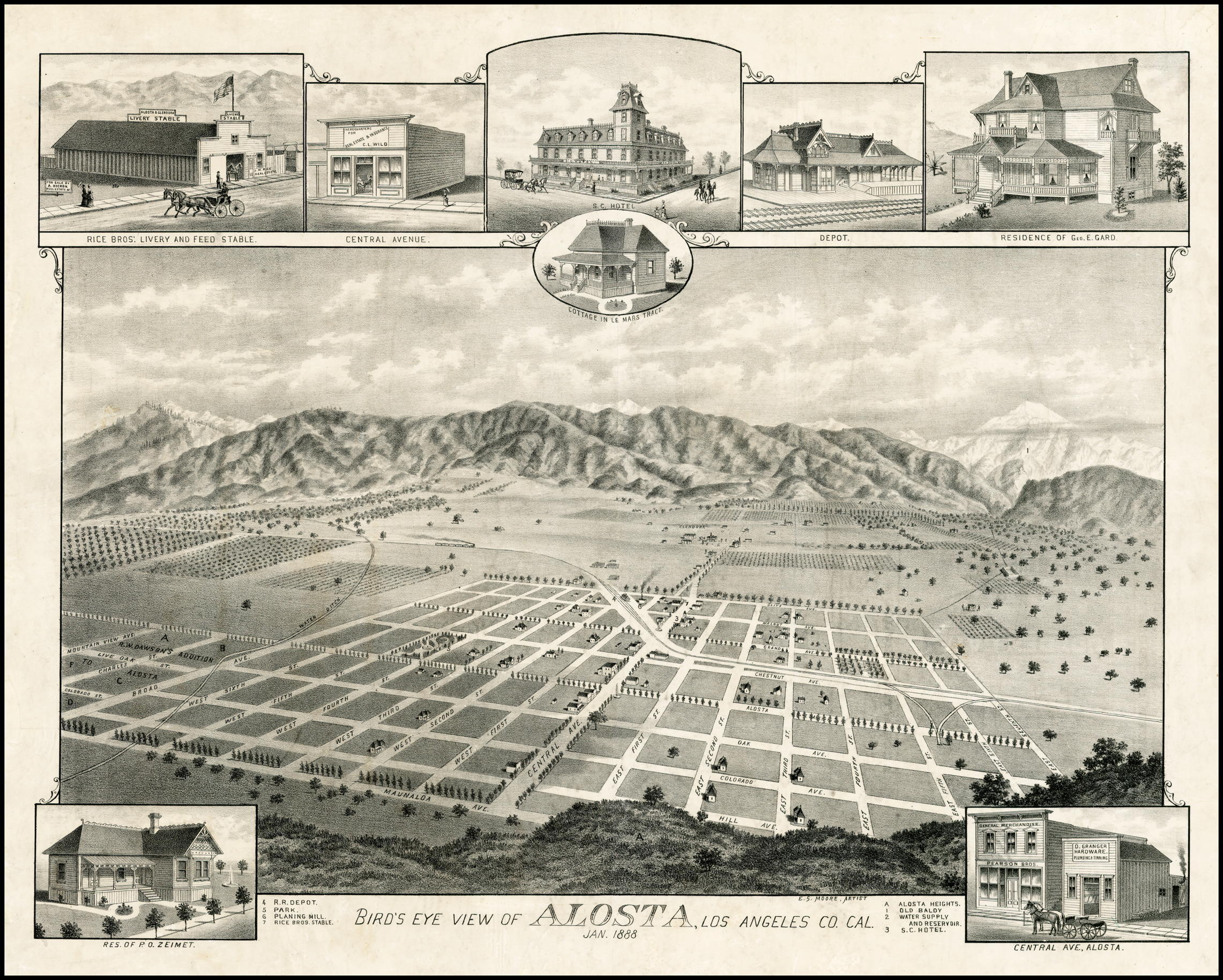
- 1888 Bird's-eye view of Alosta, depicting the planned streets and notable buildings

- Location in California Alosta (the United States)
- Coordinates: 34.1204°N 117.8623°W
- Country: United States
- State: California
- County: Los Angeles
- Founded: Early 1887
- Annexed into Glendora: circa 1911
- Founder: George E. Gard
- Named for: Anna Losta Fuller
- Elevation: 650 ft (198 m)

Alosta is a former settlement in Los Angeles County, California, founded by Major George E. Gard in early 1887 near the peak of the Southern California real estate boom of the 1880s. Originally established shortly before its rival, neighboring Glendora, Alosta briefly flourished due to aggressive land sales and infrastructure investment. Following the collapse of the Southern California real estate market in late 1888, Alosta declined rapidly and was formally incorporated into Glendora at the time of its incorporation in 1911.

== History ==
In 1886, Major George E. Gard, previously LAPD Chief of Police and Sheriff of Los Angeles County, purchased land in the speculative community of Gladstone, southwest of the future Alosta townsite. He soon shifted his attention northeast, acquiring approximately 320 acres to establish a new town called "Alosta" in early 1887. Gard founded the Alosta Land and Water Company along with partners F. M. Underwood and S. Washburne, investing roughly $25,000 to develop essential water infrastructure from Little Dalton Canyon.

The name "Alosta" honored Anna Losta Fuller, the daughter of Gard's associate Harrison Fuller. Initial land sales in March 1887 proved highly successful, quickly surpassing $160,000. Gard actively promoted Alosta, personally funding construction of the Southern California Hotel, a dance hall, residences, a lumber yard, and notably, a saloon.

The presence of alcohol and leisure establishments in Alosta contrasted sharply with Glendora immediately to the north, where founder George Dexter Whitcomb, a devout Methodist, explicitly banned the sale and consumption of alcohol. This fundamental difference underscored a bitter rivalry between the two towns, vividly demonstrated by the deliberate misalignment of streets north and south of Ada Avenue, manifesting the personal and cultural tensions between Gard and Whitcomb.

Although initially prosperous, Alosta could not withstand the collapse of the Southern California real estate bubble in late 1888. By 1889 the community was faltering – fewer than 24 families remained in Alosta – while Glendora thrived with around 300 residents and continued development. Lots in Alosta that had commanded high prices during the boom became largely idle or reverted to agricultural use. Gard himself remained in the area until his death in 1904, tending to citrus and deciduous fruit orchards on his remaining properties. One notable landmark of Alosta that survived over a century was the Fuller residence (the family of Harrison Fuller) at the corner of Citrus Avenue and Alosta Avenue (now Route 66), which stood from 1886 until 1987 and marked the western edge of the old town area. It was torn down by Azusa Pacific University to make way for the Munson Chapel, the Ronald Center, and the Warren Music Center.

Alosta never regained its initial momentum, gradually merging into the expanding city of Glendora, which formally incorporated and annexed the former Alosta townsite upon incorporation in 1911.

== Geography ==
Alosta was located in the eastern San Gabriel Valley, immediately south of the Atchison, Topeka and Santa Fe Railway station (now site of Glendora station) that George Whitcomb successfully lobbied to place adjacent to his own land holdings to the north in what became Glendora. The town's streets were arranged in a traditional grid pattern, with its primary east-west thoroughfare initially named Chestnut Avenue, later renamed Alosta Avenue.

From 1926 to 1934,U.S. Route 66 ran through Glendora along what is now Foothill Boulevard, north of what was once Alosta. In 1934, Route 66 was realigned southward onto Alosta Avenue. The entirety of Route 66 was decommissioned in 1985. Alosta Avenue retained its local name until 2003, when it was renamed Route 66 in recognition of the road’s enduring international fame.

== Legacy ==
Although Alosta ceased to exist as a separate town by the early 20th century, its name and layout continue to shape the southern portion of present-day Glendora. The misalignment of north-south streets at Ada Avenue remains a visible reminder of the rivalry between the two towns during the land boom of the 1880s. While Alosta never developed a lasting municipal identity, its absorption into Glendora illustrates a broader pattern common to Southern California, in which speculative boomtowns either failed outright or were incorporated into more stable neighboring communities as economic conditions shifted in the late 19th and early 20th centuries.

The history of Alosta is documented and preserved by local institutions, including the Glendora Historical Society and the Glendora Public Library's Community Archive, which hold maps, photographs, and contemporary newspaper accounts relating to the town’s brief existence. Academic and local historical publications have also examined Alosta’s role within the wider Southern California real estate boom and its rapid collapse following the bust of 1888. Several businesses in the area use Alosta in their names, either in tribute to the former community or as a relic of the former street name.
