= George Dexter Whitcomb =

California businessman (1834–1914)

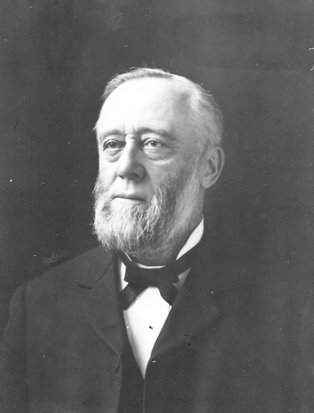
- Born: May 13, 1834; Brandon, Vermont, U.S.
- Died: June 21, 1914 (aged 80); Glendora, California, U.S.
- Occupations: Manufacturer, entrepreneur, city founder
- Known for: Founder of Geo D. Whitcomb Company, Founder of Glendora
- Spouse: Leadora Bennett Whitcomb (1839–1929)

George Dexter Whitcomb (May 13, 1834 – June 21, 1914) was an American industrialist and entrepreneur known for founding the Geo D. Whitcomb Company, later known as the Whitcomb Locomotive Works. He is also recognized as the founder of Glendora, California.

== Early life ==
Whitcomb was born in Brandon, Vermont, in 1834. He spent his early years in New England, where he gained experience in manufacturing and business practices that would serve him well later in life. The Whitcomb family relocated to Kent, Ohio, during his youth, and he later attended business college in Akron, Ohio, financing his education by working for the Panhandle Railroad as a ticketing agent and telegrapher.

== Career ==
In the late 1850s, Whitcomb moved to Saint Paul, Minnesota, where he managed a company trading with frontier communities. After marrying Leadora Bennett in 1859, the couple settled in Chicago, Illinois. During the Civil War, Whitcomb served the Union Army by providing critical railroad supplies, primarily ties and timber.

After the war, Whitcomb worked as General Purchasing Agent for the Panhandle Railroad and later founded the Geo D. Whitcomb Company in Chicago, which specialized in manufacturing mining machinery and equipment. He invented early mechanized coal mining machines and eventually shifted the company's focus to industrial locomotives, pioneering the use of gasoline-powered locomotives for mining applications. By 1907, the company's primary manufacturing operations were relocated to Rochelle, Illinois, and it became internationally recognized as the Whitcomb Locomotive Works.

== Founding of Glendora ==
In 1884, Whitcomb moved to Southern California, attracted for health reasons by the region's favorable climate and development potential. In 1885 purchased approximately 400 acres of land from the old Rancho Azusa de Dalton at the base of the San Gabriel Mountains. In March 1887, he subdivided half this land and, with business partners bringing 100 additional acres, founded the new community of Glendora, naming the town by combining "glen," referring to its scenic location, with his wife's name, Leadora. Whitcomb actively promoted the town, quickly selling 300 lots on the first day of public auction, April 1, 1887. He personally donated land and funds for the town’s first school and Methodist church, oversaw the planting of trees, and played a pivotal role in bringing railroad service to the community. Whitcomb actively promoted Glendora's early growth by lobbying to have the route of the Los Angeles and San Gabriel Valley Railroad (later purchased by the Santa Fe Railway) pass north of the South Hills, ensuring direct rail service to Glendora. His previous relationships with railroad officials were instrumental in successfully rerouting the railway to serve the newly established town directly, greatly enhancing its economic prospects and attractiveness to new settlers.

== Later years and legacy ==
Whitcomb remained deeply involved in Glendora's development, advocating for infrastructure improvements such as the paving of Foothill Boulevard and the establishment of the Pacific Electric interurban line to Glendora. He also served on the first board of trustees for the Glendora School District.

George Dexter Whitcomb died at his home in Glendora on June 21, 1914, at the age of 80. He was buried in Inglewood Park Cemetery. Whitcomb’s legacy persists both through the continued prominence of Glendora and through innovations made by the Whitcomb Locomotive Works, which was eventually acquired by Baldwin Locomotive Works in 1931. Local landmarks, including Whitcomb Avenue, Whitcomb High School, and the Whitcomb Courtyard at the Glendora Historical Society, honor his contributions.

George Whitcomb's lobbying efforts in the 1880s to bring the Los Angeles and San Gabriel Valley Railroad to Glendora echoed into the 21st century. Because of his work back then, passenger rail service returned to Glendora, after a break of 74 years, with the opening of the Los Angeles County Metropolitan Transportation Authority's Metro A-Line Glendora station on September 19, 2025.
