= Suzanne Muchnic =

American art historian

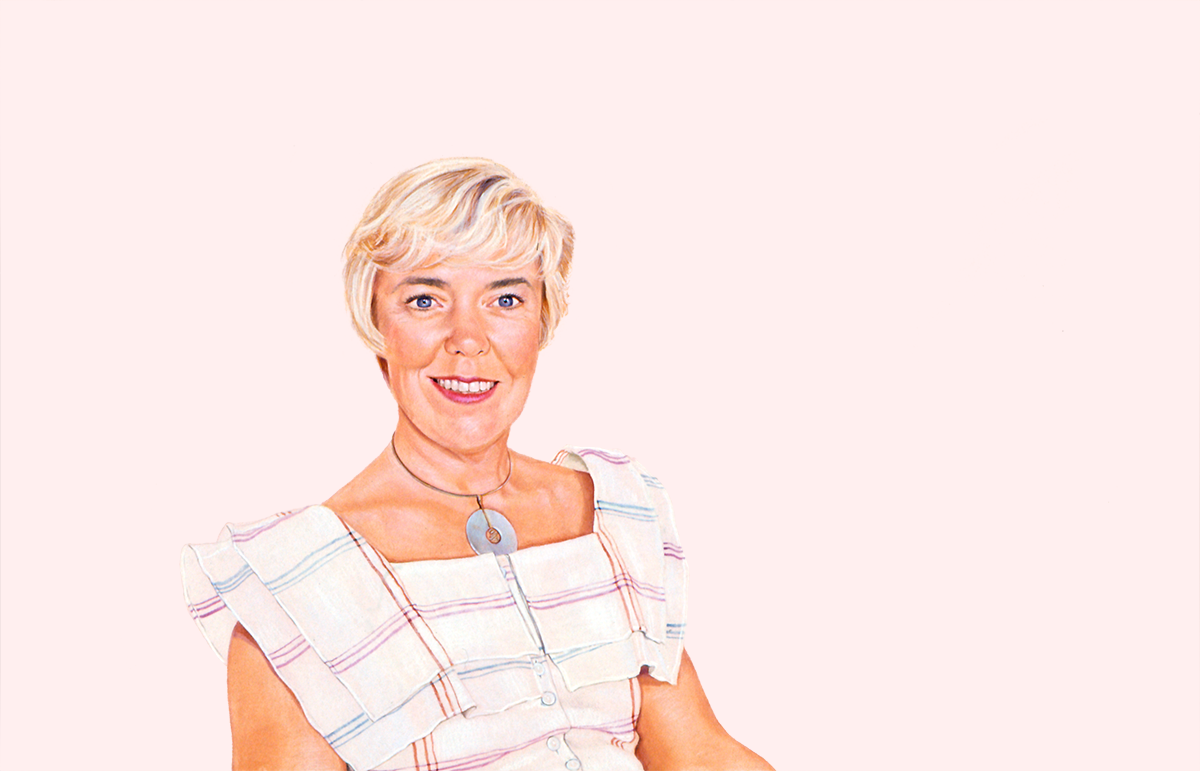
- Portrait of Muchnic by Sylvia Shap, 1984
- Born: 1940 (age 85–86)
- Occupation: Art Writer
- Known for: Art criticism and art reporting. Author of Odd Man In: Norton Simon and the Pursuit of Culture (1998), and LACMA So Far: Portrait of a Museum in the Making (2015)

Suzanne Muchnic (born 1940) is an art writer who was a staff art reporter and art critic at the Los Angeles Times for 31 years. She has also written books on artists, collectors, and museums.

== Academic career ==
Muchnic is a graduate of Scripps College and received a Distinguished Alumna Award in 1987. She graduated from Claremont Graduate School (now Claremont Graduate University) in 1963 and was subsequently inducted into its Alumni Hall of Fame in 2000. In 2010, Muchnic was a Warhol Foundation Arts Writing Workshop leader and mentor. She has lectured on art history and art criticism at University of Southern California, Los Angeles City College and Claremont Graduate University.

On the importance of her Scripps College education to her career, Muchnic said: "It's impossible to imagine working as an art critic, reporter, and feature writer for a major urban newspaper without the kind of background Scripps provided. Just as no academic course stood alone in my Scripps years, no art world event can be isolated from the larger cultural sphere. My editors at the Los Angeles Times are under the delusion that I am a 'special' writer–one who concentrates on a specific subject and, presumably, has a narrow viewpoint. Thanks to Scripps, I know that I am a generalist. My endlessly intriguing challenge is to create a context and bring a broad perspective to the complex processes of creating, interpreting, exhibiting, conserving, collecting, and marketing art."

== Art writer ==
Aside from her decades long career as an art critic and art writer for the Los Angeles Times (1978-2009), Muchnic was the Southern California editor of Artweek and has published articles in ARTnews, Harper’s Bazaar, Gannett Center Journal, Arts, Picture and Photoshow.

She is the author of Odd Man In: Norton Simon and the Pursuit of Culture, a biography of the California industrialist and art collector, published by the University of California Press in 1998. Muchnic’s biography of a Los Angeles painter, Helen Lundeberg: Poetry Space Silence, was published by the Feitelson/Lundeberg Art Foundation and Louis Stern Fine Arts in 2014. The Huntington Library Press published her most recent book in 2015: LACMA So Far: Portrait of a Museum in the Making, which tells the story of how the Los Angeles County Museum of Art became a major West Coast cultural center.

== Art critic ==
As a reporter, Muchnic took Los Angeles Times readers to all corners of the world to give art its proper context. From Moscow in 1988, she reported on the Soviet Union’s first auction of long-repressed Russian avant-garde and contemporary Soviet art, conducted by Sotheby's, introducing many works of art to an international audience. She also traveled to the world’s oldest continuously operating Christian monastery, Saint Catherine's Monastery in Sinai, to write about the ancient home of icons and other artworks lent to an exhibition at the Getty Museum. She also accompanied a Getty Conservation Institute project to China to report on the restoration of the world’s richest trove of ancient Buddhist wall paintings and sculptures in a complex of art-filled caves along a riverbed in the Gobi Desert.

About her experience reviewing art for the Los Angeles Times, she said "I was primarily interested in contemporary art when I started writing, but over the years I developed a much deeper knowledge and love of art history. One of the best things about my job was that it was an ongoing education."

== Recognition ==
Her art journalism earned her a Distinguished Alumna Award from Scripps College and Claremont Graduate University. She was awarded a first prize for arts and entertainment reporting from the Greater Los Angeles Press Club. Her book, Odd Man In: Norton Simon and the Pursuit of Culture, won the 2002 Donald Pflueger Local History Award of the Historical Society of Southern California. This award-winning biography tells the story of how the wealthy entrepreneur Norton Simon (1907–1993), enriched the West Coast art world with his collection of art.

== Bibliography ==
=== Books ===
- Muchnic, Suzanne (1998). Odd Man In: Norton Simon and the Pursuit of Culture. Oakland, CA: University of California Press. ISBN 978-0-520-20643-4.
- Muchnic, Suzanne (2014). Helen Lundeberg: Poetry Space Silence. West Hollywood, CA & Orange, CA: Louis Stern Fine Arts & Feitelson/Lundeberg Art Foundation. ISBN 978-0-983-78713-6 – via library.nga.gov.
- Muchnic, Suzanne (2015). LACMA So Far: Portrait of a Museum in the Making. San Marino, CA: Huntington Library Press. ISBN 978-0-873-28266-6.

=== Selected published articles and reviews ===
- "Hitler’s Sordid Little Art Show: How a footnote to the Third Reich’s brutal history became LACMA’s 'Degenerate Art: The Fate of the Avant-Garde in Nazi Germany'"; in Los Angeles Times, February 10, 1991.
- "Saving Treasures the Getty Way : The Conservation Institute uses a collaborative approach to encourage restoration and preservation, but the real goal is to prevent deterioration of art and historic sites in the first place"; in Los Angeles Times, July 11, 1993.
- "A Gleaming New Showcase for the Acropolis: Athens finally has a place for the Elgin Marbles, if they’re ever repatriated, plus statues and other works from the ancient Greek site"; in Los Angeles Times, January 24, 2010.
- "A False Sense of Security: Even as artists embrace environmental practices, they ignore or remain uninformed about the toxic materials in their own studios"; in ARTnews, October 2010.
- "Beyond Tattoos: The Art of Body Adornment in Africa"; in Los Angeles Review of Books, February 3, 2013.
- "Under the Microscope: In museums, schools, and research facilities, scientists and artists are swapping methods to illuminate natural phenomena and solve global problems"; in ARTnews, March 2013.
