= Glendora station =

Light rail station in Glendora, California

Glendora
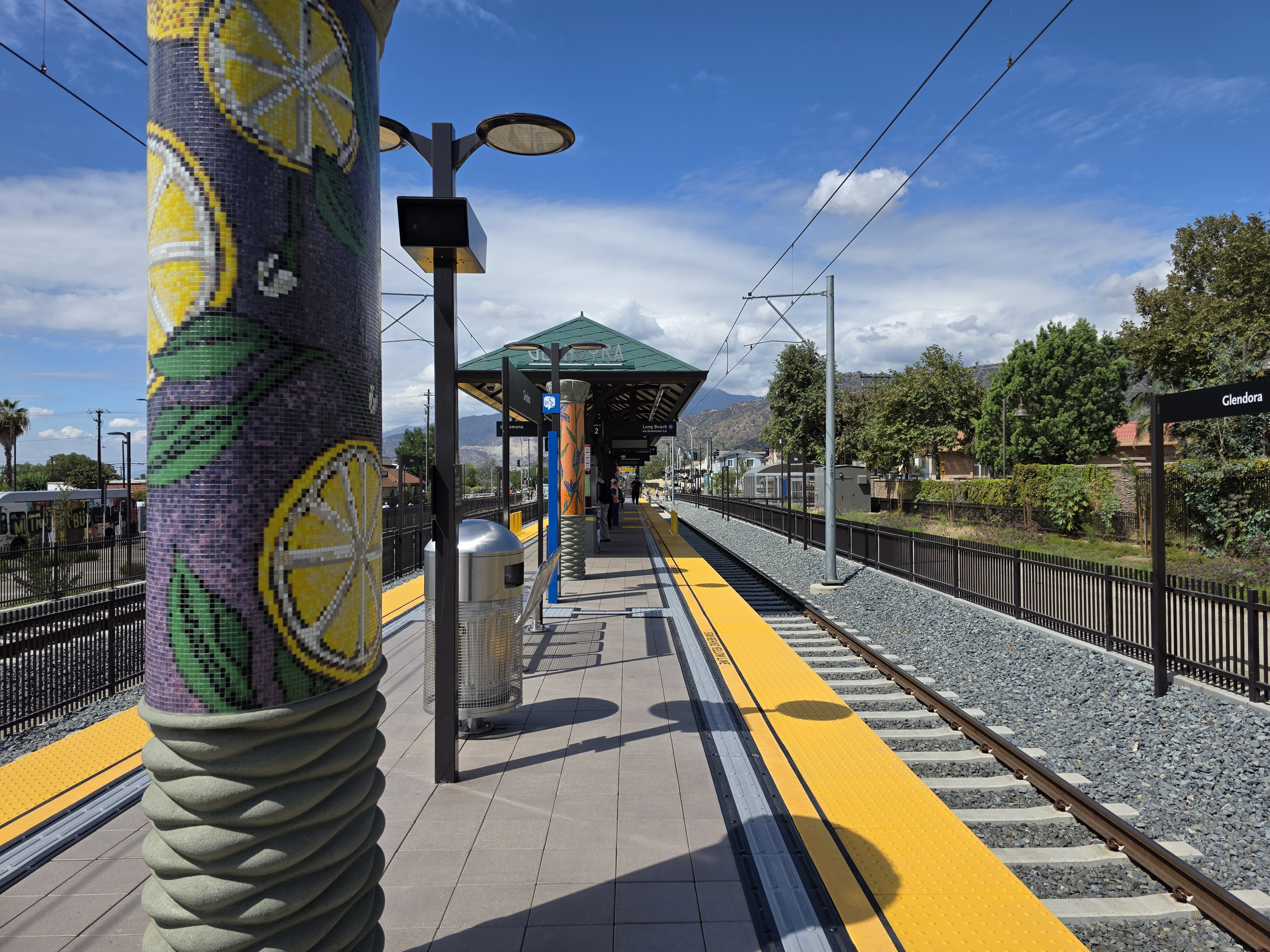
- Glendora station platform on opening day, September 19, 2025

General information
- Coordinates: 34.1323°N 117.8667°W
- Owner: Los Angeles Metro
- Platforms: 1 island platform
- Tracks: 2
- Connections: Foothill Transit; Glendora Transportation Division

Construction
- Parking: 298 spaces
- Accessible: Yes

History
- Opened: September 19, 2025; 11 months ago

Passengers
- FY 2026: 480 (avg. wkdy boardings)

Services
Preceding station	Metro Rail	Following station
APU/Citrus College toward Long Beach	A Line	San Dimas toward Pomona
Former services (at AT&SF station)
Preceding station	Atchison, Topeka and Santa Fe Railway	Following station
Azusa toward Los Angeles	Main Line Via Pasadena, Pomona	San Dimas toward Chicago
Location

Glendora station is an at-grade light rail station in the Los Angeles Metro Rail system. The station is located near the intersection of South Vermont Avenue and Ada Avenue along the Pasadena Subdivision right of way in Glendora, California at the site of Glendora's original 1887 station on the Los Angeles and San Gabriel Valley Railroad. It is served by the A Line. As the first station on the Foothill Extension Phase 2B to Pomona project, it was officially dedicated with a ceremony on June 5, 2025, featuring regional politicians and a celebration for the general public. It opened on September 19, 2025.

The Glendora A Line station has a single island platform and four TAP to exit gates with validators, two at the Vermont Avenue entrance/exit and two at the Glendora Avenue entrance/exit.

== Service ==
=== Hours and frequency ===
A Line service hours are from approximately 4:30 a.m. and 11:45 p.m. daily. Trains operate every 8 minutes during peak hours, Monday to Friday. Trains run every 10 minutes, during midday on weekdays and weekends, from 9:00 a.m. to 7:00 p.m. Night and early morning service is approximately every 20 minutes every day.

=== Connections ===
As of September 19, 2024, the following connections are available:

- Foothill Transit: 284
- Glendora Transportation Division: A Line Shuttle

== History ==
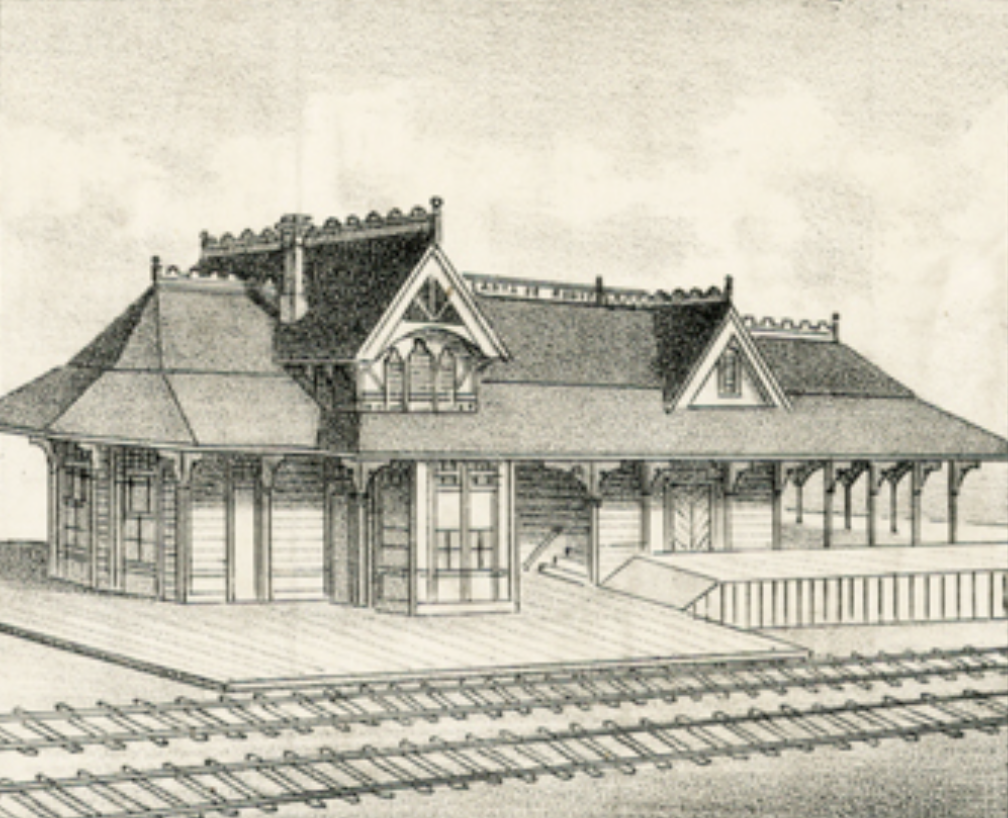
Etching of (1887) Glendora Santa Fe Railroad Station (cropped from Alosta-Glendora map, 1888)

=== Background ===
The new Metro Glendora station is located at the site of the original Los Angeles and San Gabriel Valley Railroad station, which first opened in May 1887, a month after Glendora's founding. The arrival of this railway connected Glendora to broader markets, spurring growth and significantly contributing to the establishment and economic development of the city. The presence of the station helped early Glendora weather the storm of the collapse of the Southern California real estate boom of the 1880s.

City founder George D. Whitcomb played a crucial role in bringing rail to Glendora, leveraging his connections with the railroad industry to successfully lobby for the rail line to run north of the South Hills, where it would better serve Glendora's newly established town center rather than the more southerly Charter Oak area as was originally planned.

Between 1907 and 1951, Glendora was also served by the Pacific Electric Railway's Monrovia–Glendora Line, providing regular passenger service connecting downtown Glendora (now known as “The Village”) to the Pacific Electric Building at Sixth and Main in Downtown Los Angeles. After the discontinuation of Pacific Electric passenger service on September 30, 1951, Glendora was without passenger rail service for over seven decades.

=== Original station (1887–1962) ===
The original Glendora station of the Los Angeles and San Gabriel Valley Railroad, later part of the Atchison, Topeka and Santa Fe Railway, opened in May 1887. It became a critical factor in Glendora's early economic growth and community development. In the 1940s, the Victorian station was rebuilt in a Streamline Moderne architectural style (similar in appearance to the still-standing historic Azusa depot), reflecting contemporary trends, such as the decline of passenger service in favor of cargo shipments, including from Glendora's agriculture industry. However, by the mid-1950s, the need for freight also declined as Glendora's citrus groves gave way to new suburban housing developments. With the popularity of cars and the local citrus industry on the wane, the Santa Fe Railroad stopped serving Glendora in 1960. The original station was fully decommissioned and demolished in 1962.

=== Artwork ===
Public artwork includes Glendora Home: A Slice of Sunshine (2025), by Michael Hillman. Eight large-scale oval columns are located on the platform and two at each of the station entry plazas. The columns are embellished with glass tiles in brilliant colors. Themes depicted include citrus, the foothills, water, irrigation, the bougainvillea plant, and the local brodiaea filifolia flower.
