= Glendora Public Market =

- Location: Glendora, California
- Coordinates: 34.107047147205556°N 117.84600640111984°W
- Address: 905 E Arrow Highway
- Opened: 26 September 2020; 6 years ago
- Floor area: 18,932 square feet (1,758.8 m^{2})
- Floors: One
- Website: glendorapublicmarket.com

Glendora Public Market is a food hall located in the San Gabriel Valley community of Glendora, California. Glendora Public Market opened on 26 September 2020. It is located on Route 66 in the former premises of the historic Wonder Bread factory, which was built in 1948 as a Helms Bakery and was saved from planned demolition by adaptive reuse. The market has a square footage of over 18,932 square feet (1,758.8 m^{2}), and houses several notable eateries, including Jinya Ramen Bar. As of October 2020, it is the single largest food hall in the San Gabriel Valley.

== See also ==
- Food hall
- Glendora, California
