= Colby Fire =

2014 wildfire in Southern California

- Part of the 2014 California wildfires
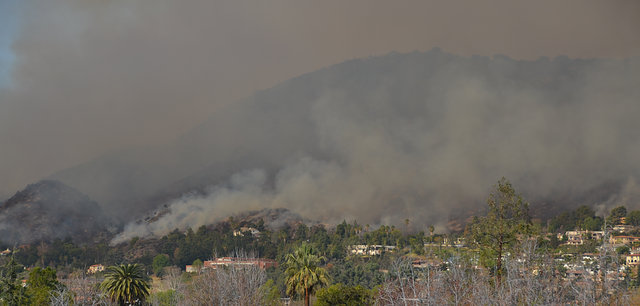
- Colby Fire, as seen from Glendora.
- Date: January 16, 2014 –; January 26, 2014
- Location: Glendora, Los Angeles County, California
- Coordinates: 34.159°N 117.843°W

Statistics
- Burned area: 1,952 acres (790 ha)

Impacts
- Injuries: 1
- Structures lost: 5 residences; 10 outbuildings

Ignition
- Cause: Escaped campfire

Map
- Location of fire in Los Angeles metropolitan area.

The Colby Fire was a wildfire in the Angeles National Forest. It was ignited along the Colby Truck Trail in the San Gabriel Mountains in northern Los Angeles County, United States. The fire started on January 16, 2014, and eventually burned 1,992 acres. On January 25, the Colby Fire had burned 1,962 acres, and was 98% contained. The fire, which was fanned by strong Santa Ana winds, destroyed five homes, injured one person, and forced the evacuation of 3,600 people at its peak.

Three men in their early 20s were arrested for recklessly starting a fire, and have allegedly admitted starting an illegal campfire that blew out of control. They will face federal charges of unlawfully causing timber to burn. Bail has been set at $500,000 for each of them "due to the seriousness of the crime, as well as the high cost of damaged property and resources to fight the fire." One of the men, a transient, has been placed in a residential drug treatment facility. Two of the men were convicted of lighting and failing to control an illegal campfire; the third person is scheduled to go to trial later in 2014.

January fires are unusual in Southern California, but there was little rainfall in the area leading up to the fire, which led to a "red flag" fire danger situation. Warm temperatures, low humidity, and an excess of dry brush in the foothills around Glendora (which had not burned significantly since the 1960s) encouraged the growth of the fire.

== See also ==
- 2014 California wildfires
