= Glendora Unified School District =

School district in California, United States

Location
- 500 North Loraine Ave. Glendora, California 91741 United States
- Coordinates: 34.1442°N 117.8446°W

District information
- NCES District ID: 0615270

Other information
- Website: www.glendora.k12.ca.us

Glendora Unified School District is a public school district based in Glendora, Los Angeles County, California, United States.

The school district covers northern and central Glendora. The school board is composed of five members, at-large, elected to a four-year term. The elections are currently held on a Tuesday after the first Monday in November of odd-numbered years until the 2017 election, then they will switch to even-numbered years starting with the November 2020 election to coincide with the California General Election.

== Schools ==
Elementary Schools (K–5)

- Cullen Elementary School
- La Fetra Elementary School
- Sellers Elementary School
- Stanton Elementary School
- Sutherland Elementary School

Middle Schools (6–8)

- Goddard Middle School
- Sandburg Middle School

High Schools (9–12)

- Glendora High School
- Whitcomb High School

Adult Schools (Adults)

- Glendora Adult School
