= Donald H. Pflueger =

American historian (1923–1994)

Donald H. Pflueger (1923–1994) was an American historian, educator and author from Glendora, California, known for his work on the history of the San Gabriel Valley, the Pomona Valley, and the Inland Empire. His parents, the G. H. Pflueger, were early citrus ranchers, and their river rock family home is still located on the northeast corner of Pflueger Avenue and Foothill Boulevard, in Glendora.

== Background ==
Pflueger attended Pomona College and Stanford University. Known as a prolific author of local histories, he was also a professor at California State Polytechnic University, Pomona (Cal Poly Pomona), in Pomona, California. While studying at Pomona College, Pflueger decided to use his hometown as the subject of his honors thesis. The result was his first book, Glendora: The Annals of a Southern California Community, written in 1951. The book has become a local classic. Don served in the State Dept in the middle east with distinction and was a brother in ECV. He also authored Covina: Sunflowers and Subdivisions, in 1964, about the neighboring community of Covina, California. Throughout his life Pflueger continued to write other books and articles on local California history. His final book Cal Poly Pomona: A Legacy and a Mission, was published posthumously. His children donated the proceeds of its sale to an endowment in his name at Cal Poly Pomona.

Pflueger was one of the founding members of the Glendora Historical Society, in Glendora, California and received a Lifetime Achievement Award from the Society in 1990 for his contributions. He was also active in the Pomona Valley Historical Society and served on the board of directors of the Historical Society of Southern California. His contributions to local history in Los Angeles as well as Southern California led the Historical Society of Southern California to establish the Donald Pflueger Local History Award, which is presented each year to authors of outstanding publications on Los Angeles and Southern California local history. Pflueger traveled the state of California researching local sites and events of historical significance as a member of the State Historical Resources Commission.

== Publications ==
- Glendora—The Annals of Southern California Community
- The Government of California (with Hugh O. LaBounty)
- Covina—Sunflowers, Citrus, Subdivisions
- Charles C. Chapman—The Career of a Creative Californian
- California State Polytechnic University, Pomona—A Legacy and a Mission (Posthumously)
