= Glendora, California =

City in California, United States

- City
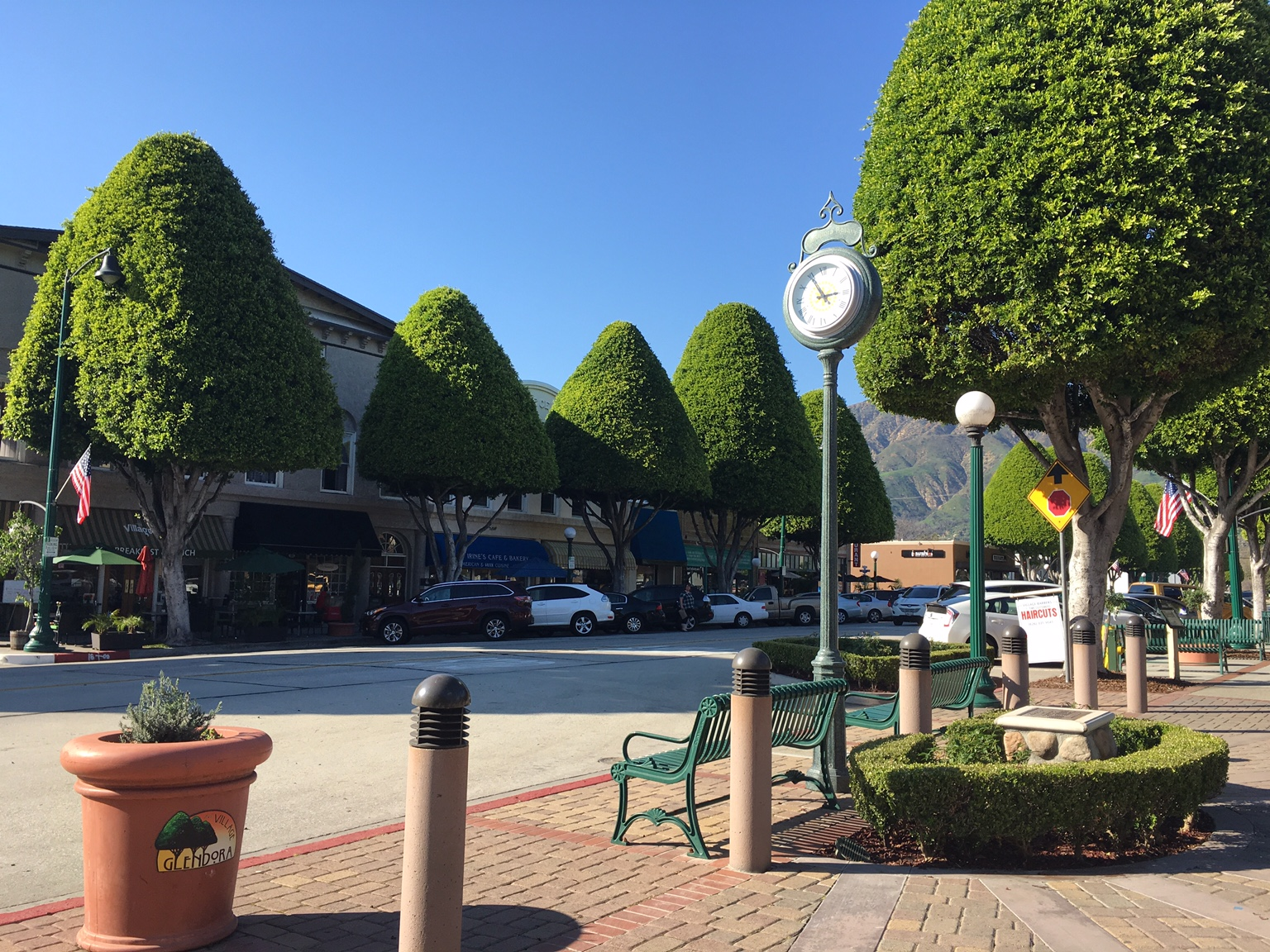
- Glendora Village with Ficus trees

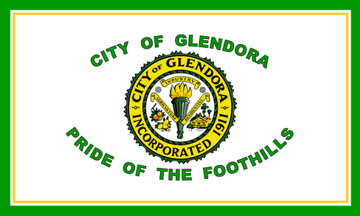
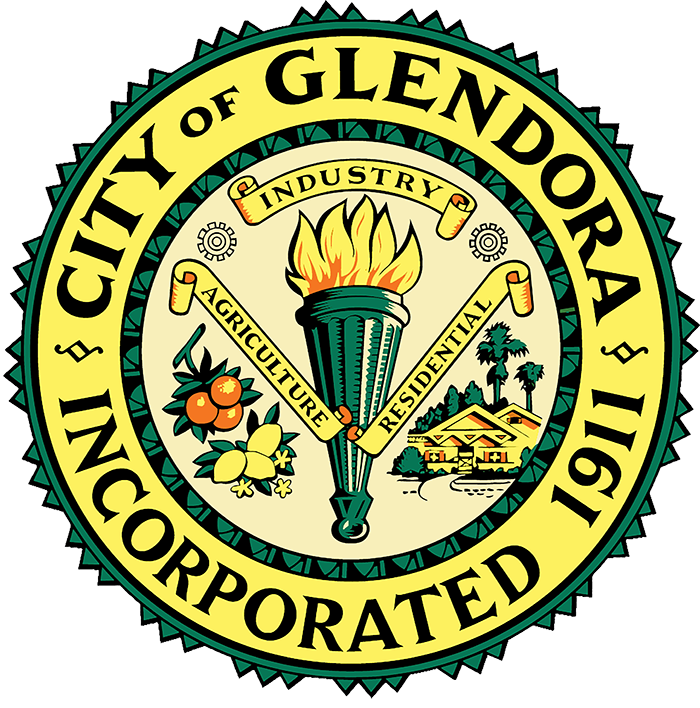
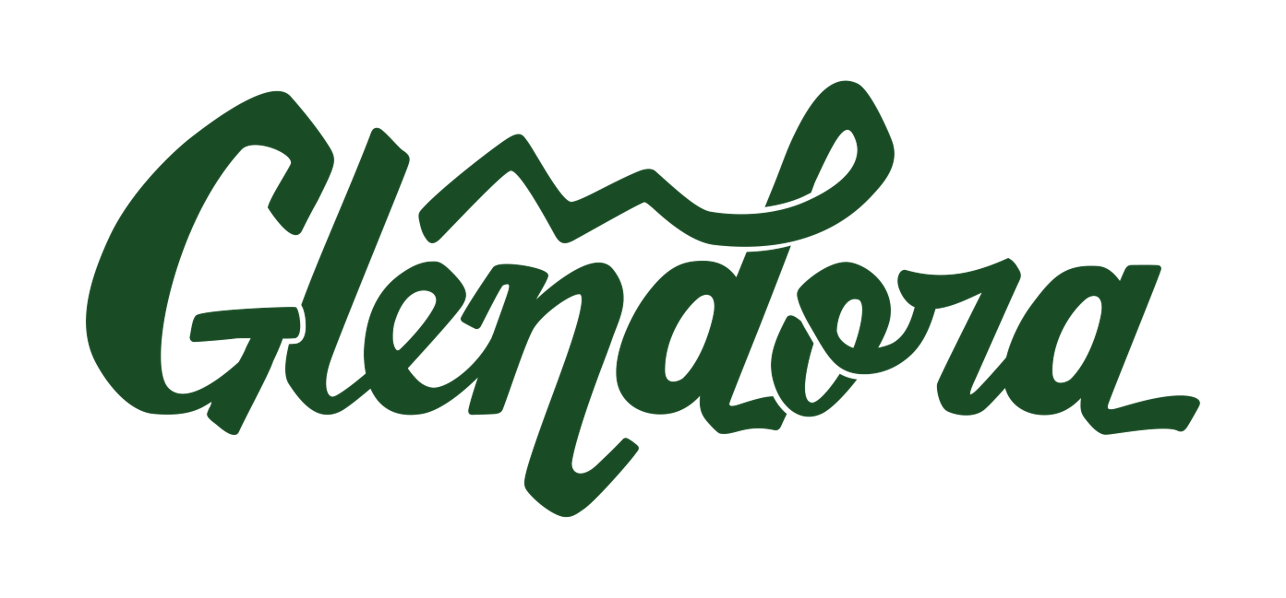
- Flag Seal Logo
- Motto: Pride of the Foothills
- Interactive map of Glendora, California
- Location in the United States Glendora, California (the United States)
- Coordinates: 34°8′10″N 117°51′55″W
- Country: United States
- State: California
- County: Los Angeles
- Founded: April 1, 1887
- Incorporated: November 13, 1911
- Named for: Leadora Bennett Whitcomb

Government
  - Mayor: David Fredendall
  - Mayor Pro Tem: Karen K Davis
  - Councilmember: Michael Allawos; Shaunna Elias; Mendell Thompson
  - City Manager: Adam Raymond

Area
  - Total: 19.66 sq mi (50.92 km^{2})
  - Land: 19.51 sq mi (50.52 km^{2})
  - Water: 0.15 sq mi (0.40 km^{2}) 0.84%
- Elevation: 774 ft (236 m)

Population (2020)
  - Total: 52,558
  - Density: 2,582/sq mi (996.9/km^{2})
- Time zone: UTC−8 (PST)
  - Summer (DST): UTC−7 (PDT)
- ZIP Codes: 91740 and 91741
- Area codes: 626, 909/840
- FIPS code: 06-30014
- GNIS feature ID: 1652713
- Website: cityofglendora.gov

Glendora is a city in the San Gabriel Valley in Los Angeles County, California, United States, 25 miles (40 km) northeast of Downtown Los Angeles. As of the 2020 census, the population of Glendora was 52,558. World-famous Route 66 runs through the city. Like many of its neighbors, Glendora was founded during the Southern California real estate boom of the 1880s.

Known as “The Pride of the Foothills", Glendora is nestled in the foothills of the San Gabriel Mountains. Its downtown area, locally known as the Glendora Village, hosts dozens of restaurants, cafes, shops, and boutiques along Glendora Avenue with many community events scheduled throughout the year.

Neighborhoods and residences in Glendora reflect the city's history and range from Queen Annes, to Folk Victorians, early 20th-century bungalows, to ranch style homes, to mid-rise multi-family residential complexes, to modern mansions. Glendora's most expensive neighborhoods contain many very large, secluded, estate homes with views across the San Gabriel Valley to Downtown Los Angeles and beyond.

Glendora is bordered by Azusa and the unincorporated community of Citrus to the west, San Dimas to the east and south, Covina and the unincorporated community of Charter Oak to the south, and the San Gabriel Mountains, including protected areas within the San Gabriel Mountains National Monument, to the north.

== History ==
=== Early inhabitants ===
The first archaeological evidence of human settlement in Glendora dates from c. 6000 BCE. Around 3500 BCE, the Takic people moved into the area. By the time Europeans arrived in present-day Los Angeles County, the Tongva, also known as the Kizh or the Gabrieleños, were the dominant group.

In the foothills and inland areas (such as present-day Glendora), Tongva settlement patterns included both permanent village sites and seasonal camps, usually located near reliable water sources like streams or springs. The nearest villages to modern Glendora were Asuksa-nga (meaning "Skunk-place") along the San Gabriel River in present-day Azusa and Duarte, and Momwamomutn-gna (meaning "Place of many springs") in present-day San Dimas. What is now Glendora was the site of seasonal camps and hunting grounds, particularly near the intermittent streams around Dalton Canyon.

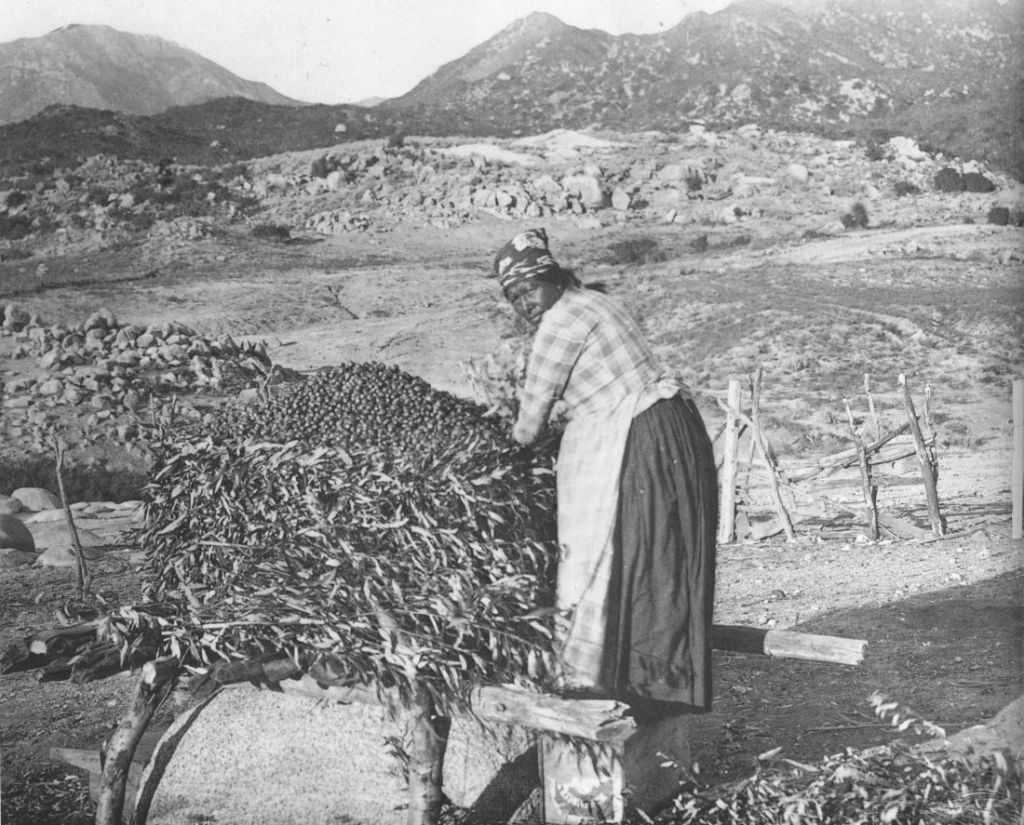
Tongva woman grinding acorns (1900), location unknown

Tongva daily life was closely tied to the land's resources. They were primarily hunters and gatherers rather than farmers. The abundant oak woodlands of the San Gabriel foothills provided acorns as a dietary staple; acorns were shelled, ground on stone mortars, and leached to make a nourishing acorn mush. Along rivers and marshes, Tongva people gathered wild seeds such as chia sage, berries, and herbs. In inland communities like the Glendora area, protein came from hunting and trapping local game like deer, rabbits, and birds. Trade with neighboring tribes was well-developed; the Tongva were notable as one of the wealthiest and most influential indigenous groups in Southern California, exchanging goods like steatite (soapstone) bowls, shells, and other items in a far-reaching trade network. This network connected them with peoples as far away as the Yokuts of the Central Valley and the tribes of the Colorado River, illustrating how Tongva economic and cultural influence extended beyond their immediate homeland.

Daily life in a Tongva village was structured around communal and familial activities. Tongva dwellings (called kich or kiiğa) were dome-shaped structures made of willow branches and thatched with tule or other grasses. These homes had a central fire pit and a smoke hole at the top for ventilation. Villages typically ranged from a few dozen to a hundred people, and early Spanish observers noted that each village was politically autonomous under its own chief, yet linked to others by kinship and language. Men and women both had important economic roles: men often did most of the hunting and fishing, while women were expert foragers and skilled in processing plant foods and weaving baskets. Both sexes wore their hair long and adorned their bodies with tattoos and paint. Clothing was minimal in the warm Southern California climate—men often wore little more than a breechcloth, and women wore skirts made of deer hide or woven fiber. In cooler weather, they draped themselves in capes or cloaks made from animal skins, and sandals woven from yucca fiber or hide protected their feet. Tongva spiritual life was rich, with ceremonies marking events like the summer solstice and communal mourning rituals for the dead. They had deep knowledge of local plants for food, medicine, and materials, reflecting a relationship with the land that was both practical and spiritual.

When the Spanish first arrived in the 1770s, the Tongva population in the entire Los Angeles Basin, including the San Gabriel Valley, is estimated to have been between 5,000 and 10,000 people.

=== Spanish period (1769–1821) ===
Following the arrival of a Spanish expedition led by Christopher Columbus to islands in what we now call the Caribbean in 1492, a dispute arose between Castille (Spain) and Portugal about which kingdom would own "new" lands discovered to the west of the Atlantic Ocean. This was resolved by the Inter caetera Papal bull from Pope Alexander VI, which divided all newly discovered lands outside Europe between the Kingdom of Portugal and the Crown of Castile, along a meridian 100 leagues (370 miles/600 kilometers) west of the Cape Verde islands. This gave Portugal most of Africa and Asia, and most of the Americas to Castille (Spain).

Although theoretically already granted this land by the Pope, Spain's colonial era in California began in 1542 when Juan Rodríguez Cabrillo became the first European to explore the area. Cabrillo claimed the entire California coast for Spain. Thereafter, Spain took no action to solidify its claims over Alta California (the present-day U.S. states of California, Nevada, and neighboring areas) for over two centuries. By the late 1760s, concerned about Russian and French interest in colonizing modern-day California, Spain began efforts to establish permanent settlements and fortifications to solidify its claims. In 1769, an expedition under Gaspar de Portolá, appointed "Governor of the Californias," commenced the founding of a network of missions, pueblos (civilian settlements), and presidios (military outposts). Junípero Serra, leader of the Franciscan missionaries, managed the religious conversion and daily activities at these missions. To strengthen the sparse colonial population, Spanish authorities allowed and encouraged non-Spanish settlers to establish themselves in California.

Spain's colonial system in California, including land grants (ranchos), missions, and presidios, followed a pattern of indirect governance and religious conversion inspired by the system used by Muslim conquerors during their rule in Spain (711–1492) and the efforts to drive them out during the Reconquista. The area of modern Glendora fell under the jurisdiction of Mission San Gabriel Arcángel, founded in 1771, which had direct ecclesiastical and administrative oversight, including managing local affairs, overseeing agricultural production, and compelling local Tongva peoples into labor under harsh, slave-like conditions. The indigenous population had no natural immunity to Old World diseases introduced by settlers, in particular small pox, or by their livestock (which brought influenza, anthrax, leptospirosis, and bovine tuberculosis), resulting in major population declines.

The nearest colonial civilian settlement to present-day Glendora was El Pueblo de Nuestra Señora la Reina de los Ángeles (present-day Los Angeles), founded in 1781. Beyond the relatively small contingents of soldiers at the pueblo and at the mission, military protection for the region was provided by presidios at San Diego (founded in 1769) and Santa Barbara (founded in 1782). Glendora during this period was sparsely populated except for free-roaming cattle and seasonal use by the dwindling population of Tongva who had not been forcibly brought to live near, and put in service of, the San Gabriel Mission.

By the end of the Spanish period (circa 1820–1821), the Tongva population of the Los Angeles Basin, including the San Gabriel Valley, had dramatically declined from an estimated 5,000–10,000 in pre-contact times to approximately 1,500 individuals, largely due to the introduction of Old World diseases, the disruption of traditional ways of life, and harsh conditions under missionization.

=== Mexican period (1821–1848) ===
After 11 years of struggle, Mexico gained independence from Spain on September 27, 1821. California remained a remote frontier territory with minimal oversight from the newly established Mexican government. Due to political instability and administrative difficulties, Mexico did not formally appoint a fully recognized governor for California until 1824, when Luis Antonio Argüello took office; however, his authority was initially limited by poor communication, political uncertainty across Mexico, and California's geographic isolation, leaving local communities largely responsible for their own governance. The management of land and settlement remained informal, with boundaries defined loosely by natural landmarks, and taxation often fulfilled through contributions of livestock or goods rather than uniform cash payments. This informal governance set the stage for significant challenges when California later transitioned to American rule.

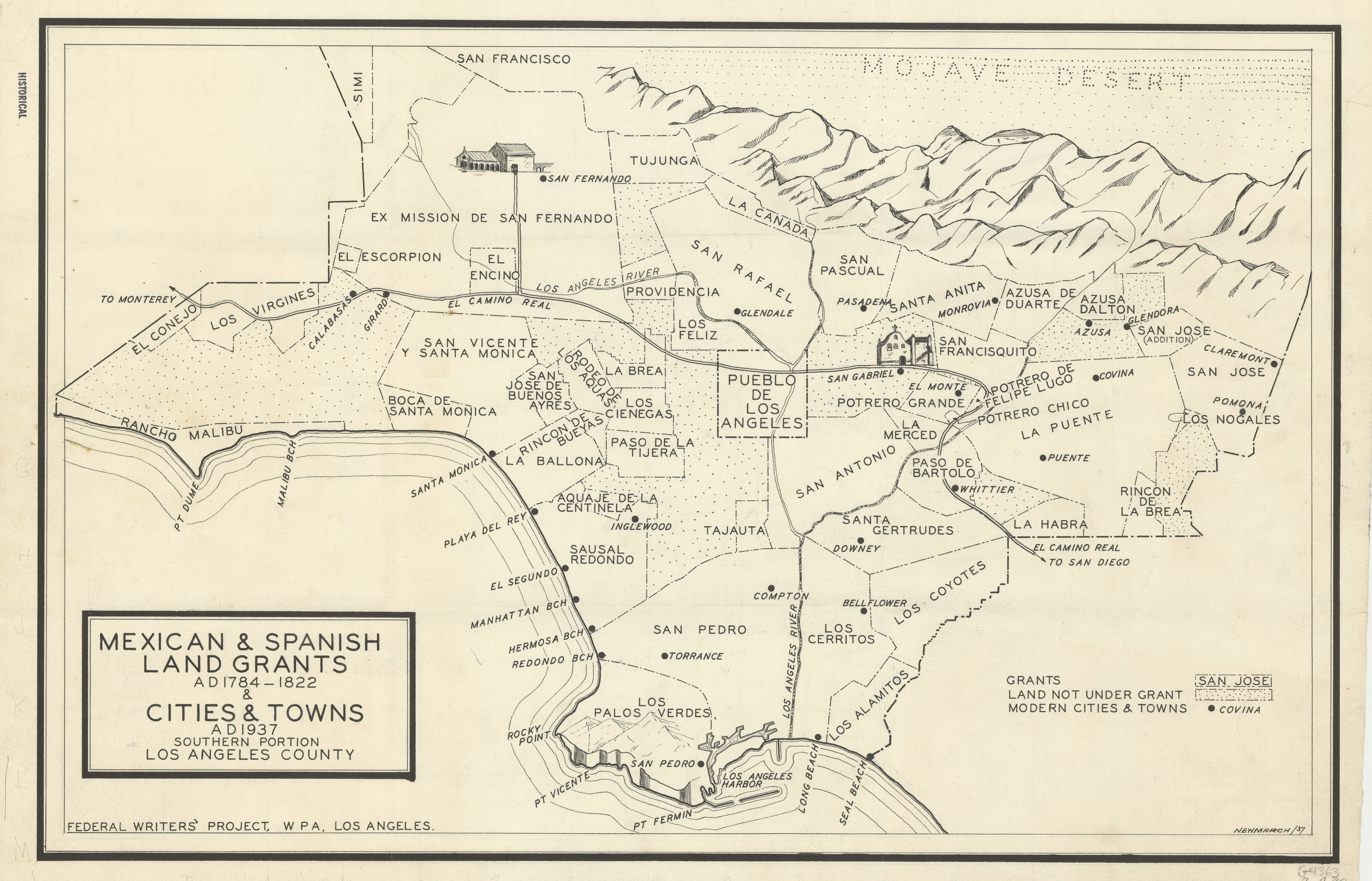
Map of ranchos in Los Angeles County (WPA Federal Writers' Project)

The lack of oversight and clear governance proved ominous for the prosperity of the Mission San Gabriel Arcángel, which presided over present-day Glendora. Controlling approximately 1.5 million acres of some of the richest land with the best water supplies in the region, it was one of the wealthiest of the California missions. Between 1829 and 1833, due to inadequate supervision, corruption among local authorities, and widespread cattle rustling, the Mission's livestock declined dramatically from roughly 13,000 head of cattle to fewer than 75. Soldiers, ranchers, and settlers took advantage of the weakening authority of the Franciscan priests, who had few means to protect Mission resources without effective military support from the Mexican troops, many of whom participated in or overlooked the theft.

In August 1833, this deteriorating situation culminated in the Decree for the Secularization of the Missions of California. Motivated by concerns that the missions, still operated by Spanish-born Franciscan clergy presumably loyal to Spain and the Catholic Church, could perpetuate Spanish influence and undermine independence, the Mexican government transferred control of Church land holdings to the territorial government in Monterey. The decree officially intended to emancipate Indigenous peoples from conditions resembling slavery and redistribute mission lands to them. However, in practice, very few Indigenous Californians received any land anywhere in the Alta California territory. The Mexican government allowed the padres to keep only the church, priests' quarters, and priests' garden. The army troops guarding the Mission were dismissed.

With the Franciscans' oversight removed, Mission San Gabriel's remaining herds of cattle rapidly disappeared, taken by local rancheros, settlers, soldiers, and even former mission administrators. The few remaining priests were powerless to stop them as they now lacked both the authority and manpower to enforce control. This chaotic transition facilitated the ambitions of influential settlers, soldiers, and rancheros with connections to the Mexican authorities in Monterey, resulting in large ranchos owned by a few powerful families.

In 1837, Governor Juan Bautista Alvarado granted the Rancho San José (approximately 22,000 acres) to Ygnacio Palomares and Ricardo Vejar, encompassing southern portions of present-day Glendora as well as areas now known as Pomona and San Dimas. In 1841, another tract including the western parts of present-day Glendora, Rancho El Susa, was granted to Luis Arenas. In 1844, English immigrant Henry Dalton purchased Rancho El Susa from Arenas and acquired a one-third stake in Rancho San José. Dalton renamed his property Rancho Azusa de Dalton, establishing vineyards, orchards, and livestock herds. Central and northern Glendora remained public land for open range cattle grazing.

By the end of the Mexican period in 1848, the Tongva population in the entire Los Angeles Basin, including the San Gabriel Valley, had further declined to approximately 800 individuals, reflecting continued displacement, harsh labor conditions on ranchos, epidemics, and marginalization under Mexican governance.

=== End of the Rancho era and land disputes (1848–1870) ===
The conclusion of the Mexican–American War in 1848 and the cession of California to the United States brought severe challenges for ranchero landowners, including the Californio families in the Glendora area. The 1848 Treaty of Guadalupe Hidalgo pledged that Mexican-era land grants would be respected, but a significant challenge soon arose because Spanish and Mexican authorities in California had used informal systems to define land boundaries, relying on personal relationships and natural landmarks such as hills, streams, and trees. Formal cadastral surveying techniques were viewed as unnecessary in the sparsely populated region. When California became part of the United States, American authorities required precise land surveys and uniform taxation, creating substantial legal and financial burdens for Californio rancheros, who were accustomed to the earlier informal methods. Many rancheros, including local landowner Henry Dalton, faced protracted legal disputes as they struggled to prove ownership of lands previously informally documented.

The federal Land Act of 1851 required all holders of Spanish or Mexican land grants to file claims and prove their titles before a special Public Land Commission and U.S. courts, or else forfeit their lands. This process proved lengthy and costly, often lasting over a decade and involving significant expenses for attorneys, translators, and surveyors. Moreover, California's new state government imposed property taxes on large landholdings, a sharp departure from Mexican rule, which had not taxed land ownership. Many Californio rancheros, being land-rich but cash-poor, struggled to pay these taxes and mounting legal fees, leading them to mortgage, sell, or cede large portions of their ranchos.

By the 1840s, British-born ranchero Henry Dalton owned a 4,431-acre land grant encompassing parts of present-day Azusa, Glendora, and surrounding communities, and had also purchased adjacent ranchos including San Francisquito and Rancho Santa Anita, creating a vast land holding stretching from San Dimas to the eastern boundary of present-day Pasadena. After U.S. annexation, Dalton filed his land claim with the Land Commission in 1852 and eventually received a federal patent in 1876. Despite this legal victory, the cost was significant. Dalton disputed an 1860 federal survey that substantially reduced the size of his rancho, opening it to homesteaders. Dalton's efforts to challenge this survey involved decades of costly litigation and required loans from creditors such as Los Angeles banker Jonathan S. Slauson. Ultimately, Dalton was forced to relinquish nearly all his land to settle debts, retaining only a 55-acre homestead near the modern boundary between Azusa and Glendora. Dalton died nearly penniless in 1884, exemplifying the challenges Californio rancheros faced as legal disputes and financial burdens reshaped land ownership across Southern California.

=== Founding and modern development (1887–present) ===
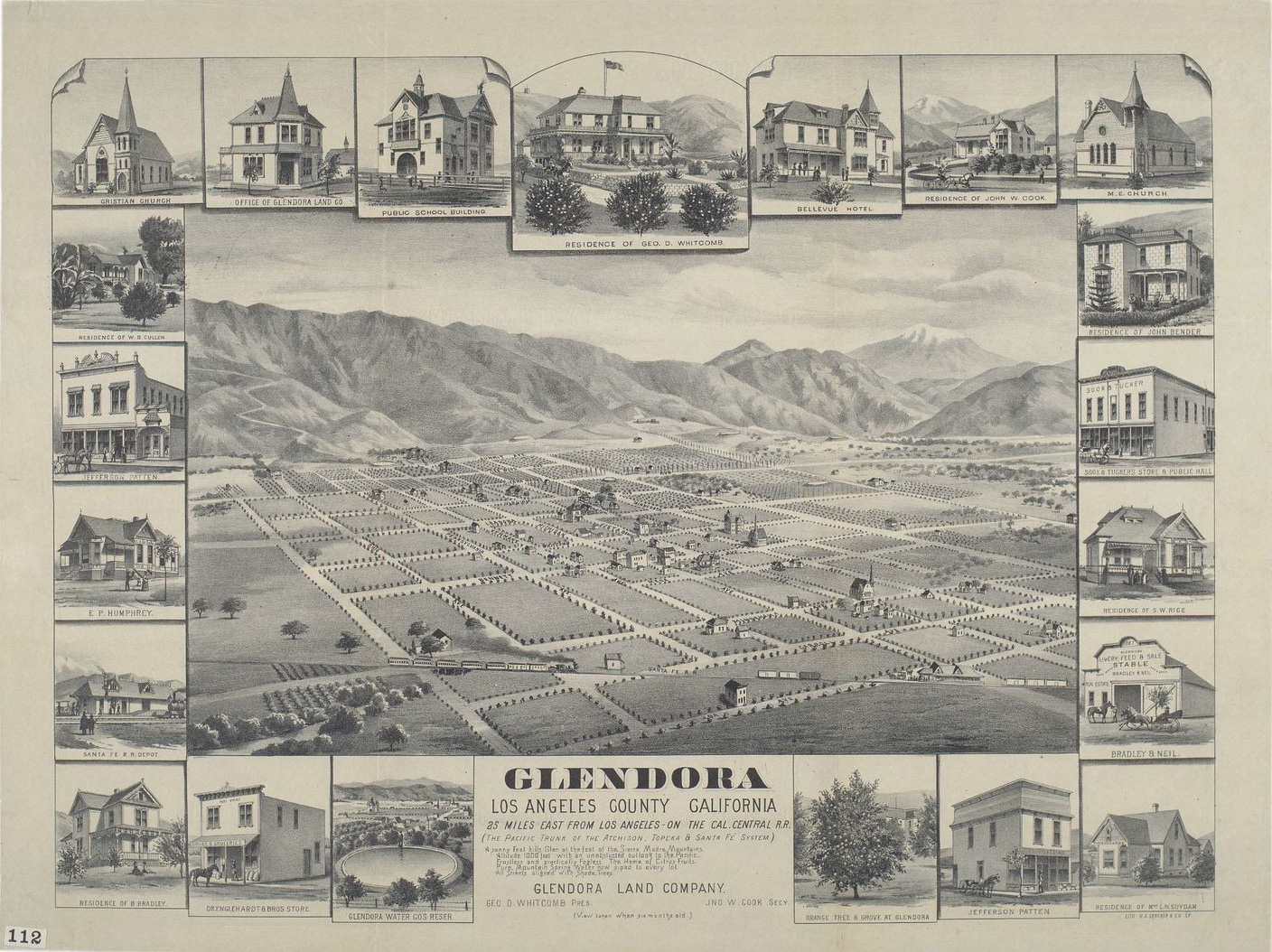
Glendora, Los Angeles County, California 1888 Lithograph

Like many cities in the San Gabriel Valley, Glendora was established on previously remote agricultural land during the Southern California real estate boom of the 1880s. Real estate values in the area rose especially quickly in anticipation of the completion of the Los Angeles and San Gabriel Valley Railroad in May 1887 which connected the area to Los Angeles and the national rail network. In the late 1880s, fierce competition between Santa Fe and rival railroads like Southern Pacific triggered a dramatic reduction in passenger fares, causing ticket prices from major hubs such as St. Louis to Los Angeles to plummet from more than $100 to under $10. This unprecedented affordability attracted tens of thousands of migrants and settlers to Southern California, significantly accelerating the region's development and growth.

The modern-day city of Glendora began with three separate settlements:

- Glendora, north of Ada Avenue and the Glendora train station
- Alosta, south of Ada Avenue and the train station, and north of the South Hills
- Charter Oak, south of the South Hills, parts of which are still unincorporated or annexed into neighboring cities.

Located at the foot of the San Gabriel Mountains, Glendora was started on 200 acres (81 ha) of an 400 acres (160 ha) property George Dexter Whitcomb purchased in 1885 plus and an additional 100 acres (40 ha) acquired by Merick Reynolds, John W. Cook, and Whitcomb’s two sons, Carrol S. and William C. Whitcomb, under the name the “Glendora Land Company.” On the first day of sale, April 1, 1887, 300 lots were sold. Later that month, the Suydam family built the first building erected after Glendora officially became a town – a barn at 645 N Vista Bonita Avenue, which served as their home until their house was completed in October.

George D. Whitcomb, the founder of the Whitcomb Locomotive Works in Chicago and Rochelle, Illinois, had moved to the San Gabriel Valley in the early 1880s for health reasons and to enjoy the climate and landscape of the area. He devised the name Glendora by combining the name of his wife, Leadora Bennett Whitcomb (1839–1929), with the location of his new development in a glen between the San Gabriel Mountains and the South Hills. George Whitcomb used his connections in the railroad industry to have the planned course of the San Gabriel Valley railroad re-routed from south of the South Hills serving Charter Oak to a new location north of the South Hills to improve the prospects of his new development. In December 1907, the growth of Glendora experienced a significant boost with the arrival of the Pacific Electric. The company introduced passenger service via an extension of the Pacific Electric Railway's Monrovia–Glendora Line, offering hourly, direct connections from downtown Glendora to the Pacific Electric Building at Sixth and Main in Downtown Los Angeles. At least as importantly, Pacific Electric also delivered commercial electricity to Glendora for the first time, dramatically transforming daily life in the community. Pacific Electric rail lines seldom turned a profit directly from passenger fares; instead, the company's business model primarily relied on generating revenue by supplying electricity to the rapidly growing towns along its routes, which flourished thanks to the essential transportation infrastructure provided by the railway before the widespread adoption of automobiles. Prior to its 1911 incorporation, Glendora's administrator officially occupied the office of President of Glendora.

Glendora experienced significant growth during Southern California's citrus boom in the early 20th century, becoming a thriving hub for citrus production. At its peak in 1947, the local citrus industry encompassed over 5,000 acres of orange and lemon orchards, supported by six packing houses processing approximately 78,000 tons of fruit annually, valued between $4 million and $8 million (roughly $60–120 million in 2025 dollars).

The downtown area as it appears now is the product of years of renovation and maintenance by the city. The former opera house, movie theatre, Pacific Electric station, banks, hotels, grocery and department stores were converted for modern uses. The original layout can be read about on the Downtown Glendora Historical Walk, by reading placards placed along Glendora Avenue (previously called Michigan Avenue). The original townsite was bounded by Sierra Madre Avenue on the north, Minnesota Avenue on the east, Ada Avenue and the railroad on the south, and Pennsylvania Avenue on the west.

Glendora used to be home to several military academies, which have since been converted into either churches or private school facilities. These academies included Brown Military Academy, now St. Lucy's Priory High School and Church of the Open Door on Sierra Madre, and Harding Military Academy, whose property is now home to North Glendora Private, a prestigious private community adjacent to Easley Canyon atop Glendora Avenue.

From 1960 to 1978, Glendora was home to Clokey Productions which produced 85 episodes of Gumby and 65 episodes of Davey and Goliath in a studio on Fleetwood Place near Grand Avenue and Arrow Highway. In celebration of this history, Glendora hosted a Gumby Fest in 2014 which brought thousands of people from around the country and Canada. In 2015 a second GumbyFest was held at Citrus College over an entire weekend. In 2024, the city of Glendora launched new branding including a new city logo in a "'Gumby' shade of green."

Several wildfires have affected the city in recent years, the most notable being the campfire triggered Colby Fire, which displaced hundreds of Glendora residents. A relief concert titled "Glendora Band Aid" was held shortly after the fire to help raise funds to assist the homeowners who lost their homes in the fire.

Glendora has an active Chamber of Commerce, established in 1903. The mission of the Glendora Chamber is to provide tools and resources to assist the business community in prospering and adapting to the economic climate, while growing membership and promoting local purchasing.

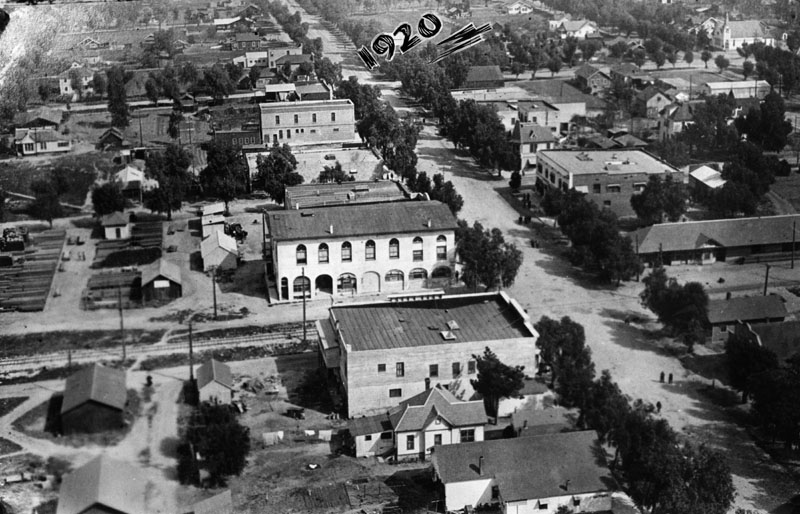
Glendora, 1920.

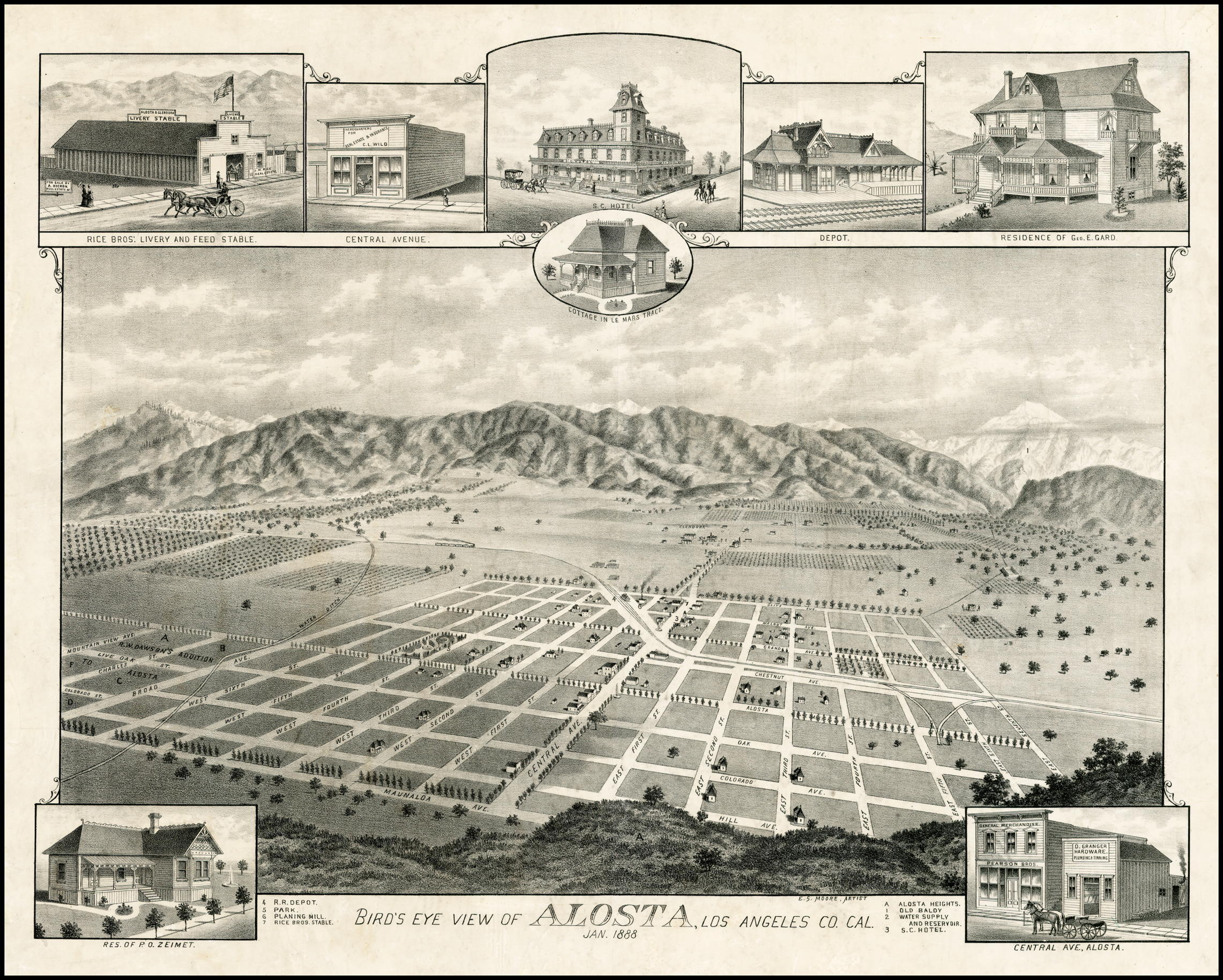
Early Alosta-Glendora Map 1888. View looking north from present-day South Hills Park Wilderness Area

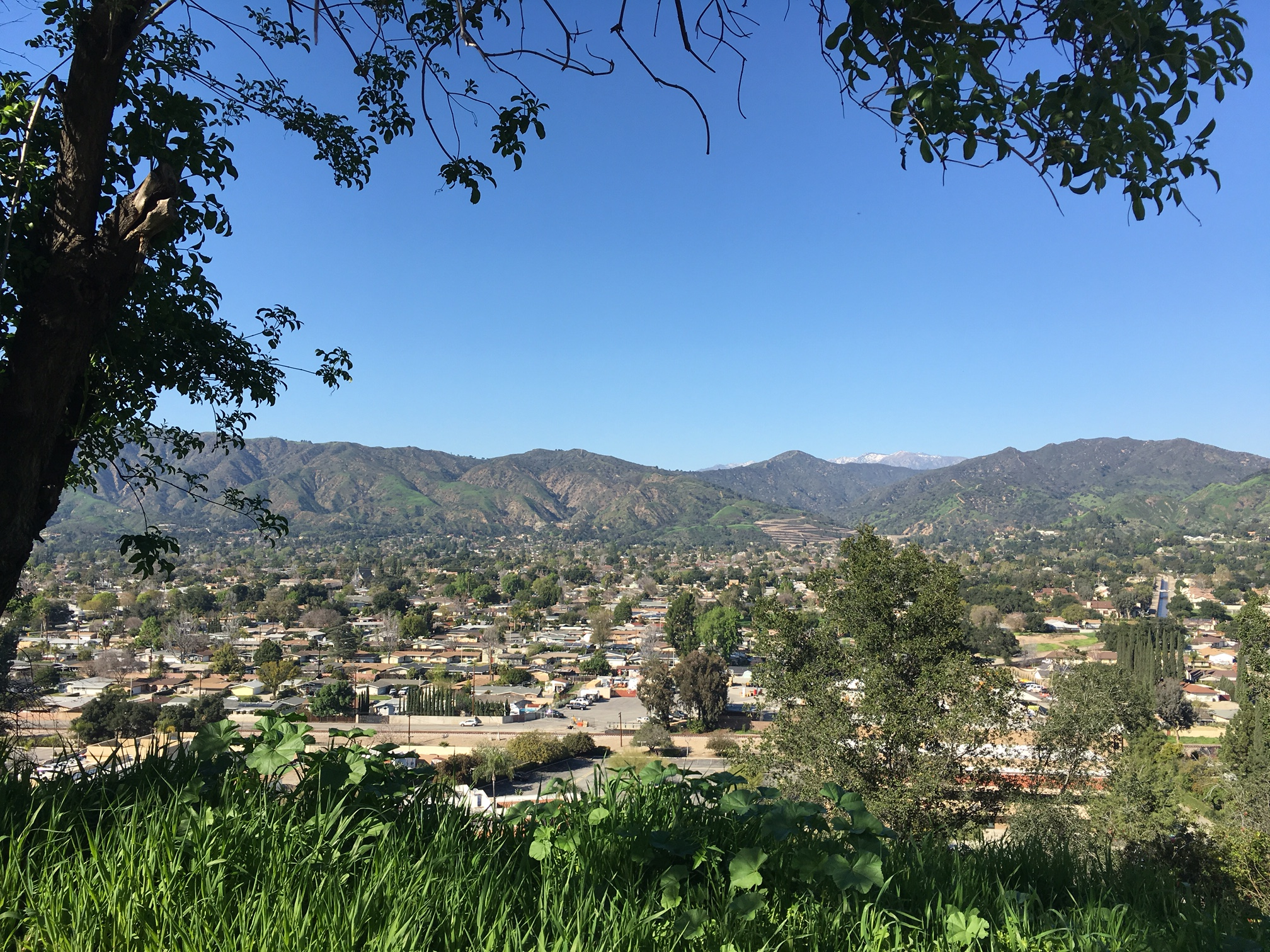
(2017) view from the South Hills

== Geography ==
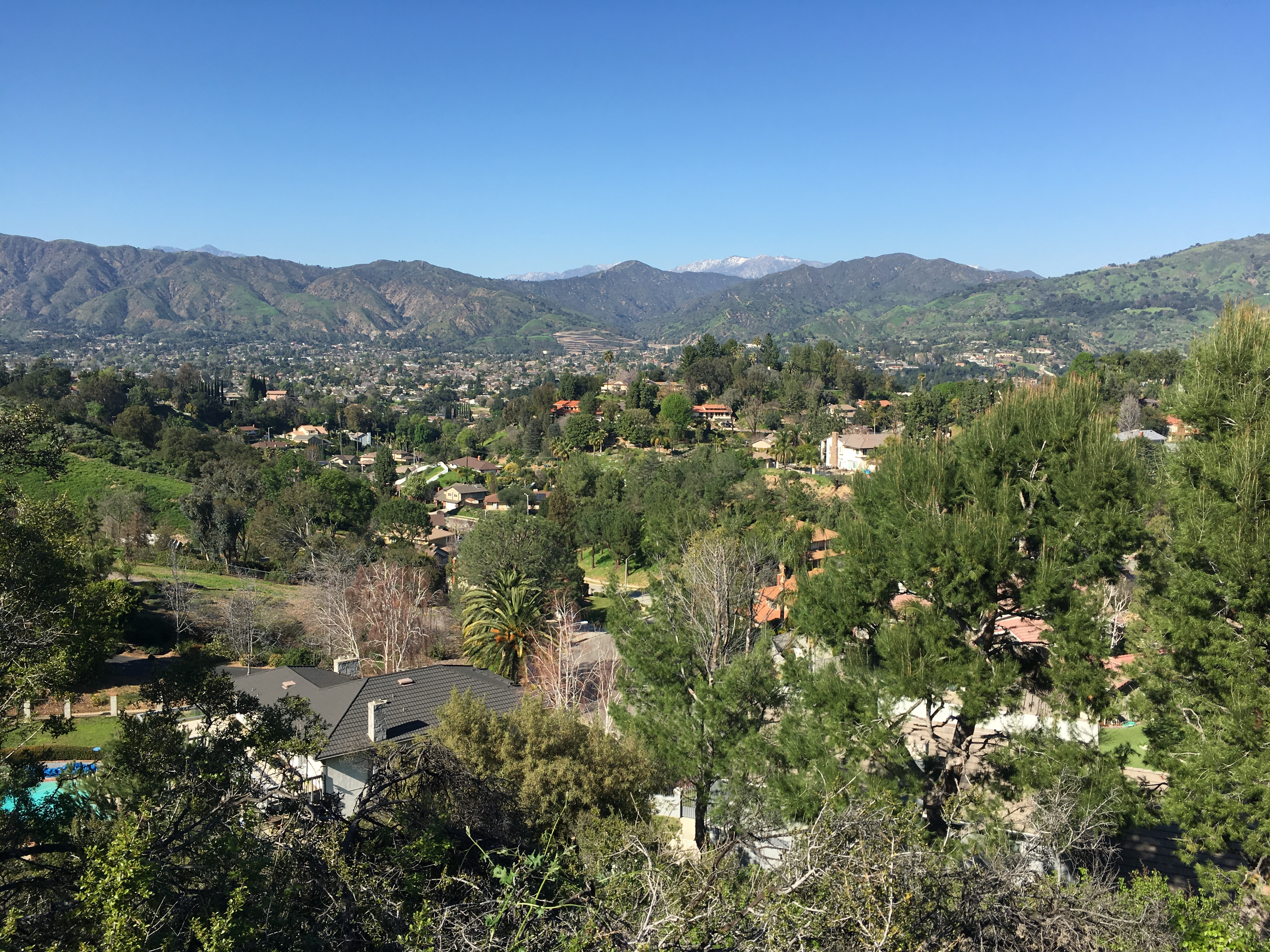
Glendora with the San Gabriel Mountains in the background

The city lies in the eastern end of the San Gabriel Valley between the San Gabriel Mountains range to the north and the South Hills to the south of most of the city.

According to the United States Census Bureau, the city has a total area of 19.6 square miles (51 km^{2}), of which 19.4 square miles (50 km^{2}) is land and 0.2 square miles (0.52 km^{2}), or 0.84%, is water.

=== Geology ===
Approximately 15–17 million years ago, during the Miocene, lava erupted in the area that is now Glendora. Lava flows and volcanic debris hardened into rock that geologists call the "Glendora Volcanics," a stratigraphic unit first described in the foothills near the city. No volcanic cone remains. Today, these volcanic rocks are mapped by the U.S. Geological Survey and form much of the base of the South Hills.

=== Climate ===
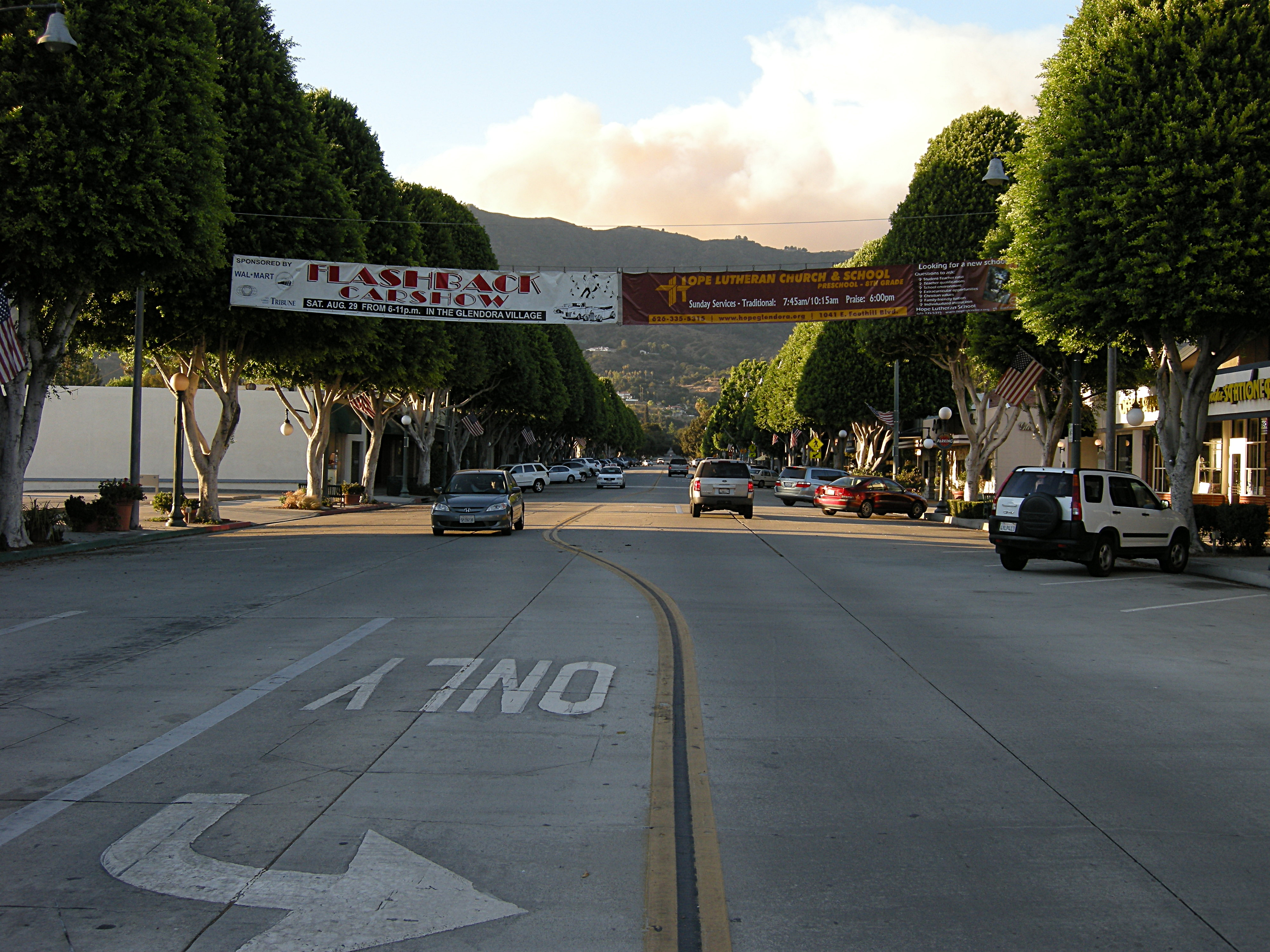
Glendora Village in 2009 with Morris Fire smoke plume

Glendora has a dry Mediterranean climate (Köppen Csa) characterized by hotter summers and slightly cooler winters than coastal areas of California. The dry weather lasts for most of the year except for the rainy season in the winter. Hot summer temperatures and warm Santa Ana winds in the fall increase the risk of wildfires in the surrounding mountains. Between 1896 and 1991, eight fires burned more than 120 acres. The 2009 Morris Fire, 2014 Colby Fire, and the 2015 Cabin Fire are some of the most recent wildfires affecting Glendora and nearby cities.

Climate data for Glendora, California (1981–2010 normals)
Month	Jan	Feb	Mar	Apr	May	Jun	Jul	Aug	Sep	Oct	Nov	Dec	Year
Mean daily maximum °F (°C)	68 (20)	69 (21)	71 (22)	76 (24)	79 (26)	84 (29)	90 (32)	92 (33)	89 (32)	80 (27)	74 (23)	68 (20)	78 (26)
Mean daily minimum °F (°C)	43 (6)	45 (7)	47 (8)	49 (9)	54 (12)	58 (14)	62 (17)	62 (17)	60 (16)	55 (13)	47 (8)	42 (6)	52 (11)
Average precipitation inches (mm)	3.78 (96)	4.76 (121)	2.66 (68)	1.20 (30)	.33 (8.4)	.09 (2.3)	.01 (0.25)	.03 (0.76)	.18 (4.6)	1.05 (27)	1.62 (41)	2.45 (62)	18.16 (461)

=== Ecology ===
A survey conducted between 1967 and 1992 found four plant communities in the Glendora Foothills: dense, woody, evergreen chaparral; open coastal sage scrub with annuals growing between aromatic shrubs and sub-shrubs; fairly open oak woodland with trees 20–60 feet tall; and freshwater marsh with water-loving plants. Chaparral is most common on north-facing slopes. Coastal sage scrub is favored where rainfall is below what is preferred by chaparral, where humans repeatedly disturb the soil, or where the soil is sandy or gravelly. Freshwater marsh is found in the Big Dalton Debris Basin, which has water year-round but provides a less stable environment than naturally wet areas.

== Demographics ==
Historical population
Census	Pop.	Note	%±
1920	2,028		—
1930	2,761		36.1%
1940	2,822		2.2%
1950	3,988		41.3%
1960	20,752		420.4%
1970	31,380		51.2%
1980	38,500		22.7%
1990	47,828		24.2%
2000	49,415		3.3%
2010	50,073		1.3%
2020	52,558		5.0%
U.S. Decennial Census; 1860–1870 1880–1890; 1900 1910 1920; 1930 1940 1950; 1960 1970 1980; 1990 2000 2010; 2020

Glendora first appeared as a city in the 1920 U.S. census as part of Azusa Township (pop 4,154 in 1910).

=== Racial and ethnic composition ===
Glendora city, California – Racial and ethnic composition Note: the US Census treats Hispanic/Latino as an ethnic category. This table excludes Latinos from the racial categories and assigns them to a separate category. Hispanics/Latinos may be of any race.
Race / Ethnicity (NH = Non-Hispanic)	Pop 1980	Pop 1990	Pop 2000	Pop 2010	Pop 2020	% 1980	% 1990	% 2000	% 2010	% 2020
White alone (NH)	33,858	37,260	33,564	28,565	23,384	87.59%	77.90%	67.92%	57.05%	44.49%
Black or African American alone (NH)	215	498	704	834	1,021	0.56%	1.04%	1.42%	1.67%	1.94%
Native American or Alaska Native alone (NH)	164	194	158	102	120	0.42%	0.41%	0.32%	0.20%	0.23%
Asian alone (NH)	838	2,584	3,003	3,898	6,656	2.17%	5.40%	6.08%	7.78%	12.66%
Native Hawaiian or Pacific Islander alone (NH)	838	2,584	26	42	24	2.17%	5.40%	0.05%	0.08%	0.05%
Other race alone (NH)	96	42	88	106	274	0.25%	0.09%	0.18%	0.21%	0.52%
Mixed race or Multiracial (NH)	x	x	1,132	1,178	2,062	x	x	2.29%	2.35%	3.92%
Hispanic or Latino (any race)	3,483	7,250	10,740	15,348	19,017	9.01%	15.16%	21.73%	30.65%	36.18%
Total	38,654	47,828	49,415	50,073	52,558	100.00%	100.00%	100.00%	100.00%	100.00%

=== 2020 census ===
As of the 2020 census, Glendora had a population of 52,558. The median age was 42.1 years. 20.3% of residents were under the age of 18 and 18.1% of residents were 65 years of age or older. For every 100 females there were 94.4 males, and for every 100 females age 18 and over there were 92.1 males age 18 and over.

98.6% of residents lived in urban areas, while 1.4% lived in rural areas.

There were 18,196 households in Glendora, of which 33.7% had children under the age of 18 living in them. Of all households, 56.1% were married-couple households, 14.3% were households with a male householder and no spouse or partner present, and 24.6% were households with a female householder and no spouse or partner present. About 19.2% of all households were made up of individuals and 9.7% had someone living alone who was 65 years of age or older.

There were 18,637 housing units, of which 2.4% were vacant. The homeowner vacancy rate was 0.5% and the rental vacancy rate was 2.8%.

=== 2010 census ===
As of the census of 2010, there were 50,073 people, 16,819 households, and 12,866 families residing in the city. The population density was 2,581.5 inhabitants per square mile (996.7/km^{2}). There were 17,145 housing units at an average density of 895.7 per square mile (345.8/km^{2}). The racial makeup of the city was 75.1% White (57.0% Non-Hispanic White), 1.9% Black or African American, 0.7% Native American, 8.0% Asian, 0.1% Pacific Islander, 5.2% from other races, and 4.8% from two or more races. 30.7% of the population were Hispanic or Latino of any race.

According to the 2010 United States Census, Glendora had a median household income of $74,615, with 7.8% of the population living below the federal poverty line.

Mexican (16.3%) and German (11.3%) were the most common ancestries in Glendora. Mexico (22.1%) and the Philippines (9.0%) were the most common foreign places of birth in Glendora.

=== 2000 census ===
As of the census of 2000, there were 49,415 people, 16,819 households, and 12,866 families residing in the city. The population density was 996.8/km^{2} (2,581.5/mi^{2}). There were 17,145 housing units at an average density of 345.9/km^{2} (895.7/mi^{2}). The racial makeup of the city was 80.3% White, 1.50% Black or African American, 0.6% Native American, 16.2% Asian, 0.1% Pacific Islander, 7.2% from other races, and 4.0% from two or more races. 11.7% of the population were Hispanic or Latino of any race.

There were 16,819 households out of which 38.6% had children under the age of 18 living with them, 60.1% were married couples living together, 12.1% had a female householder with no husband present, and 23.5% were non-families. 19.1% of all households were made up of individuals and 7.9% had someone living alone who was 65 years of age or older. The average household size was 2.88 and the average family size was 3.30.

The age distribution of the city was as follows: 27.6% under the age of 18, 7.6% from 18 to 24 years old, 29.1% from 25 to 44, 23.2% from 45 to 64, and 12.5% who were 65 years of age or older. The median age was 37 years. For every 100 females there were 93.2 males. For every 100 females age 18 and over, there were 89.6 males.

The median income for a household in the city was $60,013, and the median income for a family was $66,674 (these figures had risen to $72,414 and $86,606 respectively as of a 2007 estimate). Males had a median income of $49,548 versus $35,062 for females. The per capita income for the city was $25,993. 5.9% of the population and 3.9% of families were below the poverty line. Out of the total people living in poverty, 6.7% were under the age of 18 and 5.0% are 65 or older.

== Government ==
=== City government ===
Founded as a community in 1887, Glendora was formally incorporated as a city on Nov. 13, 1911 making it the 25th oldest city in Los Angeles County out of a total of 88. It is a general-law city with a council–manager government, meaning the administrative head of the city is a City Manager who is appointed and overseen by a city council of five members. The current City Manager is Adam Raymond.

As of 2020, the members are elected by district and serve four-year (staggered) terms of office. Following each election, the council selects from its membership a mayor and mayor pro tem. The current Mayor is David Fredendall.

In order to avoid the kinds of costly lawsuits other cities had faced under the California Voting Rights Act of 2001, the City of Glendora reluctantly changed how council members are elected by transitioning from an at-large election system to a district-based election system. This included switching the election cycle from odd years to even years. The first phase began in March 2020, when representatives from Council Districts 2, 3 and 5 were elected. The second phase took place in 2022 when representatives from Districts 1 and 4 were on the ballot.

Public safety services are provided by the Glendora Police Department and the Los Angeles County Fire Department.

=== State and federal government ===
In the California State Legislature, Glendora is in the 25th senatorial district, represented by Democrat Sasha Renée Pérez, and in the 48th Assembly district, represented by Democrat Blanca Rubio.

In the United States House of Representatives, Glendora is split between California's 28th congressional district, represented by Democrat Judy Chu and California's 31st congressional district, represented by Democrat Gil Cisneros.

== Education ==
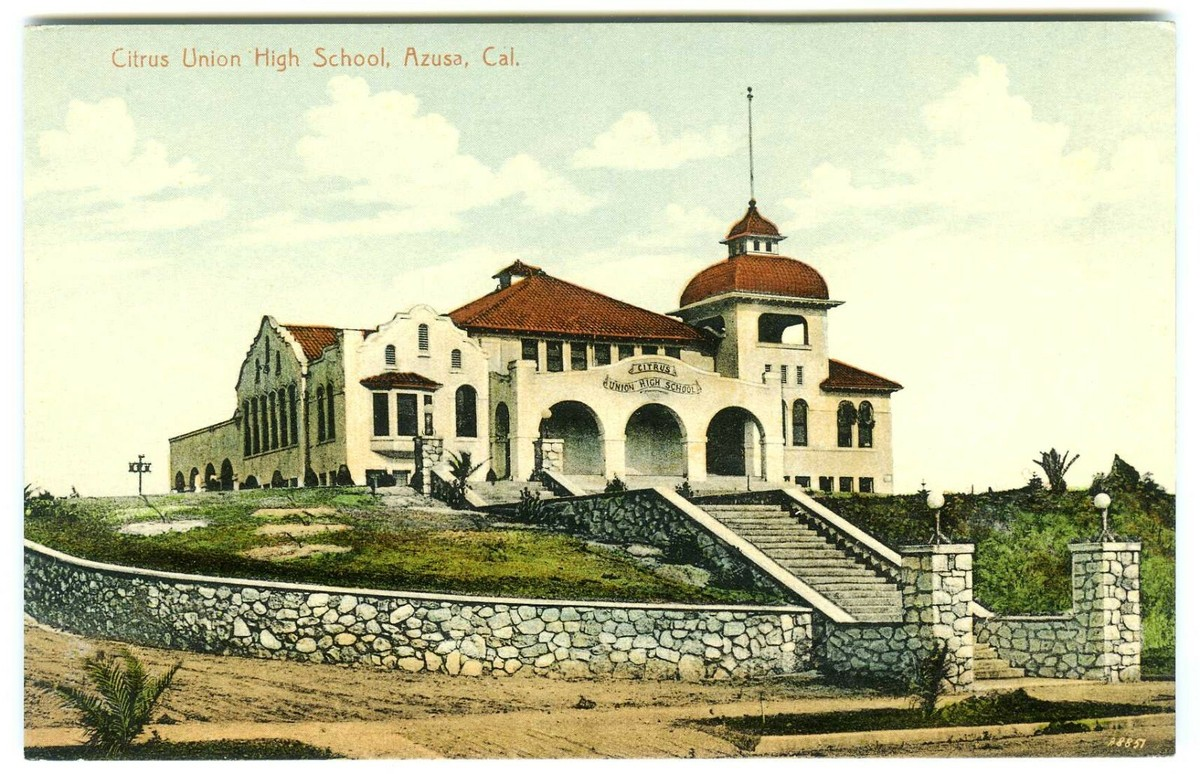
Pre-WWI postcard of Citrus Union High School in present-day Glendora, California

The city of Glendora is served by two public school districts: Glendora Unified, covering neighborhoods north of the South Hills, and Charter Oak Unified (COUSD), serving areas south of the South Hills. This division reflects Glendora's historical development, having evolved from three previously distinct communities. Initially, Glendora and the community of Alosta (formally absorbed into Glendora by its incorporation in 1911) were part of Citrus Union High School District, which operated from 1891 to 1961 and also served Azusa and Covina. It was the first union high school district in California, meaning different communities with separate elementary schools shared a common high school. Citrus Union High School was founded on July 4, 1891, and its first graduation included 4 students. This school became Citrus College 24-years later and also hosted a shared high school campus. In 1961, Glendora separated from Citrus Union to establish its own school district and High School. The Charter Oak community established its own independent school district in 1894, which continues to operate today.

Both of these school districts are considered two of the best in the state and the country, consistently ranking in the top performing brackets. Both districts have schools designated as California Distinguished Schools and Gold Ribbon Schools.

=== Elementary schools ===
- Cullen Elementary School
- La Fetra Elementary School
- Sellers Elementary School
- Stanton Elementary School
- Sutherland Elementary School
- Washington Elementary School (COUSD)
- Willow Elementary School (COUSD)

=== Middle schools ===
- Goddard Middle School
- Sandburg Middle School

=== High schools ===
- Glendora High School

=== Continuation high schools ===
- Arrow Continuation High School (COUSD)
- Whitcomb Continuation High School

=== Private schools ===
- Hope Lutheran Church and School – Preschool through 8th-grade boys and girls school
- Foothill Christian School – Preschool through 8th-grade boys and girls school
- St. Lucy's Priory High School – All girls college-prep high school
- St. Dorothy School – Kindergarten through 8th grade boys and girls school

=== Universities and colleges ===
- Citrus College

== Public health ==
There are two hospitals in the city:

- Foothill Presbyterian Hospital
- Glendora Community Hospital

Los Angeles County also offers community health services for Glendora residents at the Monrovia Health Center and Pomona Health Center.

== Culture and recreation ==
=== Cultural facilities ===
- Haugh Performing Arts Center
- Glendora Historical Society Museum
- Rubel Castle
- Glendora Public Library
- Glendora Public Market

=== Parks and trails ===
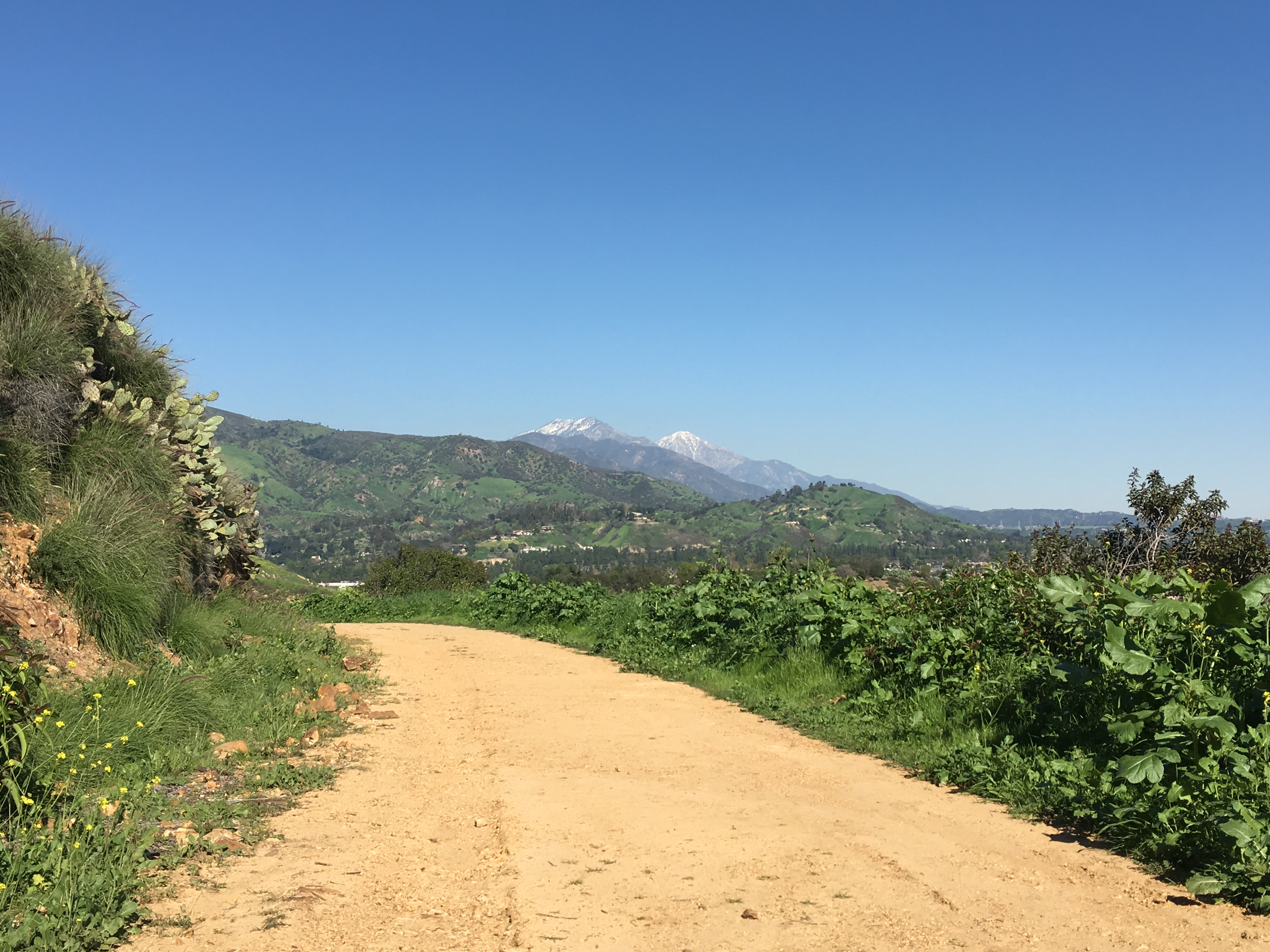
South Hills Wilderness Trail with Mt Baldy and Cucamonga Peak in the distance

Glendora is an active community and it has an extensive system of parks, trails, and recreational programs for the community.

- Big Dalton Canyon Wilderness Park and Campground
- Centennial Heritage Park – The site was constructed to depict a late 19th-century to early 20th-century citrus ranch and features the Hamilton House, a working print shop, and numerous antique farm implements. Also on site is the Orton Englehart workshop, dedicated to its namesake, native Glendoran and inventor of the horizontal action impact sprinkler. This sprinkler became known as the Rain Bird, revolutionized the irrigation industry, and was recognized as a historic landmark of agricultural engineering in 1990 by the American Society of Agricultural and Biological Engineers.
- Finkbiner Park
- Big Tree Park – Small park with a 140-year-old Moreton Bay fig tree listed as of 2013 by CalPoly as the largest of its kind in the United States.

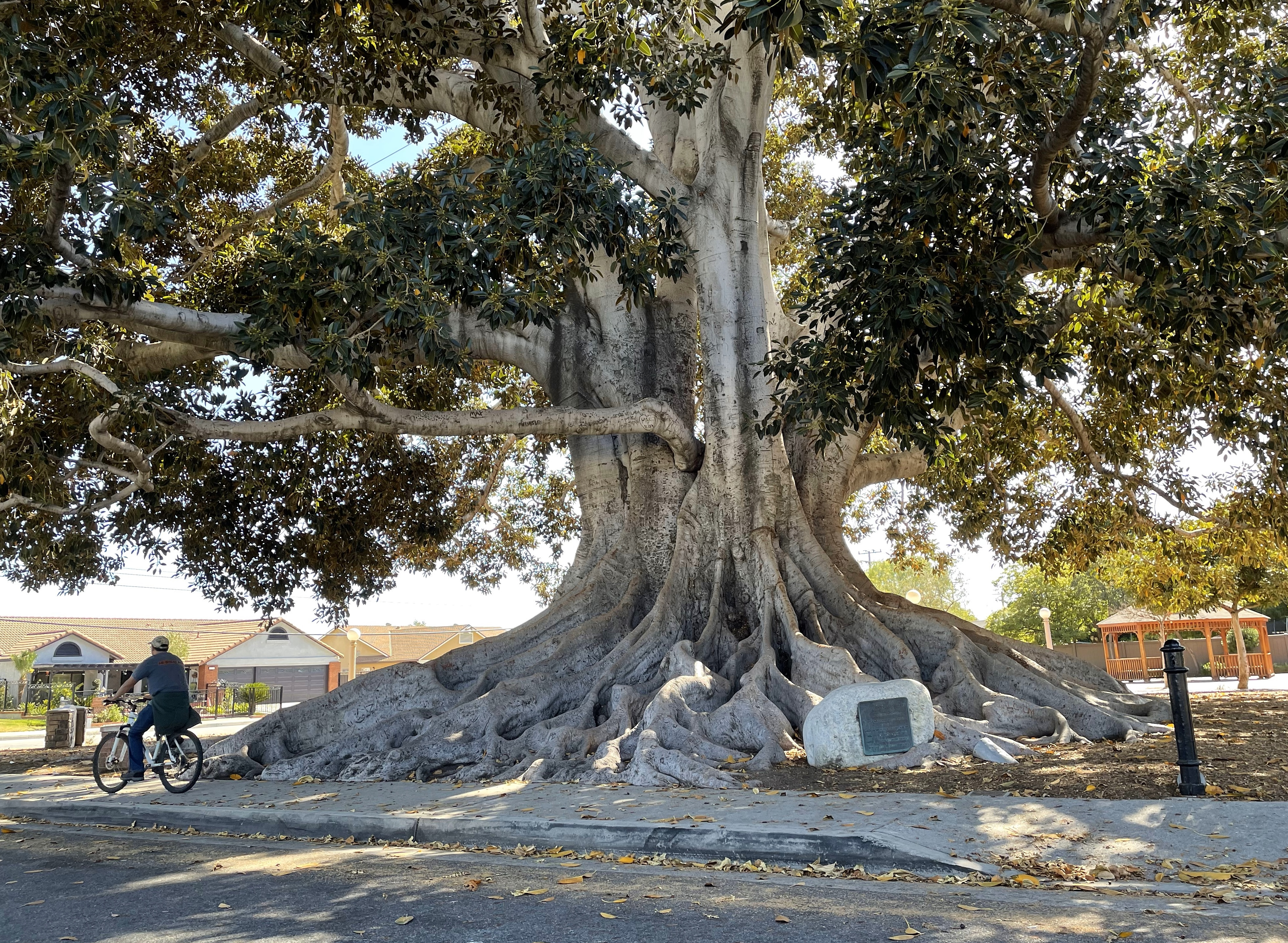
Big Tree Park

- Louie Pompei Memorial Sports Park
- Glendora Urban Trail System
- South Hills – Park and wilderness trail
- Colby Trail
- Lower Monroe Truck Trail – Hiking and mountain biking trail.
- Punk Out Trail
- Mystic Canyon Trail
- Glendora bougainvillea – Largest growth of Bougainvillea in the United States.
- Glen Oaks Golf and Learning Center – Offers a driving range, instructional services, practice area, and the 9-hole Par 3 course itself.
- Camp Cahuilla Summer Camp ("Dirt Camp") – One of the most popular of the Parks and Recreation programs offering activities to more than 500 children every summer.
- San Gabriel Mountains National Monument - The headquarters of the San Gabriel Mountains National Monument is located in a WPA building on N. Wabash Avenue. Several trails provide access directly from Glendora into the protected lands of the park. Glendora Mountain Road is a very popular destination in and into the National Monument for Mountain Bikers from across the region.

The Glendora Mountain Road and Glendora Ridge Road are also common routes for cyclists and sightseers with views through the San Gabriel Mountains. These roads have also hosted stages of the international Tour of California.

== Transportation ==
=== Public transit ===
Los Angeles Metro's A Line serves Glendora at the Glendora station, which opened on September 19, 2025, as part of the Foothill extension from its previous terminus in Azusa to the City of Pomona. It provides a "one-seat ride" (no transfers) to Pasadena, Los Angeles Union Station, the Financial District of Los Angeles, and downtown Long Beach. Additionally, Foothill Transit provides connections through the city and express service to downtown Los Angeles.

Glendora also runs its own weekday transportation shuttle service, the Glendora Mini Bus, with shuttles serving the A Line rail station, and an inter-school service connecting some of the city's schools. The city's Dial-A-Ride service provides curb-to-curb transportation services for senior and disabled residents of Glendora.

=== Freeways and highways ===
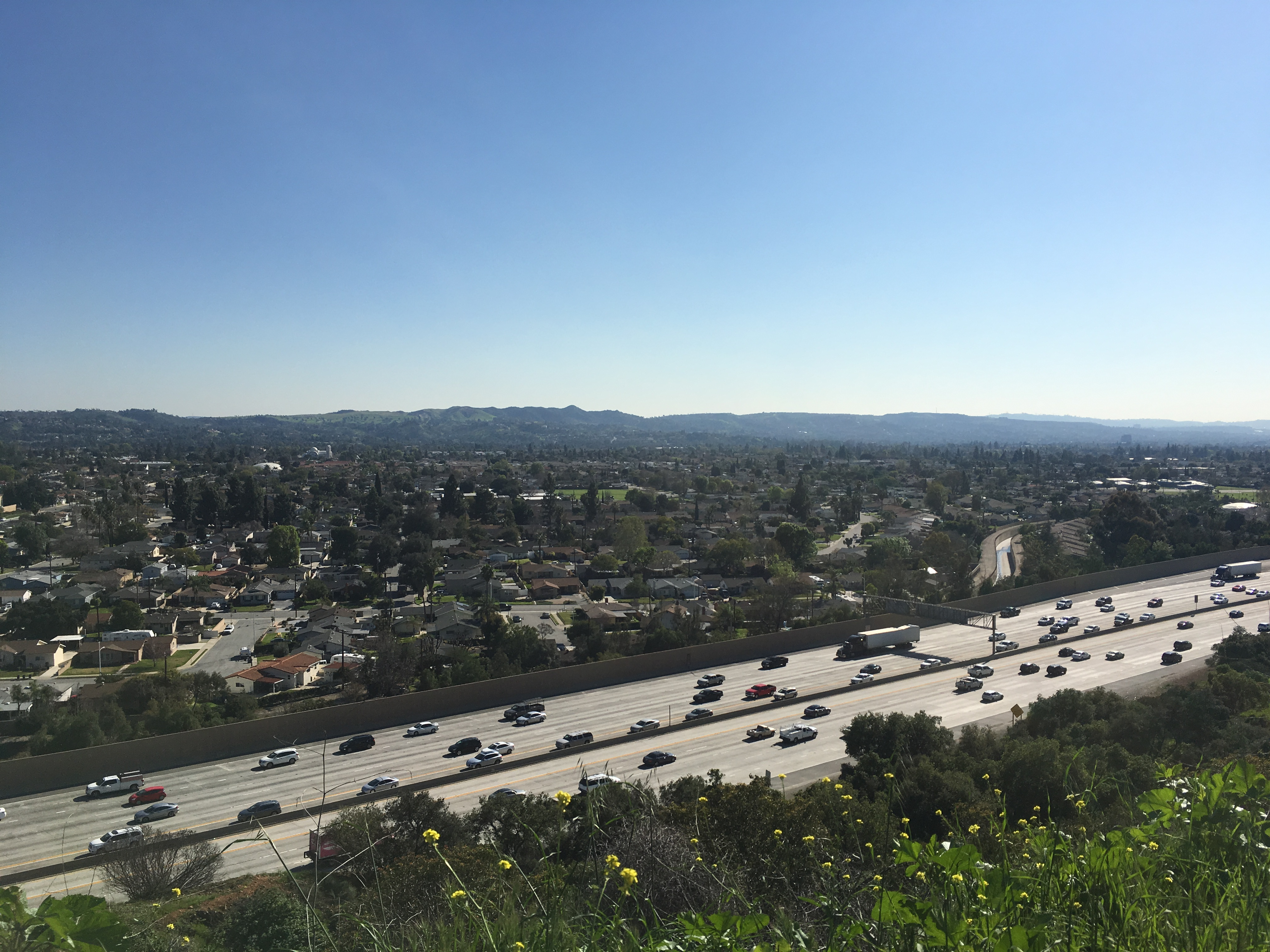
210 Freeway through Glendora

Glendora lies at the intersection of two major freeways, the 210 and the 57, in what was formerly known as the Glendora Curve. These two freeways conveniently connect the city with the rest of the Southern California region. Historic U.S. Route 66 also traverses the city from east to west and it is an important corridor for businesses. Other major roads and highways include Foothill Boulevard, Grand Avenue, Arrow Highway, and Lone Hill Avenue.

=== Airports ===
There are no airports within the city limits. Glendora is within forty-five miles from all major area airports including Los Angeles International Airport (LAX), Hollywood Burbank Airport (BUR), Ontario International Airport (ONT), Long Beach Airport (LGB), and John Wayne Airport (SNA) in Orange County.

== Economy ==
The National Hot Rod Association and Armstrong Garden Centers are based in Glendora.

=== Top employers ===
According to the city's 2018 Comprehensive Annual Financial Report, the top employers in the city are:

Rank	Employer	# of Employees
1	Citrus College	807
2	Glendora Unified School District	798
3	LA County Department of Children and Family Services	600
4	Foothill Presbyterian Hospital	653
5	Glendora Grand	350
6	Ormco Corporation	350
7	Walmart	416
8	Glendora Community Hospital	334
9	City of Glendora	245
10	Sam's Club	196

== Media ==
Glendora is served by media in Los Angeles, the second-largest market in the U.S., including its TV and radio stations.

Glendora falls largely within the Los Angeles Studio Zone, also known as the "Thirty Mile Zone" or "TMZ," an area extending 30 miles outward from the intersection of Beverly and La Cienega Boulevards, near the Beverly Center. First established by film industry labor unions and Hollywood studios in the 1930s, the zone defines shoots within this radius as "local," allowing productions to save significantly by avoiding extra costs for crew transportation, overnight lodging, and per diem allowances that would be required if filming outside this boundary. Notable productions filmed in Glendora include MTV's Faking It, and the film The Circle (2017) starring Tom Hanks and Emma Watson.

=== Television ===
KGLN TV is a public-access channel under the exclusive editorial control of the City of Glendora. By law, programming and information appearing on this channel is limited to City-originated programming of Public Meetings, City-sponsored events/activities, City-originated information, and the California legislative network live cablecast for a portion of each program day.

=== News media ===
San Gabriel Valley Tribune based in Monrovia, provides mainstream news coverage for Glendora and surrounding foothill communities.

Library Happenings is a bi-monthly newsletter published by the Glendora Public Library, providing information about local library programs and events. Online archives of the newsletter date back to 2007.

Glendora City News is a local news outlet established in 2014. It covers city news, local events, public meetings, election information, community calendar events, and public safety updates such as fires and mudslides. It also occasionally provides updates on local employment opportunities and community volunteer initiatives.

== Notable people ==
- Michael Anthony – Van Halen bassist and backing vocalist
- Lea Antonoplis – professional tennis player who won the Wimbledon Girls' Singles in 1977 and four WTA doubles titles
- LaVar Arrington – NFL player
- Steven Barnes – science fiction and mystery author, writer
- Tamra Judge – reality television personality and businesswoman
- Adrian Carrio – race car driver
- Frank Chance – Hall of Fame MLB baseball player and manager, primarily with the Chicago Cubs, renowned as part of the legendary Tinker to Evers to Chance double-play trio He built the Frank Chance Building at the NE corner of Glendora Avenue and Foothill in downtown Glendora in 1912, also known as the "Cub Building" because it housed the Cub Grocery for many years. The building still stands.
- Bryan Clay – Olympic gold medalist 2008, Olympic silver medalist 2004, Decathlon
- Art Clokey – stop-motion clay animation pioneer, creator of Gumby
- Brian Cooper – MLB baseball player
- Collin Delia – NHL hockey player
- Rocky Dennis – subject of the biographical film Mask
- Soleil Moon Frye – Punky Brewster actress
- George E. Gard – one of only three men to have served as both LAPD Chief of Police and Sheriff of Los Angeles County, founder of the town of Alosta (now part of the city of Glendora)
- Jacob Gonzalez – MLB baseball player
- Jajaira Gonzalez – boxer, Olympian
- Hannah Grisham – racing driver
- Howard Hawkes – American film director
- Casey Jacobsen – NBA basketball player
- Tamra Judge – television personality, cast member of The Real Housewives of Orange County
- Ed “Eddie" Kirkpatrick - MLB baseball player
- David Klein – inventor of Jelly Belly candy
- D. Wayne Lukas – racehorse trainer
- Richard and Maurice McDonald - McDonald’s founders who went into the restaurant business after running a movie theater and snack bar at the SW corner of Foothill and Glendora Avenue from 1930 to 1937.
- Gabrial McNair – No Doubt keyboardist
- José Mota – MLB baseball player, radio announcer, sports commentator, son of Manny Mota
- Tracy Murray – NBA basketball player
- Anna Nalick – singer
- Vince Neil – singer for heavy metal band Mötley Crüe
- DJ Peters – MLB baseball player
- Donald H. Pflueger - American historian
- Adam Plutko – MLB baseball player
- Sally Rand – actress and dancer
- Tony Robbins – motivational speaker. Served as Glendora High School student body president 1977-78
- Aaron Rowand – MLB baseball player, 2007 All-Star and two-time World Series champion
- Misty Rowe – actress, voice actor
- Julie Smith – 1996 Olympic softball gold medalist, coach
- Philip Shahbaz – actor, voice of Altaïr Ibn-La'Ahad in the Assassin’s Creed franchise
- Charles Silent - Associate Justice of the Arizona Territorial Supreme Court. Developer of St. James Park (now part of West Adams), once the wealthiest neighborhood in Los Angeles. Played a pivotal role in developing Elysian Park, earning him the title “Father of the Parks Commission.” Silent Ranch is now the location of the St. Lucy's and the Church of the Open Door campuses
- Esther Snyder – co-founder of In-N-Out Burger
- Lynsi Snyder – owner of In-N-Out Burger
- Alex Solis – jockey
- Odo Stade – actor, author, and forest ranger best known for his collaboration with Mexican revolutionary Pancho Villa and for co-authoring the biography Viva Villa!
- Woody Strode – NFL football player, actor
- The Surfaris – surf music band
- Deontay Wilder – WBC World Heavyweight Champion 2015–2020, Olympic medalist 2008
- Shawn Wooten – MLB baseball player

== Sister cities ==
Glendora has 2 sister cities:

- Mōka (真岡市), Tochigi Prefecture, Japan

In 1984, after members of the Mōka High School Alumni Wind Orchestra stayed with local families in Glendora, the president of the Glendora Sister City Association sent a formal letter to Mōka regarding a potential sister-city relationship. Following reciprocal visits between the two cities, Glendora and Mōka officially became sister cities on October 1, 1988. For decades there has been an ongoing student exchange program between Goddard Middle School and Mōka Higashi Junior High School and between Sandburg Middle School and Nakamura Junior High School.

The flag of Mōka is displayed in Glendora's city council chambers next to the City of Glendora flag.

- Mérida, Yucatán, Mexico

In the summer of 1966, the City of Glendora established a sister city relationship with Mérida, the capital of Yucatán, which at the time had a population roughly ten times larger than Glendora's. In the years that followed, the two cities participated in exchange programs involving students, police officers, and firefighters, aimed at fostering mutual understanding and the sharing of professional knowledge. A lasting symbol of this relationship is a mural in the Bidwell Forum of the Glendora Public Library titled Aportaciones de la Cultura Maya y del Hombre Moderno (Contributions of the Mayan Culture and the Modern Man). It was painted by Mexican artists Manuel Lizama and Sergio Cuevas and completed in July 1976 as a gift from the city of Mérida. The Glendora Sister City Association was defunct from 2010 to 2023, during which time exchange programs between Mérida and Glendora fizzled out. With the association's revival in 2023, renewed efforts have been launched to restore active cultural exchanges and rebuild the partnership between the two cities.

== See also ==
- List of cities in Los Angeles County, California
- Alosta
- Charter Oak, California
