= Southern California real estate boom of the 1880s =

Phase of settlement, United States

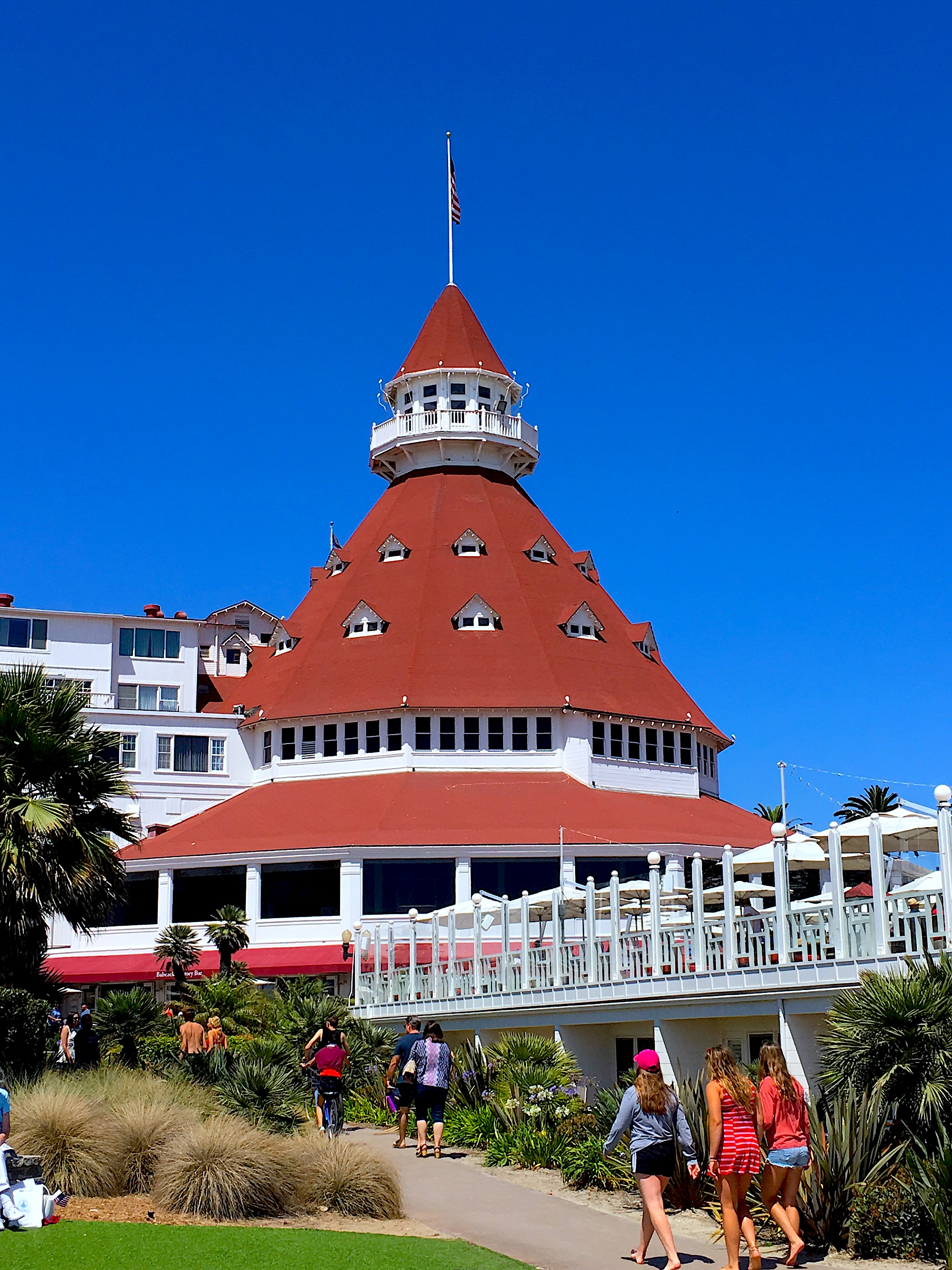
Building a resort hotel, such as the still-extant Hotel Del Coronado, at the site of the development, was standard operating procedure for 1880s Southern California land speculators

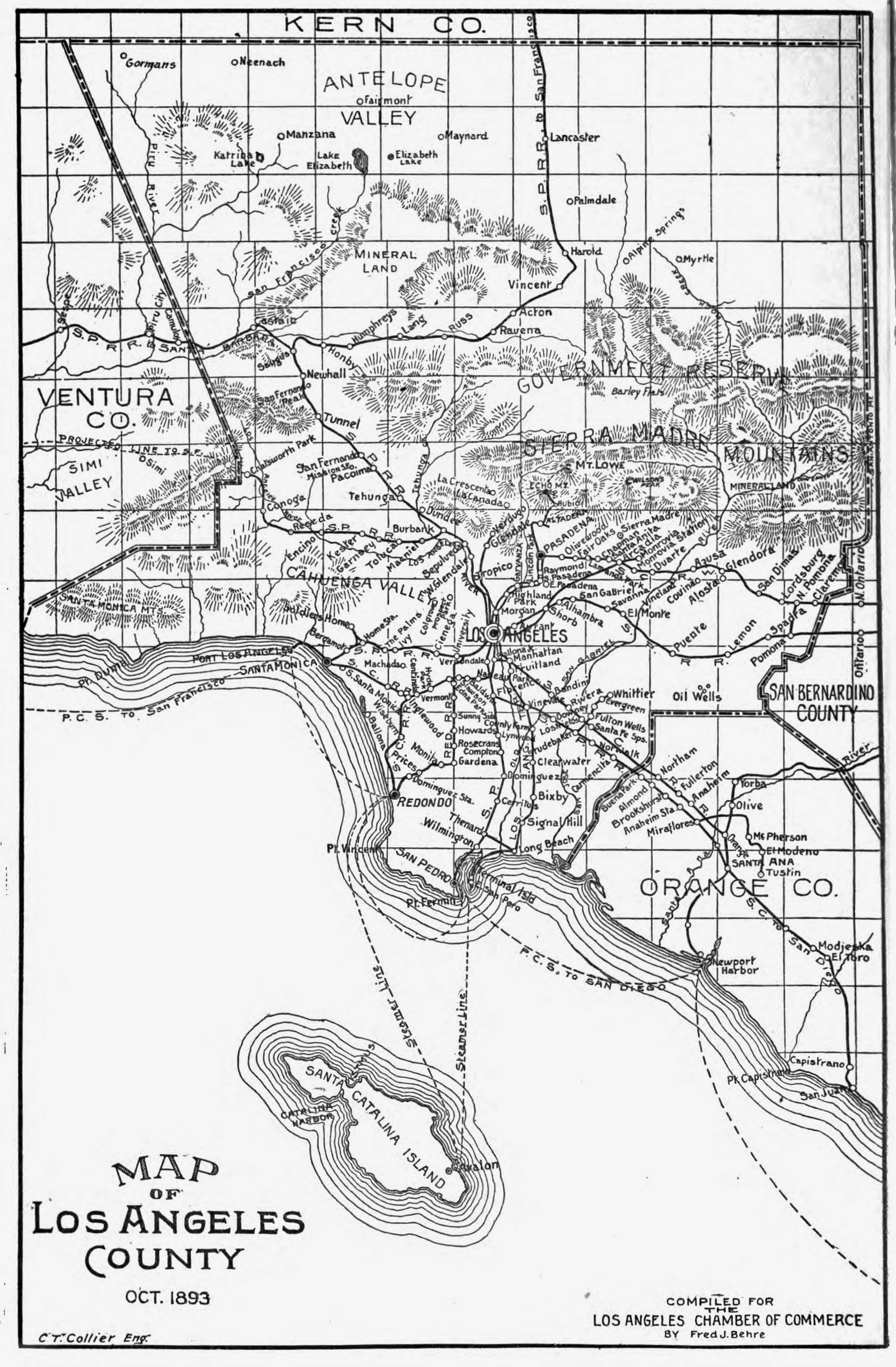
Map of Los Angeles County published October 1893 for the World's Columbian Exposition, after the 1887 boom but before the 1905 boom

The Southern California real estate boom of the 1880s, also the boom of the eighties, and sometimes just called the 1887 real estate boom, was the first big settlement push into Los Angeles County (including what is now Orange County), San Diego County (including what is now Imperial County), San Bernardino County (including what is now Riverside County), Santa Barbara County, Ventura County, and environs. Prompted by the arrival of the railroads, dozens of "paper towns" were platted and marketed between 1884 and the peak of the boom in July 1887, but the collapse of the market in 1888 meant that many of the planned communities went unbuilt. Some of the 1880s developments later grew into notable communities, others quickly vanished into history, several persisted for a time as railroad sidings or specks on a map and eventually lent their names to businesses, streets, and later residential subdivisions.

== History ==
According to Glenn Dumke, the "immediate cause of the boom is generally conceded to have been the rate war between the Southern Pacific and the Santa Fe." Whereas previously it had cost about $125 to get from Missouri to California by train, ticket prices dropped to single digits by March 1887. An estimated 120,000 people took advantage of this opportunity to come to California on the Southern Pacific alone.

Settlements in Los Angeles County founded during the 1887 boom included Alhambra, Altadena, Avalon (originally called Shatto), Burbank, Claremont, Duarte, Garvanza, Glendale, Glendora, Inglewood, Lamanda Park, Monrovia, North Hollywood (first known as Toluca, then Lankershim), Ontario, Redondo Beach, Sierra Madre, South Pasadena, and Upland (originally Magnolia).

Notable failures in Los Angeles County were called Chicago Park and Gladstone. Other proposed developments in Southern California that busted included Sunset, Hyde Park, Rosecrans, Walteria, Cahuenga, Port Ballona, Seabright, Ramona, Ivanhoe, Alosta, Lordsburg (now La Verne), Fairview, and many more.

Southern Pacific Railroad-adjacent towns (or railway sidings) established in the Los Angeles area in 1887 were Fillmore, Saugus, Bardsdale, Fernando, Pacoima, Tuni, Dundee, Burbank, Tropico, Aurant, Ramona, Shorb's, Nadeau, The Palms, Almond, and Sansevain.

Lots and land were rarely sold for cash but on contract with "one-third or one-fourth down, balance in semi-annual payments, was a common method. Another method was a small payment down, balance in small monthly payments." There was more than one case of outright fraud, as well as a great deal of promises unkept for one reason or another:

...in some of these new townsites that the most fictitious values were boosted. Rapid transportation in the way of electric or steam roads; magnificent hotels; colleges of applied sciences and manufacturing establishments were promised for the new town. If the new town site was situated in a river wash or a stony canyon, the sand and boulders were boosted as building material and thus became an asset; if the townsite was situated out on the desert, it was boosted as a natural health resort and was advertised largely in eastern magazines; if the townsite was situated on a hillside, the view was boosted; if the townsite was situated in a swamp, as was the case of Ballona, a fictitious harbor was boosted. The location of many of these new townsites made very little difference; the buyers never expected to live in them. The new arrivals from the East bought a lot and lay in wait for the tourist of the next day to unload on him at an advance. It was all a mere matter of pure speculation.

— Joseph Netz, 1915

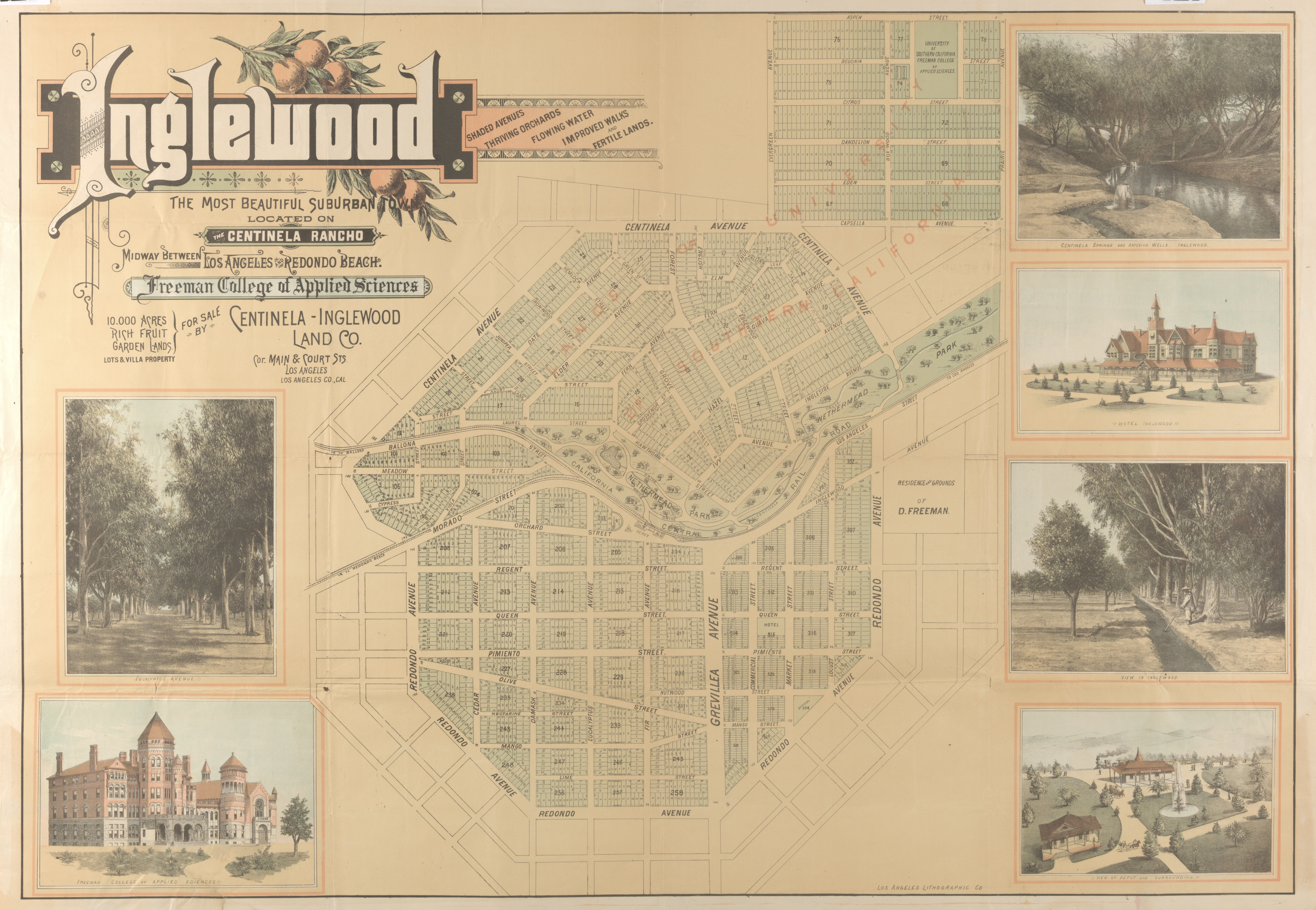
The Centinela-Inglewood Land Co. touted a "University of Southern California Daniel Freeman College of Applied Sciences" but it was never constructed

== See also ==
- History of rail transportation in California

== Sources ==
- "The Great Boom of 1886–'87". An illustrated history of Los Angeles County, California. 1889 – via HathiTrust.
- McWilliams, Carey (1973) [1946]. "Chapter VII. Years of the Boom". Southern California Country: An Island on the Land. American Folkways Series (Reprint ed.). Salt Lake City, Utah: Peregrine Smith Books. ISBN 0-87905-007-1. LCCN 73077787.
