= South Hills (California) =

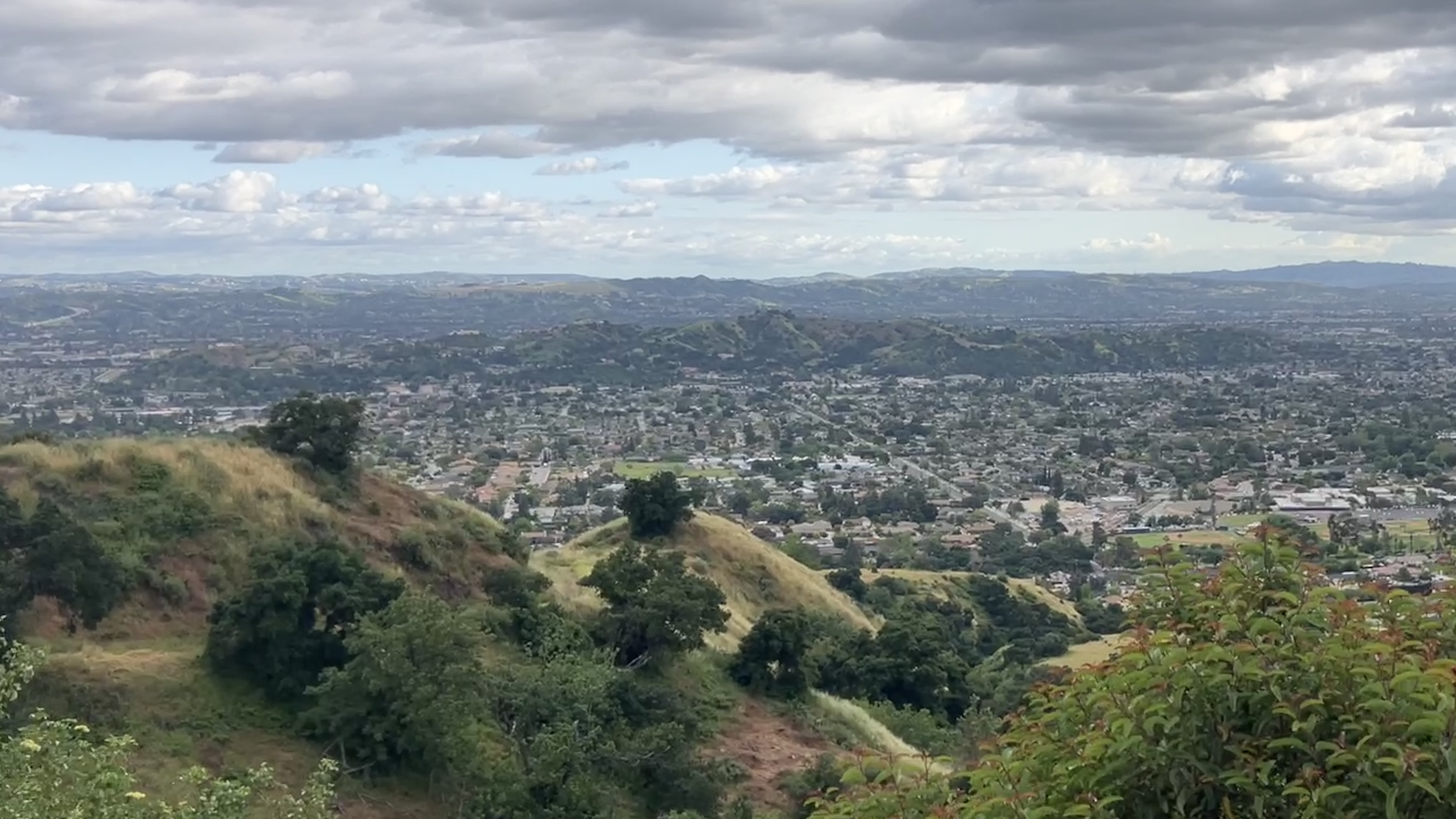
- View of the South Hills from the top of Colby Trail

Highest point
- Elevation: 370 m (1,210 ft)

Geography
- Location within California
- Country: United States
- State: California
- District: Los Angeles County
- Range coordinates: 34°7′16″N 117°50′50″W
- Topo map: USGS San Dimas
- Biome: Chaparral and coastal sage scrub

Geology
- Rock age: Miocene (approximately 15–17 million years ago)
- Rock type: Miocene volcanic rocks (Glendora Volcanics)

The South Hills are a low mountain range of the Transverse Ranges in eastern Los Angeles County, California. Located within the San Gabriel Valley, they rise in the southern portion of the city of Glendora between the San Gabriel Mountains and the larger Los Angeles Basin. Much of the hills consist of volcanic rock formed about 15–17 million years ago, when eruptions in this area produced lava flows that later hardened into stone. These rocks, known as the "Glendora Volcanics," form much of the hills today and help explain why they rise above the surrounding landscape. Their elevation ranges from 740 ft at the base to 1212 ft at their highest peak.

The South Hills are north of the Interstate 210 Freeway, in the southern part of the city of Glendora, with the western portion of the hills in the City of Glendora's South Hills Park. They are north of the unincorporated town of Charter Oak and northwest of the city of San Dimas.
