= Glendora Historical Society =

Nonprofit organization in California, US

- Formation: 1947
- Type: Nonprofit
- Legal status: 501(c)(3) nonprofit organization
- Purpose: Historical preservation, education, community building
- Headquarters: 314 N. Glendora Avenue, Glendora, CA 91741
- Region served: Glendora and surrounding communities
- Website: www.glendorahistory.org

The Glendora Historical Society is a nonprofit organization founded in 1947 dedicated to preserving and interpreting the history of Glendora, California, and the Upper San Gabriel Valley.

== History and founding ==
The Glendora Historical Society was established in 1947 by local residents who, in response to the social and economic changes across the region in the postwar era, wanted to preserve the memories, buildings, artifacts, and records related to the early history of Glendora and the surrounding area. Early activities included the collection of historical materials, the development of a museum and archive, and preserving oral histories of life in the area.

Membership in the Society is open to all individuals interested in local history. According to the Society, early members included men and women of different ages and backgrounds. The Society's first president was Ruth Kimball. Early board members included individuals from long-established local families, such as J. Walter Cullen, as well as more recent residents. H. Paul Keiser served as the Society's first curator and was involved in organizing its early collections.

== Preservation of historical sites ==
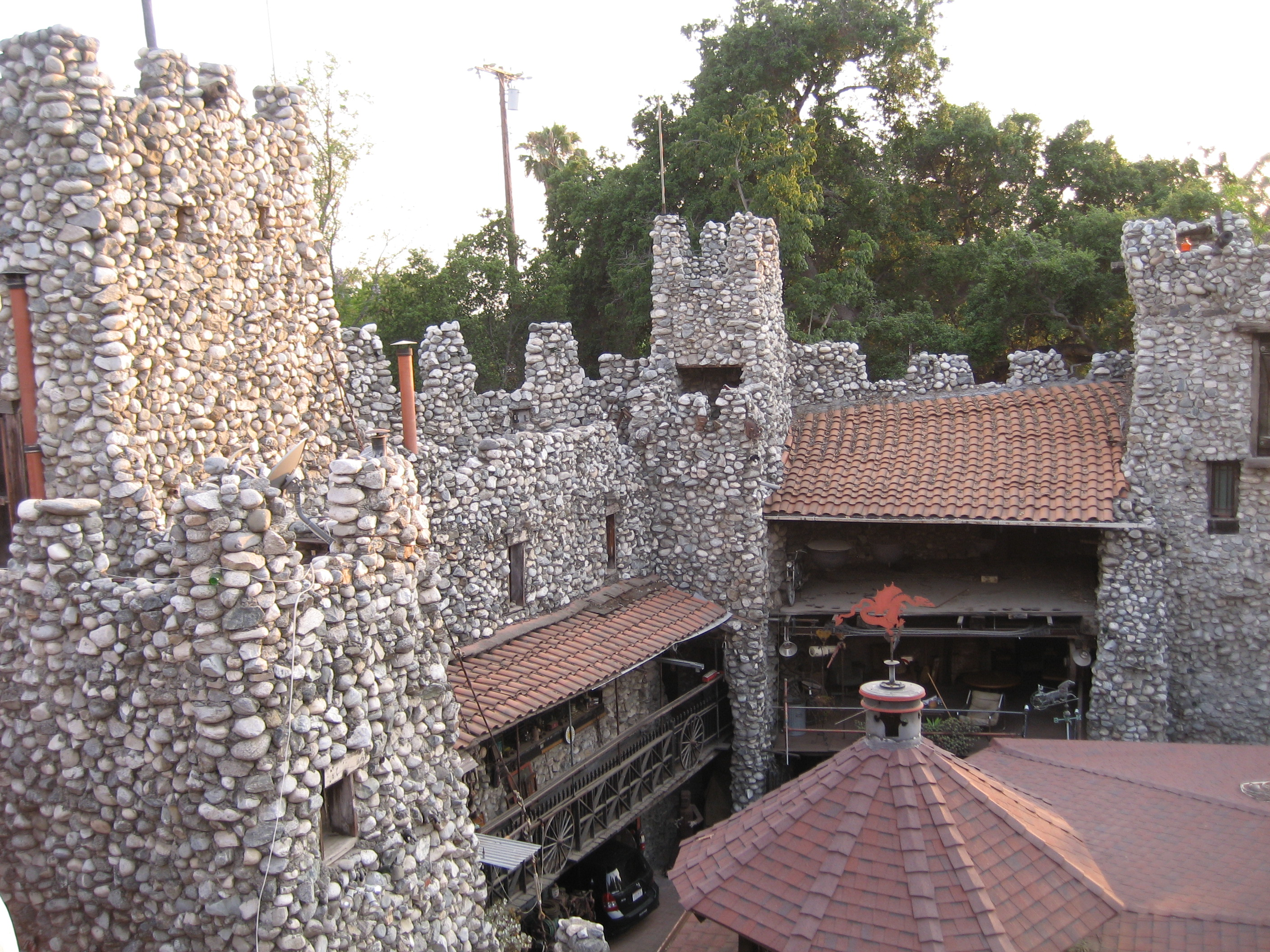
View from a Rubel Castle tower overlooking the courtyard

The Glendora Historical Society manages two primary historic sites: the Glendora Museum and the Rubel Castle.

The Glendora Historical Museum is located in the city's first firehouse, constructed in 1913. The building served as City Hall, police headquarters, and jail until 1922, later becoming the Society's headquarters. The museum houses photographs, documents, and artifacts related to the history of Glendora and the surrounding area.

Rubel Castle is a large, fortress-style structure constructed by Michael Rubel and a group of friends over several decades. It was listed on the National Register of Historic Places in 2013. The castle is located in Los Angeles County and is noted for its distinctive architectural form. In 2024, the Glendora Historical Society received a Preservation Award from the Los Angeles Conservancy in connection with preservation work at the Rubel Castle Historic District. That same year, the California Preservation Foundation recognized the project with a Preservation Design Award.

== See also ==
- List of historical societies in California
