= Glen A. Wilson High School =

Location
- 16455 Wedgeworth Drive; Hacienda Heights, California 91745; United States; 33.9987°N 117.9470°W

Information
- School type: Public high school
- Established: 1966
- School district: HLPUSD
- Principal: Danielle Kenfield
- Staff: 60.75 (FTE)
- Grades: 9-12
- Enrollment: 1,422 (2023–2024)
- Student to teacher ratio: 23.41
- Campus type: Suburban
- Colors: Cardinal; Gold
- Athletics conference: CIF Southern Section; Hacienda League
- Mascot: Wildcat
- Rival: Los Altos High School
- Newspaper: Paw Prints
- Yearbook: The Prowler
- Website: wihs.hlpschools.org

Glen A. Wilson High School is a public high school located in Hacienda Heights, California. It is one of two high schools located in the unincorporated community, and one of four in the Hacienda La Puente Unified School District.

== History ==
The school was founded in September 1965 on the campus of the neighboring Rowland High School in Rowland Heights, California, where students attended a split session year until the campus was ready for occupancy in September 1967.

The school was named for Dr. Glen A. Wilson, former Superintendent of the La Puente Union High School District (later the Hacienda La Puente Unified School District). Born in Alpaugh, California, on September 11, 1913, Wilson held bachelor's and master's degrees from Occidental College (1936, 1940), and a Doctorate in Education from the University of Southern California (1965).

He began his career in education as a 6th grade teacher in El Centro in 1937, and retired from education as superintendent of Hacienda La Puente Unified School District in 1972. He served in the Marine Corps during World War II from 1942–1946, and was discharged from active duty as a Battalion Quartmaster, First Lieutenant. He achieved the rank of Major in the USMC Reserve in 1952. He was named Citizen of the Year by the La Puente Valley Chamber of Commerce in 1965, served as Rotary District 530 Governor from 1972–1973, and received the Paul Harris Fellow award in 1972. He died in La Verne, California on September 7, 1996.

In 2008, Glen A. Wilson High School received media attention after a school shooting threat on the one year anniversary of the Virginia Tech shooting and around the anniversary of the Columbine High School shooting was posted on the school's Wikipedia page. These threats were referred to the local police. On Thursday, April 17, 2008, security was increased and students' backpacks were searched, and all after-school activities were cancelled. In addition, on Friday, April 18, 2008, school was cancelled as a precaution, although early that morning, a student was arrested in connection with the threats and held at Juvenile Hall.

== School demographics ==
The school had 1456 students in 2024-2025 academic year

The ethnic composition of the student body was:

- 45.5% Asian
- 44.9% Hispanic or Latino
- 3.6% White
- 2.7% Filipino
- 1.3% African American

== Athletics ==
The school's sport teams compete in the Valle Vista League to qualify for CIF Southern Section (CIF-SS). The Valle Vista League consists of the Wilson Wildcats, Rowland Raiders, San Dimas Saints, Covina Colts, Nogales Nobles, and Northview Vikings

Boys	Girls	Co-ed
Baseball	Basketball	Badminton
Basketball	Golf	Cross Country
Football	Soccer	Swimming
Golf	Tennis	Track
Soccer	Volleyball	
Tennis	Waterpolo	
Waterpolo	Softball	
Wrestling		

== Performing Arts ==
Glen A. Wilson High School has several visual and performing arts classes and ensembles, including visual arts classes, drama classes, and bands and orchestras. The Royal Wilson Marching Alliance, the school's highly regarded marching band, competes in the 6A Open Division on for SCSBOA and are frequently making it to Champs. There 2026 show, is titled ARC. They host the Glen. A Wilson Field Tournament every October.

== Notable alumni ==
- Brian Tee - actor, appeared in The Fast and the Furious: Tokyo Drift
- Lawrence Kao - actor, appears in Wu Assassins
- Jill Sterkel - Olympic swimmer and Hall of Famer, won four Olympic medals in freestyle swimming events, and was the first woman to be on four Olympic swim teams
- Josh Keaton - actor, voice actor, singer and music producer; voice of Spider-Man in The Spectacular Spider-Man
- David Lee (photographer) - photographer and publisher
- Scott Williams - former NBA Basketball player, led the school to a state championship in his senior year
- Fergie (Stacy Ferguson) - singer of The Black Eyed Peas and Wild Orchid
- Minae Noji - American actress, best known for the role of Karai on Teenage Mutant Ninja Turtles, Dr. Kelly Lee on General Hospital
- Dr. Dong H. Kim - director of the Mischer Neuroscience Institute at Memorial Hermann-Texas Medical Center, known for his role in the surgery and recovery of US Congressperson Gabrielle Giffords
- Melissa King - Top Chef: Boston (Season 12), Finalist. Top Chef: All-Stars LA (Season 17), Winner and Fan Favorite
