= South Hills High School (West Covina, California) =

Location
- 645 South Barranca Avenue; West Covina, California 91791; United States; 34°03′44″N 117°52′57″W

Information
- Type: Public Secondary
- Established: 1964
- Principal: Dr. Terry Abernathy
- Teaching staff: 68.09 (FTE)
- Grades: 9–12
- Enrollment: 1,624 (2023-2024)
- Student to teacher ratio: 23.85
- Colors: Green and Gold
- Athletics conference: Hacienda League
- Nickname: Huskies
- Website: South Hills High School

South Hills High School, often known by its abbreviation SHHS, is a public high school located in the hills of the eastern part of West Covina, California. There is a common misconception that it is in Covina, most likely because the school is in the Covina-Valley Unified School District rather than the West Covina Unified School District. South Hills opened in the fall of 1964.

== Architecture ==
The buildings were designed by architect Henry L. Gogerty (1894–1990) in the year 1963.

== Demographics ==
During the 1993–1994 school year, there were 1,306 students enrolled at the school. This has since grown, with 2,113 students enrolled during the 2007–2008 school year. Currently, enrollment stands at 1,650 students, of which 500 are transfer students on permit from other school districts.

Demographics by ethnicity; 2007–2008

- Hispanic/Latino: 25.1%
- White: 52.2%
- Asian: 11.0%
- African American: 6.7%
- Filipino: 3.2%
- Pacific Islander: 0.5%
- American Indian/Alaska Native: 0.5%
- Multiple or no response: 1.8%

As of the 2024-2025 school year, South Hills high school has maintained around the same enrollment number of 1,624 students. The current Demographic population is vastly different

- Hispanic/Latino: 78.3%
- White: 7.4%
- Asian: 9.6%
- African American: 2.4%
- Multiple or no response: 2.0%

== Athletics ==
South Hills competes in the CIF Southern Section in the Hacienda League. Prior to the 2014–15 school year South Hills had been a part of the Sierra League.

The arch-rivals of the South Hills athletic teams have changed throughout the years with its membership in different leagues. While in the Valle Vista League, the rivals were Northview and Covina. After the school's entry into the San Antonio League, a rivalry developed with West Covina High School. While SHHS was a part of the Sierra League, the rivalry was with Charter Oak.

The Husky softball team won CIF-SS championships in 1982 and 1997 and advanced to the finals in 1983, 2010, and 2011. For the 2011 season, the Huskies moved from Div. V to Division 3. In the upcoming 2013 season, the Huskies will be competing in Division 2. The head coach was Scott Fisch (1988–2013).

The Husky cross country teams won four CIF division III championships in 1999 under head coach Bill Reeves, with individual championships from Jesse Hodges and Rocio Ferree and both team championships.

After winning the Palomares league in 2017 and the Hacienda league in 2018, the 2018 varsity football team became the first team in school history to record a perfect season. Under head coach Matt Bechtel, the team finished with a 14-0 record as Hacienda League Champions and CIF division VI champions with a 23-14 win over Oxnard High School. Over the 14 games, the Huskies outscored their opponents 460-144.

== Notable alumni ==
- Jacob Amaya, professional baseball shortstop for the Chicago White Sox of Major League Baseball.
- Jeff Cox – Major League Baseball player/coach
- David Denson – baseball player
- Deorro - American DJ and Producer
- Ty France – Major League Baseball player
- Jason Giambi – Major League Baseball player
- Jeremy Giambi – Major League Baseball player
- Derek Klena – Broadway actor, singer, and Baseball player
- Cory Lidle – Major League Baseball player
- Chris Limahelu – USC football player
- Milt McColl – National Football League player
- Ke Huy Quan – Vietnamese-American actor
- Mitrice Richardson – dancer
- Matthew Rogers – Television host and country singer, American Idol finalist, 2004 season
- Aaron Small – Major League Baseball player
- Paul Tollett – President and CEO of Goldenvoice, co-founder of Coachella
- Shawn Wooten – Major League Baseball player, minor-league manager

== Encore! TV Series ==
In 2017 ABC aired the reality TV special Encore!, starring Kristen Bell, which took place at South Hills High School and reunited eight cast members from the 1997 production of Into the Woods, inviting them to perform it again 20 years later. The original Cast of Encore included Carrie Commerford, Graham Beightol, Mark-Eugene Garcia, Christy Carson Ratray, Dan Silva, Kait Holbrook, Billy Vitale and Kristen Snowden.
