= Covina High School =

Location
- 463 South Hollenbeck Avenue; Covina, California 91723; United States; 34°4′51″N 117°54′2″W

Information
- Type: Public
- Established: 1897
- School district: Covina-Valley Unified School District
- Principal: Daisy Carrasco
- Faculty: 52.50 (FTE)
- Grades: 9–12
- Enrollment: 1,198 (2018-19)
- Student to teacher ratio: 22.82
- Colors: Cardinal and white
- Athletics conference: CIF Southern Section; Valle Vista League
- Nickname: Colts
- Rival: Northview High School
- Yearbook: The Cardinal
- Website: covinahigh.c-vusd.org

Covina High School, commonly known as Covina High or CHS to the students, is a public high school located in Covina, California. Covina High School is one of three comprehensive high schools within the Covina-Valley Unified School District. Established in 1897, Covina High is the first and oldest high school in the school district and is accredited by Western Association of Schools and Colleges. There were approximately 1,650 students enrolled for the 2010–11 school year.

Covina High School is one of the oldest establishments in Covina. Its original campus, Covina Union High School, was located off of S. Citrus Ave and W. Puente St. and was opened in 1897, just a few years before Covina became an incorporated city. Covina High School moved to its current location on Hollenbeck Ave. in 1956 and opened for instruction on September 17 of that year.

The teaching staff includes fifty-six regular education teachers and six special education teachers. Additional personnel include the school principal, two assistant principal, a student activities director, three counselors, and two library clerks.

The school's mascot is the colt. The school colors are cardinal and white. The school's rival is Northview High School.

== Athletics ==
Covina competes in the CIF Southern Section: Valle Vista League with Baldwin Park High School, Northview High School, San Dimas High School, Nogales High School, and Glen A. Wilson High School.

As of 2013, Baldwin Park High School has left the Valle Vista League and has gone into the Miramonte League.

Boys Sports : Baseball, Basketball, X-country, Football, Wrestling, Soccer, Swimming, Tennis, Track and Field. Girls Sports : Volleyball, X-country, Tennis, Basketball, Wrestling, Soccer, Swimming, Softball, Track and Field.

== Notable alumni ==
- Pamela Beaird, former television actress.
- Herschel Daugherty, former television, film and theatre director.
- Donald W. Evans, Jr., Medal of Honor recipient.
- Hussein Mohamed Farrah Former President of Somalia, he graduated in 1981.
- Jonathan D. Farrar, Ambassador to the Republic of Panama (2012–Present)
- Tommy Haynes, former NFL and USFL Player
- Jim Hanifan, former NFL Player and Coach
- Ward Kimball, one of the original Disney animators, and leader of the Dixieland band Firehouse Five Plus Two, he won an Academy Award, he was a member of the Covina High School class of 1929.
- Mike Lynn, former NBA Player (Los Angeles Lakers, Buffalo Braves)
- Paula Jean Myers-Pope, 3-time Olympic Diver and 4-time medalist (3 silvers, 1 bronze) for Team USA
- Brett Pill, former professional baseball player for the San Francisco Giants
- Rex Richardson, mayor of Long Beach, California
- Don Rose, major league baseball player (California Angels, San Francisco Giants, New York Mets)
- Robert Garcia, mayor of Long Beach, California. Graduated Class of 1995.
- Francia White, American opera singer and radio and television personality during the 1930s and 1940s.
