= Bob Wicks =

American football player (born 1950)

No. 42, 49
- Position: Wide receiver

Personal information
- Born: July 24, 1950 (age 76); Pasadena, California, U.S.
- Listed height: 6 ft 3 in (1.91 m)
- Listed weight: 200 lb (91 kg)

Career information
- High school: Royal Oak (Covina, California)
- College: Utah State (1968–1971)
- NFL draft: 1972: 8th round, 188th overall pick

Career history
- St. Louis Cardinals (1972); San Diego Chargers (1973); Green Bay Packers (1974); New Orleans Saints (1974)

Career NFL statistics
- Receptions: 1
- Receiving yards: 8
- Stats at Pro Football Reference

Robert Blaine Wicks (born July 24, 1950) is an American former professional football player. He played college football for the Utah State Aggies and was selected in the eighth round of the 1972 National Football League (NFL) draft by the St. Louis Cardinals. He played in the NFL as a wide receiver for two seasons, appearing for the Cardinals, Green Bay Packers and New Orleans Saints.

== Early life ==
Wicks was born on July 24, 1950, in Pasadena, California. He grew up competing in football, baseball, basketball, and track and field. Starting in fourth grade and continuing through college, he was often teammates with quarterback John Strycula, who lived nearby. Wicks attended Royal Oak High School in Covina, California, along with Strycula, where he played football as an end and safety. He was the first Royal Oak alumnus to play in the NFL. He was All-Hacienda League as a junior and as a senior in 1967, he was named first-team all-league at both end and safety. In addition to football, he was also an all-league performer in basketball at Royal Oak. Wicks accepted a scholarship to play college football for the Utah State Aggies, where he was joined by Strycula.

== College career ==
With the freshman team in 1968 at Utah State, Wicks played "anything and anywhere". In addition to playing defensive back and as a backup tailback, he was also used as a return specialist, recording a 70-yard punt return touchdown against Snow College. He debuted for the varsity team in 1969 against Wichita State but suffered an injury that limited him for the rest of the season. Nevertheless, he was a starter at wide receiver and caught 19 passes for 272 yards, scoring two touchdowns in the season finale.

In 1970, Wicks helped Utah State compile a record of 5–5 while being among the nation's leading receivers and punt returners. He caught 47 passes for 642 yards and had 16 punt returns for 279 yards and two touchdowns, averaging 17.4 yards per return. He then caught a team-leading 58 passes for 862 yards as a senior while Utah State compiled a record of 8–3. That year, he set the Utah State single-season record with 58 receptions, set the career record with 124 total receptions, and tied the school's single-game receptions record (13) while setting the single-game receiving yards record (211) against Idaho. He scored a total of 10 touchdowns at Utah State and was invited to the Senior Bowl at the conclusion of his collegiate career.

== Professional career ==
Wicks was selected by the St. Louis Cardinals in the eighth round (188th overall) of the 1972 NFL draft. He signed his rookie contract in May 1972 and ended up making the team's final roster. Wicks made his NFL debut in the Cardinals' Week 1 win over the Baltimore Colts and appeared in the team's first nine games, recording one catch for eight yards. Following Week 9, he was sent to the Cardinals' taxi squad. He was released by the Cardinals on September 5, 1973. On October 31, 1973, he signed with the San Diego Chargers, though he was later released without playing in a game.

In 1974, Wicks signed with the Green Bay Packers. He made the final roster and appeared in the team's Week 1 loss to the Minnesota Vikings. He was mainly used on special teams for the Packers and then was released soon after his only game with the team. In November, he signed with the New Orleans Saints. He played for the Saints in the final five games of the season on special teams. He announced his retirement from professional football in July 1975, finishing his career with 15 games played and one reception for eight yards.

== Later life ==
With his wife, Kitty, Wicks has three sons and a daughter. Following his football career, he worked in Covina for a bus company before joining All Pack Company, Inc., a packaging business owned by his wife's parents. He worked for the business until his retirement and moved to Arizona in 2015. He also competed in softball tournaments.
