= South San Jose Hills, California =

- Census-designated place
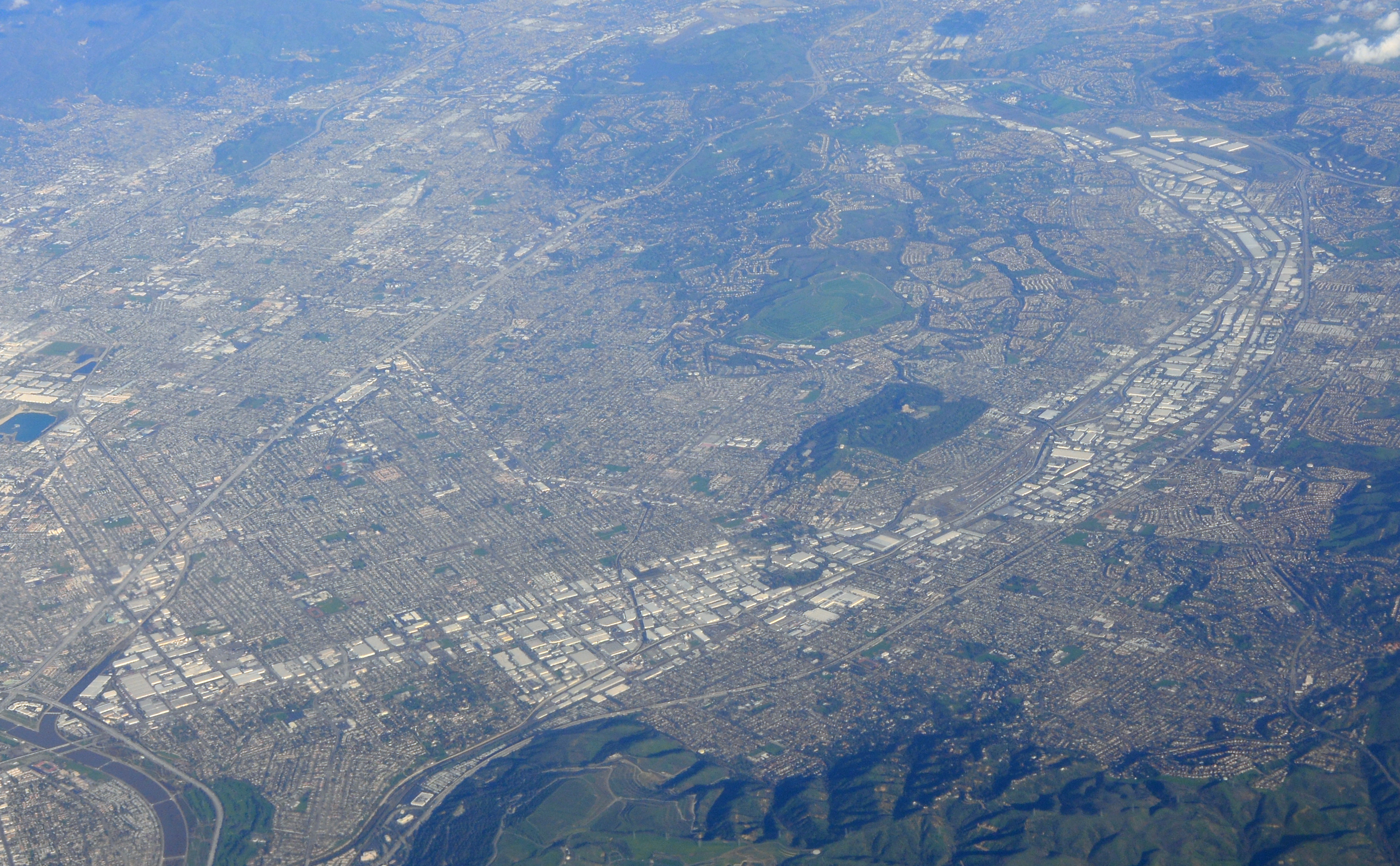
- Aerial view looking ENE toward east City of Industry (lower left) and South San Jose Hills (upper right), 2026.
- Interactive map of South San Jose Hills, California
- Location in the United States
- Coordinates: 34°0′41″N 117°54′17″W
- Country: United States
- State: California
- County: Los Angeles

Area
  - Total: 1.498 sq mi (3.879 km^{2})
  - Land: 1.498 sq mi (3.879 km^{2})
  - Water: 0 sq mi (0 km^{2}) 0%
- Elevation: 417 ft (127 m)

Population (2020)
  - Total: 19,855
  - Density: 13,260/sq mi (5,119/km^{2})
- Time zone: UTC-8 (PST)
  - Summer (DST): UTC-7 (PDT)
- ZIP code: 91744
- Area code: 626
- FIPS code: 06-73290
- GNIS feature ID: 1867058

South San Jose Hills is an unincorporated community and census-designated place in the San Gabriel Valley of Los Angeles County, California, United States. The population was 19,855 at the 2020 census, down from 20,551 at the 2010 census.

== Geography ==
South San Jose Hills is an unincorporated, mainly residential community located on the southern end of the San Jose Hills, which forms a part of San Gabriel Valley.

South San Jose Hills is bounded by City of Industry to the south, La Puente to the west, West Covina to the north, and Walnut to the east. The community is accessible via the Pomona Freeway (State Route 60), which runs just south of the community. The ZIP code serving the community is 91744. Most addresses do not use South San Jose Hills as the city but rather La Puente, West Covina, or Valinda, depending on the location of the residence or business. Parts of the area are nicknamed Happy Homes, based on the former name of the development and on the street gang that later took that name.

== Demographics ==
Historical population
Census	Pop.	Note	%±
1970	12,386		—
1980	16,049		29.6%
1990	17,814		11.0%
2000	20,218		13.5%
2010	20,551		1.6%
2020	19,855		−3.4%
U.S. Decennial Census; 1860–1870 1880-1890; 1900 1910 1920; 1930 1940 1950; 1960 1970 1980; 1990 2000 2010; 2020

South San Jose Hills first appeared as an unincorporated place in the 1970 U.S. census as part of the East San Gabriel Valley census county division; and as a census designated place in the 1980 United States census.

=== Racial and ethnic composition ===
South San Jose Hills CDP, California – Racial and ethnic composition Note: the US Census treats Hispanic/Latino as an ethnic category. This table excludes Latinos from the racial categories and assigns them to a separate category. Hispanics/Latinos may be of any race.
Race / Ethnicity (NH = Non-Hispanic)	Pop 2000	Pop 2010	Pop 2020	% 2000	% 2010	% 2020
White alone (NH)	1,450	853	612	7.17%	4.15%	3.08%
Black or African American alone (NH)	302	231	162	1.49%	1.12%	0.82%
Native American or Alaska Native alone (NH)	39	20	27	0.19%	0.10%	0.14%
Asian alone (NH)	1,294	1,602	2,332	6.40%	7.80%	11.75%
Native Hawaiian or Pacific Islander alone (NH)	66	22	28	0.33%	0.11%	0.14%
Other race alone (NH)	14	34	64	0.07%	0.17%	0.32%
Mixed race or Multiracial (NH)	185	76	113	0.92%	0.37%	0.57%
Hispanic or Latino (any race)	16,868	17,713	16,517	83.43%	86.19%	83.19%
Total	20,218	20,551	19,855	100.00%	100.00%	100.00%

=== 2020 census ===
As of the 2020 census, South San Jose Hills had a population of 19,855. The population density was 13,254.3 inhabitants per square mile (5,117.5/km^{2}). 100.0% of residents lived in urban areas, while 0.0% lived in rural areas.

The census reported that 99.9% of the population lived in households, 0.1% lived in non-institutionalized group quarters, and no one was institutionalized.

Racial composition as of the 2020 census
Race	Number	Percent
White	2,659	13.4%
Black or African American	210	1.1%
American Indian and Alaska Native	476	2.4%
Asian	2,366	11.9%
Native Hawaiian and Other Pacific Islander	32	0.2%
Some other race	10,635	53.6%
Two or more races	3,477	17.5%
Hispanic or Latino (of any race)	16,517	83.2%

There were 4,402 households, of which 48.4% had children under the age of 18 living in them. Of all households, 55.7% were married-couple households, 5.4% were cohabiting couple households, 15.1% had a male householder with no spouse or partner present, and 23.8% had a female householder with no spouse or partner present. About 8.1% of all households were made up of individuals and 4.1% had someone living alone who was 65 years of age or older. The average household size was 4.51. There were 3,919 families (89.0% of all households).

The age distribution was 23.5% under the age of 18, 11.4% aged 18 to 24, 28.6% aged 25 to 44, 24.3% aged 45 to 64, and 12.3% who were 65 years of age or older. The median age was 34.5 years. For every 100 females, there were 99.5 males, and for every 100 females age 18 and over there were 98.4 males age 18 and over.

There were 4,499 housing units at an average density of 3,003.3 per square mile (1,159.6/km^{2}). Of these, 4,402 (97.8%) were occupied; 72.7% were owner-occupied and 27.3% were occupied by renters. The homeowner vacancy rate was 0.7% and the rental vacancy rate was 1.5%.

=== 2010 census ===
At the 2010 census South San Jose Hills had a population of 20,551. The population density was 13,628.8 inhabitants per square mile (5,262.1/km^{2}). The racial makeup of South San Jose Hills was 9,302 (45.3%) White (4.2% Non-Hispanic White), 304 (1.5%) African American, 195 (0.9%) Native American, 1,649 (8.0%) Asian, 30 (0.1%) Pacific Islander, 8,449 (41.1%) from other races, and 622 (3.0%) from two or more races. Hispanic or Latino of any race were 17,713 persons (86.2%).

The census reported that 20,524 people (99.9% of the population) lived in households, 27 (0.1%) lived in non-institutionalized group quarters, and no one was institutionalized.

There were 4,112 households, 2,507 (61.0%) had children under the age of 18 living in them, 2,565 (62.4%) were opposite-sex married couples living together, 730 (17.8%) had a female householder with no husband present, 405 (9.8%) had a male householder with no wife present. There were 215 (5.2%) unmarried opposite-sex partnerships, and 22 (0.5%) same-sex married couples or partnerships. 285 households (6.9%) were one person and 122 (3.0%) had someone living alone who was 65 or older. The average household size was 4.99. There were 3,700 families (90.0% of households); the average family size was 4.86.

The age distribution was 6,250 people (30.4%) under the age of 18, 2,596 people (12.6%) aged 18 to 24, 5,791 people (28.2%) aged 25 to 44, 4,274 people (20.8%) aged 45 to 64, and 1,640 people (8.0%) who were 65 or older. The median age was 29.7 years. For every 100 females, there were 101.4 males. For every 100 females age 18 and over, there were 98.7 males.

There were 4,239 housing units at an average density of 2,811.2 per square mile, of the occupied units 3,131 (76.1%) were owner-occupied and 981 (23.9%) were rented. The homeowner vacancy rate was 1.0%; the rental vacancy rate was 3.2%. 15,294 people (74.4% of the population) lived in owner-occupied housing units and 5,230 people (25.4%) lived in rental housing units.

According to the 2010 United States Census, South San Jose Hills had a median household income of $50,864, with 16.2% of the population living below the federal poverty line.

=== 2023 American Community Survey ===
In 2023, the US Census Bureau estimated that the median household income was $94,740, and the per capita income was $26,013. About 9.2% of families and 12.8% of the population were below the poverty line.

== Politics ==
In the state legislature, South San Jose Hills is located is in the 30th senatorial district, represented by Democrat Bob Archuleta, and in the 48th Assembly district, represented by Democrat Blanca Rubio. Federally, South San Jose Hills is in California's 31st congressional district, represented by Democrat Gil Cisneros. At the county level, South San Jose Hills is part of Los Angeles County's first district and is currently represented by Hilda Solis.

Locally, South San Jose Hills is represented by a variety of local officials through local districts. In terms of water districts, the area by elected representatives on the Rowland Water District (division 1 and division 3), and Upper San Gabriel Valley Municipal Water District (division 3). In education, elected school board trustees from the Rowland Unified School District (area 2, 3, and 5) also represent the area.

== Education ==
South San Jose Hills is located within the boundaries of the Rowland Unified School District.

High schools

- Nogales High School
- Santana High School

Middle Schools

- Giano Intermediate

K-8 Academies

- Telesis Academy

Elementary Schools

- Hurley elementary
- Northam elementary
- Rorimer elementary
- Villacorta elementary
- Yorbita elementary
