= Diamond Bar High School =

Location
- 21400 Pathfinder Road; Diamond Bar, California 91765; United States; 33°58′57″N 117°50′21″W

Information
- Type: Public
- Established: 1982; 44 years ago
- School district: Walnut Valley Unified School District
- CEEB code: 050748
- NCES School ID: 064128007894
- Principal: Courtney Corona
- Grades: 9–12
- Enrollment: 2,557 (2022–23)
- Student to teacher ratio: 1:25
- Colors: Purple; Gold
- Athletics conference: Hacienda League
- Mascot: Brahma
- Rival: Walnut Mustangs
- Accreditations: WASC
- Publication: The Bull's Eye
- Yearbook: The Taurus
- Website: dbhs.wvusd.org

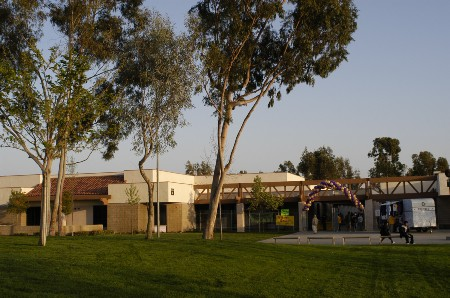
The Diamond Bar High School campus as of May 2024, prior to the completion of multiple planned renovations.

Diamond Bar High School (DBHS) is a public high school located in Diamond Bar, California, as part of the Walnut Valley Unified School District.

Diamond Bar High School's mascot is the Brahma, and the school colors are purple and gold. Diamond Bar High School students participate in programs such as Advanced Placement (AP) and International Baccalaureate (IB). During the school year, DBHS received an Academic Performance Index of 870, and 97% of students passed the California High School Exit Exam in 2008-2009. Most of Diamond Bar High School's students come from Chaparral Middle School and South Pointe Middle School, both located in Diamond Bar.

== History ==
Diamond Bar High School was founded in 1982, and was the growing city's first high school. Diamond Bar High School is part of the Walnut Valley Unified School District, which has also been ranked by numerous sources to be one of the top public school districts in all of Southern California. Diamond Bar High's first students were residents that lived in south Diamond Bar (specifically residents that lived south of Diamond Bar's Grand Avenue). Prior to the opening of Diamond Bar High, the area's students were bused from Diamond Bar to Walnut High School. Some of the teachers came from Suzanne Middle School, Chaparral Middle School and Walnut High School. The first principal of the school was Walt Holmes, who came to DBHS from North Monterey County High School in Castroville, California, where he also served as principal.

== Academic programs ==
Diamond Bar High School has a rigorous and competitive atmosphere for a public high school. It is ranked 54 on a list of the best California high schools.

=== Pathways Communications Academy ===
Pathways is a program offered to all students during their freshman year. The program offers different courses and class schedules. The curriculum includes a broad range of college preparatory courses and work experience classes.

== Notable alumni ==
- Jonathon Amaya; football, Miami Dolphins
- Desiree Burch; comedian, actor, theatre maker, and presenter
- Gary Brown; baseball, St. Louis Cardinals
- Mike Burns; baseball, Cincinnati Reds
- Ling Ling Chang; Republican state senate member
- Charlet Chung; actress, best known for voice acting in video games such as Overwatch and Call of Duty: Black Ops III
- Danny Dorn; baseball, Arizona Diamondbacks
- Jim Edmonds; baseball, St. Louis Cardinals, Cardinals Hall of Famer, 2006 World Series Champion
- Danny Im; member of Korean hip hop group 1TYM
- Peyrin Kao; lecturer and activist
- Bret Lockett; football, New England Patriots
- Nadia Mejia; Miss California USA 2016, placed in the top 5 at Miss USA 2016; crowned Miss Universe Ecuador 2025
- Ippei Mizuhara; longtime friend of and interpreter for Los Angeles Dodgers superstar Shohei Ohtani, until his firing for alleged gambling improprieties.
- Alex Morgan; soccer, USWNT captain, 2012 London Olympic Gold Medalist, 2015 World Cup Champion, 2019 World Cup Champion
- Kevin Na; golf, PGA Tour professional, four-time PGA Tour winner, also attended South Pointe Middle School
- Donte Nicholson; football, Tampa Bay Buccaneers
- Teddy Park; record producer/rapper under YG Entertainment in South Korea, member of Korean hip hop group 1TYM
- Jessica Penne; professional mixed martial artist, inaugural Invicta FC Atom-weight Champion, currently competing in the UFC Straw-weight Division
- Devyn Puett; former child actress/singer/dancer, now real estate agent
- Ryan Satin; former cast member, Laguna Beach: The Real Orange County and WWE correspondent for Fox Sports
- Rachel Scott; senior political correspondent, ABC News
- Sahith Theegala; golf, PGA Tour professional, one-time PGA Tour winner
- Keith Van Horn; basketball, Dallas Mavericks
- Ryan Wendell; football, New England Patriots, Super Bowl XLIX Champion
- Jason Wright; football executive and businessman, Washington Football Team
- Tiffany Young; member of Girls' Generation
