= Tommy Haynes (American football) =

American football player (born 1963)

No. 27
- Position: Safety

Personal information
- Born: February 6, 1963 (age 63); Chicago, Illinois, U.S.
- Listed height: 6 ft 0 in (1.83 m)
- Listed weight: 190 lb (86 kg)

Career information
- High school: Covina (Covina, California)
- College: USC
- NFL draft: 1985: undrafted

Career history
- Portland Breakers (1985); Dallas Cowboys (1986); Los Angeles Rams (1987)*; Dallas Cowboys (1987)
- * Offseason or practice squad member only

Awards and highlights
- First-team All-Pac-10 (1984)

Career NFL statistics
- Games played: 3
- Stats at Pro Football Reference

Thomas Walton Haynes (born February 6, 1963) is an American former professional football player who was a safety for the Dallas Cowboys of the National Football League (NFL). He also was a member of the Portland Breakers in the United States Football League (USFL). He played college football for the USC Trojans.

== Early life ==
Haynes attended Covina High School, where he was two-way player at defensive back and wide receiver. He received All-San Gabriel Valley honors as a senior. He also practiced baseball and basketball.

He enrolled at Mt. San Antonio College for two years. He transferred to the University of Southern California after his sophomore season. As a junior, he was named a starter at cornerback, tallying one interception.

As a senior, he led the team with 5 interceptions. In the 1985 Rose Bowl against Ohio State University, he contributed to the 20-17 win by making 2 interceptions.

== Professional career ==
=== Portland Breakers (USFL) ===
Haynes was selected by the Los Angeles Express of the United States Football League in the 1985 USFL Territorial Draft. On February 21, he signed with the Portland Breakers. He started 12 games at safety, making one interception.

=== Dallas Cowboys (first stint) ===
In July 1985, he was signed as a free agent by the Dallas Cowboys. He was released after the second preseason game on August 19. In 1986, he was re-signed and placed on the injured reserve list with a thumb injury on August 26. He was cut midway through the season.

=== Los Angeles Rams ===
In 1987, he was signed as a free agent by the Los Angeles Rams. He was released on September 1.

=== Dallas Cowboys (second stint) ===
After the NFLPA strike was declared on the third week of the 1987 season, those contests were canceled (reducing the 16 game season to 15) and the NFL decided that the games would be played with replacement players. Haynes was signed to be a part of the Dallas replacement team that was given the mock name "Rhinestone Cowboys" by the media. He started all 3 games at strong safety, making 23 tackles, 3 interceptions (led the team), 6 passes defensed (led the team) and 3 sacks (tied for the team lead). He led the team with 8 tackles, 2 sacks and one interception against the New York Jets. He had 2 interceptions and one sack against the Washington Redskins. He was cut on October 26, at the end of the strike.

In 1988, he was re-signed to participate in training camp. He was released on August 8.
