= Walnut Valley Unified School District =

School district in California, United States

Address
- 880 South Lemon Avenue Walnut, California, 91789; United States

District information
- Type: Public
- Motto: "KIDS FIRST... Every Student, Every Day"
- Grades: K–12
- President: Layla Abou-Taleb
- Vice-president: Y. Tony Torng
- Superintendent: Robert P. Taylor
- School board: Cynthia M. Ruiz; Helen M. Hall; Larry L. Redinger
- Schools: See Schools
- NCES District ID: 0641280

Students and staff
- Students: 13,493 (2020–2021)
- Teachers: 557.49 (FTE)
- Staff: 599.62 (FTE)
- Student–teacher ratio: 24.2:1

Other information
- Website: www.wvusd.org

The Walnut Valley Unified School District is located in the eastern portion of Los Angeles County and is a part of the Greater Los Angeles Area of the U.S. state of California. It serves the majority of Walnut, the southern portion of Diamond Bar and a very small portion of West Covina. The school district has been ranked by numerous sources to be one of the top public school districts in all of Southern California.

== Schools ==
The district contains 9 elementary schools, 3 middle schools, 2 regular high schools, and 1 continuation high school.

=== Elementary schools ===
- Castle Rock Elementary (Diamond Bar)
- Collegewood Elementary (Walnut)
- Cyrus J. Morris Elementary (Walnut)
- Evergreen Elementary (Diamond Bar)
- Leonard G. Westhoff Elementary (Walnut)
- Maple Hill Elementary (Diamond Bar)
- Quail Summit Elementary (Diamond Bar)
- Vejar Elementary (Walnut)
- Walnut Elementary (Walnut)

=== Middle schools ===
- Chaparral Middle School (Diamond Bar)
- South Pointe Middle School (Diamond Bar/Walnut)
- Suzanne Middle School (Walnut)

=== High schools ===
- Walnut High School (Walnut)
- Diamond Bar High School (Diamond Bar)
- Ron Hockwalt Academies (Walnut)
