= Walnut High School =

Location
- 400 N. Pierre Rd. Walnut, California 91789; United States; 34.02193°N 117.85033°W

Information
- School type: Public
- Motto: To Teach and Learn Every Day
- Established: 1968; 58 years ago
- NCES School ID: 064128006843
- Principal: Jamie Norell
- Staff: 93
- Enrollment: 2,138 (2022–2023)
- Colors: Blue and Gold
- Fight song: Sons of Westwood
- Athletics conference: Hacienda League
- Mascot: Mustang
- Rival: Diamond Bar High School
- Accreditations: WASC
- Newspaper: The Hoofprint
- Yearbook: The Cayuse
- Athletic facility: Ken Gunn Stadium
- Website: www.walnuths.net

Walnut High School is a public high school located at Walnut, California, among the San Jose Hills of the San Gabriel Valley in Southern California.

Walnut High School is also located within the Walnut Valley Unified School District, which has also been ranked by sources to be one of the top public school districts in all of Southern California. The school is a two-time National Blue Ribbon School (1992–93 and 1997–98), six-time California Distinguished school (1991, 1992, 1994, 1998, 2005 and 2009), and a California Gold Ribbon School (2017). Walnut High School has offered the International Baccalaureate program since 1999.

== Athletics ==
The Mustang Athletic teams compete in the Palomares League of the CIF Southern Section offering 22 seasonal sports.

The Walnut High football team contends in Division 11 of CIF Southern Section.

In the aquatics program, the water polo team won a CIF championship, and both the water polo and swim teams won league titles.

The soccer program has won two CIFSS 1-A Championships (1990, 1992), including an undefeated season in 1992 (25–0–1).

Walnut's Girls' Golf Team won league titles in 2013, 2014, 2015, and 2016. The Walnut High School Girls Golf Team won their first CIF State title in 2016.

Walnut's National Champion Dance Team holds fifteen national titles, seven CADTD State titles, and were undefeated in the state of California from 2016 to 2019.

The Lady Mustangs (Girls Soccer Team) won the CIFss in 2002, 2003, 2004.

Walnut's Boys' Cross Country Team won CIF State Div 2 in 1987 and CIF Southern Section Div 2 in 1986 and 1987.

Walnut's Baseball Team won The CIF-SS Division 3 Championships in 2017.

Walnut Girls' Wrestling Team won CIF-SS Masters in 2019.

Walnut Girls' Wrestling Team won CIF State Championship in 2024

== Notable alumni ==
- Paul Caligiuri, National Soccer Hall of Fame and 1990 FIFA World Cup soccer player. Played professionally in Germany and for the Los Angeles Galaxy
- Gerardo Mejia, Ecuadorian rapper and singer, most famously known for his song, "Rico Suave"
- Tod McBride, former NFL defensive back
- Lance Parrish, former MLB catcher
- Juliana Yendork, triple jumper
- Gary Zimmerman, former NFL offensive lineman
- Agassi Goantara, Indonesian Professional basketball player
- Dwight Ramos, Filipino-American Professional basketball player
- Brian Calderón Tabatabai, former Mayor of West Covina
