= Walnut Islands, California =

Unincorporated community in California, United States

- Unincorporated area
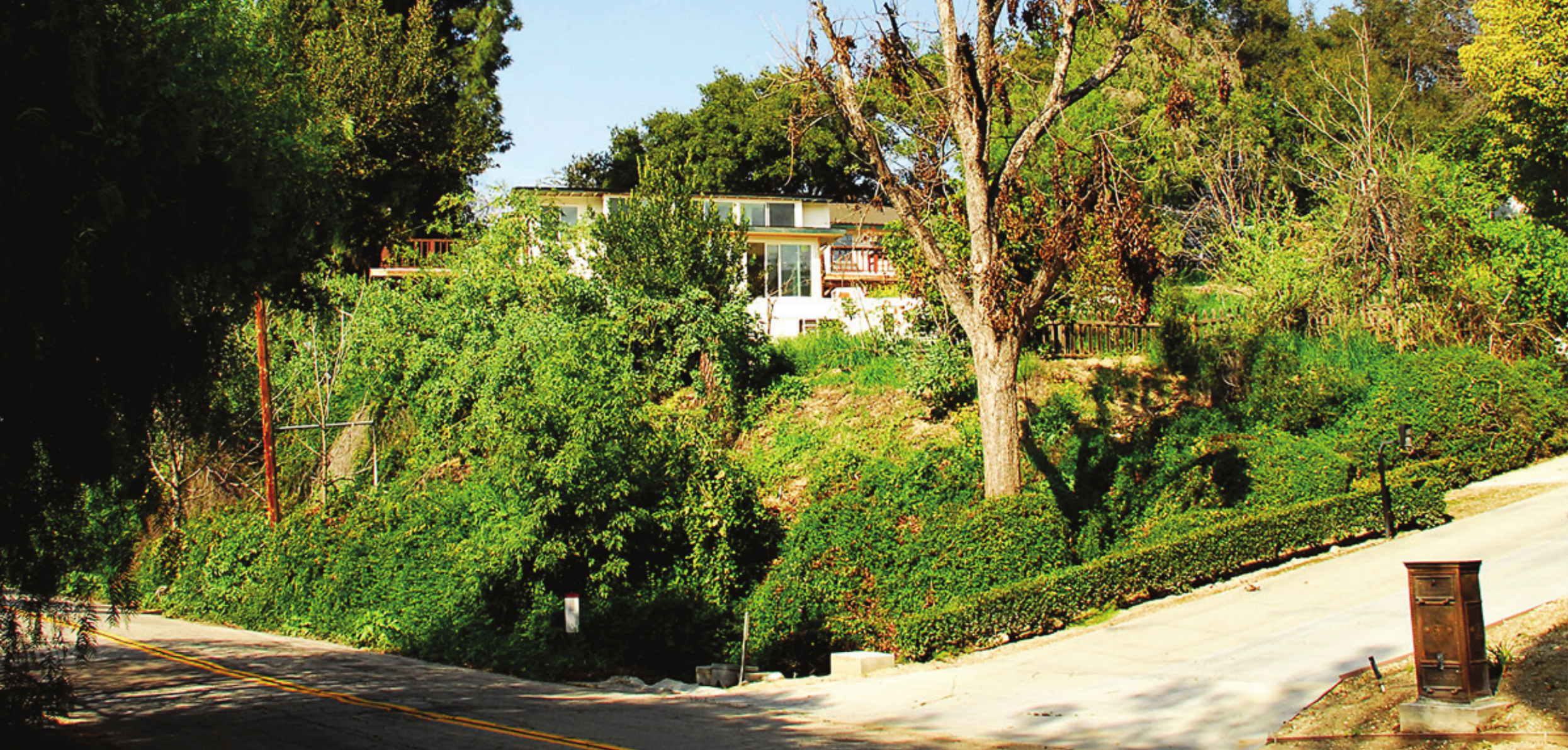

- Location in the United States Walnut Islands, California (the United States)
- Coordinates: 34°3′55″N 117°50′24″W
- Country: United States
- State: California
- County: Los Angeles

Area
  - Total: 3.8 sq mi (9.8 km^{2})

Population (2000)
  - Total: 4,053
  - Density: 1,122/sq mi (433/km^{2})
- Time zone: UTC-8 (PST)
  - Summer (DST): UTC-7 (PDT)
- ZIP code: 91724, 91768, 91789
- Area codes: 626, 909

Walnut Islands or Ramona is an unincorporated area in the San Gabriel Valley of the eastern part of Los Angeles County in the U.S. state of California. The former is the technical term used by the county government, while the latter was used by the Los Angeles Times in 2008 and the LA Metro. One news report referred to the area as Covina Hills. Walnut Islands is surrounded by the cities of Covina and San Dimas to the north, Walnut to the south, West Covina to the west, and Pomona to the east. The population of Ramona was 4,053 according to the 2000 census.

== History ==
The land in Walnut Islands was historically used for agriculture.

== Geography ==
Walnut Islands has a total area of 3.8 square miles (2,400 acres). It is situated in a low point in the San Jose Hills.

== Demographics ==
There were 4,053 people living in Walnut Islands, according to the 2000 US Census. The population density was 1,122 inhabitants per square mile. The racial makeup of the area was 35.0% Asian, 32.3% White, 26.3% Latino, 3.0% African American, and 3.4% from other races. The average household size was 3.1. The age distribution was 15.4% 10 and under, 11.5% from 11 to 18, 18.5% from 19 to 34, 24.6% from 35 to 49, 15.9% from 50 to 64, and 14.1% 65 or older. The median age was 37 years. The median household income was $86,325. (in 2008 dollars)

== Economy ==
=== Employers ===
There is no commercial land in Walnut Islands, California. However, there are institutions in the area, such as Forest Lawn – Covina Hills and Cal Poly Pomona, that employ people.

== Government and infrastructure ==
In the California State Legislature, Walnut Islands is in the 29th senatorial district, represented by Democrat Eloise Reyes, and in the 55th Assembly district, represented by Democrat Isaac Bryan. In the United States House of Representatives, it is split between California's 32nd congressional district, represented by Democrat Brad Sherman, and California's 39th congressional district, represented by Democrat Mark Takano.

The area is bounded by Interstate 10 to its south.

== Education ==
The area is mostly served by the Covina-Valley Unified School District, with students attending schools in the southeastern corner of the district, such as South Hills High School.
