= San Jose Edison School =

Charter school in California, United States

Information
- School type: Charter school
- Established: 1998; 28 years ago
- Grades: K-8
- Website: www.sanjosecharteracademy.com

San Jose Charter Academy is a charter school serving students in kindergarten through eighth grade in West Covina, California.

== About ==
San Jose Charter Academy opened in 1998 as a kindergarten through fifth grade school. The school later expanded to include sixth through eighth grades. The school holds 8 core values as the foundation for building good character and ethics. The core values are Justice, Integrity, Wisdom, Courage, Compassion, Responsibility, Respect, and Hope. In 2009 San Jose Charter Academy won the National Blue Ribbon School award. They won it again in 2016.
