= Mark Clear =

American baseball player (born 1956)

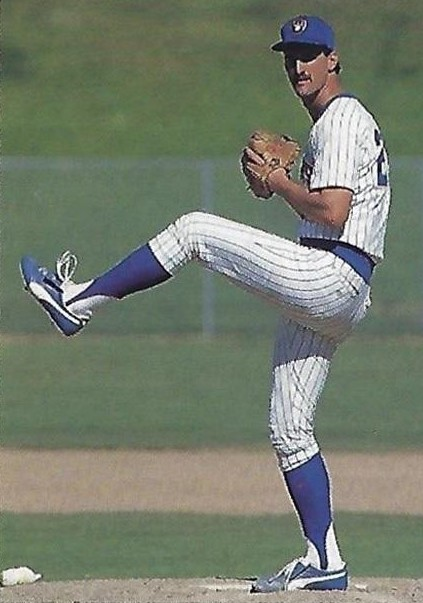
- Pitcher
- Born: May 27, 1956 (age 69); Los Angeles, California, U.S.
- Batted: Right Threw: Right

MLB debut
- April 4, 1979, for the California Angels

Last MLB appearance
- May 16, 1990, for the California Angels

MLB statistics
- Win–loss record: 71–49
- Earned run average: 3.85
- Strikeouts: 804
- Saves: 83
- Stats at Baseball Reference

Teams
- California Angels (1979–1980); Boston Red Sox (1981–1985); Milwaukee Brewers (1986–1988); California Angels (1990)

Career highlights and awards
- 2× All-Star (1979, 1982)

Mark Alan Clear (born May 27, 1956) is an American former two-time All Star Major League Baseball relief pitcher who played for the California Angels (1979–80, 1990), Boston Red Sox (1981–85), and Milwaukee Brewers (1986–88). He batted and threw right-handed.

== Early life ==
Clear was born in Los Angeles and attended Northview High School in Covina, California. He attended Mount San Antonio College in Walnut, California.

Clear's uncle is Bob Clear, who was a minor league pitcher in the 1940s and 1950s, and a coach with the California Angels from 1976 to 1986.

== Professional career ==
The Philadelphia Phillies selected Clear in the eighth round of the 1974 MLB draft. A hard curveballer with shaky control, Clear was a flexible set-up man, and an occasional closer as well. Twice he struck out 100-plus batters without starting a game (becoming the first pitcher to do so), and pitched 100 or more innings in three different seasons.

In 1979, Clear was an All Star and came in 19th in voting for the American League MVP. That year he won the June AL Pitcher of the Month Award. He was 11–5 with a 3.63 earned run average (ERA). His 14 saves were 7th-most in the American League.

On July 6, 1980, Clear won the AL Pitcher of the Week Award. He was traded along with Carney Lansford and Rick Miller from the Angels to the Red Sox for Rick Burleson and Butch Hobson five months later on December 10, 1980.

In 1982, Clear was again voted an All Star, and finished the season with a career-high 14 wins and 109 strikeouts. He had a 3.00 ERA in 105 innings, and his 14 saves were 9th-most in the American League. His 2.20 ERA and 16 saves in 1986 were career bests, and his 16 saves were 8th-most in the American League. In May of that season, Clear won the AL Pitcher of the Month Award.

In his 11-year career, Clear compiled a 71–49 record with a 3.85 ERA, 83 saves, and 804 strikeouts in 804.1 innings.

== See also ==
- List of Major League Baseball leaders in games finished
