= John A. Rowland High School =

John Rowland High School
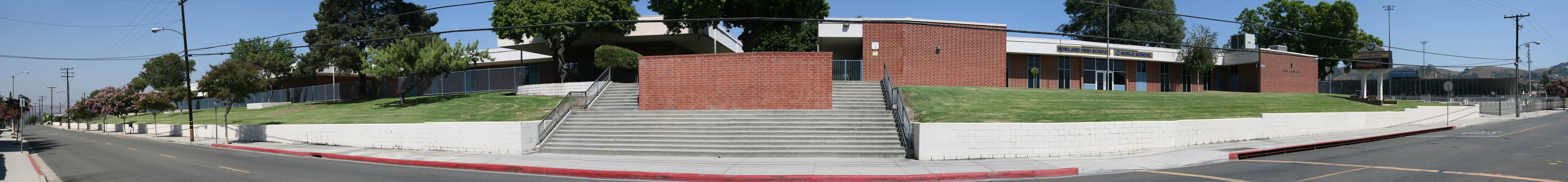

Location
- 2000 S. Otterbein St; Rowland Heights, California, United States; 33°58′51″N 117°53′23″W

Information
- Type: Public
- Established: 1964
- School district: Rowland Unified School District
- CEEB code: 052696
- Principal: Mitchell Brunyer
- Faculty: 114
- Teaching staff: 82.69 (FTE)
- Grades: 9–12
- Enrollment: 1,954 (2023–2024)
- Student to teacher ratio: 23.63
- Campus type: Suburban
- Colors: Navy and old gold
- Athletics conference: CIF Southern Section; Valle Vista League
- Mascot: Raiders
- Rival: Nogales High School
- Accreditations: WASC
- Yearbook: Saga
- Website: www.rowlandhs.org

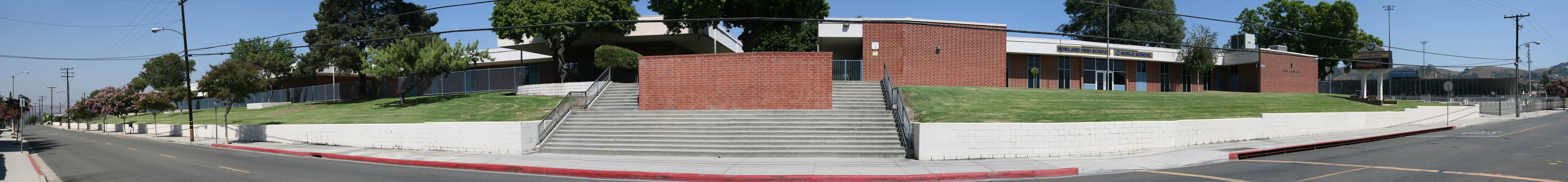
John A. Rowland High School

John A. Rowland High School is a public, four-year high school and International Baccalaureate (IB) World School in the unincorporated area of Rowland Heights, California, United States. It is one of the two high schools in the Rowland Unified School District. It is located directly across from one of the district's elementary schools, Killian Elementary School.

Rowland High School received a six-year WASC accreditation in 2007 as well as being named a California Distinguished School in 1996 and 2004, and a National Blue Ribbon School in 1998. Rowland High School was named a Gold Ribbon School in 2017.

== Renovation ==
The school entered a period of building and renovating; the initial conceptual designs were presented in 2013, and the process of modernization started in 2017. Renovations planned for the high school included additional new buildings, such as a two-story classroom building, a two-story building that replaced the previous administration and library buildings, a multipurpose room, and a new performing arts center, among other upgrades. The project was completed in September 2019.

== Athletics ==
Rowland participates in the Hacienda League of the CIF Southern Section.

=== CIF Southern Section Championships ===
- Boys' basketball (1976)
- Boys' gymnastics (1982)
- Boys' cross country (1988)
- Boys' water polo (1994, 1995, 1997, 1998, 1999, 2000)
- Girls' water polo (2003, 2004)
- Girls' soccer (1997)
- Girls' swimming (2018)
- Boys' swimming (2017, 2018)
- Boys' tennis (2024)
- Coed badminton (2026)

== Notable alumni ==
- Lanhee Chen (1995) - Policy Director of the Mitt Romney presidential campaign, 2012 and Romney's chief policy adviser; Senior Adviser of the Marco Rubio presidential campaign, 2016; member of the U.S. Social Security Advisory Board
- Mark Crear (1987) - two-time Olympic medalist; ordained minister
- Dave Hansen (1986) - Major League Baseball player
- Mike Hohensee (1979) - former head coach of the Albany Firebirds; current head coach of the Chicago Rush
- Al Martin (1985) - Major League Baseball player
- Aja Naomi King (2003) -Actress (How to Get Away With Murder, The Birth of a Nation) and Spokesperson for L’Oréal.
- Elizabeth Hernandez(1996) Rowland High School cheerleader and local bank robber.
