= Covina-Valley Unified School District =

School district in California, United States

Location
- 519 East Badillo Street; Covina, CA 91723 San Gabriel Valley United States

District information
- Motto: Educational Excellence for Every Student, Every Day
- Grades: Preschool, K-12, adult
- Established: March 26, 1896
- Superintendent: Elizabeth Eminhizer
- Accreditations: Western Association of Schools and Colleges
- Schools: 18 elementary schools, 4 middle schools, 5 high schools, 1 online learning academy

Students and staff
- Students: Approximately 11,713

Other information
- Website: www.c-vusd.org

Covina-Valley Unified School District (C-VUSD) is a unified school district located in Covina, California, United States. C-VUSD serves most of Covina, a large portion of West Covina, small portions of Glendora, Irwindale and San Dimas and the unincorporated communities of Citrus, Ramona and Vincent.

On June 15, 2020, the board of education appointed Elizabeth Eminhizer to serve as the superintendent of the Covina-Valley Unified School District.

== Schools ==
There are four high schools (including one continuation), three middle schools, and nine elementary schools in the district. There is also one online learning program, Covina-Valley Learning Options Academy.

=== High schools ===
- Covina High School
- Fairvalley High School (continuation)
- Northview High School
- South Hills High School

=== Middle schools ===
- Las Palmas Middle School
- Sierra Vista Middle School
- Traweek Middle School

=== Elementary schools ===
- Barranca Elementary School (Honor Roll School 2023)
- Ben Lomond Elementary School
- Cypress Elementary School
- Grovecenter Elementary School
- Manzanita Elementary School
- Merwin Elementary School
- Mesa Elementary School
- Rowland Avenue Elementary School
- Workman Elementary School

== Enrollment ==
Enrollment in the 2020–2021 school year was 11,332. The majority of students are Hispanic with a significant White and Asian minority and a smaller African American and Filipino minority. The district ethnic breakdown was as follows:

- 78.8% Hispanic
- 6.9% White
- 6.9% Asian
- 2.7% African American
- 3.0% Filipino
- 0.2% Pacific Islander
- 0.3% Native American and Alaska Native
- 1.2% Multiple or no response

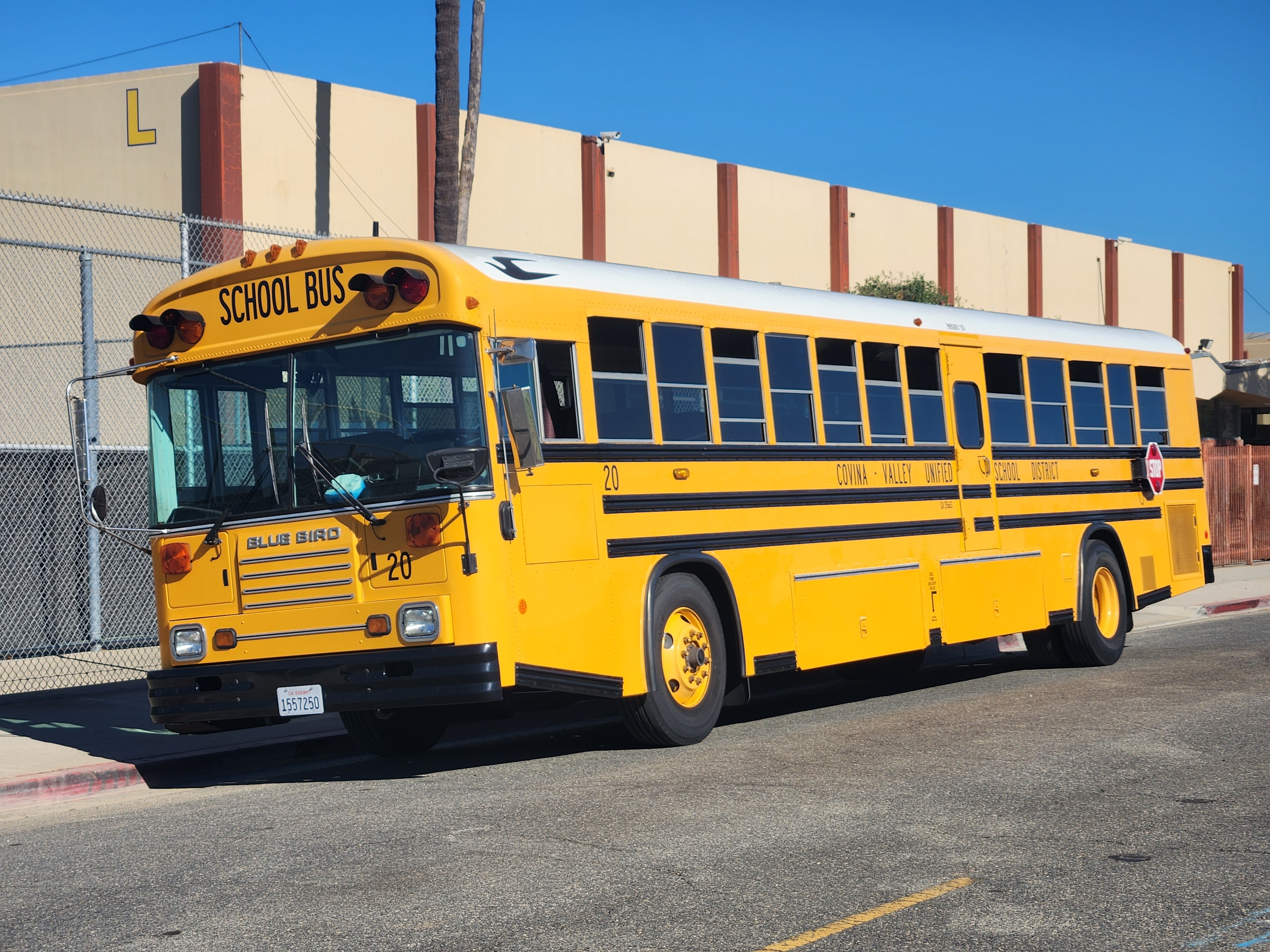
A Blue Bird TC/2000 RE school bus of Covina-Valley USD.
