= Rowland Unified School District =

School district in California, United States

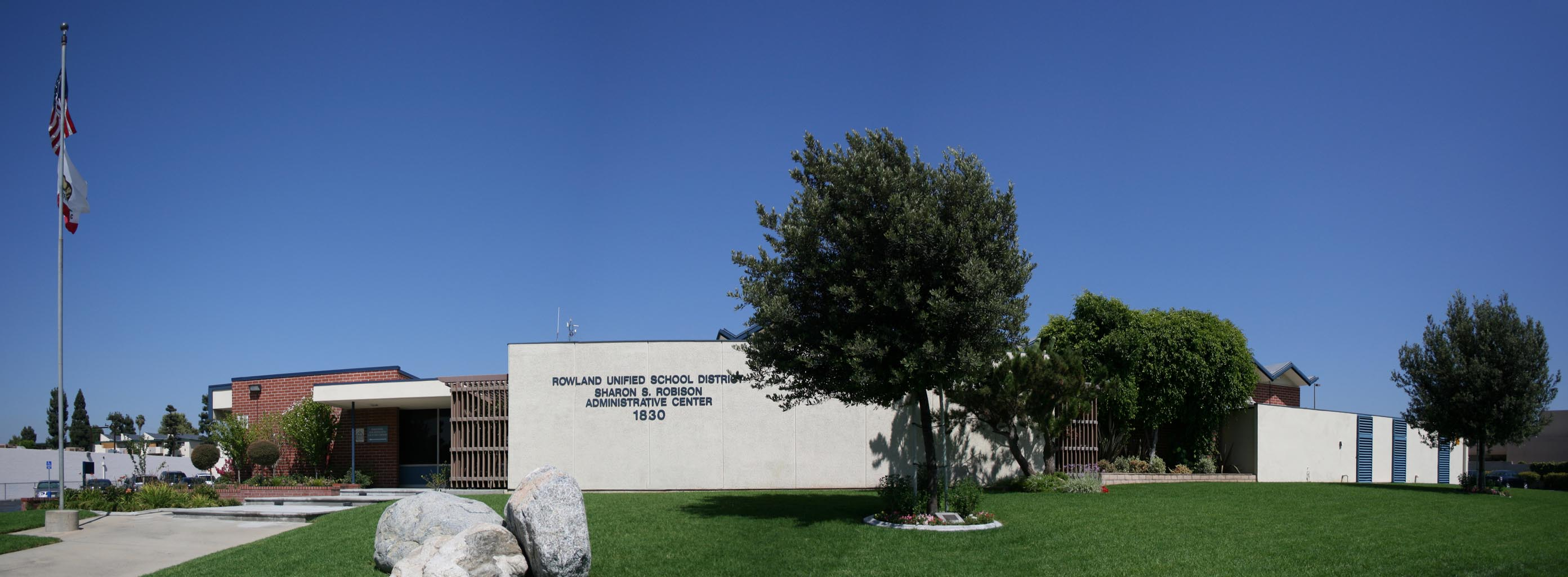
- Sharon S. Robison Administrative Center, district headquarters

Address
- 1830 South Nogales Street Rowland Heights, California, 91748; United States

District information
- Type: Public
- Grades: Pre-K–12
- Superintendent: Alejandro Flores
- Asst. superintendent(s): Dennis Bixler; Brian Huff; Rosana McLeod
- School board: Erik Venegas; Ellen Park; Agnes Gonzalez; Cary Chen; Kevin Hayakawa
- Chair of the board: Agnes Gonzalez
- NCES District ID: 0633750

Students and staff
- Students: 12,741
- Teachers: 542.15
- Staff: 758.94
- Student–teacher ratio: 23.5

Other information
- Website: www.rowlandschools.org

Rowland Unified School District (RUSD) is a public pre-K-12 school district in the San Gabriel Valley, Los Angeles County, California. Its headquarters are in Rowland Heights, an unincorporated area in the county. Academic programs include honors, Advanced Placement (AP), Gifted and Talented Education (GATE), Advancement Via Individual Determination (AVID), International Baccalaureate (IB), Career Pathways, Dual Immersion (Mandarin and Spanish), Music, Arts, and Athletics.

RUSD, with 23 schools and over 16,000 students (as of 2011), serves Rowland Heights, small portions of the cities of Industry, La Puente, Walnut, and West Covina and the entire unincorporated community of South San Jose Hills.

== Schools ==
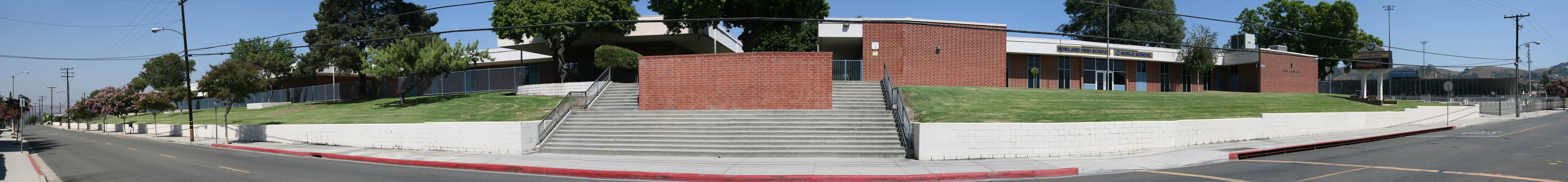
John A. Rowland High School

=== High schools ===
- Nogales High School
- Rowland High School

=== Adult school ===
- Rowland Adult and Community Education

=== Alternative schools ===
- Community Day School
- Santana High School
- Rowland Assistive Technology Academy

=== K–8 schools ===
- Stanley G. Oswalt Academy [K-6/7-8]
- Ybarra Academy of the Arts and Technology [K-6/7-8]
- Telesis Academy of Science and Math [K-6/7-8]

=== Intermediate schools (Middle) ===
(7–8)

- Alvarado Intermediate School
- Giano Intermediate School

=== Primary schools (Elementary) ===
(K-6)

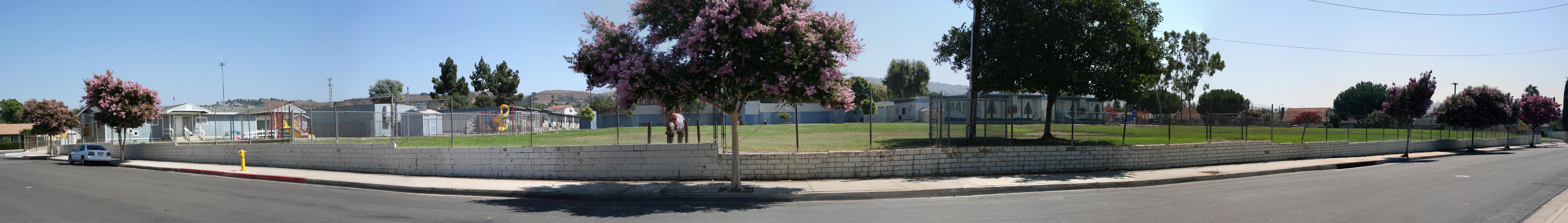
Killian Elementary School

- Blandford
- Hollingworth
- Hurley
- Jellick
- Killian
- Northam
- Rorimer
- Rowland
- Shelyn
- Villacorta
- Yorbita

On each elementary school campus besides Oswalt, RUSD has preschool programs.

== Board of Education ==
The Rowland Unified School District Board of Education is composed of five members who are elected to serve 4 year terms via a by-trustee area election process. The plurality elections are held in November of even-numbered years.
