= Mike Lynn (basketball) =

American basketball player (born 1945)

Personal information
- Born: November 25, 1945 (age 80) Covina, California, U.S.
- Listed height: 6 ft 7 in (2.01 m)
- Listed weight: 215 lb (98 kg)

Career information
- High school: Covina (Covina, California)
- College: UCLA (1964–1968)
- NBA draft: 1968: 4th round, 39th overall pick
- Drafted by: Chicago Bulls
- Position: Small forward
- Number: 33, 19

Career history
- 1969–1970: Los Angeles Lakers
- 1970–1971: Buffalo Braves

Career highlights
- 2× NCAA champion (1965, 1968); First-team All-AAWU (1966)
- Stats at NBA.com
- Stats at Basketball Reference

Michael Edward Lynn (born November 25, 1945) is an American former professional basketball player. He won two NCAA championships playing college basketball for the UCLA Bruins, then played professionally for two seasons in the National Basketball Association (NBA).

Lynn, a 6'7 forward from Covina High School in Covina, California, played for UCLA from 1964 to 1968. He won a championship as a sophomore (1965) and again as a fifth-year senior starter in 1968. Lynn was suspended for the 1966–67 championship year due to legal trouble concerning a credit card reported lost. He was a first-team All-AAWU pick as a junior in 1966.

After his collegiate career ended, Lynn was drafted twice by the NBA – first in the 1967 NBA draft by the San Francisco Warriors (fifth round, #51 overall) and again in the 1968 NBA draft by the Chicago Bulls (fourth round, #39 overall). He played two NBA seasons from 1969 to 1971, his first for the Los Angeles Lakers and his second for the Buffalo Braves. For his career, Lynn averaged 2.6 points and 1.4 rebounds in 49 games.

== Career statistics ==
Legend
GP	Games played	GS	Games started	MPG	Minutes per game
FG%	Field goal percentage	3P%	3-point field goal percentage	FT%	Free throw percentage
RPG	Rebounds per game	APG	Assists per game	SPG	Steals per game
BPG	Blocks per game	PPG	Points per game	**Bold**	Career high

=== NBA ===
==== Regular season ====
Year	Team	GP	MPG	FG%	FT%	RPG	APG	PPG
1969–70	L.A. Lakers	**44**	**9.2**	**.331**	.646	**1.5**	**.7**	**2.7**
1970–71	Buffalo	5	5.0	.286	**1.000**	.8	.2	1.4
Career		49	8.7	.329	.667	1.4	.6	2.6

==== Playoffs ====
Year	Team	GP	MPG	FG%	FT%	RPG	APG	PPG
1970	L.A. Lakers	3	2.0	.667	–	.7	.3	1.3
