= Benjamin Hermalin =

American professor, academic administrator

Benjamin E. Hermalin
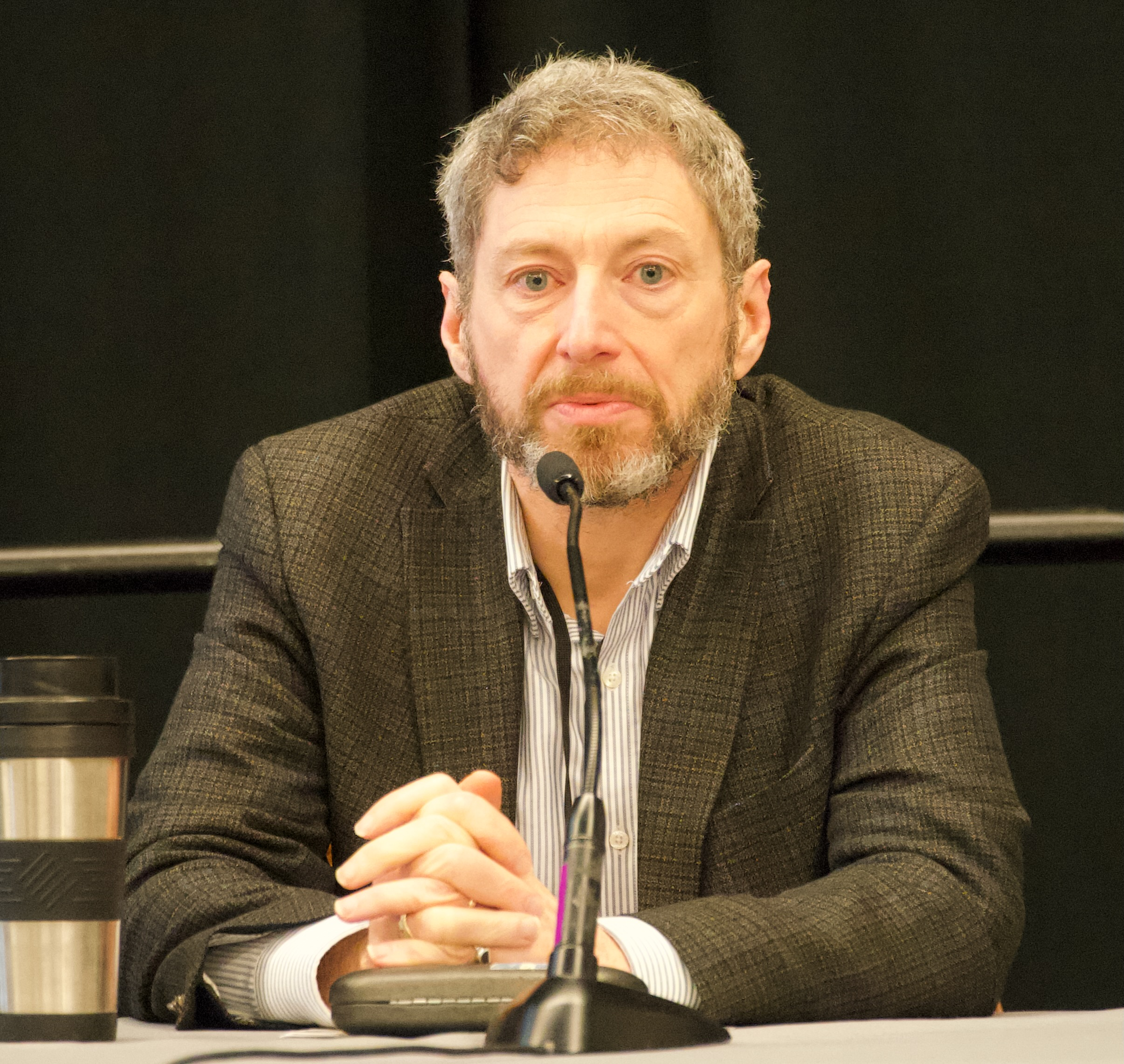
- Occupations: Economist, professor, university administrator

Academic background
- Education: Princeton University (BA); Massachusetts Institute of Technology (PhD)

Benjamin E. Hermalin is an American economist and university administrator. He holds professorships in the economics department at the University of California, Berkeley, and in Berkeley's Haas School of Business, where he is the Thomas & Alison Schneider Distinguished Professor of Finance. Since 2022, he has been Berkeley's executive vice chancellor and provost. In this role, Hermalin made the controversial recommendation to suspend a computer science lecturer over pro-Palestinian comments.

== Early life and education ==
Hermalin grew up in Ann Arbor, Michigan, where his father was a professor of sociology and demography, and his mother was a fundraiser at the University of Michigan. He attended public schools in Ann Arbor before matriculating at Princeton University, where he majored in economics and was a member of Phi Beta Kappa, graduating summa cum laude with a B.A. in 1984. He continued his studies in economics as a doctoral candidate at the Massachusetts Institute of Technology, first as an NSF Graduate Research Fellow and then as a Sloan Foundation Fellow, receiving a Ph.D. in 1988.

== Career ==
In 1988, Hermalin joined Berkeley's Department of Economics and the Haas School of Business faculty. During his tenure at Berkeley, he has been a visiting scholar, professor, and research fellow at several other institutions, including the Federal Reserve Bank of San Francisco, Yale University, the Massachusetts Institute of Technology, Cornell University, and the University of Oxford (Nuffield College). Since 1998, he has been Professor of Economics at Berkeley and, since 2006, he has been the Thomas & Alison Schneider Distinguished Professor of Finance at Berkeley Haas. The National Science Foundation and the Gordon and Betty Moore Foundation have sponsored his research and scholarship.

Hermalin has served on the editorial boards of the American Economic Review and the Journal of Economic Literature, and, from 2010 through 2015, he was co-editor of the RAND Journal. He has been the National Bureau of Economic Research director since 2014.

=== Berkeley Administration ===
Hermalin's role as an administrator at Berkeley began in the mid-1990s, and, in 1999, he was appointed Associate Dean of Academic Affairs & Chair of the Faculty at the Haas School, serving for three years. In 2002, he was interim dean at Haas, and, from 2005 through 2008, he chaired Berkeley's economics department.

From 2009 to 2012, Hermalin served on the university's budget committee and the academic senate from 2014 through 2016. He was Berkeley's Vice Provost for the Faculty from 2016 until 2022, when he was appointed Executive Vice Chancellor and Provost.

In 2025, Hermalin drew controversy on campus for his recommendation to temporarily suspend computer science lecturer Peyrin Kao for his pro-Palestinian "political advocacy" inside and outside of the classroom, including his 38-day hunger strike. Immediately, the decision led to a grievance filed by the UC-AFT union for Berkeley lecturers, several events and actions planned by the student group STEM4Palestine, and widespread demands for reinstatement by many activists and community members. Of Hermalin's choice, UC-AFT grievance steward Ian Davis stated: "Suspending and firing teachers who say things people don’t agree with is not intellectual diversity and violates the rights of those teaching."
