= Peyrin Kao =

Lecturer and activist

- Occupation: Lecturer
- Years active: 2022–present
- Employer: University of California, Berkeley
- Known for: Hunger strike

Peyrin Kao is an American computer science lecturer at the University of California, Berkeley and an activist. He became publicly known in 2025 for a 38-day hunger strike in support of Palestines in Gaza, and for his subsequent suspension by the university over what administrators characterised as political advocacy in the classroom.

== Education and career ==
Kao completed his undergraduate studies at the University of California, Berkeley, receiving a BA in computer science and a BA in data science in 2021, followed by an MS in electrical engineering and computer science in 2022. His master's work was in computer science education, supervised by Nicholas Weaver and Dan Garcia.

As an undergraduate and graduate student he worked as a teaching assistant for several Berkeley computer science courses. He joined the Department of Electrical Engineering and Computer Sciences as a lecturer in 2022. By late 2025 he had been teaching at Berkeley for eight years in total and had held a full-time lectureship for three.

Kao has taught the department's data structures, computer security, internet and networking, and introduction to artificial intelligence courses, often as a co-instructor. In April 2025 he was told he would teach data structures in the autumn rather than the internet and networking course he had been scheduled for, after that course was withdrawn from the semester's offerings; the change came alongside the non-reappointment of a fellow lecturer and prompted a student petition.

As a lecturer, Kao did not hold a tenure-track position, and lecturers at the university are subject to different disciplinary procedures from tenure-track faculty. His contract is set to expire in 2028.

== Activism ==
In November 2023, Kao gave a 25-minute lecture and subsequently facilitated discussion on Israel's bombing of the Gaza Strip at the end of his computer science class. Kao posted the lecture and discussion to YouTube, which garnered much attention. He then had to meet with administrators over possible "disciplinary actions."

On August 27, 2025, the first day of classes at Berkeley, Kao announced a hunger strike which lasted 38 days, until early October. During it, he continued to teach courses while subsisting on a diet of 250 calories per day, resembling the average food portion accessible to Palestinians in Northern Gaza according to a 2024 Oxfam report. He also called for "the university to issue a statement declaring that Israel is conducting a genocide in Gaza, divest from the military, and change its ethical standards for collaborations and partnerships." After ending the hunger strike due to risk of permanent damage to his body, he continued to raise funds for individuals in Gaza.

In September 2025, Kao's name was listed among the 160 students and staff whom Berkeley identified to the federal government for an alleged antisemitism investigation. Kao called the action unsurprising but nonetheless consequential as a chilling effect on freedom of speech.

=== Suspension ===
In December 2025, UC Berkeley suspended Kao without pay for the spring 2026 semester, effective 1 January 2026. Executive Vice Chancellor and Provost Benjamin Hermalin recommended the action after finding that Kao had breached Regents Policy 2301, which bars instructors from using course time for political activity or for purposes unrelated to the course. Hermalin wrote that although the remarks came after class had ended, students could not have been expected to leave in time, since "they could not teleport themselves out" of a large lecture hall. He also concluded that the physical toll of the hunger strike, and Kao's reference to it in class, amounted to a nonverbal form of advocacy. The department and division chairs adopted the recommendation, which set the suspension at a minimum of one semester and provided for additional monitoring of Kao's teaching should he return.

Kao denied wrongdoing and said he had been careful not to violate university rules. In an interview he said the university's commitment to free speech contained an exception for speech on Palestine. As a California state employee, Kao was entitled to a Skelly hearing, and the review of the proposed discipline was conducted by Eric Meyer, dean of the UC Berkeley School of Information.

The suspension drew criticism from faculty groups, unions and students. The student group STEM4Palestine declared a hunger strike beginning on December 10. They also launched an open letter calling for Kao’s reinstatement and denouncing his suspension as a violation of academic freedom.The UC Berkeley Faculty Association wrote to Chancellor Rich Lyons and Hermalin that the decision "threatens the faculty's fundamental political freedoms as citizens". On 15 December 2025 the Middle East Studies Association's Committee on Academic Freedom wrote to the university, arguing that the findings against Kao were doubtful on examination of the policy and that the action breached principles of academic freedom. Writing in Inside Higher Ed, one commentator argued that Kao's remarks fell outside class time and so were not covered by the policy at all.

Other commentators defended the university's position, arguing that Kao had used the classroom for material unrelated to the course he was employed to teach. The Berkeley Division of the Academic Senate separately began drafting recommendations on faculty involvement in discipline and on protections for classroom speech. As of February 2026 the grievance remained unresolved.
