= Hacienda League =

High school athletics league in California, USA

The Hacienda League is a high school athletic league that is part of the CIF Southern Section. Member schools are located in the eastern San Gabriel Valley. Rowland High School, Diamond Bar High School and Bonita High School left the league after the 2013–14 school year, and Chino High School joined from the Palomares League.

== Schools ==
- Covina High School
- Los Altos High School
- South Hills High School
- Diamond Bar High School
- Walnut High School
- Chino High School
