= Dong Kim =

Neurologist

Dong Kim (neurosurgeon)
- Occupation: Neurosurgeon

Dong H. Kim is a professor in the Vivian L. Smith Department of Neurosurgery at The McGovern Medical School at The University of Texas Health Science Center at Houston. Kim is also the former chair of the department, which he led froom 2007 to 2021.

Kim is known for his role in the surgery and recovery of Representative Gabby Giffords. After attending college at Stanford University, he attended medical school at the University of California, San Francisco (UCSF) Medical School. He underwent training in general surgery at Harvard University, followed by an internship at Harvard University. He completed his residency at UCSF and went on to a fellowship at the University of Florida. He is board certified by the American Board of Neurological Surgery and a member of The Society of Neurological Surgeons.

Kim joined the Mischer Neuroscience Institute in October 2007, where he served as Director until 2021. He has also held faculty and hospital appointments at Harvard Medical School, Brigham and Women's Hospital, the Dana-Farber Cancer Institute, Cornell University Medical College, The New York Hospital and Memorial Sloan Kettering Cancer Center.

Kim's specialties and areas of interest include brain aneurysm, brain tumor, pineal gland cyst, meningioma, trigeminal neuralgia and chiari malformation. His interest in aneurysms stems from his own family history. Three of Kim's four grandparents died of brain hemorrhages.

Kim has been recognized by America's Top Surgeons, Marquis Who's Who and Who's Who in America. He is the recipient of grants from the National Institutes of Health and the American Stroke Association. Kim has authored studies in journals including Nature Genetics, Brain Research, International Journal of Cancer, Neurology, Neurosurgery, Journal of Neurosurgery and Genes, Chrom, Cancer.

== Selected bibliography ==
- Kim DH, Van Ginhoven G, Milewicz DM. Familial aggregation of both aortic and cerebral aneurysms: evidence for a common genetic basis in a subset of families. J Neurosurg 56:655-661, 2005.
- Pannu H*, Kim DH*, King T, Guo D, Shete S, Van Ginhoven G, Chin T, Chang K, Oi Y, Milewicz DM (*Authors contribution equal). Association of MMP2 and MMP9 polymorphisms with intracranial aneurysms. J Neurosurg. 105(3):418-23, 2006.
- Krishna V, Kim DH: Ethnic Differences in Risk Factors for Subarachnoid Hemorrhage. J Neurosurg. 107(3):522-529, 2007.
- Avidan N, Tran-Fadulu VT, Chen JH, Yu RK, Mathew S, Pannu H, Guo DC, Yuan J, Stankiewicz P, Yatsenko SA, Ahn C, Braverman AC, Willing MC; Abuelo D, Kim DH, Shete S, Milewicz DM. A Novel Locus for Familial Thoracic Aortic Aneurysms and Dissection Mapped to 15q24-26 (TAAD3): Locus Specific Phenotypes for Familial Aortic Disease. Circulation. In press.
- Guo DC, Pannu H, Tran-Fadulu VT, Papke C, Yu RK, Avidan N, Divecha D, Scherer S, Estrera A, Safi H, Vick III GW, McConnell V, Marian AJ, Kim DH, Tung PP, Buja LM, Rama CS, Shete S, Milewicz DM. Mutations in genes encoding smooth muscle contractile proteins, ACTA2 and MYH11, cause hyperplastic vasculomyopathy and lead to diffuse and diverse vascular diseases. Nature Genetics. 39:1488-1493, 2007.
- Santiago-Sim, T, Depalma, SR, Ju, KL, McDonough, B, Seidman, CE, Seidman, JG, Kim DH: Genomewide linkage in a large Caucasian family maps a new locus for intracranial aneurysms to chromosome 13q. Stroke. 40[suppl 1] S57-S60, 2009.
- Santiago T, Mathew S, Pannu H, Milewicz DM, Seidman CE, Seidman J, Kim DH: Sequencing of TGF-beta pathway genes in familial dases of intracranial aneurysm (submitted). Stroke. 40:1604-1611, 2009.
- Guo DC, Papke CL, Tran-Fadulu V, Regalado ES, Avidan N, Johnson RJ, Kim DH, Pannu H, Willing MC, Sparks E, Pyeritz RE, Singh MN, Dalman RL, Grotta JC, Marian AJ, Boerwinkle EA, Frazier LQ, LeMaire SA, Coselli JS, Estrere AL, Safi HJ, Veeraraghavan S, Munzy DM, Wheeler, DA, Willerson JT. Mutations in smooth muscle alpha-actin (ACTA2) cause coronary artery disease, stroke, and Moyamoya disease, along with thoracic aortic disease. Am J. Hum Genet. 84(5):617-617, 2009. Epub 2009 Apr 30.
- Tran-Fadulu V, Pannu H, Kim DH, Vick GW 3rd, Lonsford CM, Lafont AL, Boccaladro C, Smart S, Peterson KL, Hain JZ, Willing MC, Coselli JS, LeMaire SA, Ahn C, Byers PH, Milewicz DM: Analysis of multigenerational families with thoracic aortic aneurysms and dissections due to TGFBR1 or TGFBR2 mutations. J Med Genet. 46(9):607-613, 2009. Epub 2009 Jun 18.
- Xiaoxin Cheng, Yaping Wang, Qian He, Yiyan Zheng, Dong Kim, Scott Whittemore, and Qilin Cao: Astrocytes from the contused spinal cord inhibit oligodendrocyte differentiation of adult OPCs by increasing the expression of bone morphogenetic proteins. J Neuroscience in press.
