= Brian Stewart (American football) =

American football coach (born 1964)

Middle Tennessee Blue Raiders
- Title: Defensive coordinator

Personal information
- Born: December 4, 1964 (age 61); San Diego, California, U.S.

Career information
- High school: Nogales (CA)
- College: Northern Arizona

Career history
- Cal Poly (1993) Wide receivers coach; Cal Poly (1994) Running backs coach; Northern Arizona (1995) Tight ends coach & special teams coach; Missouri (1996) Graduate assistant; San Jose State (1997–1998) Defensive backs coach; Missouri (1999–2000) Defensive backs coach; Syracuse (2001) Defensive backs coach; Houston Texans (2002–2003) Assistant defensive backs coach; San Diego Chargers (2004–2006) Defensive backs coach; Dallas Cowboys (2007–2008) Defensive coordinator; Philadelphia Eagles (2009) Defensive assistant; Houston (2010–2011) Defensive coordinator; Maryland (2012–2014) Defensive coordinator; Nebraska (2015–2016) Defensive backs coach; Rice (2017) Defensive coordinator & cornerbacks coach; Detroit Lions (2018–2019) Defensive backs coach; Baylor (2020) Cornerbacks coach; Maryland (2021) Defensive coordinator; Houston Roughnecks (2023) Defensive coordinator; Middle Tennessee (2024–present) Defensive coordinator
- Coaching profile at Pro Football Reference

Brian Stewart (born December 4, 1964) is an American football coach who is the defensive coordinator for Middle Tennessee. He was previously the defensive backs coach at Baylor University and defensive coordinator at Rice University for the 2017 season.

== Early life ==
Stewart attended Nogales High School. He accepted a football scholarship from Northern Arizona University. He transferred to Santa Monica City College after his freshman season, when he was ruled academically ineligible. He played both at cornerback and free safety.

He transferred for his junior season back to Northern Arizona University. He played cornerback for the 1986 and 1987 teams.

== Coaching career ==
=== Cal Poly ===
Stewart began his collegiate career as an offensive assistant at Cal Poly-San Luis Obispo, working with the wide receivers in 1993 and the running backs in 1994, when the school won the American West Conference title.

=== Northern Arizona ===
In 1995, he coached tight ends and special teams at Northern Arizona University.

=== Missouri ===
In 1996, he was a defensive graduate assistant at the University of Missouri.

=== San Jose State ===
From 1997 to 1998, he was the secondary coach at San Jose State University.

=== Missouri (second stint) ===
From 1999 to 2000, he was the secondary coach at the University of Missouri.

=== Syracuse ===
In 2001, he was the defensive backs coach at Syracuse University under head coach Paul Pasqualoni, contributing to a 10–3 record and the No. 14 ranking in final Associated Press poll.

=== Houston Texans ===
In 2002, he began his NFL career as the assistant defensive backs coach with the expansion Houston Texans.

=== San Diego Chargers ===
In 2004, he was hired as the secondary coach with the San Diego Chargers under defensive coordinator Wade Phillips.

=== Dallas Cowboys ===
In 2007, when Phillips became the head coach of the Dallas Cowboys, he named Stewart as the defensive coordinator.

=== Philadelphia Eagles ===
In 2009, he was hired as the defensive special assistant with the Philadelphia Eagles.

=== Houston ===
Stewart held the position of defensive coordinator on the Houston Cougars football team from 2010 to 2011 at the University of Houston.

=== Maryland ===
In 2012, Stewart was hired as the defensive coordinator at the University of Maryland. Stewart's defense was second-ranked in yards per game in the Atlantic Coast Conference and the 21st in the nation.

=== Nebraska ===
Stewart was the defensive backs coach at the University of Nebraska–Lincoln from 2015 to 2016.

=== Rice ===
In 2017, he was the defensive coordinator and interim head coach at Rice University.

=== Detroit Lions ===
On February 7, 2018, Stewart was hired by the Detroit Lions as their defensive backs coach of the Detroit Lions under defensive coordinator Paul Pasqualoni and head coach Matt Patricia.

=== Baylor Bears ===
In 2020, Stewart was hired as the cornerbacks coach at Baylor University under head coach Dave Aranda.

=== Maryland (second stint) ===
On February 16, 2021, Stewart returned and was hired as the defensive coordinator at the University of Maryland under head coach Mike Locksley, replacing Jon Hoke, who departed to become the secondary coach for the Atlanta Falcons. He left the staff following the season.

=== XFL ===
In June 2022, It was announced Stewart would become the XFL's Houston Roughnecks Defensive Coordinator.

=== Middle Tennessee ===
On December 11, 2023, Stewart announced he was the new defensive coordinator for Middle Tennessee.

== Personal life ==
Stewart's family includes wife Kimberly and their children Leila, Mya, and Zara. He currently resides in Chandler, Arizona.
