= Donald W. Evans Jr. =

United States Army Medal of Honor recipient

Donald Ward Evans Jr.
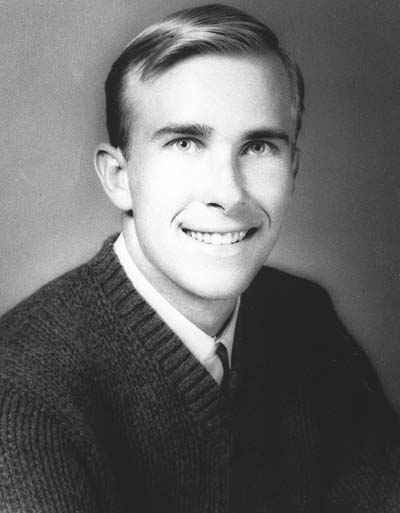
- Specialist Four Donald Evans
- Born: July 23, 1943; Covina, California, US
- Died: January 27, 1967 (aged 23); Tri Tam, Republic of Vietnam
- Military career
- Allegiance: United States
- Branch: United States Army
- Service years: 1965–1967
- Rank: Specialist Four
- Units: Company A, 2nd Battalion, 12th Infantry Regiment, 4th Infantry Division
- Conflicts: Vietnam War †
- Awards: Medal of Honor; Purple Heart

Donald Ward Evans Jr. (July 23, 1943 – January 27, 1967) was a United States Army soldier and a recipient of the United States military's highest decoration—the Medal of Honor—for his actions in the Vietnam War.

== Biography ==
Evans joined the Army from his birth city of Covina, California, in 1965, and by January 27, 1967, was serving as a specialist four combat medic in Company A, 2d Battalion, 12th Infantry Regiment, 4th Infantry Division. During a firefight on that day, in Tri Tam, Republic of Vietnam, Evans repeatedly exposed himself to enemy fire in order to treat and evacuate wounded soldiers, even after being seriously wounded himself. He was killed during the battle and posthumously awarded the Medal of Honor for his actions. He was also awarded the Purple Heart. The United States Army hospital at Fort Carson in Colorado Springs, Colorado, is named in his honor as Evans Army Community Hospital.

== Medal of Honor citation ==
Specialist Evans' official Medal of Honor citation reads:

For conspicuous gallantry and intrepidity in action at the risk of his life above and beyond the call of duty. He left his position of relative safety with his platoon which had not yet been committed to the battle to answer the calls for medical aid from the wounded men of another platoon which was heavily engaged with the enemy force. Dashing across 100 meters of open area through a withering hail of enemy fire and exploding grenades, he administered lifesaving treatment to 1 individual and continued to expose himself to the deadly enemy fire as he moved to treat each of the other wounded men and to offer them encouragement. Realizing that the wounds of 1 man required immediate attention, Sp4 Evans dragged the injured soldier back across the dangerous fire-swept area, to a secure position from which he could be further evacuated. Miraculously escaping the enemy fusillade, Sp4 Evans returned to the forward location. As he continued the treatment of the wounded, he was struck by fragments from an enemy grenade. Despite his serious and painful injury he succeeded in evacuating another wounded comrade, rejoined his platoon as it was committed to battle and was soon treating other wounded soldiers. As he evacuated another wounded man across the fire covered field, he was severely wounded. Continuing to refuse medical attention and ignoring advice to remain behind, he managed with his waning strength to move yet another wounded comrade across the dangerous open area to safety. Disregarding his painful wounds and seriously weakened from profuse bleeding, he continued his lifesaving medical aid and was killed while treating another wounded comrade. Sp4 Evan's extraordinary valor, dedication and indomitable spirit saved the lives of several of his fellow soldiers, served as an inspiration to the men of his company, were instrumental in the success of their mission, and reflect great credit upon himself and the Armed Forces of his country.

== See also ==
- List of Medal of Honor recipients for the Vietnam War
