= West Covina, California =

City in California, United States

- City
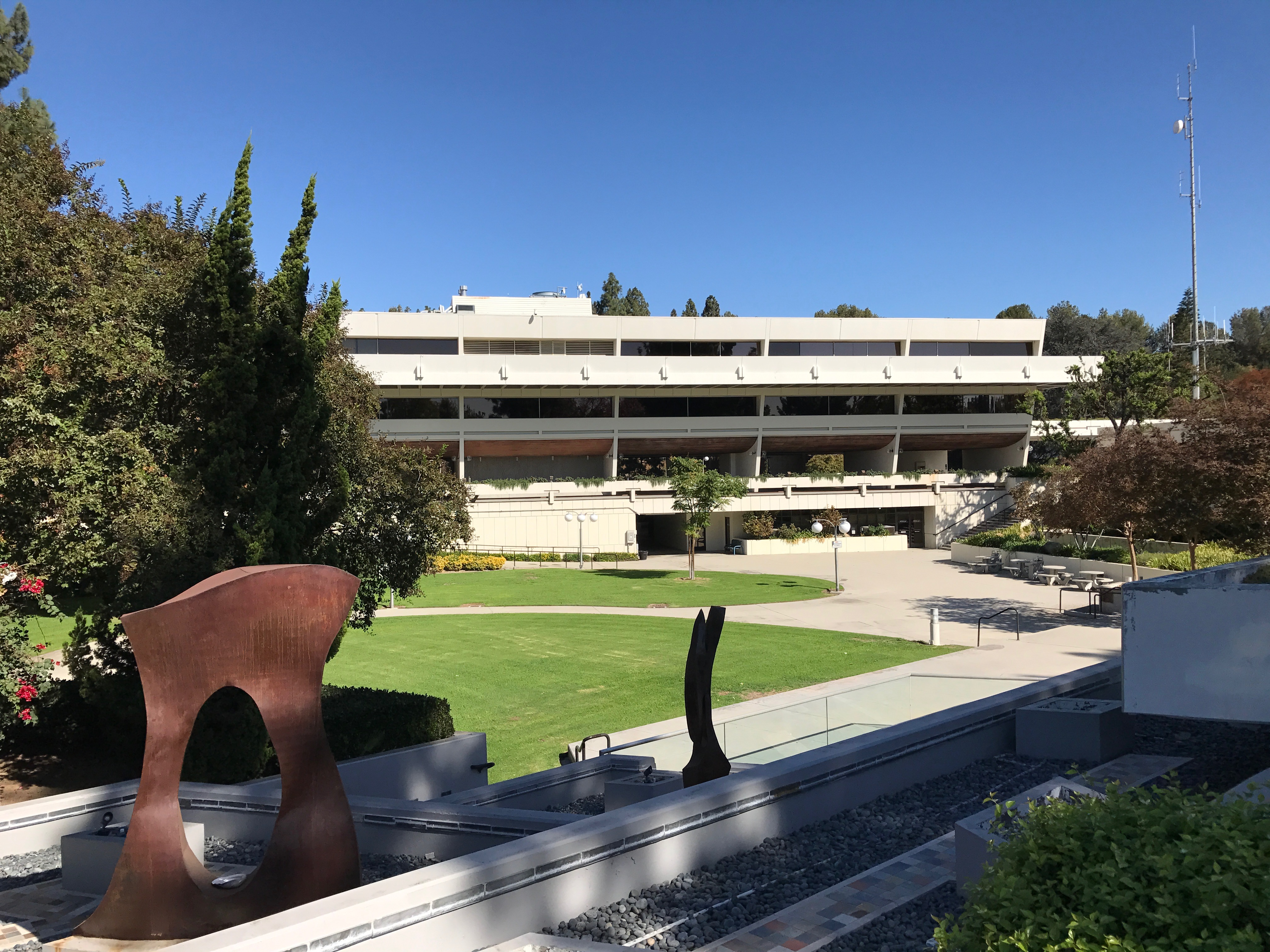
- West Covina City Hall at the Civic Center

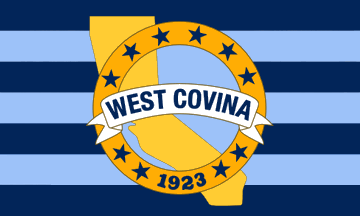
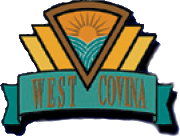
- Flag Seal
- Motto: "Live, Work, Play."
- Location in Los Angeles County, California
- Coordinates: 34°03′24″N 117°55′07″W
- Country: United States
- State: California
- County: Los Angeles
- Incorporated: February 17, 1923

Government
  - Type: Council-Manager
  - Mayor: Letty Lopez-Viado
  - Mayor Pro Tem: Ollie Cantos
  - Councilmember: Tony Wu
  - Councilmember: Rosario Diaz
  - Councilmember: Brian Gutierrez

Area
  - Total: 16.09 sq mi (41.66 km^{2})
  - Land: 16.04 sq mi (41.54 km^{2})
  - Water: 0.046 sq mi (0.12 km^{2}) 0.30%
- Elevation: 384 ft (117 m)

Population (2020)
  - Total: 109,501
  - Rank: 11th in Los Angeles County; 65th in California
  - Density: 6,827/sq mi (2,636/km^{2})
- Time zone: UTC−8 (PST)
  - Summer (DST): UTC−7 (PDT)
- ZIP codes: 91790–91793
- Area codes: 626, 909
- FIPS code: 06-84200
- GNIS feature IDs: 1652809, 2412219
- Website: westcovina.gov

West Covina is a city in Los Angeles County, California, United States. Located 19 miles (31 km) east of downtown Los Angeles in the central San Gabriel Valley, it is part of Greater Los Angeles. The population for the city was 109,501 at the 2020 census.

West Covina is bordered by Covina to the northeast, Baldwin Park and Irwindale to the northwest, La Puente and Valinda to the southwest, Industry to the south, Walnut Islands to the east, and Walnut to the southeast.

== History ==
The Tongva were the earliest inhabitants of the San Gabriel Valley. Governor Pío Pico sold much of the land of West Covina to John Rowland and William Workman in 1845.

The first permanent settlers arrived in West Covina in 1905. Most famous among them were William Payne, Bob Dancer, Bender, Robinson and Larsen. They cleared the land of sagebrush and cactus. They also planted the first walnut trees in the area.

West Covina was incorporated as an independent city in 1923 to prevent the city of Covina from building a sewage farm in the area. Benjamin Franklin Maxson Jr. (1897–1928) initiated the incorporation process and served as the founding mayor. The population in 1930 was 769 and grew to 1,549 in 1940. As a result of remarkable expansion during the post–World War II building boom, West Covina became one of the fastest-growing U.S. cities between 1950 and 1960, experiencing a growth in population of 1,025.69%, going from fewer than 5,000 to more than 50,000 citizens. The decades 1960 and 2000 demonstrated steady growth for West Covina, which had slowed significantly by the time of the 2010 census.

A 2020 ranking of the fiscal health of California cities issued by State Auditor Elaine Howle's office placed West Covina as the ninth-worst in the state. The city was also audited by the state the same year, as the state auditor had determined that the city's poor finances put it at high risk for default.

The world's largest collection of shoehorns is housed in the Shoehorn Museum in West Covina. The state of California's largest hazardous waste landfill is also in the city. The California Department of Toxic Substances Control currently estimates clean up of the landfill will cost nearly $1 billion.

== Geography ==
=== Climate ===
The San Gabriel Valley region has a hot-summer Mediterranean climate, with summer temperatures averaging above 23 °C (73 °F).

== Demographics ==
Historical population
Census	Pop.	Note	%±
1930	769		—
1940	1,072		39.4%
1950	4,499		319.7%
1960	50,645		1,025.7%
1970	68,034		34.3%
1980	80,292		18.0%
1990	96,086		19.7%
2000	105,080		9.4%
2010	106,098		1.0%
2020	109,501		3.2%
U.S. Decennial Census; 1860–1870 1880–1890; 1900 1910 1920; 1930 1940 1950; 1960 1970 1980; 1990 2000 2010; 2020

West Covina first appeared as a city in the 1930 U.S. Census.

West Covina city, California – Racial and ethnic composition Note: the US Census treats Hispanic/Latino as an ethnic category. This table excludes Latinos from the racial categories and assigns them to a separate category. Hispanics/Latinos may be of any race.
Race / Ethnicity (NH = Non-Hispanic)	Pop 1980	Pop 1990	Pop 2000	Pop 2010	Pop 2020	% 1980	% 1990	% 2000	% 2010	% 2020
White alone (NH)	52,640	38,831	24,124	16,196	11,793	65.56%	40.41%	22.96%	15.27%	10.77%
Black or African American alone (NH)	4,401	7,763	6,314	4,260	3,713	5.48%	8.08%	6.01%	4.02%	3.39%
Native American or Alaska Native alone (NH)	533	343	304	232	217	0.66%	0.36%	0.29%	0.22%	0.20%
Asian alone (NH)	5,525	15,675	23,543	26,834	33,097	6.88%	16.31%	22.40%	25.29%	30.23%
Native Hawaiian or Pacific Islander alone (NH)	5,525	15,675	172	142	149	6.88%	16.31%	0.16%	0.13%	0.14%
Other Race alone (NH)	228	221	196	188	541	0.28%	0.23%	0.19%	0.18%	0.49%
Mixed race or Multiracial (NH)	x	x	2,376	1,775	1,889	x	x	2.26%	1.67%	1.73%
Hispanic or Latino (any race)	16,964	33,253	48,051	56,471	58,102	21.13%	34.61%	45.73%	53.23%	53.06%
Total	80,291	96,086	105,080	106,098	109,501	100.00%	100.00%	100.00%	100.00%	100.00%

=== 2020 ===
The 2020 United States census reported that West Covina had a population of 109,501. The population density was 6,828.0 inhabitants per square mile (2,636.3/km^{2}). The racial makeup of West Covina was 20.1% White, 3.7% African American, 1.6% Native American, 30.7% Asian, 0.2% Pacific Islander, 25.3% from other races, and 18.4% from two or more races. Hispanic or Latino of any race were 53.1% of the population.

The census reported that 99.5% of the population lived in households, 0.3% lived in non-institutionalized group quarters, and 0.2% were institutionalized.

There were 33,627 households, out of which 35.2% included children under the age of 18, 51.1% were married-couple households, 6.5% were cohabiting couple households, 26.9% had a female householder with no partner present, and 15.5% had a male householder with no partner present. 15.8% of households were one person, and 7.5% were one person aged 65 or older. The average household size was 3.24. There were 26,380 families (78.4% of all households).

The age distribution was 19.7% under the age of 18, 10.1% aged 18 to 24, 27.0% aged 25 to 44, 26.7% aged 45 to 64, and 16.4% who were 65 years of age or older. The median age was 39.4 years. For every 100 females, there were 94.3 males.

There were 34,834 housing units at an average density of 2,172.1 units per square mile (838.7 units/km^{2}), of which 33,627 (96.5%) were occupied. Of these, 59.9% were owner-occupied, and 40.1% were occupied by renters.

In 2023, the US Census Bureau estimated that the median household income was $98,570, and the per capita income was $38,100. About 7.7% of families and 9.7% of the population were below the poverty line.

=== 2010 ===
The 2010 United States Census reported that West Covina had a population of 106,098. The population density was 6,594.3 inhabitants per square mile (2,546.1/km^{2}). The racial makeup of West Covina was 42.8% White (15.3% Non-Hispanic White), 4.5% Black, 1.0% Native American, 25.8% Asian, 0.2% Pacific Islander, 21.3% from other races, and 4.4% from two or more races. Persons of Hispanic or Latino origin were 53.2%.

The Census reported that 105,424 people (99.4% of the population) lived in households, 351 (0.3%) lived in non-institutionalized group quarters, and 323 (0.3%) were institutionalized.

There were 31,596 households, out of which 13,670 (43.3%) had children under the age of 18 living in them, 17,650 (55.9%) were opposite-sex married couples living together, 5,402 (17.1%) had a female householder with no husband present, 2,308 (7.3%) had a male householder with no wife present. There were 1,664 (5.3%) unmarried opposite-sex partnerships, and 202 (0.6%) same-sex married couples or partnerships. 4,795 households (15.2%) were made up of individuals, and 2,164 (6.8%) had someone living alone who was 65 years of age or older. The average household size was 3.34. There were 25,360 families (80.3% of all households); the average family size was 3.68.

The population was spread out, with 26,075 people (24.6%) under the age of 18, 11,326 people (10.7%) aged 18 to 24, 28,860 people (27.2%) aged 25 to 44, 26,974 people (25.4%) aged 45 to 64, and 12,863 people (12.1%) who were 65 years of age or older. The median age was 36.0 years. For every 100 females, there were 93.1 males. For every 100 females age 18 and over, there were 89.7 males.

There were 32,705 housing units at an average density of 2,032.7 units per square mile (784.8 units/km^{2}), of which 20,703 (65.5%) were owner-occupied, and 10,893 (34.5%) were occupied by renters. The homeowner vacancy rate was 1.1%; the rental vacancy rate was 4.8%. 70,474 people (66.4% of the population) lived in owner-occupied housing units and 34,950 people (32.9%) lived in rental housing units.

During 2009–2013, West Covina had a median household income of $67,088, with 10% of the population living below the federal poverty line.

In 2017, there were more than 10,000 Filipino Americans living in West Covina; they make up the majority population in the south side of the city.

West Covina is broken up into five districts.

Most of the foreign-born population in West Covina were born in Mexico 27.3%, Philippines 18.9%, Mainland China 13.7%, Vietnam 9.6% Taiwan 5.5%, El Salvador 3.1%, Hong Kong 2.7%, Guatemala 1.5%, Korea 1.3% and Indonesia 1.2%.

According to the 2000 Census, Mexicans and Filipinos were the most common ancestries in West Covina. Mexico and Philippines were the most common foreign places of birth.

The most common ancestries in West Covina are Irish, German, English, Italian, and French. The most common non-English languages spoken are Spanish and Chinese.

=== Homelessness ===
In 2022, Los Angeles Homeless Services Authority's Greater Los Angeles Homeless Count counted 112 homeless individuals in West Covina.

Homeless population
Year	Pop.	±%
2016	47	—
2017	165	+251.1%
2018	264	+60.0%
2019	147	−44.3%
2020	124	−15.6%
2022	112	−9.7%
Source: Greater Los Angeles Homeless Count; Los Angeles Homeless Services Authority

== Economy ==
The 14-story Eastland Tower, the tallest building in the city and in the San Gabriel Valley. Previously leased by Wells Fargo.

=== Top employers ===
According to the city's 2025 Comprehensive Annual Financial Report, the top employers in the city are:

#	Employer	# of Employees
1	Emanate Health Queen of the Valley	1,613
2	Options for Learning	900
3	Target	441
4	City of West Covina	439
5	Porto's Bakery	417
6	Interspace/Concorde Battery Corporation	245
7	Macy's	238
8	Premier Healthcare Services LLC	192
9	The Home Depot	174
10	BJ's Restaurants	155

=== Retail ===
There are three major shopping centers in West Covina: Plaza West Covina, Eastland Center, and The Heights at West Covina.

==== Plaza West Covina ====
Plaza West Covina is a regional mall that has 185 shops, stores, and restaurants. The mall is two levels and is anchored by Macy's (180,000 sq ft.) to the east, JC Penney (193,963 sq ft.) to the south, Sears (137,820 sq ft.) to the west, Best Buy (45,000 sq ft.) to the north, and the XXI Forever flagship store, also to the north. There is a food court on the second level as well as other restaurants, and food and drink kiosks throughout the mall. The mall is known for its many fashion shops and high-end fashion boutiques.

==== Eastland Center ====
The Eastland Center is a power center which has undergone major renovations since it opened in 1957. Eastland is two levels, with parking for the lower level on south side of the center and parking for the upper level on the north side. It has many department stores and is anchored by Target. (122,000 sq ft (11,300 m^{2})) to the east.

==== The Heights at West Covina ====
The Heights at West Covina is a 340,000-square-foot (32,000 m^{2}) retail shopping center located just south of the Sportsplex. It is anchored by The Home Depot to the north, and Target to the south. The center has many other stores and restaurants.

==== Jollibee ====
Jollibee opened headquarters in West Covina in 2019.

== Parks and recreation ==
=== West Covina Sportsplex ===
The West Covina Sportsplex is a 315-acre (127 ha) commercial and recreational center opened in 2007. Built on a former landfill, the center includes a sports park, commercial development, and public golf course.

== Government ==
In the California State Legislature, West Covina is split between the 22nd senatorial district, represented by Democrat Susan Rubio and the 30th senatorial district, represented by Democrat Bob Archuleta. In the California State Assembly, it is in the 48th Assembly district, represented by Democrat Blanca Rubio. In the United States House of Representatives, West Covina is in California's 31st congressional district, represented by Democrat Gil Cisneros.

== Politics ==
United States presidential election results for West Covina, California
Year	Republican		Democratic		Third party(ies)	
Year	No.	%	No.	%	No.	%
2000	9,324	36.62%	15,313	60.14%	827	3.25%
2004	11,087	42.24%	14,941	56.92%	219	0.83%
2008	13,079	35.91%	22,641	62.17%	698	1.92%
2012	11,310	33.04%	22,136	64.66%	789	2.30%
2016	10,169	28.14%	24,065	66.58%	1,908	5.28%
2020	15,848	33.23%	31,003	65.01%	842	1.77%
2024	16,440	39.77%	23,729	57.41%	1,166	2.82%

== Education ==
=== Primary and secondary schools ===
Public schools in West Covina administered by the Covina-Valley Unified School District include:

- Grovecenter Elementary School
- Mesa Elementary School
- Rowland Avenue Elementary School
- Workman Avenue Elementary School
- Traweek Middle School
- South Hills High School

Public schools in West Covina administered by the Rowland Unified School District include:

- Hollingworth Elementary
- Telesis Academy
- Giano Intermediate

Public schools in West Covina administered by the West Covina Unified School District include:

- California Elementary
- Cameron Elementary
- Merced Elementary
- Merlinda Elementary
- Monte Vista Elementary
- Orangewood Elementary
- Vine Elementary
- Wescove Elementary
- Edgewood Middle School
- Hollencrest Middle School
- Walnut Grove Intermediate
- Coronado High School
- Edgewood High School
- MT. SAC Early College Academy
- West Covina High School

Charter School (Standalone)

- San Jose Charter Academy

== Infrastructure ==
=== Transportation ===
Foothill Transit, based in West Covina, provides service connecting the city to the rest of the San Gabriel Valley. The Silver Streak bus rapid transit services West Covina at four stops: West Covina City Hall, Plaza West Covina, Vincent Avenue/Lakes Drive, and Interstate 10/Azusa Avenue. The city operates the Go West shuttle between Cortez Park in the central part of the city and Valley Boulevard on the southern part and microtransit serving the northern half of the city.

=== Healthcare ===
Emanate Health Queen of the Valley Hospital in West Covina offers the following services: emergency room, surgery, maternity care, pediatrics, neurology, and diagnostic imaging.

== Notable people ==
- Former Major League Baseball pitcher Dan Haren grew up in West Covina, California.
- Major League Baseball pitcher Rick Aguilera, a three-time All-Star who played in two World Series, attended Edgewood High School in West Covina.
- National Football League quarterback and broadcaster Troy Aikman was born at Queen of the Valley Hospital in West Covina, but moved to Oklahoma as a child.
- Drag queen Jackie Beat.
- Major League Baseball outfielder and coach Tom Brunansky attended West Covina High School.
- Actor Robert Buckley was born in West Covina.
- Jeff Cox attended South Hills High School. He has been a Major League Baseball player and coach.
- Electronic dance music producer and DJ Deorro currently resides in West Covina.
- Major League Baseball pitcher Joey Eischen was born in West Covina and graduated from West Covina High School and is from the Class of 1988.
- Baseball pitcher Carlos Fisher was born in West Covina. He pitched for the Cincinnati Reds.
- Major League Baseball outfielder Jeremy Giambi attended South Hills High School.
- Major League Baseball first baseman Jason Giambi was born in West Covina and attended South Hills High School.
- Chinese Basketball Association basketball player Jonathan Gibson was born in West Covina.
- Rock star Joan Jett, although born in Pennsylvania, moved with her family to West Covina when she was 15.
- Major League Baseball outfielder Jay Johnstone, although born in Connecticut, graduated Edgewood High School in 1960.
- Mystery novelist Lee Charles Kelley lived in West Covina from age 4 to 15.
- Major League Baseball infielder Mike Lamb was born in West Covina.
- Major League Baseball pitcher Cory Lidle attended South Hills High School. He was killed in a plane crash in 2006.
- Major League Baseball pitcher Jim Merritt attended Edgewood High School.
- Actress Nia Peeples was raised in West Covina; she attended and graduated from West Covina High School, class of 1980, and was also Homecoming Queen.
- World record-breaking long jumper Mike Powell attended Edgewood High School.
- Major League Baseball pitcher Jo-Jo Reyes was born in West Covina. He has pitched for numerous teams.
- Actor and director Tim Robbins was born in West Covina. His films include The Shawshank Redemption, Mystic River, Bull Durham and Dead Man Walking.
- Major League Baseball outfielder Gary Roenicke attended Edgewood High School.
- Major League Baseball pitcher and manager Ron Roenicke attended Edgewood High School.
- Major League Baseball pitcher Aaron Small attended South Hills High School. He pitched for seven MLB teams.
- Brian Stewart defensive backs coach at the University of Nebraska, lived in West Covina from 1976 to 1982.
- Major League Baseball pitcher and executive Bill Stoneman attended West Covina High School.
- Chicano rapper Mr. Capone-E was born in Pakistan but he and his family moved to West Covina at an early age.
- Mexican-American singer Larry Hernández lives in West Covina.
- Gabe York (born 1993), basketball player for Hapoel Tel Aviv of the Israeli Basketball Premier League
- Professional tennis player Ernesto Escobedo resides in West Covina.
- Television personality Scheana Shay was born in West Covina.
- Songwriter Greg Camp was born in West Covina.
- Artist Keith Parkinson was born in West Covina.
- Swedish progressive rock musician and songwriter Nad Sylvan was born in West Covina.
- Filipino-American basketball player Dwight Ramos was born in West Covina.
- Trent Perry, UCLA basketball player
- Ty France, baseball player for the San Diego Padres

== In popular culture ==
West Covina and the San Gabriel Valley are the setting for the US television series Crazy Ex-Girlfriend.

The 1997 Nickelodeon film Good Burger was mostly filmed in West Covina.

The USS West Covina was a Federation California-class starship operated by Starfleet in the late 24th century featured in Star Trek: Lower Decks.

== Sister cities ==
West Covina's sister cities are:

- Fengtai (Beijing), China
- Ōtawara, Japan
- Tainan, Taiwan

== See also ==
- List of cities in Los Angeles County, California
- List of cities and towns in California
