= Nogales High School (La Puente, California) =

Location
- 401 Nogales St. La Puente, California 91744; United States; 34°00′36″N 117°53′20″W

Information
- School type: Public high school
- Established: 1961
- School district: RUSD
- Principal: Scott Cavanias
- Teaching staff: 75.49 (FTE)
- Grades: 9–12
- Enrollment: 1,608 (2023–2024)
- Student to teacher ratio: 21.30
- Campus type: Suburban
- Colors: Green, white, and black
- Athletics conference: CIF Southern Section; Montview League
- Mascot: Noble
- Rival: Rowland High School
- Newspaper: Nogales Noble Times
- Website: www.nogaleshs.org

Nogales High School is a public high school located in South San Jose Hills, California. Founded in 1961, the campus serves as one of the 3 high schools in the Rowland Unified School District.

== Nogales Nobles ==
- Cecil Fielder, MLB player, New York Yankees
- Alvin Youngblood Hart, guitarist, singer, songwriter
- Roger Hernandez, California State assemblyman
- Tom House, MLB pitcher, Seattle Mariners
- Darryll Lewis, NFL cornerback, Jim Thorpe Award-winner
- Regina Zernay Roberts, musician
- Kevin Devine, NFL cornerback, Jacksonville Jaguars
- Nadya Suleman, media personality, mother of octuplets
- Brian Stewart (born 1964), American football coach, defensive coordinator
