= Northview High School (California) =

Coordinates: 34.094101°N 117.910836°W

Location
- 1016 West Cypress Avenue; Covina, California 91722; United States

Information
- Type: Public secondary
- Established: 1959
- School district: Covina-Valley Unified School District
- Principal: Dr. Leo Magallon
- Teaching staff: 53.65 (FTE)
- Grades: 9–12
- Enrollment: 1,264 (2023-2024)
- Student to teacher ratio: 23.56
- Colors: Black and gold
- Athletics conference: CIF Southern Section; Valle Vista League
- Mascot: Viking
- Information: Phone: (626) 974-6120; Fax: (626) 974-6145
- Website: Northview High School

Northview High School is one of three comprehensive high schools within the Covina-Valley Unified School District, California, United States. Established in 1959, the school is located on 43 acres (170,000 m^{2}) of land that is landscaped with trees, shrubs, and grass. Northview High School serves the cities of Covina and Irwindale.

== Notable alumni/faculty ==
- Lacey Baker - professional skateboarder
- Rick Baker - Oscar-winning Hollywood make-up artist, class of 1968
- Mark Clear (born 1956) - major league baseball two-time All Star relief pitcher
- Tatiana Suarez - professional Mixed Martial Artist, current UFC Strawweight
- Chris Woodward - Former Major League Baseball player, and manager of the Texas Rangers from 2019–2022.
- Thomas Granger - Former, UFL United Football League Safety Las Vegas Locomotives Former American Sports University Head Football Coach 2010–2013.
- Tim Corcoran - Former Major League Baseball player
- Rob Wilfong - Former MLB player, Minnesota Twins from 1977–1982, California Angels from 1982–1986, San Francisco Giants 1987.
- Keith Lockhart - Former MLB player, San Diego padres 1994 and 2003, Kansas City Royals 1995-1996, Atlanta Braves from 1997-2002
