= Covina, California =

City in California, United States

Covina
- City
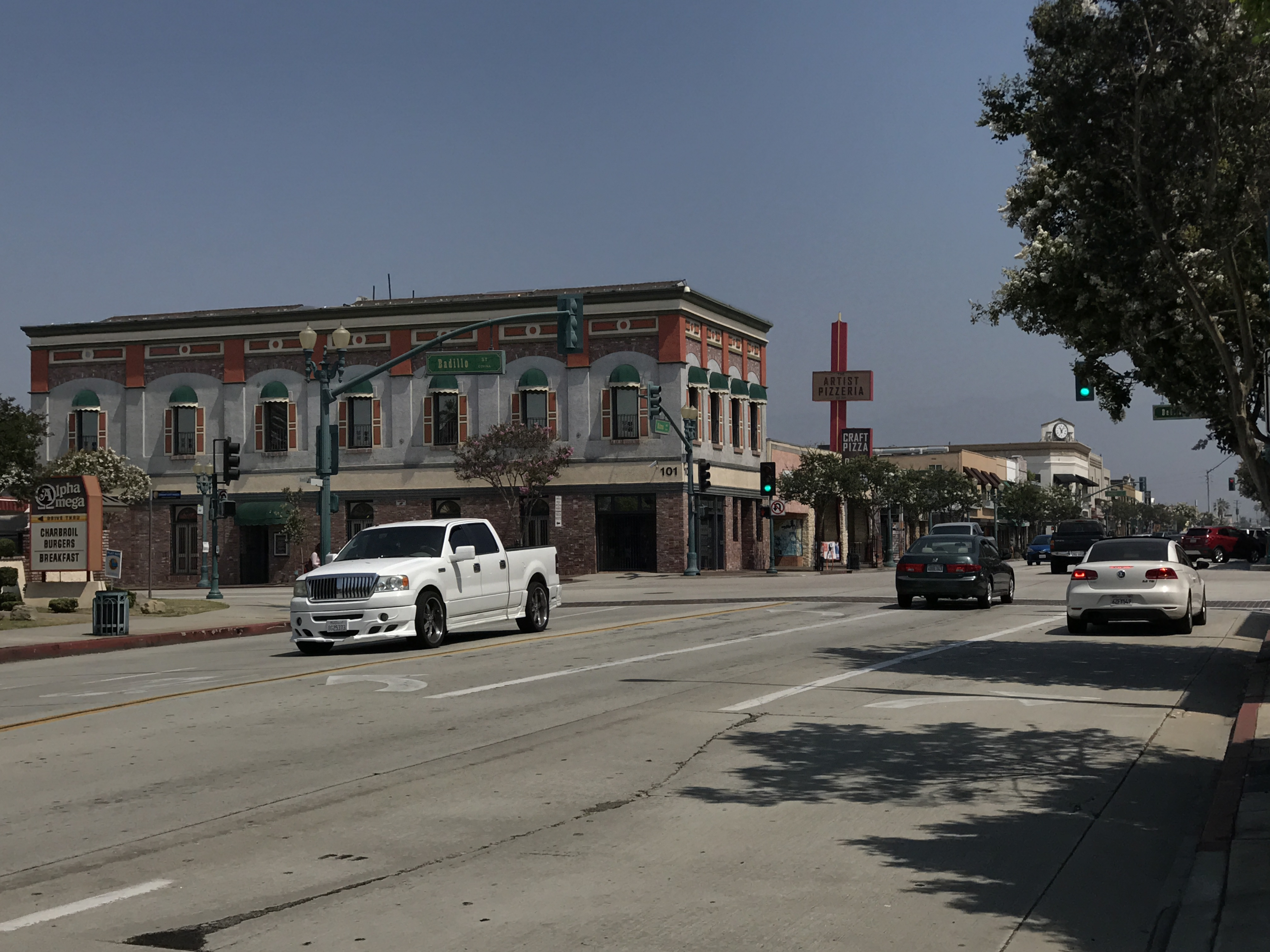
- Downtown Covina

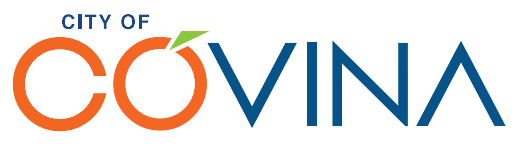
- Seal Logo
- Mottoes: "A Mile Square and All There" (1922), "Where Friendship Is Traditional" (1965)
- Interactive map of Covina
- Coordinates: 34°5′30″N 117°52′45″W
- Country: United States
- State: California
- County: Los Angeles
- Founded: 1884
- Incorporated: August 14, 1901

Government
  - Type: Council-Manager
  - Mayor: Hector Delgado
  - Mayor Pro Tem: Patricia Cortez
  - Councilmember: Walter Allen III; Victor Linares; John C. King
  - City Manager: Chris Marcarello

Area
  - Total: 7.05 sq mi (18.26 km^{2})
  - Land: 7.03 sq mi (18.22 km^{2})
  - Water: 0.012 sq mi (0.03 km^{2}) 0.22%
- Elevation: 560 ft (170 m)

Population (2020)
  - Total: 51,268
  - Density: 7,286.6/sq mi (2,813.39/km^{2})
- Demonym: Covinan
- Time zone: UTC−8 (Pacific)
  - Summer (DST): UTC−7 (PDT)
- ZIP Codes: 91722–91724
- Area code: 626
- FIPS code: 06-16742
- GNIS feature IDs: 1652693, 2410251
- Website: Covina, California

Covina (/koʊˈviːnə/) is a city in the San Gabriel Valley region of Los Angeles County, California, United States, about 22 miles (35 km) east of downtown Los Angeles. The population was 51,268 according to the 2020 census, up from 47,796 at the 2010 census.

Covina is bordered by West Covina, to its south and west side. Irwindale lies to the west, as well as the unincorporated area of Vincent, and the city of Baldwin Park. Azusa and Glendora are to the north, the unincorporated community of Charter Oak to the northeast, San Dimas to the east, the unincorporated area of Ramona and city of Pomona to the southeast.

== History ==
Present-day Covina was originally within the homelands of the indigenous Tongva people for 5,000 to 8,000 years. In the 19th century it became part of Rancho La Puente: an 1842 Mexican land grant in Alta California.

In 1876, Costa Rican brothers Pedro and Julián Badilla purchased a 5,563-acre (22.51 km^{2}) tract of land in Rancho La Puente, where Julián and younger brother Antonio intended to establish a coffee plantation. In 1879, after the Badillas defaulted on a mortgage, J. Edward Hollenbeck acquired their tract by foreclosure. In 1881, real estate investor Joseph Swift Phillips entered into an agreement with Hollenbeck to purchase a 2,000-acre (8.1 km^{2}) tract of former Badilla land, where Phillips subsequently founded Covina in 1884. Covina was incorporated in 1901.

Covina was named by Phillips Tract surveyor Fred Eaton who was said to observe the tract's topography and the many vineyards then present on the land and combine the words "cove" and "vine" into the portmanteau "Covina." The name first appeared in print on Eaton's tract map and in newspapers in December, 1884.

Covina's extensive orange and lemon groves of the first half of the 20th century brought prosperity and fame to the city. In 1907, Covina claimed to be the third-largest shipping point of oranges in the world. After World War II, however, the citrus groves were increasingly replaced by housing, eventually turning Covina into the suburban bedroom community it is today.

The Covina Valley Historical Society maintains an archive illustrating the city's history in the 1911-built Firehouse Jail Museum, Covina's first municipal building, located immediately behind City Hall in Covina's Old Town.

Opened in 1997, the Covina AMC 30 located at Arrow Highway and Azusa Avenue is one of the busiest theatres in the United States. The movie theater was built on the site of a former Sears building and claims to have the largest movie multiplex in Los Angeles County.

2008 marked both the opening and the charter season of the Covina Center for the Performing Arts, a newly remodeled multimillion-dollar theatrical venue in downtown Covina.

=== 2008 massacre ===
On December 24, 2008, a shooting and arson occurred. Bruce Jeffrey Pardo, dressed in a Santa Claus costume, entered a Christmas party at his ex-wife's residence and opened fire. When he left, nine family members were dead and the house was engulfed in flames. After the massacre, Pardo drove his rental car to his brother's house in Sylmar, approximately 30 miles (48 km) away from the attack. He was later found dead from a self-inflicted gunshot wound. The slayings left 15 children without one or both parents.

== Geography ==
The only freeway that passes through the area is a very small stretch of Interstate 10. Covina is centered in the midst of Interstate 210 (Foothill Freeway) to the north, Interstate 605 (San Gabriel River Freeway) to the west, State Route 57 (Orange Freeway) to the east, and Interstate 10 to the south.

The Southern Pacific Railroad, which reached Covina in 1895, and the Metrolink San Bernardino Line pass through the city just north of the downtown area. The city is served by Covina station.The town is located at the foot of the San Gabriel Mountains in the San Gabriel Valley. According to the United States Census Bureau, the city has a total area of 7.0 square miles (18 km^{2}), of which 99.78% is land and 0.22% is water.

=== Climate ===
This region experiences hot, dry summers and mild, occasionally rainy winters. According to the Köppen climate classification system, Covina has a hot-summer Mediterranean climate, abbreviated "Csa" on climate maps.

Climate data for Covina, California
| Month | Jan | Feb | Mar | Apr | May | Jun | Jul | Aug | Sep | Oct | Nov | Dec | Year |
|---|---|---|---|---|---|---|---|---|---|---|---|---|---|
| Mean daily maximum °F (°C) | 60 (16) | 62 (17) | 70 (21) | 75 (24) | 76 (24) | 80 (27) | 89 (32) | 88 (31) | 87 (31) | 79 (26) | 73 (23) | 70 (21) | 76 (24) |
| Mean daily minimum °F (°C) | 42 (6) | 47 (8) | 50 (10) | 55 (13) | 57 (14) | 64 (18) | 65 (18) | 63 (17) | 63 (17) | 57 (14) | 49 (9) | 44 (7) | 55 (13) |
| Average precipitation inches (mm) | 3.68 (93) | 4.66 (118) | 3.00 (76) | 1.10 (28) | .38 (9.7) | .15 (3.8) | .04 (1.0) | .07 (1.8) | .33 (8.4) | .78 (20) | 1.45 (37) | 2.42 (61) | 18.06 (457.7) |

== Demographics ==
Historical population
| Census | Pop. | Note | %± |
|---|---|---|---|
| 1930 | 2,774 | | — |
| 1940 | 3,049 | | 9.9% |
| 1950 | 3,956 | | 29.7% |
| 1960 | 20,124 | | 408.7% |
| 1970 | 30,395 | | 51.0% |
| 1980 | 32,746 | | 7.7% |
| 1990 | 43,207 | | 31.9% |
| 2000 | 46,837 | | 8.4% |
| 2010 | 47,796 | | 2.0% |
| 2020 | 51,268 | | 7.3% |
U.S. Decennial Census; 1850–1870 1880-1890; 1900 1910 1920; 1930 1940 1950; 1960 1970 1980; 1990 2000 2010

=== Racial and ethnic composition ===
Covina city, California – Racial and ethnic composition Note: the US Census treats Hispanic/Latino as an ethnic category. This table excludes Latinos from the racial categories and assigns them to a separate category. Hispanics/Latinos may be of any race.
| Race / Ethnicity (NH = Non-Hispanic) | Pop 1980 | Pop 1990 | Pop 2000 | Pop 2010 | Pop 2020 | % 1980 | % 1990 | % 2000 | % 2010 | % 2020 |
|---|---|---|---|---|---|---|---|---|---|---|
| White alone (NH) | 27,816 | 27,200 | 19,801 | 14,288 | 10,051 | 82.86% | 62.95% | 42.28% | 29.89% | 19.60% |
| Black or African American alone (NH) | 444 | 1,641 | 2,245 | 1,806 | 1,748 | 1.32% | 3.80% | 4.79% | 3.78% | 3.41% |
| Native American or Alaska Native alone (NH) | 245 | 153 | 163 | 128 | 156 | 0.73% | 0.35% | 0.35% | 0.27% | 0.30% |
| Asian alone (NH) | 901 | 3,101 | 4,490 | 5,492 | 7,571 | 2.68% | 7.18% | 9.59% | 11.49% | 14.77% |
| Native Hawaiian or Pacific Islander alone (NH) | 901 | 3,101 | 81 | 85 | 87 | 2.68% | 7.18% | 0.17% | 0.18% | 0.17% |
| Other race alone (NH) | 67 | 70 | 88 | 73 | 268 | 0.20% | 0.16% | 0.19% | 0.15% | 0.52% |
| Mixed race or Multiracial (NH) | x | x | 1,098 | 894 | 1,279 | x | x | 2.34% | 1.87% | 2.49% |
| Hispanic or Latino (any race) | 4,278 | 11,042 | 18,871 | 25,030 | 30,108 | 12.74% | 25.56% | 40.29% | 52.37% | 58.73% |
| Total | 33,571 | 43,207 | 46,837 | 47,796 | 51,268 | 100.00% | 100.00% | 100.00% | 100.00% | 100.00% |

=== 2020 census ===
As of the 2020 census, Covina had a population of 51,268. The median age was 38.7 years. 21.0% of residents were under the age of 18 and 14.4% were 65 years of age or older. For every 100 females, there were 92.4 males. For every 100 females age 18 and over, there were 89.9 males age 18 and over.

100.0% of residents lived in urban areas, while 0.0% lived in rural areas.

There were 16,941 households, of which 36.2% had children under the age of 18 living in them. Of all households, 46.9% were married-couple households, 16.4% were households with a male householder and no spouse or partner present, and 29.3% were households with a female householder and no spouse or partner present. About 19.4% of all households were made up of individuals, and 8.3% had someone living alone who was 65 years of age or older.

There were 17,473 housing units, of which 3.0% were vacant. The homeowner vacancy rate was 0.7%, and the rental vacancy rate was 3.0%.

=== 2010 census ===
The 2010 United States census reported that Covina had a population of 47,796. The population density was 6,788.3 inhabitants per square mile (2,621.0/km^{2}). The racial makeup of Covina was

- 27,937 (58.5%) White (29.9% Non-Hispanic White),
- 2,013 (4.2%) African American,
- 532 (1.1%) Native American,
- 5,684 (11.9%) Asian,
- 104 (0.2%) Pacific Islander,
- 9,230 (19.3%) from other races, and
- 2,296 (4.8%) from two or more races.
- 25,030 (52.4%) Hispanic or Latino of any race were.

The Census reported that 47,361 people (99.1% of the population) lived in households, 68 (0.1%) lived in non-institutionalized group quarters, and 367 (0.8%) were institutionalized.

There were 15,855 households, out of which 6,396 (40.3%) had children under the age of 18 living in them, 7,931 (50.0%) were opposite-sex married couples living together, 2,815 (17.8%) had a female householder with no husband present, 1,072 (6.8%) had a male householder with no wife present. There were 978 (6.2%) unmarried opposite-sex partnerships, and 94 (0.6%) same-sex married couples or partnerships. 3,153 households (19.9%) were made up of individuals, and 1,179 (7.4%) had someone living alone who was 65 years of age or older. The average household size was 2.99. There were 11,818 families (74.5% of all households); the average family size was 3.43.

The population was spread out, with 11,896 people (24.9%) under the age of 18, 5,043 people (10.6%) aged 18 to 24, 13,113 people (27.4%) aged 25 to 44, 12,174 people (25.5%) aged 45 to 64, and 5,570 people (11.7%) who were 65 years of age or older. The median age was 35.7 years. For every 100 females, there were 93.3 males. For every 100 females age 18 and over, there were 89.5 males.

There were 16,576 housing units at an average density of 2,354.2 per square mile (909.0/km^{2}), of which 9,256 (58.4%) were owner-occupied, and 6,599 (41.6%) were occupied by renters. The homeowner vacancy rate was 1.1%; the rental vacancy rate was 6.4%. 28,707 people (60.1% of the population) lived in owner-occupied housing units and 18,654 people (39.0%) lived in rental housing units.

According to the 2010 United States census, Covina had a median household income of $66,726, with 11.3% of the population living below the federal poverty line.

An additional 31,072 residents live in zip codes associated with Covina but outside the city limits, making the total Covina-area population 78,868 at the time of the 2010 census.

=== 2000 census ===
As of the census of 2000, there were 46,837 people, 15,971 households, and 11,754 families residing in the city. The population density was 6,723.7 inhabitants per square mile (2,596.0/km^{2}). There were 16,364 housing units at an average density of 2,349.1 per square mile (907.0/km^{2}). The racial makeup of the city was 62.10% White, 5.03% Black or African American, 0.90% Native American, 9.82% Asian, 0.21% Pacific Islander, 17.18% from other races, and 4.78% from two or more races. 40.29% of the population were Hispanic or Latino of any race.

There were 15,971 households, out of which 38.4% had children under the age of 18 living with them, 51.6% were married couples living together, 16.3% had a female householder with no husband present, and 26.4% were non-families. 20.8% of all households were made up of individuals, and 7.7% had someone living alone who was 65 years of age or older. The average household size was 2.89 and the average family size was 3.36.

In the city, the population was spread out, with 28.1% under the age of 18, 9.5% from 18 to 24, 31.1% from 25 to 44, 20.4% from 45 to 64, and 10.9% who were 65 years of age or older. The median age was 34 years. For every 100 females, there were 92.0 males. For every 100 females age 18 and over, there were 87.0 males.

The median income for a household in the city was $48,474, and the median income for a family was $55,111. Males had a median income of $40,687 versus $32,329 for females. The per capita income for the city was $20,231. About 8.9% of families and 11.6% of the population were below the poverty line, including 15.4% of those under age 18 and 6.9% of those age 65 or over.

An additional 30,000 residents live in unincorporated areas of the three zip codes associated with Covina but outside the city limits, making the total Covina-area population 76,417.

Mexican and German were the most common ancestries. Mexico and the Philippines were the most common foreign places of birth.

German, English, Irish, Italian and French are the top ancestries. Spanish and Chinese are the most common non-English languages.

== Economy ==
=== Top employers ===
According to the city's 2023 Annual Comprehensive Financial Report, the top employers in the city are:

| # | Employer | # of Employees |
|---|---|---|
| 1 | Covina Valley Unified School District | 1,351 |
| 2 | Citrus Valley Health Partners-Intercommunity | 926 |
| 3 | Charter Oak Unified School District | 677 |
| 4 | IKEA | 292 |
| 5 | Wal-Mart | 287 |
| 6 | City of Covina | 252 |
| 7 | Howard J. Chudler & Associates, Inc | 232 |
| 8 | The Home Depot | 189 |
| 9 | Bert's Mega Mall | 165 |
| 10 | Healthcare Partners Affiliates Medical Group | 151 |

== Government and infrastructure ==
Local government in Covina is run by an elected city council through their hired city manager. Covina residents are represented at-large, currently by the following elected officials: Mayor Hector Delgado, Mayor Pro Tem Patricia Cortez, Councilmember Walter Allen III, Councilmember John C. King, and Councilmember Victor Linares.

In the California State Legislature, Covina is in the 22nd senatorial district, represented by Democrat Susan Rubio, and in the 48th Assembly district, represented by Democrat Blanca Rubio.

In the United States House of Representatives, Covina is in California's 31st congressional district, represented by Democrat Gil Cisneros.

Covinans who access county health services may use the Pomona Health Center in Pomona or the Monrovia Health Center in Monrovia, both operated by the Los Angeles County Department of Health Services.

== Education ==
Covina is served by three unified school districts. The Covina-Valley Unified School District, which serves most of the city, the Charter Oak Unified School District, which serves the eastern portion and the Azusa Unified School District, which serves a small portion in the northwest.

Covina-Valley USD schools located in Covina include:

- Barranca Elementary School
- Ben Lomond Elementary School
- Cypress Valley Elementary School
- Manzanita Elementary School
- Merwin Elementary School
- Las Palmas Middle School
- Sierra Vista Middle School
- Covina High School
- Northview High School

Charter Oak USD schools located in Covina include:

- Badillo Elementary School
- Cedargrove Elementary School
- Glen Oak Elementary School
- Royal Oak Middle School
- Charter Oak High School

Azusa USD schools located in Covina include:

- Gladstone Middle School

== In popular culture ==
Covina is the fictional setting for the Harold Teen comic strip and 1934 movie that depicted several teenagers from Covina High School. A downtown Covina malt shop was named the Sugar Bowl (with the permission of the artist Carl Eds), imitating the after-school gathering place in the comic strip.

Scenes from several movies and television shows have been filmed in Covina, including:

- The television series Roswell was filmed in various location in Covina including the downtown area on North Citrus Avenue. City Hall, Charter Oak High School and several other businesses and residences served as locations for the fictional version of the town of Roswell, New Mexico.
- Multiple episodes of the hit television series Knight Rider were filmed in Downtown "Old" Covina, including an episode coincidentally shot at Knight's Photo Studio on Citrus, where David Hasselhoff greeted fans and passed out signed photographs.
- One of the ending shots of the movie Frailty was filmed on Center St. off of Hollenbeck.
- During the opening diner scene in Reservoir Dogs, a poster featured in the background shot is of a carnival located on Covina Blvd. and Bonnie Cove Ave.
- The "Bohemian Rhapsody" scene from the film Wayne's World was filmed on Citrus Avenue in downtown Covina, although some external shots were filmed in other locations.
- The "Grey Poupon" scene from Wayne's World was shot on Citrus Avenue. Covina Hobby was visible in the background. Having two cars side-by-side reflects (incorrectly) that the main drag had four lanes.
- The interior of Covina Public Library served as the Baltimore County Public Library for the 2004 television movie Back When We Were Grownups.
- An episode of Tabatha's Salon Takeover was filmed in Downtown "Old" Covina at Tantrum on Citrus Avenue.
- The theater in downtown Covina (refurbished in 2008), the library and neighborhood streets around downtown were used in the filming of High School U.S.A.—a 1983 movie starring Michael J. Fox and Nancy McKeon.

== Notable people ==
- Leo Baker – professional skateboarder, attended Northview High School
- Rick Baker – seven-time Academy Award-winning makeup artist; films include American Werewolf In London, Ed Wood, Men In Black and The Wolfman
- Pamela Baird, child actress, My Friend Flicka, Leave It to Beaver, graduated from Covina High School, class of 1963
- Irma Blanco – L.A. radio personality, resided in Covina
- Tom Brunansky – Major League Baseball player and coach, played from 1985 to 2000 for New York Mets, Minnesota Twins, Boston Red Sox and Chicago Cubs; 1985 All-Star, member of 1987 World Series champion Twins; born in Covina
- Clyde Christensen – offensive coordinator of NFL's Miami Dolphins; born in Covina, attended Royal Oak High School
- Gil Cisneros, U.S. representative; former Under Secretary of Defense for Personnel and Readiness
- Jack Clark – Major League Baseball player for San Francisco Giants, St. Louis Cardinals, New York Yankees, San Diego Padres and Boston Red Sox from 1975 to 1992; hit .267 with 340 home runs, played in 1985 World Series, four-time MLB All-Star; graduated from Gladstone High School in 1973
- Mark Clear – baseball player
- Art Clokey – creator of Gumby; with wife Ruth invented Gumby in the early 1950s at their Covina home after Art finished film school at USC
- Casey Dailey – football player for Northwestern and NFL's New York Jets
- Herschel Daugherty – former film, television and theatre director.
- William "Billie" Raymond DeVrell (1937–1981) – Wonderland Gang member killed in 1981 Wonderland murders is buried at Forest Lawn Memorial-Parks and Mortuaries (Covina Hills)
- Donald W. Evans Jr., Sp4., (1943–1967) – Army medic awarded Medal of Honor for bravery in Vietnam War, plus Purple Heart; born in Covina
- Donna Fargo – country singer, taught English at Northview High School in the 1960s and 1970s
- Hussein Mohamed Farrah – son of Mohamed Farrah Aidid and former President of Somalia, graduated from Covina High School
- Frank Farris – mathematician
- Jason David Frank (1973–2022) – played Tommy Oliver in the Power Rangers franchise
- Rod Gilfry – opera baritone
- Roy Harris – composer, grew up on strawberry farm in Covina and attended Covina High School
- Lillian Kinkella Keil – decorated World War II flight nurse; born in Covina
- Ward Kimball – one of original Disney animators, leader of Dixieland band Firehouse Five Plus Two; Covina High School class of 1929
- Robert Knapp – actor, lived in Covina in his teenage years and worked in orange groves
- Bob Lorenz – anchor and studio host, New York Yankees TV network (YES Network); previously with CNN, CNNSI and Turner Sports
- Mike Lynn – former NBA player for Los Angeles Lakers
- Jeremy Miller – actor in TV comedy series Growing Pains; born and raised in Covina
- John Molina Jr. – boxer, born in Covina
- Mike Morrell – politician
- Corey Nakatani – jockey, winner of nearly 4,000 races; born and raised in Covina
- Vince Neil and Tommy Lee of Mötley Crüe – met while attending Royal Oak High School
- Kelly Nichols – former pornographic film actress
- Aaron Perez – Soccer player
- PattiSue Plumer – Athlete in 1980 and 1988 Olympics
- Polly Plumer – American track and field runner
- Alice Huyler Ramsey – died in Covina; first woman to drive across America from coast to coast. On June 9, 1909, the 22-year-old housewife and mother from Hackensack, New Jersey, completed 3,800 miles (6,100 km) from Manhattan, New York, to San Francisco, California, in a Maxwell automobile; she was accompanied on the 59-day trek by three female companions, none of whom could drive a car.
- Mitrice Richardson – dancer
- Jeron Roberts (born 1976) - American-Israeli basketball player
- Gary Roenicke – Major League Baseball outfielder for Montreal Expos (1976), Baltimore Orioles (1978–85), New York Yankees (1986) and Atlanta Braves (1987–88), hit .247 with 121 home runs; born in Covina
- Ron Roenicke – Major League Baseball player and manager, coach of 2002 World Series champion Anaheim Angels; born in Covina
- Bobby Rose – Major League Baseball and Nippon Professional Baseball player; born in Covina
- Rio Ruiz – baseball third baseman
- Gaius Shaver – football player
- Willie Shoemaker (1931–2003) – Hall of Fame jockey with 8,833 wins including four Kentucky Derbys; attended Covina High School
- Jean Stafford – Pulitzer Prize-winning novelist and short-story writer
- Tatiana Suarez – mixed martial artist
- Rob Wilfong – Major League Baseball player for Minnesota Twins, California Angels and San Francisco Giants from 1977 to 1987, batted .248 with 39 home runs; graduated from Northview HS in 1971
- Chris Woodward – Major League Baseball player (1999–2010) for Toronto Blue Jays, New York Mets, Atlanta Braves, Boston Red Sox, and Seattle Mariners; born in Covina and attended Northview HS
- Ellen Beach Yaw (known as Lark Ellen) – a coloratura soprano active during the 19th and 20th centuries, who toured the world singing opera for over 40 years and chose to retire in Covina; a street in city is named for her
- Jennifer York – award-winning Los Angeles traffic reporter and bassist; born in Covina
- Michael Young – Major League Baseball infielder, 7-time All-Star selection with Texas Rangers (2004–2009, 2011), 2005 American League batting champion, 2006 MLB All-Star Game MVP, 2008 Gold Glove Award winner; born in Covina

== Sister city ==
Covina has one sister city:

- Xalapa, Mexico

== See also ==
- List of cities and towns in California
- List of cities in Los Angeles County, California
