= Valle Vista League =

High school athletic league in California

The Valle Vista League is a high school athletic league that is part of the CIF Southern Section. Members are located in east San Gabriel Valley region of Los Angeles County.

== Members ==
- Baldwin Park High School
- Alta loma High School
- Diamond Ranch High School
- West Covina High School
- Northview High School (Covina, California)
- San Dimas High School
