= Chinese American enclaves in the San Gabriel Valley =

San Gabriel Valley
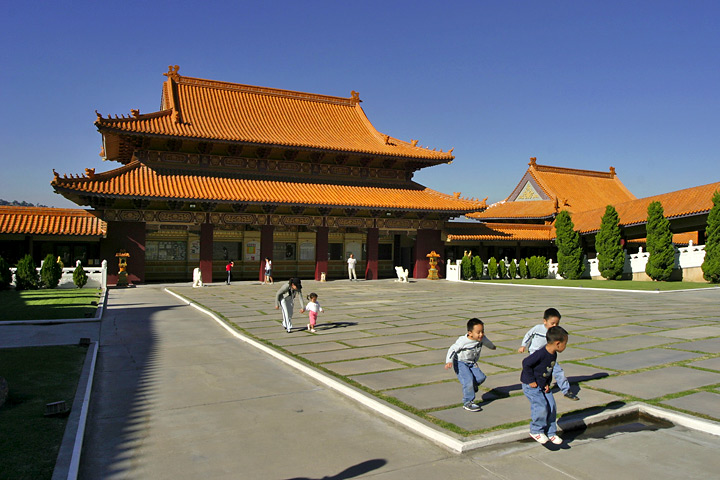
- Hsi Lai Temple in Hacienda Heights, the second-largest Buddhist temple and monastery in the Western Hemisphere.
- Simplified Chinese: 圣盖博谷
- Traditional Chinese: 聖蓋博谷
Transcriptions
Standard Mandarin
- Hanyu Pinyin: Shèng Gàibó Gǔ
Yue: Cantonese
- Yale Romanization: Sing Goibok Gūk
- Jyutping: sing3 koi3 bok3 guk1
Southern Min
- Hokkien POJ: Sèng Kài-phok Kok

Alternative Chinese name
- Simplified Chinese: 圣加布里埃尔谷
- Traditional Chinese: 聖加布里埃爾谷
Transcriptions
Standard Mandarin
- Hanyu Pinyin: Shèng Jiābùlǐāi'ěr Gǔ
Yue: Cantonese
- Yale Romanization: Sing Gābouléihāaiyíh Gūk
- Jyutping: sing3 gaa1 bou3 lei5 aai1 ji5 guk1
Southern Min
- Hokkien POJ: Sèng Ka-pò͘-lí-ai-ní Kok

Second alternative Chinese name
- Simplified Chinese: 圣加百利谷
- Traditional Chinese: 聖加百利谷
Transcriptions
Standard Mandarin
- Hanyu Pinyin: Shèng Jiābǎilì Gǔ
Yue: Cantonese
- Yale Romanization: Sing Gābaakleih Gūk
- Jyutping: sing3 gaa1 baak3 lei6 guk1
Southern Min
- Hokkien POJ: Sèng Ka-pah-lāi Kok

The Asian-American influx into the southwestern portion of the San Gabriel Valley region of Los Angeles County, California, grew rapidly when Chinese immigrants began settling in Monterey Park in the 1970s. Located just east of the city of Los Angeles, the region has achieved international prominence as a hub of overseas Chinese, or hua qiao. Although Chinese immigrants were a noteworthy presence in the establishment of Southern California from the 19th century, significant Chinese migration to suburban San Gabriel Valley coincided with a trend of white out-migration from the 1970s onward. This opened an opportunity for middle-class Asian Americans to begin settling in the San Gabriel Valley.

High property values, crime, and overcrowding in Monterey Park have contributed to a secondary movement away from that city, and the Chinese community is now spread over a cluster of cities in the San Gabriel Valley. Suburban cities in the valley besides Monterey Park with large Chinese populations, also called ethnoburbs, include Alhambra, Arcadia, Rosemead, San Marino, San Gabriel, South Pasadena, and Temple City and then eastward to Chino Hills, Diamond Bar, the City of Industry, Hacienda Heights, Rowland Heights, Walnut, and West Covina. Numerous Mandarin, Hokkien, Hakka, Teochew, Shanghainese, and Cantonese speaking businesses have been established in these suburbs to accommodate the changing population.

== History ==
The history of the San Gabriel Valley, like much of the American West, included Chinese, Japanese, Filipino, and south Asian settlers and pioneers in the mid-19th century. These Asian settlers worked the fields of grapes, citrus fruits, and other crops. They were also involved in the construction of early infrastructure for San Gabriel Valley. Due to the 1882 Chinese Exclusion Act, the 1942 internment of Japanese, and racial covenant laws, Asian economic and social assimilation were halted for many years. The only Asian cultural hubs were Chinatown and Little Tokyo in Downtown Los Angeles, though populations persisted elsewhere.

In 1961, Alfred Song became the first Asian American elected to the California State Assembly, representing Monterey Park. Since the passage of the 1965 Immigration Act, there has been an influx of some 20 million Asian immigrants to the United States, many of whom settled in Monterey Park due to its close proximity to Chinatown, suburban appeal, and "superior public education" to LAUSD. This continued through the 1970s with the arrival of ethnic Chinese refugees from Vietnam, affluent waisheng ren Taiwanese, and Mainland Chinese.

While these San Gabriel neighborhoods contain prominent Chinese-language signage, these communities do not feature the Chinese-style gateways, or paifang, found in the original Chinatown. In 1988, Monterey Park passed an ordinance declaring a moratorium on new buildings, in an attempt to regulate the rapid growth the city experienced as a result of the influx of Asian immigrants. This moratorium was challenged and defeated in 1989, but it caused many Asian residents and businesses to move to the neighboring city of Alhambra, later spreading eastward to more communities.

By 1996, the population of Monterey Park was 65% Asian, primarily Chinese. Given the San Gabriel Valley's rapidly increasing population of Asian-Americans (largely Chinese-Americans), several business districts were developed to serve their needs. By 2000, many Chinatown residents and businesses had moved to the San Gabriel Valley. The creation of this major hub, which is a cultural center with many suburban cities, is an "Asian Pacific American phenomenon". Rather than solely being a significant Chinese American cultural center, the area is a hub of much more extensive "multigenerational and multiethnic Asian American diversity." In the 21st century, many of the ethnoburbs in the San Gabriel Valley have expanded and thrived, and are becoming increasingly diverse – as well as congested.

=== 2023 Monterey Park mass shooting ===
On January 21, 2023, a mass shooting occurred in Monterey Park, California, United States. The gunman killed eleven people and injured nine others. The shooting happened at about 10:22 p.m. PST (UTC-8) at Star Ballroom Dance Studio, after an all-day Lunar New Year Festival was held on a nearby street. Shortly afterwards, the gunman drove north to Lai Lai Ballroom in nearby Alhambra to continue his shooting spree but was confronted by then 26-year-old Brandon Tsay and disarmed before fleeing by car. The perpetrator was identified as 72-year-old Huu Can Tran. He died from a self-inflicted gunshot wound during a standoff with police in Torrance the next day. It is the deadliest mass shooting in the history of Los Angeles County.

== Communities ==
Hong Kong Plaza in Rowland Heights, California

There are several suburban Chinese-oriented ethnoburbs in Southern California, including those in the San Gabriel Valley. Unlike the official Chinatown in downtown Los Angeles, these "pocket" communities are not called "Chinatown" by the Chinese community there, but generally by the name of the city. Monterey Park has been called the "First Suburban Chinatown" due to it not being located in the downtown of a large city.

The Asian communities in the San Gabriel Valley follow along a 25-mile (40 km) stretch of Valley Boulevard, covering the entire length of the valley, with Alhambra on the west side and Diamond Bar on the east side. Asian communities in the valley extend as far north as San Marino and Arcadia and as far south as Hacienda Heights and Rowland Heights.

San Gabriel has become a brand-name destination for Chinese tourists, especially in the business district around the San Gabriel Mall. This tourism boom is bringing about the construction of additional hotels as many Chinese tourists prefer to rent rooms in San Gabriel, even if they plan to visit typical Southern California tourist destinations.

The first generation of Chinese Americans in the area identify with 626 — the area code of much of the San Gabriel Valley. They are fluent in English but still identify with the culture of their parents. Many feel that something new has been created, such as songs mixing bits of dialect from across China with American hip-hop. The popularity of Boba, chewy tapioca pearls served in a drink of sweet tea, is a cultural touchstone of "626." Popular food festival 626 Night Market in Arcadia, California, was also named after the area code as a "mecca for the Chinese food-obsessed."

=== Monterey Park ===
From the 1970s on, Taiwanese immigrants began settling in Monterey Park and the nearby communities of Alhambra, and Rosemead. The area was not too far from the Los Angeles Chinatown commercial area and was becoming a Chinese-influenced community. This trend included affluent Chinese professionals, mostly from Taiwan. At that time, Monterey Park was being marketed by realtors in Taiwan and Hong Kong as the "Chinese Beverly Hills," to entice future investors. The crowded downtown L.A. Chinatown did not have room for the growing numbers of Chinese leaving Taiwan and Hong Kong for economic opportunities in America. Other Mandarin Chinese-speaking immigrants of the middle and working classes, from Taiwan and mainland China, later followed. Settlement in the city picked up the pace in the 1980s, following opportunities created by the white flight from the San Gabriel Valley. Chinese shopping centers—with supermarkets serving as anchors—were developed to serve the new residents. As this unique phenomenon became known, Monterey Park was described as the "first suburban Chinatown" in North America, and was featured in Forbes magazine, Time magazine, Los Angeles Times, and The Atlantic Monthly. Monterey Park's effect on tourism in Los Angeles was featured on the "Life and Times" show on the L.A. former-PBS affiliate KCET.

Monterey Park, California

Little Taipei (Chinese: 小臺北) was an informal name given to the city of Monterey Park, California, in the late 1970s because of the large immigrant population from Taiwan. (Taipei is the capital city of Taiwan.) The city council had tried, and failed, to pass English-only sign ordinances, because of safety issues for police and fire departments. In 1985, the City Council of Monterey Park approved drafting of a proposal that would require all businesses in Monterey Park to display English language identification on business signs. According to the Monterey Park Chamber of Commerce, within the city's 7.7-square-mile (20 km^{2}) limits, there are more than 60 Chinese restaurants, more than 50 realty companies, several Chinese supermarkets, scores of dental, medical, accounting and legal offices, and dozens of shopping centers.

The Chinese American population in Monterey Park and San Gabriel Valley is relatively diverse in socioeconomics and region of origin, including overseas Chinese from Vietnam and Indonesia. In Monterey Park, 61.3 percent of the population is Asian American, In Alhambra, Arcadia, and San Gabriel, the Asian population was 48.91 percent, as of the 2000 census. Montebello is also included as it has had a significant (almost 25%) Asian population for several decades after seceding from Monterey Park.

=== San Gabriel ===
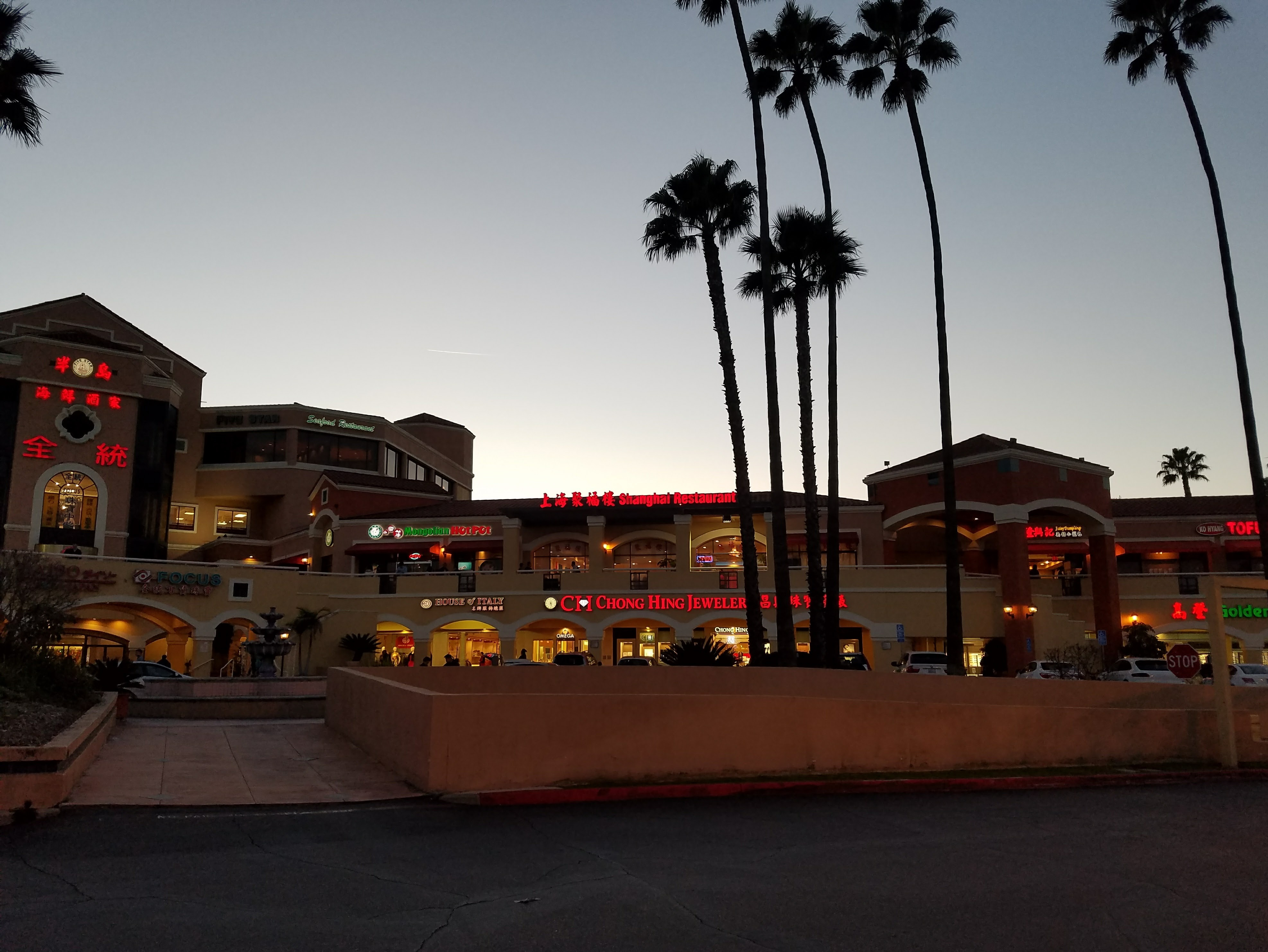
San Gabriel Square

The city of San Gabriel boasts a mixture of Asian, European, and North American cultures. Second- and third-generation Chinese Americans patronize its stores and eateries. There is the 12-acre (49,000 m^{2}) "San Gabriel Square" mall that has been mentioned in the Los Angeles Times as "the great mall of China." This stretch of Chinese shops and architecture, with roofs of Spanish-style tile, is the model for the new ethnoburbs recently recognized in areas like the Las Vegas Valley and Houston. The conglomeration of restaurants and cafes, shops, markets, hair and nail salons, Asian video stores, health services, department stores, plus an extensive jewelry mart, caters to the needs of customers.

=== Alhambra ===
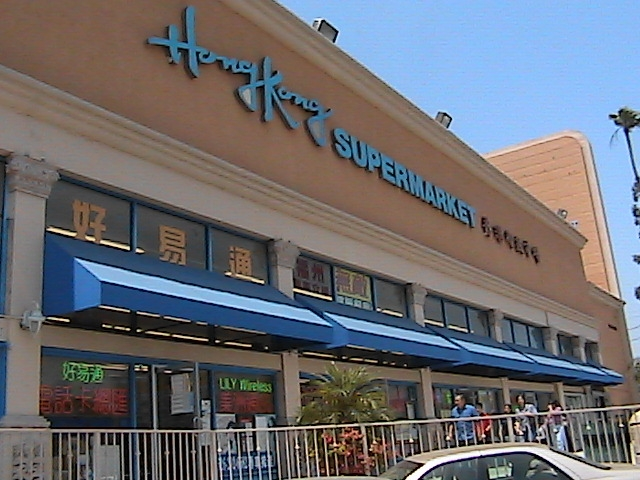
An Asian supermarket in San Gabriel Valley.

In 1992, the city of Alhambra and its southern neighbor Monterey Park jointly held the first annual Chinese new year parade and street festival. There were several conflicts and controversies with Monterey Park, so in the next few years the city of Alhambra has held the parade with its neighbor San Gabriel. The parade and festival have corporate sponsors, and several Chinese-dominant cities in San Gabriel Valley also sponsor the parade. This parade is broadcast on LA Chinese-language radio and on TV. Chi Mui became the city's first Chinese American mayor in 2006. The new San Gabriel Chinese aggregation served as the setting for the thriller novel The Jasmine Trade, authored by Denise Hamilton.

=== Rowland Heights ===
Chinese businesses were formerly more spread out in Rowland Heights, an unincorporated area with a Chinese retail corridor on Colima Road and Nogales Street and intermixed with a Korean community. Taiwanese and mainland Chinese, with number of ethnic Chinese from South Korea, and Vietnam, immigrant businesses, namely the eateries, banks, and offices, are gradually occupying the various strip malls across the Puente Hills Mall and in Hacienda Heights and City of Industry. The population is now 55 percent Asian.

Rowland Heights remains the Chinese commercial/cultural center in East San Gabriel Valley.

=== Hacienda Heights ===
Nearby, in Hacienda Heights, Hsi Lai Temple, a Buddhist temple, was built in 1988. Though the proposed development was opposed at the time by some local residents, it is now a respected and accepted part of the community, with members of the United States House of Representatives and the Los Angeles County Sheriff's Department often visiting during major events. The Hsi Lai Temple is the largest Buddhist temple in the Western Hemisphere.

In addition to Rowland Heights and Hacienda Heights, Eastern San Gabriel Valley areas with a high percentage of Asian residents are West Covina, Walnut, and Diamond Bar.

=== Temple City ===
According to the 2020 United States census, 64.1% of residents in Temple City identify as Asian. That proportion has expanded significantly from the 2000 census, where the racial makeup of the city was reported to be 38.89% Asian.

Along Las Tunas Boulevard, the "Bridal District" of Asian businesses along the stretch of the downtown area has made Temple City a bride's "mecca" for all wedding needs including elaborate dresses, as Asian brides often wear three gowns. Also included are several florists and lavish portrait studios supporting the Asian tradition of taking studio quality photos of the bride and groom before the wedding. Asian brides come from as far away as New York City to visit this Temple City specialty sector.

=== Valley Boulevard Corridor ===
Valley Boulevard (former US 60, US 70, and US 99) is a vital and growing professional and business sector that includes many Asian markets, eateries and other service-oriented businesses such as physicians and dentists. There are multiple Asian banks and Asian owned and operated enterprises that accommodate the burgeoning Asian population.

The Asian communities in the San Gabriel Valley follow along a 25-mile (40 km) stretch of Valley Boulevard covering the entire length of the San Gabriel Valley with Alhambra on the west side and Diamond Bar on the east side. Asian communities in the San Gabriel Valley extend as far north as San Marino and Arcadia and as far south as Hacienda Heights and Rowland Heights.

Valley Boulevard begins at Lincoln Park, off North Main Street near downtown Los Angeles, about a mile northeast of the downtown Los Angeles Chinatown. From North Main Street, Valley runs east along a five-mile (8 km) stretch including large industrial tracts and the largely Hispanic community of Lincoln Heights. Midway between downtown Chinatown to the west and the start of the ethnic Chinese suburbs to the east is the Ming Ya Buddhist Foundation, on Valley Boulevard in Lincoln Heights.

From Los Angeles, Valley Boulevard enters Alhambra, the "Gateway to the San Gabriel Valley". Alhambra, which is 47% Asian according to the 2000 census, has a large number of Asian businesses along Valley Boulevard. Alhambra's Valley Boulevard boasts numerous noodle shops, Asian cafés and the original Sam Woo Barbecue restaurant. The artful Wing Lung Bank features the largest glass tile mural in North America, composed of 996,000 3/4" glass tiles. Each year, Alhambra and San Gabriel host one of the largest Lunar Chinese New Year celebrations in the country which includes a parade along Valley Boulevard.

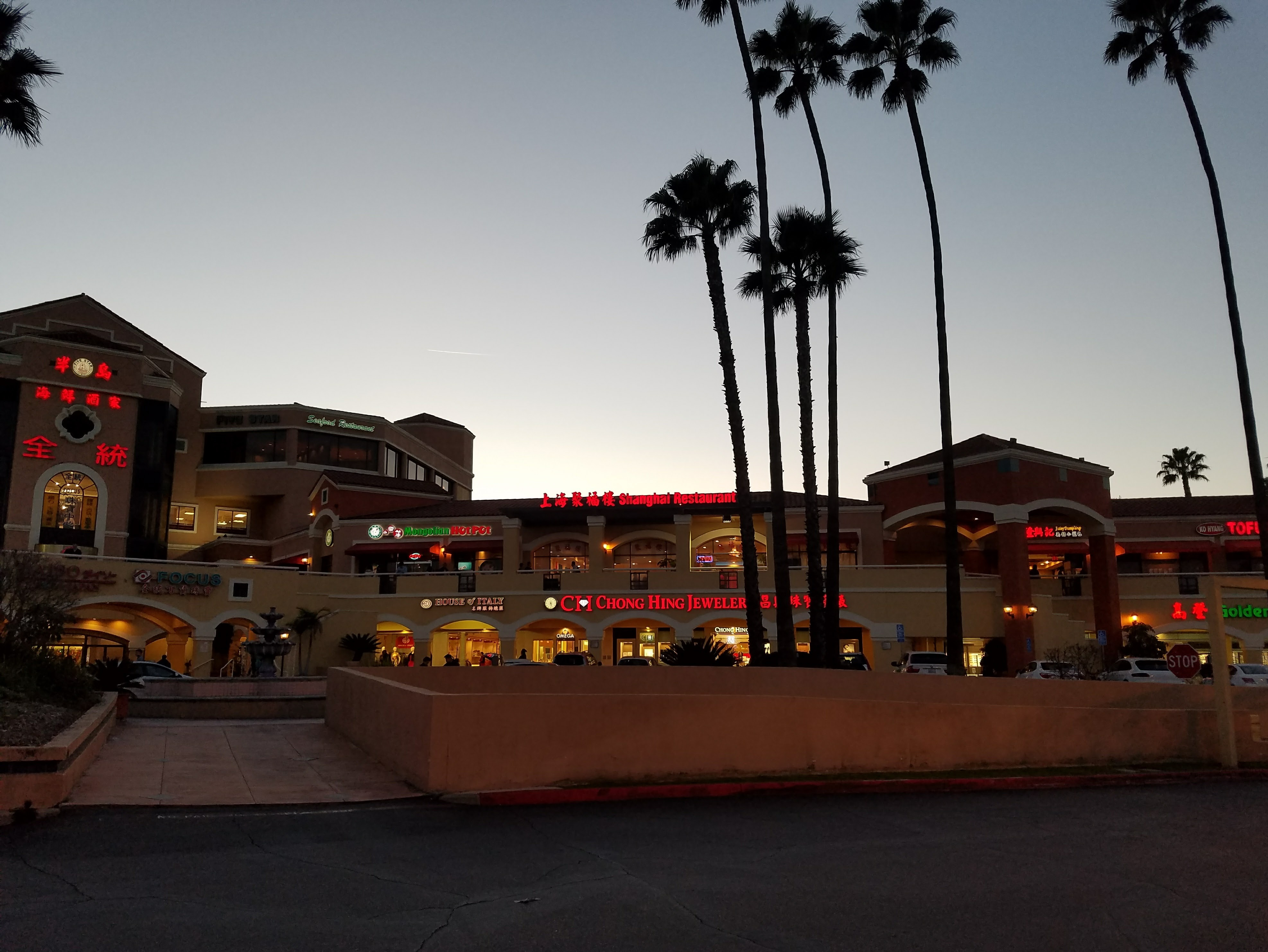
San Gabriel Square

Continuing east from Alhambra along Valley Boulevard are the cities of San Gabriel and Rosemead with San Marino, Temple City and Arcadia being further north and east. These five cities have Asian populations between 40 and 55% with a large number of Asian businesses in their various town centers. Along Valley Boulevard in San Gabriel are dozens of Asian mini-malls and hundreds of shops and restaurants. San Gabriel Square is one of the most prominent and features a 99 Ranch Market, several shops and restaurants including specialties such as Taiwanese and Vegetarian food. Valley Boulevard in San Gabriel also includes the comprehensive San Gabriel Superstore which includes multiple vendors anchored by a large grocery store.

Continuing east from Rosemead further along Valley are the largely Hispanic communities of El Monte and La Puente and large industrial tracts, including those that dominate the City of Industry. This ten-mile-long (16 km), largely industrial corridor includes many Asian owned wholesale businesses, including importers of electronics, food and furniture from Asia. North of La Puente is West Covina which is 26% Asian and south of La Puente is Hacienda Heights which is 36% Asian Hacienda Heights is home to the Hsi Lai Temple, the largest Buddhist temple in the United States. The temple encompasses 15 acres (61,000 m^{2}) and a floor area of 102,432 sq ft (9,516.2 m^{2}). The temple's Ming Dynasty (1368–1644 AD) and Qing Dynasty (1644–1911 AD) architecture is faithful to the traditional style of buildings, Chinese gardens, and statuary of ancient Chinese monasteries. Hsi Lai was built to serve as a spiritual and cultural center for those interested in learning Buddhism and Chinese culture.

On the east side of the San Gabriel Valley, before Valley Boulevard becomes Holt Avenue in Pomona, are the communities of Rowland Heights, Walnut and Diamond Bar. These three communities each have Asian populations of between 50 and 60%. Rowland Heights offers its own mini ethnic suburbia, including the businesses lining Colima Road (about one mile (1.6 km) south of Valley), Fullerton Road and Nogales Street. Indoor malls in Rowland Heights feature fine restaurants and chic Asian boutiques.

=== L.A. County ===
Asian-American ethnoburbs can be found in the South Bay, Los Angeles, and San Fernando Valley, and may include South Asians. These include Sawtelle (West Los Angeles), San Pedro (due to its proximity to the Port of Los Angeles/Long Beach), and Pasadena, though Pasadena's historic Japantowns are no longer hubs of the Japanese American communities. The towns of Artesia, Cerritos, Gardena, Hawaiian Gardens, La Mirada, Lakewood, Long Beach, Carson, Lomita, Norwalk, Redondo Beach, Torrance, and Whittier have some Asian-American neighborhoods and businesses/malls.

=== Similar enclaves outside L.A. County ===
Experts said they predict more Asian-oriented supermarkets of these types to open in other Inland cities in coming years, including Corona, California, whose Asian population jumped from 8 percent to 11 percent from 2000 to 2005. The same goes for Rancho Cucamonga, whose Asian population rose from 6 percent in 2000 to 8 percent in 2005.

Other Asian ethnoburbs in Southern California are in Orange County, such as Anaheim, Buena Park, Costa Mesa, Garden Grove, Huntington Beach, Irvine, Laguna Beach, Laguna Niguel, La Palma, Orange, and Westminster.

Chinese and Asian-American ethnoburbs also can be found in Chino, Chino Hills, San Bernardino, Calico, a section of Barstow, Fontana, Riverside, Moreno Valley, San Jacinto, Desert Hot Springs north of Palm Springs, Victorville, Loma Linda, and elsewhere (i.e. the San Diego area, Bakersfield, and San Luis Obispo).

Outside the Greater Los Angeles Area, Chinese ethnoburbs are also found in the San Francisco Bay Area, where ethnic Chinese populations are largely concentrated in cities of the East Bay and Santa Clara County. The most prominent Chinese ethnoburb in the region is found in the city of Milpitas, which has a population that is over 60% Asian as of the 2010 U.S. Census. Chinese-oriented shopping centers, markets, and community centers are spread around the city. Other suburbs which have large Chinese populations and commercial activity include Fremont, Cupertino, San Leandro, and Sunnyvale, with the former two having majority Asian American populations and the latter two with plurality Asian American populations as of the 2010 U.S. Census.

== Population ==
List of cities and CDP with Chinese American (Including Taiwanese American) population, according to the 2011–2015 American Community Survey and the 2010 United States Census.

| City/CDP | Chinese Including Taiwanese (2011–2015 ACS) | Percentage (2011–2015 ACS) | Chinese (2010 Census) | Taiwanese (2010 Census) |
|---|---|---|---|---|
| Alhambra | 30,683 | 36.2 | 31,493 | 1,866 |
| Altadena | 624 | 1.4 | 728 | 40 |
| Arcadia | 26,229 | 45.6 | 21,744 | 4,846 |
| Avocado Heights | 861 | 5.4 | 433 | 22 |
| Azusa | 1,062 | 2.2 | 801 | 115 |
| Baldwin Park | 5,951 | 7.8 | 4,086 | 259 |
| Bradbury | 139 | 16.6 | 98 | 47 |
| Charter Oak | 154 | 1.7 | 224 | 11 |
| Citrus | 140 | 1.2 | 111 | 23 |
| Claremont | 2,649 | 7.4 | 1,732 | 317 |
| Covina | 2,012 | 4.1 | 1,453 | 273 |
| Diamond Bar | 15,203 | 26.9 | 12,547 | 3,162 |
| Duarte | 1,211 | 5.6 | 889 | 82 |
| East Pasadena | 1,019 | 16.8 | 842 | 196 |
| East San Gabriel | 6,109 | 38.2 | 4,965 | 809 |
| El Monte | 19,837 | 17.1 | 16,151 | 816 |
| Glendora | 1,314 | 2.6 | 1,207 | 137 |
| Hacienda Heights | 15,127 | 27.4 | 11,348 | 2,944 |
| Industry | 13 | 3.0 | 17 | 2 |
| La Cañada Flintridge | 1,252 | 6.1 | 1,260 | 78 |
| La Habra Heights | 563 | 10.4 | 361 | 60 |
| La Puente | 1,839 | 4.5 | 1,010 | 86 |
| La Verne | 849 | 2.7 | 707 | 72 |
| Mayflower Village | 1,162 | 21.4 | 903 | 146 |
| Monrovia | 2,623 | 7.1 | 1,605 | 199 |
| Montebello | 3,377 | 5.3 | 2,749 | 82 |
| Monterey Park | 27,244 | 44.6 | 29,537 | 1,233 |
| North El Monte | 1,072 | 26.0 | 869 | 114 |
| Pasadena | 8,848 | 6.3 | 7,316 | 887 |
| Pomona | 4,899 | 3.2 | 3,460 | 445 |
| Rosemead | 19,480 | 35.7 | 20,548 | 461 |
| Rowland Heights | 18,276 | 36.2 | 16,563 | 3,476 |
| San Dimas | 2,015 | 5.9 | 1,000 | 169 |
| San Gabriel | 16,893 | 42.0 | 17,137 | 1,009 |
| San Marino | 5,776 | 43.3 | 4,707 | 1,498 |
| San Pasqual | 185 | 9.3 | 206 | 39 |
| Sierra Madre | 744 | 6.7 | 427 | 27 |
| South El Monte | 1,004 | 5.1 | 1,222 | 33 |
| South Pasadena | 3,432 | 13.2 | 4,132 | 428 |
| South San Gabriel | 1,941 | 21.8 | 2,385 | 38 |
| South San Jose Hills | 563 | 2.7 | 566 | 64 |
| Temple City | 15,741 | 43.6 | 13,931 | 1,964 |
| Valinda | 522 | 2.2 | 645 | 36 |
| Vincent | 576 | 3.4 | 322 | 16 |
| Walnut | 10,296 | 34.4 | 9,242 | 2,064 |
| West Covina | 10,534 | 9.8 | 9,089 | 1,347 |
| West Puente Valley | 698 | 2.9 | 468 | 20 |
| Whittier | 965 | 1.1 | 923 | 103 |

== See also ==
- History of Chinese Americans
- History of the Chinese Americans in Los Angeles
- List of U.S. cities with significant Chinese-American populations
- Little Saigon#San Gabriel Valley
