= Mesa Oaks, California =

Mesa Oaks is the name of multiple places in California including:

- Mesa Oaks, Los Angeles County, California, an alternative name for West San Dimas
- Mesa Oaks, Santa Barbara County, California, a community in the Lompoc Healthcare District
