= ROMS =

ROMS may refer to:

- Ringgit Operations Monitoring System, an FX market regulatory reporting system owned and operated by Bank Negara Malaysia, the central bank of Malaysia.
- The Roma people
- "ROMs" is also the plural of ROM
- Royal Oak Middle School
- Russian Organization for Multimedia and Digital Systems
- Regional Ocean Modeling System
