= Charter Oak Unified School District =

School district in California, United States

Coordinates: 34.102668°N 117.858405°W

District information
- Motto: Learn Today, Lead Tomorrow
- Grades: PreK, TK, K-12, and Adult
- Established: 1894
- Superintendent: Danny Kim
- Enrollment: 4,540 (2019-2020)

Other information
- Website: www.cousd.net

Charter Oak Unified School District (COUSD) is a unified school district with administrative offices in Covina, California, serving nearly 5,000 students in the unincorporated community of Charter Oak and portions of the cities of Covina, Glendora and San Dimas, and the unincorporated community of West San Dimas. The superintendent is Danny Kim.

== Governance ==
Charter Oak Unified School District is governed by a five-member board of education, which appoints a superintendent, who runs the daily operations of the district. Board members are elected directly by voters residing within the district. Current board members are: Brian R. Akers, President; Gregg Peterson, Vice President; Jane E. Bock; Jeanette V. Flores and David Rose.

== Early history ==
Charter Oak School Unified District traces its roots to 1894. Charter Oak School opened in September of that year with 24 students housed in a tent. The one-room school house opened in November. A second classroom was added in 1903. Bonds were approved in 1911 to build two more classrooms. A third classroom was completed later that year and the fourth was open in 1915. Electric lights were installed in 1920. In September 1922, a new school building was built using $60,000 in school bonds. The new school had eight classrooms, a principal's office, teachers’ restroom and an outdoor stage with an open-air auditorium to accommodate the school's 220 pupils. The original school building was converted into a cafeteria. In 1928, a $10,000 bond was passed to build a manual arts building and state-of-the-art cafeteria.

== Schools ==
=== Elementary schools (K-6) ===
- Badillo Elementary School, 1997 California Distinguished School. Special programs: Advancement Via Individual Determination, Accelerated Reader, Accelerated Math, Positive Behavior Interventions and Supports, Transitional Kindergarten
- Cedargrove Elementary School, 1987, 1995, and 2010 California Distinguished School. Special programs: Advancement Via Individual Determination, Accelerated Reader, Accelerated Math, Gifted and Talented Education, Positive Behavior Interventions and Supports, Transitional Kindergarten
- Glen Oak Elementary School, 2009-10 California Title 1 Academic Achievement Award. Special programs: Advancement Via Individual Determination, Accelerated Reader, Accelerated Math, Positive Behavior Interventions and Supports, STEAM Academy
- Washington Elementary School, 2002 California Distinguished School. Special programs: Advancement Via Individual Determination, Accelerated Reader, Accelerated Math, Gifted and Talented Education, Positive Behavior Interventions and Support, Transitional Kindergarten
- Willow Elementary School, 1998, 2010, and 2014 California Distinguished School; 2016 Gold Ribbon School.; 2010-11 California Title 1 Academic Achievement Award Special programs: Advancement Via Individual Determination, Accelerated Reader, Accelerated Math, Gifted and Talented Education, Positive Behavior Interventions and Supports, Project Lead the Way

=== Middle schools (7-8) ===
- Royal Oak Middle School, 1996 California Distinguished School. Special programs: Advancement Via Individual Determination, Accelerated Reader, Accelerated Math, Gifted and Talented Education, Positive Behavior Interventions and Supports, Project Lead the Way, STEAM Academy

=== High schools (9-12) ===
- Charter Oak High School, 1996, 2007 California Distinguished School; 2015 Gold Ribbon School. Special programs: International Baccalaureate, Advanced Placement, Project Lead the Way Biomedical pathway, Project Lead the Way Engineering Design and Development Academy, Business Educational Technology Academy (BETA)

==== Arrow High School ====
Arrow High School is a public continuation high school in the Charter Oak Unified School District. It is located in the City of Glendora, California, in the San Gabriel Valley east of Los Angeles. The school serves 10th, 11th and 12th graders in the communities of Covina, Glendora and San Dimas who are deficient in credits needed to graduate high school. Arrow High School is accredited by the Western Association of Schools and Colleges. It was named a Model Continuation High School by the California Continuation Education Association in 2015.

=== Alternative programs (K-12) ===
- Oak Knoll Alternative School offers online and in-classroom instruction for home-schooled and independent study students.

== Enrollment ==
Enrollment in the 2019–2020 school year is 4,540. The majority of students are Hispanic, with a large white minority and smaller minorities of Asian Americans and African Americans.

Ethnic composition of student body: 2019-20
	Percent
Hispanic or Latino of any race	70.1%
American Indian or Alaska Native	0.6%
Asian	5.2%
Pacific Islander	0.1%
Filipino	2.7%
African American	2.6%
White, non-Hispanic	15.9%
Two or more Races	2.8%
