= San Dimas Dog Park =

Public facility in San Dimas, California

- Interactive map of San Dimas Dog Park
- Type: Dog park
- Location: San Dimas, California
- Coordinates: 34.109089°N 117.794479°W
- Elevation: 1,087 metres (3,566 ft)
- Created: 2005
- Open: Mon-Fri: 7am-8pm

The San Dimas Dog Park is an off-leash dog park in San Dimas, California. It is located inside of Horsethief Canyon Park. The dog park features separate large and small dog sections, drinking fountains, picnic tables, and is known for being a rare dog park with grass near the Inland Empire.

The dog park was founded in 2005 by Caryol Smith, an animal welfare advocate previously known for her involvement with the Wildlife WayStation. After founding the dog park, Smith became a parks and recreation commissioner and was recognized as the 2014 San Dimas Citizen of the Year.
