= Ethnoburb =

Suburban area with a specific ethnic minority

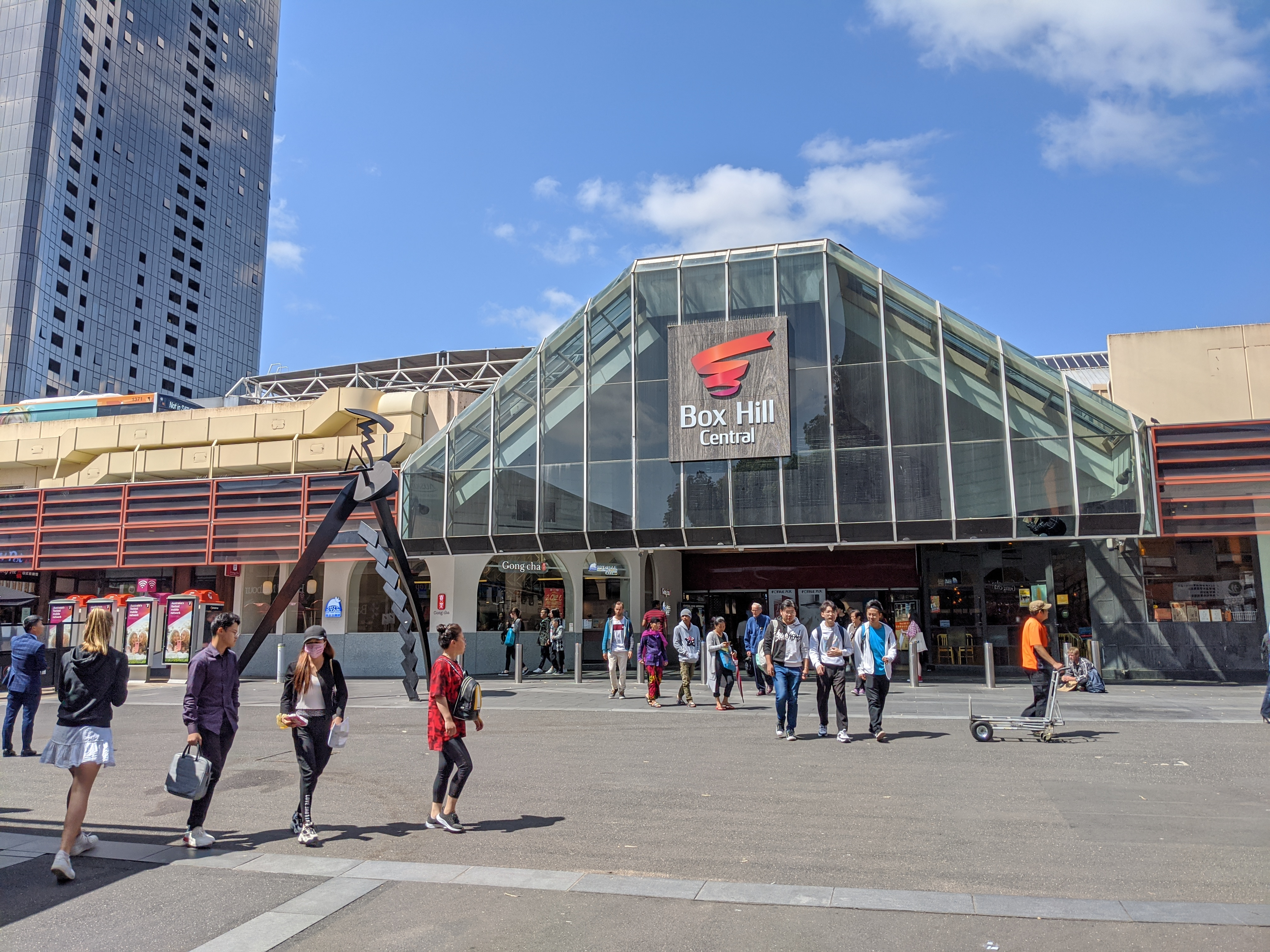
Box Hill, Victoria contains a sizeable Chinese population. According to the 2021 Australian census, 46.6% of the suburb's population were of Chinese ancestry, 29.5% of the suburb's population was born in China, while 42.4% of the suburb's population spoke either Mandarin or Cantonese at home.

An ethnoburb is a suburban residential and business area with a notable cluster of a particular ethnic minority population, which may or may not be a local majority. That can greatly influence the social geography within the area because of distinct cultural and religious values. Ethnoburbs allow for ethnic minority groups to maintain their traditional identity, forestalling cultural assimilation.

According to Dr. Wei Li, the author of many writings on the subject, the ethnoburb has resulted from "the influence of international geopolitical and global economic restructuring, changing national immigration and trade policies, and local demographic, economic and political contexts."

Although many assume that an ethnoburb is composed of immigrants with a lower economic status, that may not always be the case, as many ethnoburbs are made up of wealthy and high economic status individuals in more expensive neighbourhoods and communities.

== History of term ==
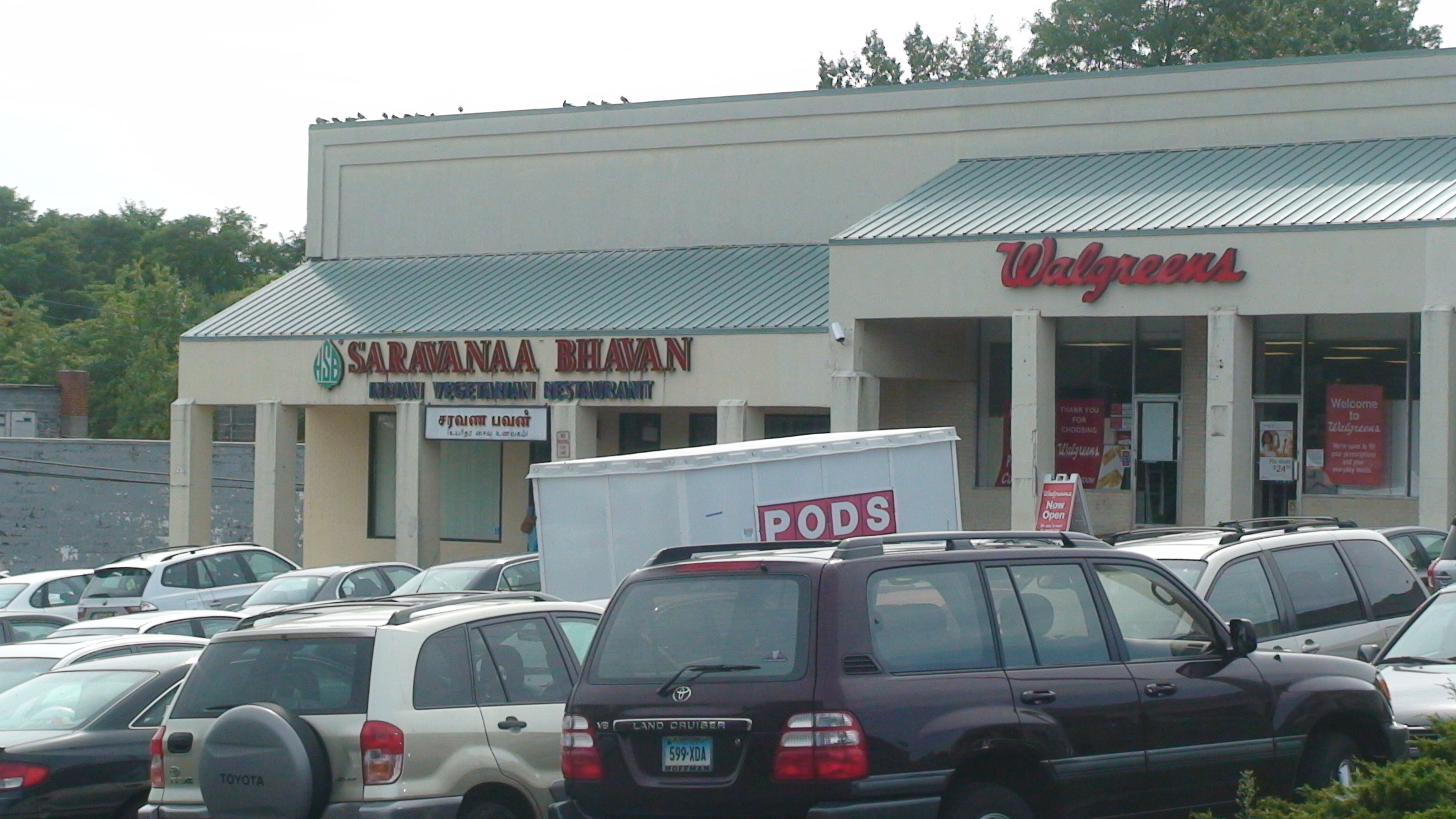
Little India (Edison/Iselin) in New Jersey comprises residents over 30% of whom are of Indian-American ancestry.

The term was first coined in 1997 by Dr. Wei Li, then assistant professor of geography and Asian American studies at the University of Connecticut, in a paper examining the suburban Chinese population in Los Angeles. She further examines and delineates the difference between "Chinatowns" and "ethnoburbs" in "Ethnoburb versus Chinatown: Two Types of Urban Ethnic Communities in Los Angeles."

Ethnoburbs emerge in combination or as separate entities for reasons like significant changes in world politics and the world economy, policy changes in the US, and demographic shifts in individual or in local connecting neighborhoods. Such communities have substantial external connections to the globalised mainstream economy, leading to higher socioeconomic levels in its residents. An ethnoburb functions as a social hub and a place in which immigrants may work and do business within their own networks. That definition of an ethnoburb closely resembles that of the ethnic enclave as defined and studied by sociologists Wilson and Portes. Though the terms are different, the types and functions of these hubs are nearly identical. The formation of ethnoburbs also have an effect on the cultural and political characteristics of a city. In cities like San Francisco, Vancouver, and Toronto; in the New York City-Philadelphia and Washington, DC areas; and in the San Gabriel Valley, for example, Chinese immigrants have built large houses and malls catering to Chinese businesses, changing the landscape of the communities and a significant number of smaller ones throughout Canada and the US.

Ethnoburb: The New Ethnic Community in Urban America explores in depth the phenomenon of ethnoburbs scattered through the United States. The book used the term "ethnoburb" for the first time, in 1997, to describe the new formation of contemporary suburban Asian settlements, and the author continues her studies in larger metropolitan areas in the US and in Canada.

The term has become widely used in academia and is slowly gaining usage in the popular vernacular.

== Community dynamics ==
Ethnoburbs present interesting benefits and disadvantages to those within the community. They can be shaped to meet the specific cultural and social needs of those who live there because of the high degree of ethnic similarities. That can be seen as a benefit as it aids in the adaptation of immigrants to a new environment in terms of language, culture, education, and job training. Also, the sharing of common cultural traditions and new experiences encountered allows a greater sense of community to be developed. An ethnoburb not only contributes to the fostering of cultural preservation particularly amongst immigrants but also can play an important role in the larger cultural tapestry of a greater regional area or country as a whole.

On the other hand, ethnoburbs are sometimes viewed in a negative. It is thought that they can inhibit cultural assimilation because those living in these regions will become comfortable within the community and not expand to incorporate social elements from outside their community. One way that can be mitigated is educational programs and the completion of public or private schooling. Because the dominant culture within an ethnoburb is not always the majority of the population since other ethnicities are also present, it can be helpful if the other cultures are also integrated into the regional identity to lessen the degree of severe representation and catering towards one ethnic group.

White flight can also be a result of ethnoburbs. Min Zhou, Yen-fen Tseng, and Rebecca Y. Kim claim:

In the past, the movement of ethnic minorities of lower SES [socioeconomic status] into urban neighborhoods triggered white flight into the suburbs. The current movement of immigrants of higher SES into the suburbs has ushered in a similar trend because newcomers have settled without going through the time-honored process of acculturation. They pose a new threat to the established white middle-class residents, who fear being “un-Americanized” by the newcomers. The Chinese ethnoburb shows that affluent immigrants from Asia, no less than blacks and Hispanics, can be perceived as a threat to white middle-class communities when they achieve a substantial presence.

Within Canada, the presence of ethnic communities is often favoured. That is a result of the country's belief in supporting a cultural mosaic in which individuals maintain their unique cultural identity after their immigration. Ethnoburbs are often viewed as an "expression of preferences, common interests, social networks and the cultural and/or religious residents... [serving] as the basis for their integration into the Canadian economy and society."

That view may not be shared by all geographical regions and is still an issue of contention in some areas of Canada, as ethnoburbs can present both beneficial and negative elements that may either provide a pathway for the adaptation into a new society or the hindering of assimilation by cultural division.

In comparison, the United States has historically often discouraged the maintenance of cultural identity after immigration by melting pot policies and encouragement to adopt the "American" way of life. However, there has still been an increasing trend in the United States for ethnic minority groups to maintain their cultural identity and individuality from the general American identity after immigration.

== Contrasting concepts ==
The ethnoburb concept was developed in reference to the United States, and mainly applies there and in countries with similar immigration and urban planning contexts, such as Australia and Canada. Suburban ethnic enclaves in other counties are described with other concepts.

=== Banlieue ===
In the French-speaking world, the word for a suburb, banlieue, has taken on a connotation of racial and economic segregation and deprivation. In the inverse of the "white flight" phenomenon seen in the United States in the twentieth century, immigrants to France—primarily from former French colonies, notably Francophone Africa—often moved to Habitations à Loyer Modéré (low-rent apartment buildings) building in suburban areas around Paris and other large cities, rather than to older neighbourhoods in the "inner city". Of course immigrants moved to the city proper as well, but rents in Paris are generally too high for the newly-arrived; therefore the banlieues (or many of theme) became increasingly identified as immigrant neighbourhoods, even as new generations of Black- and Arab-descended French citizens were born there.

== Examples ==
=== Vancouver, British Columbia ===
Geographic distribution of residents of Chinese ancestry in Greater Vancouver

Geographic distribution of residents of South Asian ancestry in Greater Vancouver

The Greater Vancouver Regional District (GVRD) is home to a number of ethnic suburbs, each with its own unique characteristics. In recent years, changes to immigration policies have made the municipalities magnets for immigrants. Here, members of the community find acceptance, security and comfort in the presence of common cultural practices. However, in some situations, increasing segregation has led to tension.

In the past 40 years, the Canadian immigration policy has adopted a multicultural model, with immigrants being granted equal rights in all facets of society Prior to 1962, the Canadian federal government used a country of origin preference system to grant immigration status. The removal of this policy and the introduction of a points system in 1967 caused an influx of immigration to the GVRD. The integration of newly arrived immigrants into the ethnoburbs of Metropolitan Vancouver has increased the diversity of the city but some might argue segregation based on ethnicity has risen in recent years.

This socially constructed segregation has physical ramifications on the landscape. In Vancouver's case, increased immigration of affluent East Asians has also meant a boom in the housing market. The expansion of real estate development in the 1980s and 1990s lead to the transformation of post war suburbs into areas dominated by infamous "Vancouver Specials," monster homes, and megamalls. The extravagant building types have become points of contention in the GVRD. Along with that, a growing fear of longtime Canadians is that increasing immigration means decreased space in "good schools". Such factors feed the argument that spatial segregation based on ethnicity effects the social fabric of communities. Today, nearly 40,000 people immigrate to the GVRD every year, approximately 30,000 from Asia, with China and India as the two major source countries. The result has been the formation of ethnically-distinct municipalities such as Richmond and Surrey.

Richmond and Surrey are not the only ethnic enclaves in the GVRD. Several neighbourhoods in Vancouver proper have formed, based on lines of heritage. Chinatown, Little Italy, Little India (Punjabi Market) and more are examples of such communities. They are on a smaller scale than Richmond or Surrey. Mapping of ethnicity in Greater Vancouver shows that populations, although concentrated in some areas, disperse out on a gradient. Research on the subject depicts the landscapes as places of integration and acceptance. Increasing diversity has increased the liveability of this growing metropolis. There are, of course, challenges to multiculturalism. Nonetheless, they are communities with deep roots, unique traditions, and shared social identities. From May 2013, the Canadian government tightened the language requirements for all immigrants, and reduced the benefits for immigrants who spoke both of Canada's two official languages. Here, there are increased opportunities for immigrants upon arrival in Canada.

==== Richmond, British Columbia ====
Large communities of visible minorities have changed the cultural landscape Vancouver's suburbs, adding to the diverse society that the GVRD prides itself on. Massive shopping malls built in the 1980s such as Aberdeen and Yaohan centres, are focused solely on Chinese clientele. Such shopping centres are highly specialized and highly successful. On average, 19.6% of the GVRD's population is Chinese. In some parts of Richmond, British Columbia, 66.9% of the population have Chinese heritage. For many new immigrants and long time residents alike, it is a great comfort to be able to buy familiar foods and communicate with shop keepers in their native languages. However, some would argue the absence of English from signage and service creates tension within the Richmond community.

However, tensions aside, Richmond's unique blend of culture has added to the mosaic of the city. Some Christians with Hong Kong roots take comfort in Cantonese sermons, being able to connect on personal, congregational, regional and international levels of community. Richmond is also home to many Buddhist temples and societies. The Ling Yen Mountain Temple is an active monastery, and boasts 10,000 members in Greater Vancouver.

Richmond also hosts many festivals, including the Summer Night Market. which highlights East Asian Canadian culture and celebrate diversity.

==== Surrey, British Columbia ====
Another predominant ethnoburb filled with temples and shopping centres is in Surrey, British Columbia. Stretching from Newton to Bear Creek Park, from Strawberry Hill to Kennedy Heights, the neighbourhood is a picture of ethnic integration. According to Douglas Todd of The Vancouver Sun, a fifth of Canada's South Asian community is found in Surrey, and many neighbourhoods are "intensely monoethnic." Moreover, census data reveals that two thirds residents of Surrey have South Asian heritage. On average, 12.0% of the GVRD's population is South Asian however in some parts of Surrey, South Asians account for 70.7% of residents, a higher concentration than Chinese residents in Richmond.

Based on Todd's case study of west Newton, people there do not feel segregated by ethnicity. Instead, there is a sense of familiarity, and community cohesiveness, despite Surrey's reputation for violence. That unique sense of place and the resulting geographies of such communities is in part due to the high occurrence of family migration practices. These practices are another result of evolving Canadian immigration policies.

Like Richmond, Surrey residents are proud of their contributions to social aspects of their communities. There are numerous Sikh gurdwaras, Hindu mandirs and Muslim mosques, alongside western houses of worship. Festivals in both cities invite thousands of people every year to experience a sampling of different ethnic backgrounds. Surrey hosts a massive Vaisakhi Parade & Celebration during April, the largest outside India.

=== Los Angeles, California ===
One of the largest cities in the United States, Los Angeles, California is a culturally-diverse urban area with pockets of ethnic communities within the city, including many Chinatowns. As populations in the urban regions continued to grow and became increasingly congested, many ethnic groups began migrating out of the urban centre of Los Angeles and into newer and more affordable suburban communities surrounding the city,Li, Wei (2009). Ethnoburb: The New Ethnic Community in Urban America. Honolulu: University of Hawaii Press. p. 62. thus increasing their quality of life from that of a downtown, inner-city neighbourhood, to a more open and clean suburban community. In particular, many ethnic communities in Los Angeles moved to the nearby San Gabriel Valley, especially Monterey Park. In addition to escaping regional congestion, this area offered further geographical opportunities as it "is bordered by three major freeways... making it easier to get downtown, where most jobs were located, and to Chinatown."

Los Angeles is also an interesting example when examining the distinct difference between an ethnoburb and a Chinatown. In the article "Ethnoburb Versus Chinatown: Two Types of Urban Communities in Los Angeles," Dr. Wei Li looks at these differences by comparing the Chinatown communities within downtown Los Angeles and the ethnoburbs in the surrounding San Gabriel Valley area. By examining historical records, census data, and conducting interviews, she reveals how the Chinese community within the region, in particular, has greatly evolved from densely populated Chinatowns in the downtown to more geographically spread out regions in an ethnic suburb. For example, according to Li, "the San Gabriel Valley ethnoburb had become by 1990 a more important Chinese residential area than Chinatown." Li also explains how the ethnoburb offers more opportunities than a Chinatown, as there are additional economic benefits through business opportunities when catering towards the regional cultural identity.

She reveals further differences between an ethnoburb and Chinatown in that the composition of the populations vary in terms of age, socioeconomic level, and time since their immigration. Within a Chinatown, the population is mainly "immigrants of Chinese descendants from mainland China and Southeast Asia, with a much older age structure and longer duration of residence... [and] socio-economic status of its residents is lower." In contrast, although culturally an ethnoburb may appear to cater towards a specific ethnic group, the regional areas tend to include a more ethnically diverse population, which is composed of a greater variety of age groups with a higher socioeconomic status. In addition, a higher level of education is more common within an ethnoburb when compared to a Chinatown, thus allowing for a greater degree of use and understanding of English within the areas. Thus, Li's findings show that an ethnoburb can be culturally positive in the sense that it allows for more opportunities than a Chinatown.

=== Auckland, New Zealand ===
Auckland, which has a predominantly European population, as well as one of the highest Polynesian populations in the world, experienced a dramatic increase in Asian migration during the 1900s. Over the past 20 years, many Asian immigrants migrating to Auckland have settled into "ethnoburbs". About 60% of the Chinese population in New Zealand lives in Auckland and by 1990, they were the fourth-largest ethnic group, and people started settling in East and South Auckland. The areas were of existing high quality housing or brand new neighborhoods. By 2006, all of Auckland was considered its own Chinese ethnoburb because of Auckland's already small population, based on Li Wei's concept of ethnoburbs. The spatial distributions in Auckland proposed there would be three large ethnoburb regions: North Shore City (North Auckland), Auckland City (Central East Auckland) and Manukau City (East Auckland). It is said that Chinese people come to New Zealand not only for economic reasons but also for better education, the relaxed lifestyle and the stable political system.

=== Washington, D.C. area ===
The Washington D.C. area has a large amount of significant ethnoburbs for its immigrant populations, due to the rising house prices and limited space in the District itself. The immigrant populations that have notable ethnoburbs in the D.C. area are Salvadoran, Guatemalan, Ethiopian, Indian, Korean, Vietnamese, and Chinese.

Many Salvadoran and Guatemalan immigrants have increasingly settled into suburbs in Prince George's County on the border with D.C., with suburbs such as Chillum, Brentwood, Wheaton, and Langley Park, some which have developed a majority or plurality-Central American population, in particular Langley Park, which is up to 75% Central American, as well as Brentwood (41% Central American), Chillum (39% Central American), and Wheaton (29% Central American).

Despite the existence of a thriving Little Ethiopia in D.C., as Ethiopians are D.C.'s second-largest immigrant population, rising property prices in the areas where Ethiopians established businesses, such as Shaw and Adams Morgan, Ethiopians have now been moving northwards and establishing significant populations and businesses in areas such as Silver Spring, Takoma Park, Wheaton, and Forest Glen. Silver Spring in particular is known for its second "Little Ethiopia" with a concentration of Ethiopian-owned businesses.

Bangladeshi, Indian, and Pakistani American communities have rapidly established population centers in Northern Virginia and Montgomery County; Vietnamese ethnoburbs include Seven Corners, Falls Church, and Springfield; Korean ethnoburbs include Annandale and Centreville; and Chinese ethnoburbs in Montgomery County include Potomac, North Potomac, and Rockville.

=== Toronto, Ontario ===
Many Chinese residents live outside the downtown Chinatown area and in suburbs of the Greater Toronto Area. Spatial patterns of ethnic residential and business districts have been shaped mainly by development in the suburbs. Only 18% of the 338,265 Chinese residents in Toronto live in the downtown area, as the rest live in suburbs. Areas with a lower population Chinese residents (closer to the downtown area) are in East York, Etobicoke, North York, Scarborough, and York, which account for 47% of the Chinese population. Areas that are on the outer suburb zone (Markham, Richmond Hill, and Mississauga) make up the remaining percentage of Chinese population. In recent years, the Chinese economy in the Greater Toronto Area has changed from local restaurants and grocery stores to consumer services in large shopping centres. That has brought more shopping centres to the inner and outer suburbs, enlarging Toronto's economy.

Much like in Los Angeles, the Chinese population in Toronto also stratifies along lines of origin and socioeconomic class that show up in residential patterns. Immigrants from Hong Kong were the largest population from China to Toronto and moved to Markham and Richmond Hill, which influenced the style of the new upscale shopping centres. Immigrants from Taiwan settled in North York because of the public school system.

In addition to the Chinese community, Toronto's massive South Asian community has also developed in the suburbs of Brampton (52% South Asian) and Mississauga (25% South Asian). Notably, South Asians are the fastest growing minority group in the distant Toronto suburbs of Milton and Ajax, and numerous Hindu, Sikh, and Muslim places of worship have been built in those areas.

=== Melbourne, Australia ===
Australia is also undergoing a shift in its demography with large numbers of Asian immigrants settling in the country. From 2010 to 2011, Australia recorded 14,611 settlers from China and according to the 2011 census, there were 393,924 people in Australia born in Mainland China and Hong Kong. Sydney had nearly half of all Chinese-born citizens (46.6%) and Melbourne had slightly over a quarter (28.5%) according to the census data.

Melbourne has received some of the focus of the changing demographics because of Asian immigration. Glen Waverley is a community in Melbourne with a large proportion of Chinese-Australian citizens. According to an article in The Age, Glen Waverley has many Chinese immigrants because the area provides high-quality education, good transportation and safety, making it the hub of Chinese Melbourne. According to the article, public high schools in the area have been inundated with Chinese Australians, representing up to 80% of the student population. According to another article in The Age, European luxury vehicles, such as Audi and BMW, are the most popular car brands in Glen Waverley.

== See also ==
- Ethnic enclave
- San Gabriel, California
  - Chinese enclaves in the San Gabriel Valley
- Indian reservation/colony in the United States
- (Urban) Indian reserve in Canada
