= Lompoc Valley Medical Center =

Lompoc Valley Medical Center: Hospital
- Lompoc Healthcare District

Geography
- Location: 1515 East Ocean Avenue, Lompoc, California, United States
- Coordinates: 34°38′27″N 120°26′22″W

Organization
- Type: General

Services
- Beds: 60 beds

Helipads
- Helipad: No

History
- Former name: Lompoc District Hospital
- Founded: 1946

Links
- Website: www.lompocvmc.com
- Lists: Hospitals in California

The Lompoc Valley Medical Center, owned and operated by Lompoc Valley Medical Center, is a 60-bed general acute care rural, district hospital located in Lompoc, California.

== History ==
The Lompoc Valley Medical Center was established in 1946. It was the founding hospital of the Lompoc Healthcare District, one of the first districts of its kind in California.

=== Name ===
The original name for the medical center was Lompoc District Hospital for many years. The name was shortened to Lompoc Hospital, and in 2006 was renamed to Lompoc Valley Medical Center.

=== Location and Facility ===
Originally located at 508 East Hickory Avenue, new building safety requirements mandated by the California Senate Bill 1953 (SB 1953) led to a decision by the Board of Directors to propose the building of a new hospital at 1515 East Ocean Ave. Lompoc Valley voters approved the $75 million Measure I in June 2010 by 87 percent—reportedly the highest success rate for a special district bond in California history. The cost of construction and non-moveable equipment was paid for via the issuance of 2006 Bonds and 2007 Bonds. Community members also contributed $4 million in donations from a capital campaign for interior equipment and furniture.

Construction on the new 115,500 square foot, 60-bed replacement hospital was performed by ProWest Constructors. The doors opened at the new hospital June 29, 2010.

== Licensing ==
Lompoc Valley Medical Center: Hospital is licensed by the California Department of Public Health as a general, acute care hospital for 60-beds.

=== Bed Classification/Services ===
- 6-bed intensive care
- 6-bed Perinatal
- 48-bed Unspecified General Acute Care

==== Other Approved Services ====
- Basic Emergency Medical - ER services
- Nuclear Medicine
- Outpatient Services - Diagnostic Imaging at LVMC Outpatient Imaging Center, 111 E Ocean Avenue, Suite 2, Lompoc
- Outpatient Services - Sleep Disorder Center at LVMC Sleep Disorder Center, 228 S D Street, Lompoc
- Outpatient Services - Surgical
- Physical Therapy
- Respiratory Care Services
- Surgery and Anesthesia Services

== Accreditations, Memberships and Designations ==
Lompoc Valley Medical Center: Hospital is licensed, regulated, inspected, accredited and/or certified by the following agencies:

- California Department of Public Health Licensing and Certification Program (L&C)
- U.S. Department of Health and Human Services’ Centers for Medicare and Medicaid Services (CMS)
- The Joint Commission (laboratory and blood bank services)
- American Association of Blood Banks
- American College of Radiology
- Center for Improvement in Healthcare Quality
