= Charter Oak High School =

Location
- 1430 East Covina Blvd. Covina, California 91724; United States; 34°5′55″N 117°51′38″W

Information
- Type: Public Secondary
- Established: 1959; 67 years ago
- School district: Charter Oak Unified School District
- NCES School ID: 060819000801
- Principal: Robin Perez
- Grades: 9–12
- Gender: Co-ed
- Enrollment: 1,299 (2023–2024)
- Colors: Blue and Gold
- Athletics conference: Valle Vista
- Nickname: Chargers
- Rival: Glendora High School
- Website: cohs.cousd.net

Charter Oak High School is a four-year comprehensive secondary school in the Charter Oak Unified School District. It is located in the City of Covina, California, in the San Gabriel Valley east of Los Angeles. The school serves 9th, 10th, 11th and 12th graders from the communities of Covina, Azusa and Glendora. Enrollment in 2023–24 was 1,299. Charter Oak High School, which opened in 1959, is accredited by the Western Association of Schools and Colleges.

Charter Oak High School was named a California Distinguished School in 1996 and 2007 and a 2015 Gold Ribbon School.

The school also was named one of the top 1,500 high schools in the country by Newsweek magazine in 2009.

== Academic programs ==
- International Baccalaureate (IB) program: Charter Oak was the first Los Angeles County high school to adopt the rigorous IB program.
- BETA (Business Educational Technology Academy)
- Health and Wellness Academy: Project Lead the Way biomedical pathway program
- Project Lead the Way Engineering Design and Development Academy
- Advanced Placement
- Advancement Via Individual Determination (AVID)
- Sports Medicine

== Notable alumni ==
- LaVar Arrington II, college football player
- Shane Bowers, Major League Baseball player
- Jason David, Retired NFL cornerback, Class of 2000
- Mike Dyer, Major League Baseball player
- Eddie Fisher, drummer for OneRepublic, Class of 1992
- Chuck Henry, Television Journalist - Class of 1963
- John Molina Jr., Retired professional championship boxer, Class of 2001
- Vince Neil (Lead Singer) Mötley Crüe - Class of 1979
- Roger Nelson, Major League Baseball Player (Chicago White Sox, Baltimore Orioles, Kansas City Royals, Cincinnati Reds) - Class of 1962
- Jeron Roberts (born 1976), American-Israeli basketball player
- Keith Smith, NFL fullback - Class of 2010
- Ron Wilson, The Surfaris drummer/singer Wipe Out Surfer Joe - Class of 1963

== Enrollment ==
Enrollment in the 2016–2017 school year is 1,566. The majority of students are Hispanic, with a large white minority and smaller minorities of African Americans and Asian Americans.

Ethnic composition of student body: 2016-17
	Percent
Hispanic or Latino	62.4%
American Indian or Alaska Native	0.4%
Asian	4.7%
Pacific Islander	0.3%
Filipino	3.0%
African American	3.8%
White	22.8%
Two or more Races	2.6%
