= LaVar Arrington II =

American football player (born 2007)

No. 11 – Penn State Nittany Lions
- Position: Linebacker
- Class: Freshman

Personal information
- Born: May 16, 2007 (age 19); Annapolis, Maryland, U.S.
- Listed height: 6 ft 3 in (1.91 m)
- Listed weight: 219 lb (99 kg)

Career information
- High school: Charter Oak (Covina, California)
- College: Penn State (2025–present)
- Stats at ESPN

LaVar Lamon Arrington II (born May 16, 2007) is an American college football player, who currently plays outside linebacker for the Penn State Nittany Lions.

== Early life ==
Arrington II was born with his twin sister Laila in Annapolis, Maryland, on May 16, 2007. They are the children of former professional football player LaVar Arrington.

He attended Charter Oak High School, where he played linebacker and finished his junior season with 12 sacks. Arrington II then committed to Pennsylvania State University in July 2024, passing on offers from Oregon, Tennessee, and UCLA.

Following his senior season, he was named an All-American and represented the West in the 2025 All-American Bowl.

== College career ==
Arrington II joined the Penn State Nittany Lions in January 2025 as an early enrollee. He will wear the number 11, which was also worn by his father when he played for Penn State.
