= Lompoc Healthcare District =

Lompoc Valley Medical Center
- Company type: Public
- Industry: Healthcare
- Predecessor: Lompoc Healthcare District, Lompoc Hospital District
- Founded: Lompoc, California (1946)
- Headquarters: Lompoc, United States
- Number of locations: 9 facilities (Mar 2019)
- Area served: Lompoc Valley
- Key people: Steve Popkin (CEO); Yvette Cope (COO); Jim White (CIO); Dustin Cheney (CFO); Dr. Randall Michel (CMO); Melissa Debacker (CQAO)
- Number of employees: 775 (2018); 600 (2010)
- Website: lompocvmc.com

Lompoc Valley Medical Center (formerly Lompoc Healthcare District) is a community-created, government entity authorized by California state law to deliver healthcare services to the residents of the Lompoc Valley. The District is a political agency and receives operating property taxes annually based on the assessed value of taxable real property located within the District.

Lompoc Healthcare District owns and operates the following facilities:

- Comprehensive Care Center: a 110-bed skilled nursing and rehabilitation facility.
- Lompoc Valley Medical Center- a 60-bed, General Acute Care Hospital.
- Lompoc Health - Counseling Center
- Lompoc Health - Hematology-Oncology
- Lompoc Health - Sleep Disorder Center
- Lompoc Health - North H Center (formerly Sansum Clinic)
- Lompoc Health - North Third Center (formerly Valley Medical Group)

== History ==
The first operating healthcare district established in California, Lompoc Healthcare District, was created in 1946 by a vote of the registered voters of the proposed district and by resolution of the Santa Barbara County Board of Supervisors. The District is organized and operates under the Local Health Care District Law of the State of California.

From 2014 to 2017, Lompoc Valley Medical Center owned and operated the Champion Center, a 50-bed addiction treatment facility. The facility was closed in 2017 following the partial retirement of the facility's medical director, Dr. Gilbert Andersen.

=== Name ===
Founded under the name Lompoc Hospital District, the organization renamed itself Lompoc Healthcare District in order to represent the wide spectrum of care and facilities provided. On Jan. 1, 2008, the name was changed from Lompoc Healthcare District to Lompoc Valley Medical Center.

=== Boundaries ===
The District's boundaries are the Pacific Ocean on the west and south, Highway 101 on the east, and the San Antonio River on the north. The only city located within the District is the city of Lompoc. Other communities in the boundary include Vandenberg Air Force Base, Vandenberg Village, Mesa Oaks, and Mission Hills.

== See also ==
- Lompoc Hospital Foundation
- Lompoc, California topics
- Medical and health organizations based in the United States
