= Ringgit Operations Monitoring System =

Ringgit Operations Monitoring System (ROMS) is a large-value foreign exchange transaction reporting system owned and operated by Bank Negara Malaysia (BNM), the central bank of Malaysia. It automates a major part of compliance reporting between Authorised Dealers (who are licensed FX intermediaries) and Bank Negara Malaysia (BNM).

ROMS is built using web-based technology and runs on a web browser on a PC workstation to minimise cost, ease maintenance and establish a user-friendly interface.

Data security is implemented by using a secure private broadband network between BNM and financial institutions. This network is called FINET. ROMS is not deployed over the Internet. FINET in turn, runs over COINS, a nationwide enterprise level data network operated by Telekom Malaysia, the national telecommunication provider. Users are authenticated via a password challenge-response process, IP address registration and digital certificates.

Reporting financial institutions are required to report all wholesale FX transactions above US$1 million on trade date basis.

The daily system start-up time for ROMS is at 8:00 a.m. while the system cut-off time for the submission via ROMS is at 5:00 p.m. Any extension on the system cut-off time is at BNM's discretion based on the financial institution (FI) or authorised dealer (AD) request; however, the authorised dealer will be charged a specific fine in order to do so.

If a failure to submit all transaction reports occurs on the same day into the ROMS system, BNM will impose a fine to the specific AD as a penalty.

Other FX transactions below US$1 million and above RM 50,000 are recorded on a lagged basis but must be within the fortnightly reporting period (before the 15th and end-of-month).

== Transactions ==
There are three main transaction types inside ROMS which are:

1. Swap
2. Forex
3. Third currency

By the end of day after system closing time, the ROMS manager or the system administrator processes all transactions recorded for the day and extracts them from the ROMS system. Following that, the data is calculated using three type of calculation formats, which are:

- High and low transaction
- High and low rate summary
- High and low transaction full

Afterwards, the data taken from ROMS is submitted to the BNM portal where it is combined with other data from another Foreign Exchange Administration (FEA) system to calculate the exchange rate for that day; the final result is posted on the BNM websites under these following sections:

1. Exchange rates
2. USD/MYR interbank intraday rate
3. Daily FX turnover
4. Interbank swap
