= Royal Oak Middle School =

Location
- 303 S. Glendora Ave. Covina, CA 91724; Los Angeles; 34.0836°N 117.8645°W

Information
- School type: Public, Middle School
- Motto: Every Student, Every Day; Whatever It Takes
- Opened: 1927
- School district: Charter Oak Unified School District
- NCES District ID: 0608190
- School code: 19-64378-6012116
- Principal: Dr. Jennifer Powell
- Grades: 7-8
- Enrollment: 1014 ((2018-2019))
- Colors: Blue and Gray
- Mascot: Roadrunner
- Communities served: Covina, Glendora, and San Dimas
- Website: royaloak.cousd.net

Royal Oak Middle School is the only middle school in the Charter Oak Unified School District and is located in the City of Covina, California, in the San Gabriel Valley, east of Los Angeles. Royal Oak was a 1996 California Distinguished School.

== History ==
Royal Oak Middle School opened in 1985 on the site of the former Royal Oak High School, which opened in 1965. Originally, the middle school served students in sixth through eighth grades. In 2007, the mission of the school changed to serve only seventh- and eighth-grade students.

== Special programs ==
- Advancement Via Individual Determination
- Accelerated Reader
- Accelerated Math
- Gifted and Talented Education
- Positive Behavior Interventions and Supports
- Project Lead the Way
- STEAM Academy

== Enrollment ==
Enrollment in the 2016–2017 school year is 712. The majority of students are Hispanic, with a large white minority and smaller minorities of African Americans and Asian Americans.

Ethnic composition of student body: 2016-17
	Percent
Hispanic or Latino	65.3%
American Indian or Alaska Native	1.0%
Asian	5.6%
Pacific Islander	0.1%
Filipino	1.7%
African American	2.5%
White	20.6%
Two or more Races	3.1%
