= San Dimas, California =

City in California, United States

- City
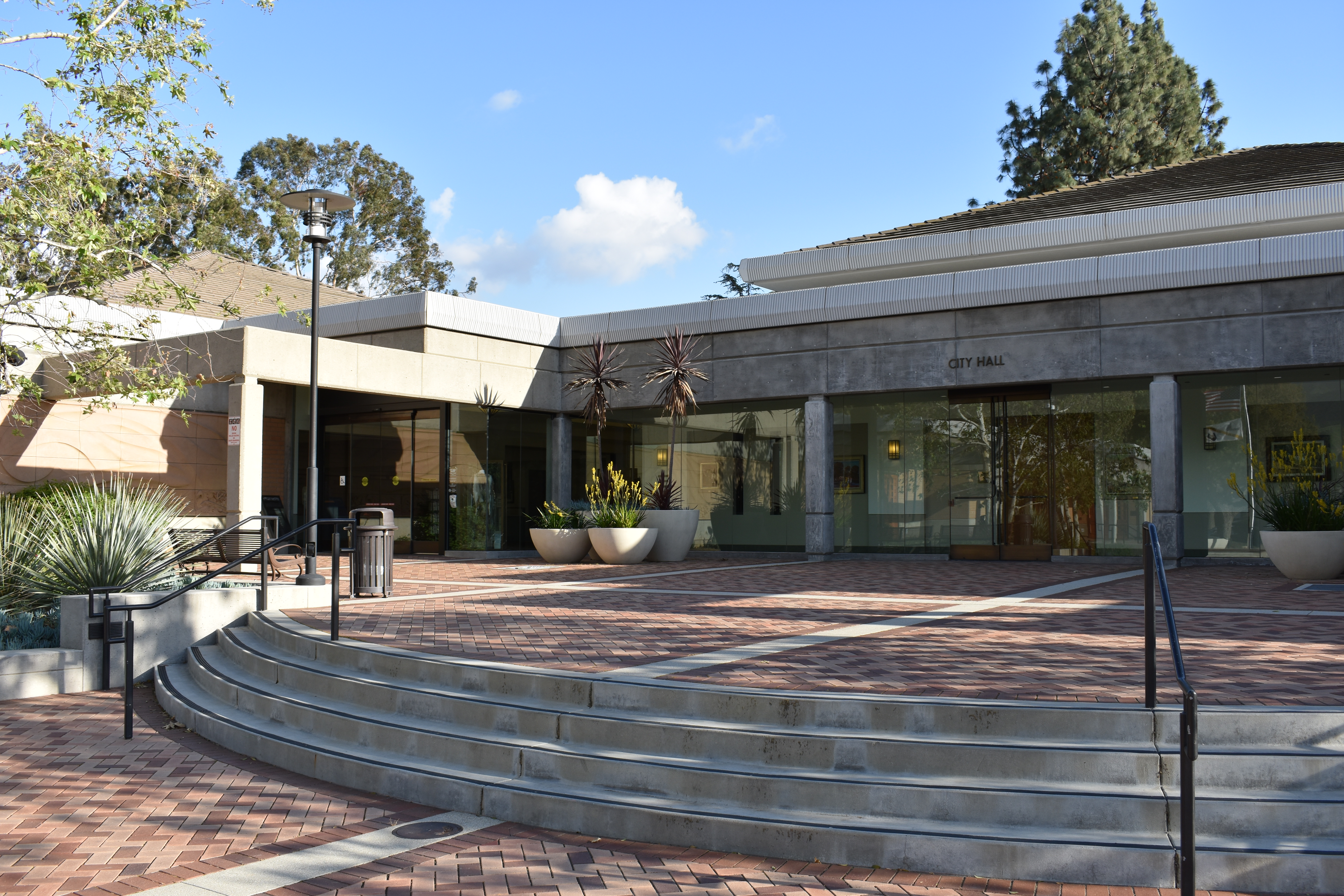
- City Hall (2017)

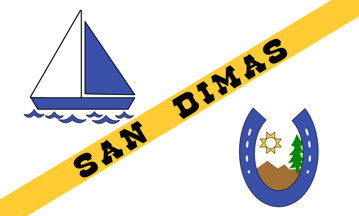
- Flag
- Interactive map of San Dimas, California
- Coordinates: 34°6′10″N 117°48′58″W
- Country: United States
- State: California
- County: Los Angeles
- Incorporated: August 4, 1960
- Named for: St. Dismas

Government
  - Type: City council/city manager
  - Mayor: Emmett Badar
  - City Manager: Brad McKinney

Area
  - Total: 15.42 sq mi (39.94 km^{2})
  - Land: 15.03 sq mi (38.93 km^{2})
  - Water: 0.39 sq mi (1.01 km^{2}) 2.53%
- Elevation: 955 ft (291 m)

Population (2020)
  - Total: 34,924
  - Estimate (2025): 32,978
  - Density: 2,320/sq mi (897/km^{2})
- Time zone: UTC−8 (PST)
  - Summer (DST): UTC−7 (PDT)
- ZIP Code: 91773
- Area code: 909
- FIPS code: 06-66070
- GNIS feature IDs: 1652785, 2411784
- Website: www.sandimasca.gov

San Dimas (Spanish for "Saint Dismas") is a city in the San Gabriel Valley of Los Angeles County, California, United States. At the 2020 census, its population was 34,924. It takes its name from San Dimas Canyon in the San Gabriel Mountains, north of the city.

San Dimas is bounded by the San Gabriel Mountains to the north, La Verne and Pomona to the east, Walnut and the unincorporated community of Walnut Islands to the south, and Glendora and Covina to the west. West San Dimas is an enclave within the city.

== History ==
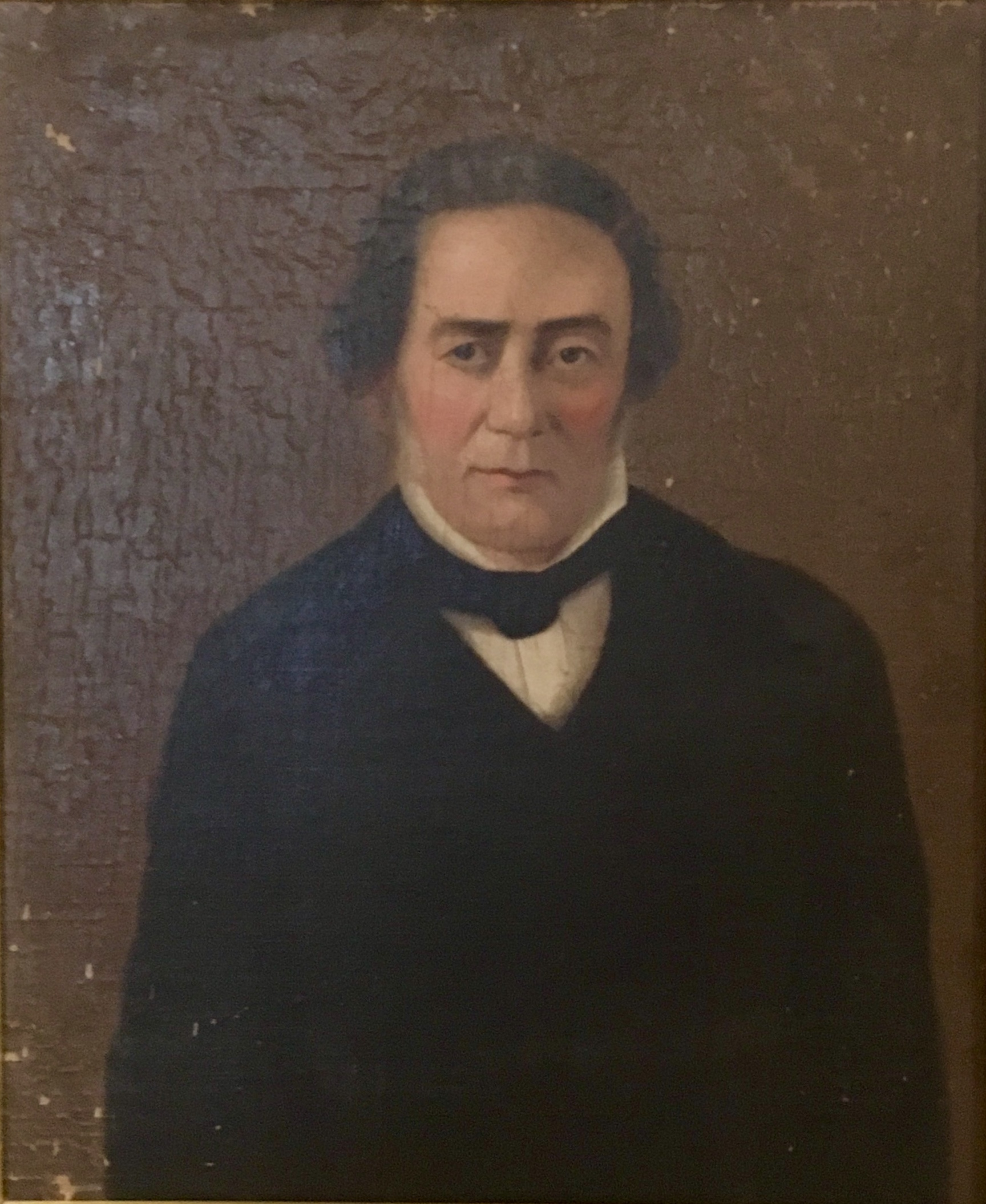
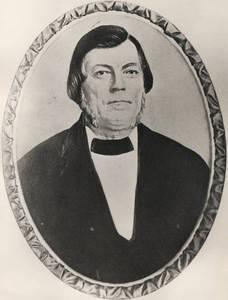
Rancho San José was granted in 1837 to Californio rancheros Ygnacio Palomares (left) and Ricardo Vejar (right), covering all of modern San Dimas.

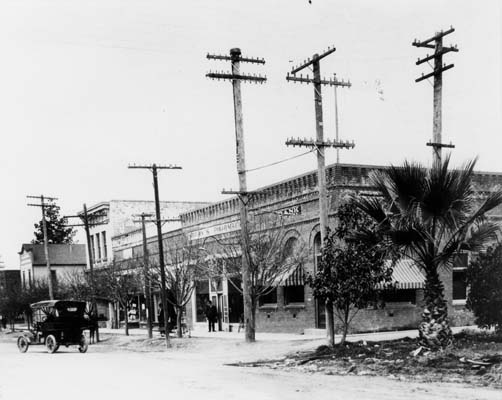
San Dimas, 1915

Tongva Indians occupied the area.

The first known European exploration of the area was in 1774, when Juan Bautista de Anza passed through on the first overland expedition of Las Californias, from New Spain-Mexico towards Monterey Bay. The area was originally developed in 1837 with the Mexican land grant from Governor Juan Bautista Alvarado to Ygnacio Palomares and Ricardo Vejar for the Rancho San Jose, then in Alta California. It later became known as La Cienega Mud Springs, so named because of local mud springs that created a riparian marsh and healing place. Palomares and Vejar conducted sheep and cattle operations on Rancho San Jose, also growing crops for consumption by the residents of the rancho. In the early 1860s, a severe drought decimated the ranch's population of sheep and cattle. Ygnacio Palomares died in 1864, and his widow began selling the ranch land in 1865. Vejar lost his share by foreclosure to two Los Angeles merchants, Isaac Schlesinger and Hyman Tischler, in 1864. In 1866, Schlesinger and Tischler sold the ranch to Louis Phillips.

The arrival of the Los Angeles and San Gabriel Valley Railroad in 1887, later purchased by Santa Fe Railroad, led to La Cienega Mud Springs being first mapped. The ensuing land boom resulted in the formation of the San Jose Ranch Company, which first laid out streets. Small businesses began to open soon thereafter, and the city took on a new name: San Dimas. Growth was rapid, and San Dimas soon became an agricultural community. Oranges were the major crop and business in San Dimas until the mid-20th century.

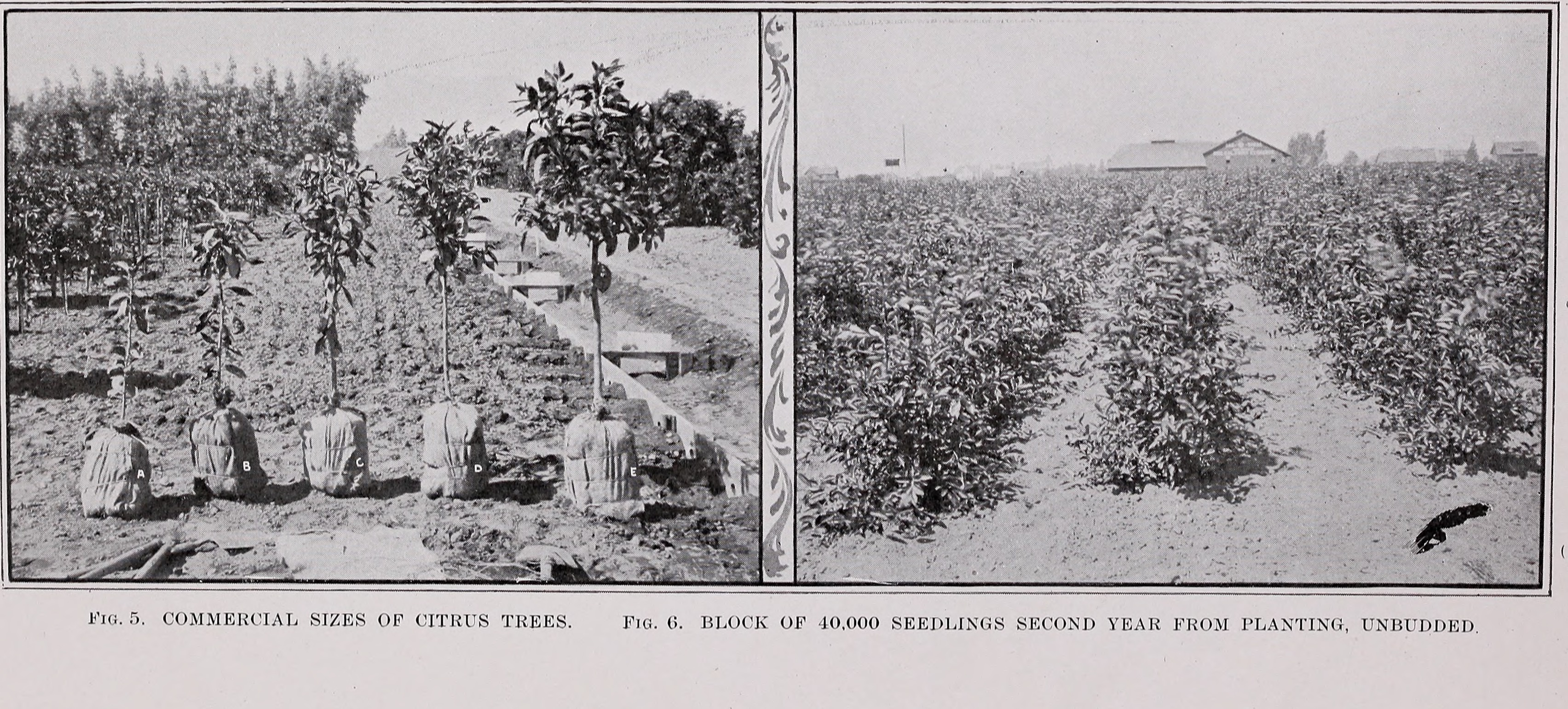
San Dimas citrus nurseries, c. 1902

San Dimas incorporated as a city in 1960, and is now known for its Western art. In the 1990s, San Dimas was also host to the Miss Rodeo California State Pageant, run by A. F. "Shorty" Feldbush and various other city volunteers. The week-long pageant was held in conjunction with the city's Western Days and Rodeo, until the pageant moved to its new home in central California.

In 1971, the San Dimas Golf Course was purchased. In 1972, San Dimas Community Hospital opened its 92-bed facility. In 1981, the San Dimas Swim and Racquet Club was built next to San Dimas High School, according to the San Dimas Historical Society.

== Geography ==
San Dimas is a suburb of Los Angeles County nestled along the foothills of the San Gabriel Mountains, approximately 28 miles (45 km) east/northeast of downtown Los Angeles and north of the Pacific Ocean. According to the United States Census Bureau, the city has a total area of 15.4 sq mi (40 km^{2}), of which 0.39 sq mi (1.0 km^{2}) is covered by water. Cinnamon Creek crosses the city, roughly parallel to the Arrow Highway, before reaching Cinnamon Falls near San Dimas Avenue.

San Dimas runs along and southward from historic U.S. Route 66, another part of its development in the earlier 20th century. Other major arteries include Arrow Highway (east–west) and San Dimas Avenue (north–south). The Foothill Freeway (I-210) connects the city to Pasadena and the San Fernando Valley, with California State Route 57 connecting to Orange County and the beaches.

=== Climate ===
This region experiences hot and dry summers, with no average monthly temperatures above 71.6 °F (22.0 °C). According to the Köppen climate classification, San Dimas has a warm-summer Mediterranean climate, Csb on climate maps.

== Demographics ==
Historical population
Census	Pop.	Note	%±
1970	15,692		—
1980	24,014		53.0%
1990	32,397		34.9%
2000	34,980		8.0%
2010	33,371		−4.6%
2020	34,924		4.7%
2024 (est.)	33,226	▼	−4.9%
U.S. Decennial Census; 1860–1870 1880–1890; 1900 1910 1920; 1930 1940 1950; 1960 1970 1980; 1990 2000 2010; 2020

San Dimas first appeared as a city in the 1970 U.S. census part of the East San Gabriel Valley census county division (CCD).

=== Racial and ethnic composition ===
San Dimas city, California – Racial and ethnic composition Note: the US Census treats Hispanic/Latino as an ethnic category. This table excludes Latinos from the racial categories and assigns them to a separate category. Hispanics/Latinos may be of any race.
Race / Ethnicity (NH = Non-Hispanic)	Pop 1980	Pop 1990	Pop 2000	Pop 2010	Pop 2020	% 1980	% 1990	% 2000	% 2010	% 2020
White alone (NH)	18,774	22,746	21,381	17,448	14,275	78.18%	70.21%	61.12%	52.28%	40.87%
Black or African American alone (NH)	959	1,182	1,114	1,015	1,200	3.99%	3.65%	3.18%	3.04%	3.44%
Native American or Alaska Native alone (NH)	156	128	117	77	89	0.65%	0.40%	0.33%	0.23%	0.25%
Asian alone (NH)	900	2,682	3,216	3,381	4,868	3.75%	8.28%	9.19%	10.13%	13.94%
Native Hawaiian or Pacific Islander alone (NH)	900	2,682	63	36	26	3.75%	8.28%	0.18%	0.11%	0.07%
Other race alone (NH)	89	47	53	61	196	0.37%	0.15%	0.15%	0.18%	0.56%
Mixed race or Multiracial (NH)	x	x	873	862	1,325	x	x	2.50%	2.58%	3.79%
Hispanic or Latino (any race)	3,136	5,612	8,163	10,491	12,945	13.06%	17.32%	23.34%	31.44%	37.07%
Total	24,014	32,397	34,980	33,371	34,924	100.00%	100.00%	100.00%	100.00%	100.00%

=== 2020 census ===
As of the 2020 census, San Dimas had a population of 34,924. The median age was 43.7 years. 19.2% of residents were under the age of 18 and 20.8% were 65 years of age or older. For every 100 females, there were 90.5 males, and for every 100 females age 18 and over, there were 87.9 males.

100.0% of residents lived in urban areas, while 0.0% lived in rural areas.

There were 12,553 households in San Dimas, of which 30.6% had children under the age of 18 living in them. Of all households, 53.7% were married-couple households, 14.4% were households with a male householder and no spouse or partner present, and 26.9% were households with a female householder and no spouse or partner present. About 21.9% of all households were made up of individuals and 12.5% had someone living alone who was 65 years of age or older.

There were 13,033 housing units, of which 3.7% were vacant. The homeowner vacancy rate was 0.7% and the rental vacancy rate was 4.7%.

=== 2010 census ===
The 2010 United States census reported that San Dimas had a population of 33,371. The population density was 2,163.1 inhabitants per square mile (835.2/km^{2}). The racial makeup of San Dimas was 24,038 (72.0%) White with 52.3% being non-Hispanic white, 1,084 (3.2%) African American, 233 (0.7%) Native American, 3,496 (10.5%) Asian, 48 (0.1%) Pacific Islander, 2,828 (8.5%) from other races, and 1,644 (4.9%) from two or more races. Hispanics or Latinos of any race were 10,491 persons (31.4%).

The census reported that 32,831 people (98.4% of the population) lived in households, 320 (1.0%) lived in noninstitutionalized group quarters, and 220 (0.7%) were institutionalized.

Of the 12,030 households, 32.2% had children under the age of 18 living in them, 54.9% were opposite-sex married couples living together, 12.2% had a female householder with no husband present, 5.1% had a male householder with no wife present, 4.5% were unmarried opposite-sex partnerships, and 91 (0.8%) same-sex married couples or partnerships. About 22.2% were made up of individuals, and 10.6% had someone living alone who was 65 years of age or older. The average household size was 2.73. Families comprised 72.1% of all households; the average family size was 3.19.

The population was distributed as 20.9% under the age of 18, 9.8% aged 18 to 24, 22.6% aged 25 to 44, 31.1% aged 45 to 64, and 15.5% who were 65 years of age or older. The median age was 42.6 years. For every 100 females, there were 90.5 males. For every 100 females age 18 and over, there were 86.8 males.

Of the 12,506 housing units, at an average density of 810.6 per square mile (313.0/km^{2}), 72.8% were owner-occupied, and 3,273 (27.2%) were occupied by renters. The homeowner vacancy rate was 1.1%; the rental vacancy rate was 5.6%. About 73.4% of the population lived in owner-occupied housing units and 25.0% lived in rental housing units.

According to the 2010 United States census, San Dimas had a median household income of $78,685, with 6.6% of the population living below the federal poverty line.

=== 2000 census ===
As of the census of 2000, 34,980 people, 12,163 households, and 8,988 families were residing in the city. The population density was 2,255.7 people/sq mi (870.8/km^{2}). The 12,503 housing units averaged 806.3/sq mi (311.2/km^{2}). The racial makeup of the city was 74.66% White, 3.30% African American, 0.69% Native American, 9.39% Asian, 0.21% Pacific Islander, 7.34% from other races, and 4.39% from two or more races. About 23.34% of the population were Hispanics or Latinos of any race.

Of the 12,163 households, 35.5% had children under 18 living with them, 57.7% were married couples living together, 11.6% had a female householder with no husband present, and 26.1% were not families. About 21.0% of all households were made up of individuals, and 8.7% had someone living alone who was 65 or older. The average household size was 2.78, and the average family size was 3.23.

In the city, the age distribution was 25.5% under 18, 8.9% from 18 to 24, 28.1% from 25 to 44, 25.5% from 45 to 64, and 11.9% who were 65 or older. The median age was 37 years. For every 100 females, there were 92.2 males. For every 100 females age 18 and over, there were 87.2 males.

The median income for a household in the city was $62,885, and for a family was $72,124. Males had a median income of $53,009 versus $36,057 for females. The per capita income for the city was $28,321. 6.3% of the population and 3.6% of families were below the poverty line. Of the total population, 5.9% of those under the age of 18 and 11.5% of those 65 and older were living below the poverty line.

According to Mapping L.A., Mexican (16.4%) and German (9.4%) were the most common ancestries. Mexico (21.0%) and the Philippines (8.6%) were the most common foreign places of birth.

== Local features ==
=== Attractions ===
- Raging Waters Los Angeles, California's largest water park
- The Pacific Railroad Museum, a museum and library in the former ATSF San Dimas Depot on Bonita Ave., operated by the Pacific Railroad Society
- Frank G. Bonelli Regional Park
- San Dimas Dog Park
- San Dimas Canyon Natural Area and Nature Center - The San Dimas Canyon Nature Center was the first nature center in the Los Angeles County Park system opened in the 1950s. For decades, nature enthusiasts have come to discover the center’s unique artifacts, fun facts about the native animals, and learn exciting information about the area and its rich history.

=== Businesses ===
- Headquarters of Magellan Navigation, a pioneer in the global positioning system industry
- Headquarters of Curative, a healthcare startup known for its scalable COVID-19 testing and COVID-19 vaccinations during the COVID-19 pandemic

== Government ==
In the California State Legislature, San Dimas is in the 22nd senatorial district, represented by Democrat Susan Rubio, and in the 41st Assembly district, represented by Democrat John Harabedian.

In the United States House of Representatives, San Dimas is in California's 31st congressional district, represented by Democrat Gil Cisneros.

== Education ==
The majority of the city lies within the Bonita Unified School District and students attend San Dimas High School. Students living in the Via Verde neighborhood south of Puente Avenue and along San Dimas Avenue attend South Hills High School in the Covina-Valley Unified School District. Small numbers of students attend school in Charter Oak Unified School District. The city is also home to Life Pacific College, which is affiliated with the International Church of the Foursquare Gospel, offering undergraduate and graduate degrees.

== Infrastructure ==
=== Transportation ===
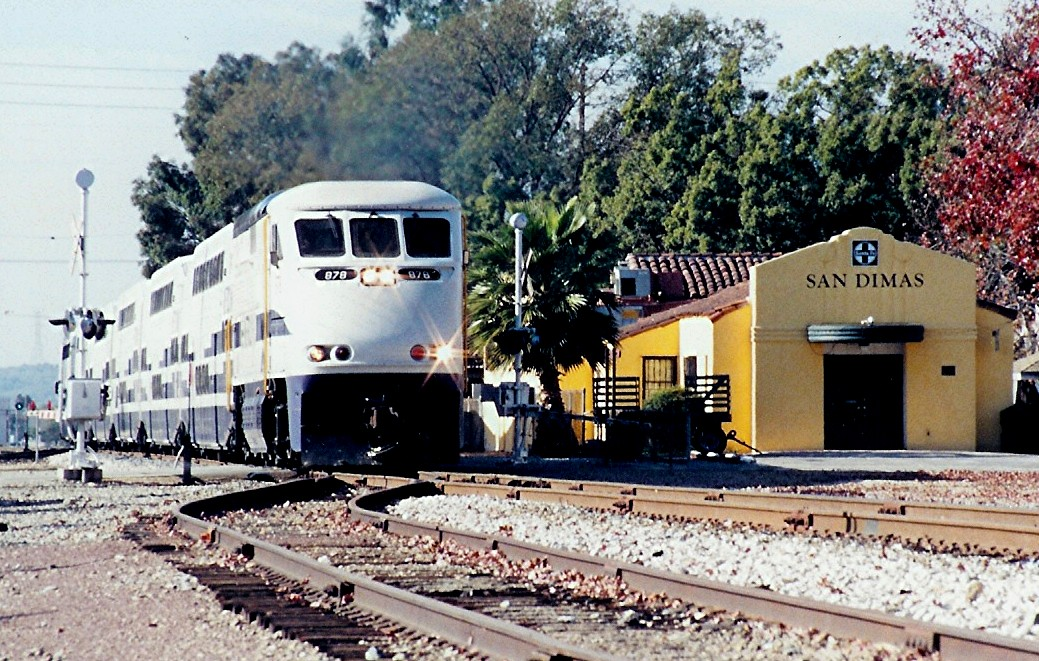
Metrolink San Dimas

The Los Angeles Metro Rail A Line was extended east from its current terminus in Azusa to Pomona. The extended line includes the San Dimas station which opened on September 19, 2025.

=== Law enforcement ===
The Los Angeles County Sheriff's Department provides law enforcement services for the city of San Dimas and operates the San Dimas Station.

=== Fire department ===
The Los Angeles County Fire Department provides fire protection services for the city of San Dimas.

=== Health care ===
The Los Angeles County Department of Health Services operates the Pomona Health Center in Pomona, serving most of San Dimas. Some portions of San Dimas are served by the Monrovia Health Center in Monrovia.

== Notable people ==
The following individuals are either notable current or former residents of San Dimas (R), were born or raised in San Dimas in their early years (B), or otherwise have a significant connection to the history of the San Dimas area (C).

- Ewell Blackwell, baseball player, Cincinnati Reds (B)
- Shannan Click, fashion model (B)
- Jamie Dantzscher, gymnast in the 2000 Olympics in Sydney for the U.S. Olympic Team (B)
- Bill Dwyre, columnist for Los Angeles Times (R)
- D.J. Hackett, wide receiver most recently with the Carolina Panthers (B)
- Ashley Hatch, soccer player for the United States national team (B)
- Christian Jimenez, soccer player, Real Salt Lake of Major League Soccer (B)
- Ian Johnson, football player, Detroit Lions (B)
- Derek Klena, actor best known for Anastasia, Dogfight, and Jagged Little Pill (B)
- Peter Lambert, baseball player, Colorado Rockies (B)
- Lela Lee, actress and comic book writer (B)
- Alex Morgan, soccer player for the United States national team (B)
- Wayne Moses, football coach for the St. Louis Rams, USC, UCLA, Washington, Stanford, Pitt, San Diego State and New Mexico (B)
- Bre Payton, writer for The Federalist (B)
- Chris Pettit, baseball player, Los Angeles Angels of Anaheim and Los Angeles Dodgers (B)
- P. J. Pilittere, Major League Baseball coach of Colorado Rockies (B)
- Brett Pill, Major League Baseball player, San Francisco Giants (B)
- Jeremy Reed, baseball player, New York Mets (B)
- Esther Snyder, co-founder of In-N-Out Burger (R)
- Guy Snyder, former president of In-N-Out Burger (B)
- Harry Snyder, co-founder of In-N-Out Burger (R)
- Lynsi Snyder, owner of In-N-Out Burger (B)
- Rich Snyder, former president of In-N-Out Burger (B)
- J. J. Spaun, professional golfer (B)
- Horace Jeremiah "Jerry" Voorhis, U.S. Representative and founder of Voorhis School for Boys (C)
- Adam Wylie, actor best known for television series Picket Fences (B)

=== In popular culture ===
From the Bill & Ted franchise:

- William "Bill" S. Preston, Esq., San Dimas High School student and time traveler.
- Theodore "Ted" Logan, San Dimas High School student and time traveler.

== See also ==
- San Dimas Hotel
