= Charter Oak, California =

- Unincorporated community Census designated place
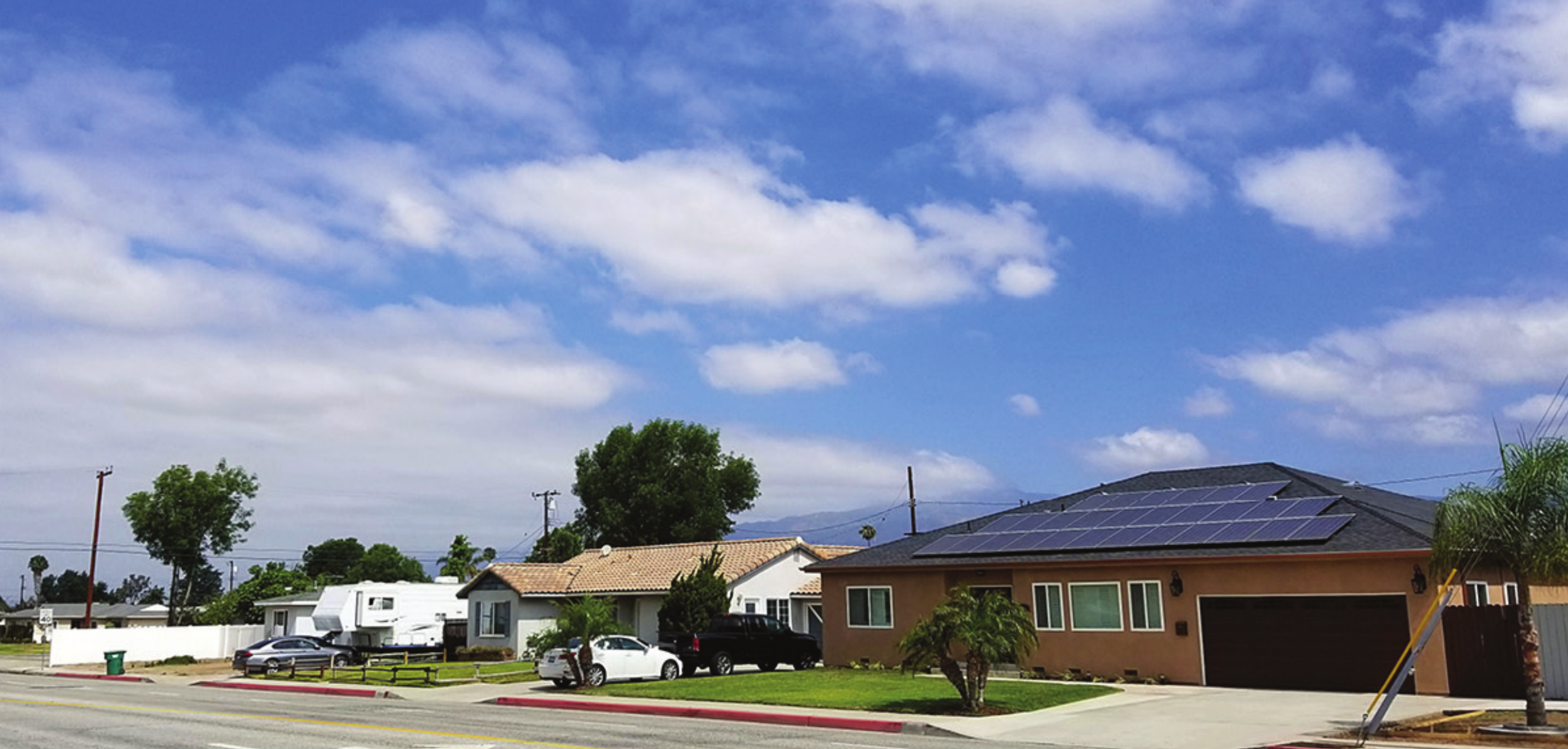

- Location of Charter Oak in Los Angeles County, California.

- Location in the United States
- Coordinates: 34°6′5″N 117°51′28″W
- Country: United States
- State: California
- County: Los Angeles

Area
  - Total: 0.93 sq mi (2.40 km^{2})
  - Land: 0.93 sq mi (2.40 km^{2})
  - Water: 0 sq mi (0.00 km^{2}) 0%
- Elevation: 761 ft (232 m)

Population (2020)
  - Total: 9,739
  - Density: 10,497.2/sq mi (4,052.99/km^{2})
- Time zone: UTC-8 (Pacific)
  - Summer (DST): UTC-7 (PDT)
- ZIP code: 91724
- Area code: 626
- FIPS code: 06-12734
- GNIS feature ID: 1660472

Charter Oak is an unincorporated community and census-designated place (CDP) in the San Gabriel Valley of Los Angeles County, California, United States, approximately 26 miles (42 km) east of downtown Los Angeles. The population was 9,739 at the 2020 census, up from 9,310 at the 2010 census.

Charter Oak is located in the eastern San Gabriel Valley, situated along Arrow Highway between Covina to the south and west, Glendora to the north and San Dimas to the east. Residents tend to refer to the CDP portion as the "unincorporated part of Covina", or simply as "Covina".

Originally a small agricultural settlement (primarily citrus orchards) centered on the intersection of Arrow Highway and Bonnie Cove Avenue, population growth greatly expanded the area recognized as "Charter Oak". In the 1960s, it evolved into a "bedroom community" suburb of Los Angeles and commercial agriculture is nearly gone.

Today, the generally accepted boundaries of historical Charter Oak are I-210 to the north, Valley Center Avenue to the east, Covina Hills Road to the south and Grand Avenue to the west, corresponding to the boundaries of Charter Oak Unified School District. However, the actual CDP area is notably smaller in the present day. This places a large part of the area historically and colloquially known as Charter Oak within the modern-day city limits of Covina and Glendora.

== Geography ==
Charter Oak is located at 34°6′5″N 117°51′28″W (34.101308, -117.857656).

Charter Oak is primarily flat ground, though the South Hills of Glendora form much of the northern border, and there is a small valley in the southeastern quadrant, with Walnut Creek flowing in the bottom. The other major water feature in Charter Oak is the San Dimas Wash, a concrete-lined flood control channel which was formerly the San Dimas River, a tributary of the San Gabriel River. Both Walnut Creek and San Dimas wash flow from east-northeast toward west-southwest, the wash in Glendora and the creek in Covina.

The ground is described as "dry riverbed," with sandy soil which was suitable not only for the citrus orchards which once were the primary industry in the area, but also for several nurseries growing cacti and other small plants.

According to the United States Census Bureau, the CDP has a total area of 2.4 square kilometers (0.9 mi^{2}), all land.

== History of Charter Oak ==
=== Early inhabitants and Rancho era (Pre-1880s) ===
The area that became Charter Oak was originally inhabited by the Tongva (Gabrielino) people, who had lived in the San Gabriel Valley for thousands of years before European contact. During the Spanish and Mexican periods, this region was part of expansive land grants known as ranchos, notably Rancho La Puente (granted to John A. Rowland and William Workman in 1842) and Rancho Azusa de Dalton (acquired by Englishman Henry Dalton in 1844). Following the Mexican-American War and the incorporation of California into the United States, these large ranchos were gradually subdivided, paving the way for American settlers and agriculture in the late 19th century.

=== Origin of "Charter Oak" name and early settlement ===
Following the Mexican–American War and California's transition to American rule, the area attracted settlers due to its fertile land and water availability. The community of Charter Oak emerged during the 1850s, primarily focusing on agriculture, particularly citrus cultivation. The area was named after a large oak tree which stood prominently and became a local landmark.

There are two versions of how Charter Oak received its name. According to the historically documented account, American soldiers camped in the area during the Mexican–American War associated the large oak tree with Connecticut's famous Charter Oak, where colonists once hid their charter from English authorities, hence giving the tree its name. A local legend provides an extended version of the story involving a Californio rancher, Don Antonio, who purportedly buried gold beneath the oak tree to hide it from American troops, hiding and watching from the tree above as they passed by. According to the story, he fled after the troops left, leaving his gold behind - an alluring forgotten treasure that later prompted many to dig near the tree. This folklore remains cherished part of the community's oral tradition.

=== Railroad bypass and Glendora's rise (1880s) ===
The establishment of railroads significantly influenced local growth. In 1887, George Dexter Whitcomb, the founder of nearby Glendora, successfully used his connections in the railroad industry to lobby for the Atchison, Topeka and Santa Fe Railway (originally the Los Angeles and San Gabriel Valley Railroad) to run north of the South Hills, diverting the railway away from its originally planned route through Charter Oak. This effort led to healthy economic and residential growth in Glendora, while Charter Oak, lacking a direct railway connection, remained largely agricultural.

=== Charter Oak School and community growth ===
In 1894, residents established the Charter Oak School District to provide local education for the area's growing population. Initially operating from a single-room tent, the school soon expanded into a permanent wooden structure and later into a larger, mission-style building in 1922. This institution became a defining element of the Charter Oak community identity.

=== Postwar suburbanization and annexations ===
Following World War II, Charter Oak transitioned rapidly from a rural, agricultural community into a suburban neighborhood, as citrus orchards gave way to residential subdivisions. Portions of Charter Oak were annexed by neighboring cities Covina (areas south of Arrow Highway) and Glendora (areas north of Arrow Highway), significantly reducing the size of the unincorporated area.

== Education and culture ==
Most of the census-designated place is served by the Charter Oak Unified School District, while a portion is in Covina-Valley Unified School District The boundaries of the Charter Oak Unified School District, formed in areas which were at the time unincorporated area, eventually became the accepted boundaries of historical Charter Oak, attesting to the importance of the district in the community. There are also private schools in the area.

Community college students from Charter Oak generally attend Citrus College in Glendora or Mount San Antonio College ("Mount SAC") in Walnut.

Charter Oak Gymnastics has been a U.S. National Team training center since 1989, and has produced many elite athletes, including national champion Vanessa Atler and Olympian Jamie Dantzscher.

== Demographics ==
Historical population
Census	Pop.	Note	%±
1980	6,840		—
1990	8,858		29.5%
2000	9,027		1.9%
2010	9,310		3.1%
2020	9,739		4.6%
U.S. Decennial Census; 1860–1870 1880-1890; 1900 1910 1920; 1930 1940 1950; 1960 1970 1980; 1990 2000 2010; 2020

Charter Oak first appeared as a census designated place in the 1980 United States census as part of the East San Gabriel Valley census county division.

=== Racial and ethnic composition ===
Charter Oak CDP, California – Racial and ethnic composition Note: the US Census treats Hispanic/Latino as an ethnic category. This table excludes Latinos from the racial categories and assigns them to a separate category. Hispanics/Latinos may be of any race.
Race / Ethnicity (NH = Non-Hispanic)	Pop 1980	Pop 1990	Pop 2000	Pop 2010	Pop 2020	% 1980	% 1990	% 2000	% 2010	% 2020
White alone (NH)	5,654	5,769	4,172	3,169	2,277	82.66%	65.13%	46.22%	34.04%	23.38%
Black or African American alone (NH)	65	371	398	369	379	0.95%	4.19%	4.41%	3.96%	3.89%
Native American or Alaska Native alone (NH)	77	49	56	32	34	1.13%	0.55%	0.62%	0.34%	0.35%
Asian alone (NH)	204	633	817	975	1,113	2.98%	7.15%	9.05%	10.47%	11.43%
Native Hawaiian or Pacific Islander alone (NH)	204	633	9	14	14	2.98%	7.15%	0.10%	0.15%	0.14%
Other race alone (NH)	29	26	10	28	44	0.42%	0.29%	0.11%	0.30%	0.45%
Mixed race or Multiracial (NH)	x	x	263	177	278	x	x	2.91%	1.90%	2.85%
Hispanic or Latino (any race)	811	2,010	3,302	4,546	5,600	11.86%	22.69%	36.58%	48.83%	57.50%
Total	6,840	8,858	9,027	9,310	9,739	100.00%	100.00%	100.00%	100.00%	100.00%

=== 2020 census ===
As of the 2020 census, Charter Oak had a population of 9,739 and a population density of 10,494.6 inhabitants per square mile (4,052.0/km^{2}). The age distribution was 21.4% under the age of 18, 10.3% aged 18 to 24, 27.7% aged 25 to 44, 26.6% aged 45 to 64, and 14.0% who were 65 years of age or older. The median age was 38.1 years. For every 100 females, there were 94.5 males, and for every 100 females age 18 and over there were 89.3 males age 18 and over.

The racial makeup of Charter Oak was 34.8% White, 4.4% African American, 2.5% Native American, 11.8% Asian, 0.2% Pacific Islander, 26.8% from other races, and 19.5% from two or more races. Hispanic or Latino of any race were 57.5% of the population.

The census reported that 99.4% of the population lived in households, 0.6% lived in non-institutionalized group quarters, and no one was institutionalized. 100.0% of residents lived in urban areas, while 0.0% lived in rural areas.

There were 3,152 households, out of which 36.6% included children under the age of 18. Of all households, 46.8% were married-couple households, 6.9% were cohabiting couple households, 29.7% had a female householder with no partner present, and 16.6% had a male householder with no partner present. 17.9% of households were one person, and 8.2% were one person aged 65 or older. The average household size was 3.07. There were 2,406 families (76.3% of all households).

There were 3,231 housing units at an average density of 3,481.7 units per square mile (1,344.3 units/km^{2}), of which 3,152 (97.6%) were occupied. Of these, 63.0% were owner-occupied, and 37.0% were occupied by renters. The homeowner vacancy rate was 1.0%, and the rental vacancy rate was 2.8%.

=== Income and poverty ===
In 2023, the US Census Bureau estimated that the median household income was $84,101, and the per capita income was $37,887. About 7.6% of families and 10.4% of the population were below the poverty line.

=== 2010 census ===
At the 2010 census Charter Oak had a population of 9,310. The population density was 10,034.6 inhabitants per square mile (3,874.4/km^{2}). The racial makeup of Charter Oak was 5,602 (60.2%) White (34.0% Non-Hispanic White), 405 (4.4%) African American, 85 (0.9%) Native American, 1,035 (11.1%) Asian, 18 (0.2%) Pacific Islander, 1,693 (18.2%) from other races, and 472 (5.1%) from two or more races. Hispanic or Latino of any race were 4,546 persons (48.8%).

The census reported that 9,178 people (98.6% of the population) lived in households, 132 (1.4%) lived in non-institutionalized group quarters, and no one was institutionalized.

There were 3,044 households, 1,264 (41.5%) had children under the age of 18 living in them, 1,486 (48.8%) were opposite-sex married couples living together, 553 (18.2%) had a female householder with no husband present, 226 (7.4%) had a male householder with no wife present. There were 188 (6.2%) unmarried opposite-sex partnerships, and 19 (0.6%) same-sex married couples or partnerships. 601 households (19.7%) were one person and 203 (6.7%) had someone living alone who was 65 or older. The average household size was 3.02. There were 2,265 families (74.4% of households); the average family size was 3.47.

The age distribution was 2,352 people (25.3%) under the age of 18, 990 people (10.6%) aged 18 to 24, 2,601 people (27.9%) aged 25 to 44, 2,446 people (26.3%) aged 45 to 64, and 921 people (9.9%) who were 65 or older. The median age was 35.4 years. For every 100 females, there were 94.6 males. For every 100 females age 18 and over, there were 90.7 males.

There were 3,144 housing units at an average density of 3,388.7 per square mile, of the occupied units 1,998 (65.6%) were owner-occupied and 1,046 (34.4%) were rented. The homeowner vacancy rate was 1.5%; the rental vacancy rate was 4.0%. 6,168 people (66.3% of the population) lived in owner-occupied housing units and 3,010 people (32.3%) lived in rental housing units.

According to the 2010 United States Census, Charter Oak had a median household income of $68,597, with 8.3% of the population living below the federal poverty line.

== Government ==
In the California State Legislature, Charter Oak is in the 22nd senatorial district, represented by Democrat Susan Rubio, and in the 48th Assembly district, represented by Democrat Blanca Rubio.

In the United States House of Representatives, Charter Oak is in California's 31st congressional district, represented by Democrat Gil Cisneros.
