= Chi Mui =

Asian-American mayor (died 2006)

Chi Mui (September 25 or October 26, 1952 – April 27, 2006) was the first Asian-American mayor of San Gabriel, California. He graduated cum laude with a Bachelor's Degree in civil engineering from Polytechnic University of New York in 1980. The San Gabriel post office is named after him.

== Career ==
Mui was a field representative for Lucille Roybal-Allard.

Mui was the mayor of San Gabriel.

== Personal life ==
Chi Mui was born in China in 1952, and moved with his parents to the United States in 1963.

In 1980, Mui moved to Southern California.

On April 27, 2006, Mui died from liver cancer, three months after becoming mayor.

== Legacy ==
- Chi Mui Post Office located at 120 S. Del Mar Ave., San Gabriel, California.
