= West San Dimas, California =

Unincorporated community in California, United States

- Unincorporated community
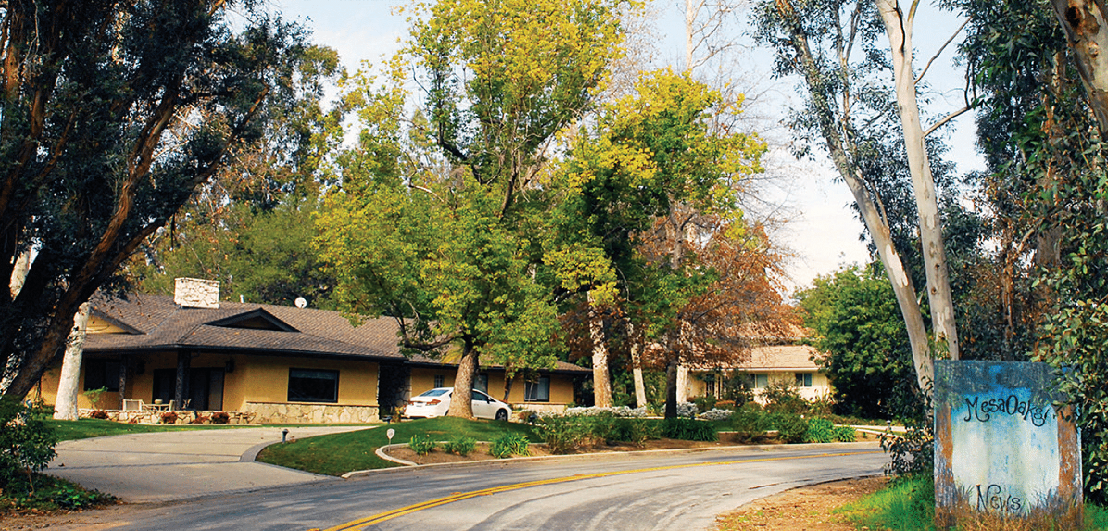

- Location in the United States West San Dimas, California (the United States)
- Coordinates: 34°5′12″N 117°50′18″W
- Country: United States
- State: California
- County: Los Angeles

Area
  - Total: 0.33 sq mi (0.85 km^{2})

Population (2000)
  - Total: 309
  - Density: 937/sq mi (362/km^{2})
- Time zone: UTC-8 (PST)
  - Summer (DST): UTC-7 (PDT)
- ZIP code: 91724, 91773
- Area codes: 626, 909

West San Dimas, also known as Mesa Oaks, is an unincorporated community in the eastern part of Los Angeles County in the U.S. state of California. The population was 309 according to the 2000 census. Locally, the area is known as "unincorporated Covina" and "unincorporated San Dimas". The area is an enclave of San Dimas, being located in the southwestern portion of the city. Covina is the city name for home addresses in the area, even though the area is unincorporated.

== Geography ==
West San Dimas has a total area of 0.33 square miles.

== Demographics ==
=== 2000 ===
There were 309 people living in West San Dimas, according to the US Census. The population density was 937 inhabitants per square mile. The racial makeup of the area was 59.5% White, 19.9% Latino, 15.5% Asian, 2.9% African American, and 2.2% from other races. The average household size was 2.8. The age distribution was 14.9% 10 and under, 10.7% from 11 to 18, 13.9% from 19 to 34, 27.8% from 35 to 49, 22.3% from 50 to 64, and 10.4% 65 or older. The median age was 41 years. The median household income was $125,984. (in 2008 dollars)

== Economy ==
=== Employers ===
There is no commercial land in West San Dimas. However, there are institutions within the area that employ people, such as Walnut Creek Regional Park and the national headquarters of Tzu Chi USA.

== Government and infrastructure ==
=== Education ===
The area is mostly served by Charter Oak Unified School District, with students in the area attending Badillo Elementary School, Royal Oak Middle School, and Charter Oak High School.
