= Oxford School =

Oxford School may refer to:

- Oxford Franciscan school, 12th century philosophical movement that include Robert Grosseteste, Roger Bacon, Duns Scotus and William of Ockham
- Ecole Oxford School, Halifax, Canada
- Oxford Community School, England, United Kingdom
- Oxford Spires Academy, England, United Kingdom
- Oxford Schools, Amman, Jordan
- Oxford School (Rowland Heights, California)
- The Oxford School, Panama City, Panama

== See also ==
- University of Oxford, England, United Kingdom
- Oxford College (disambiguation)
- Oxford High School (disambiguation)
- Oxford Academy (disambiguation)
- Oxford University (disambiguation)
