= John Zhang =

John Zhang may refer to:

- John J. Zhang, medical scientist who made important contributions in fertility research
- John X. J. Zhang, Chinese-American engineer
- Xinlei "John" Zhang, an adult perpetrator in the 2015 Rowland Heights, California bullying incident
