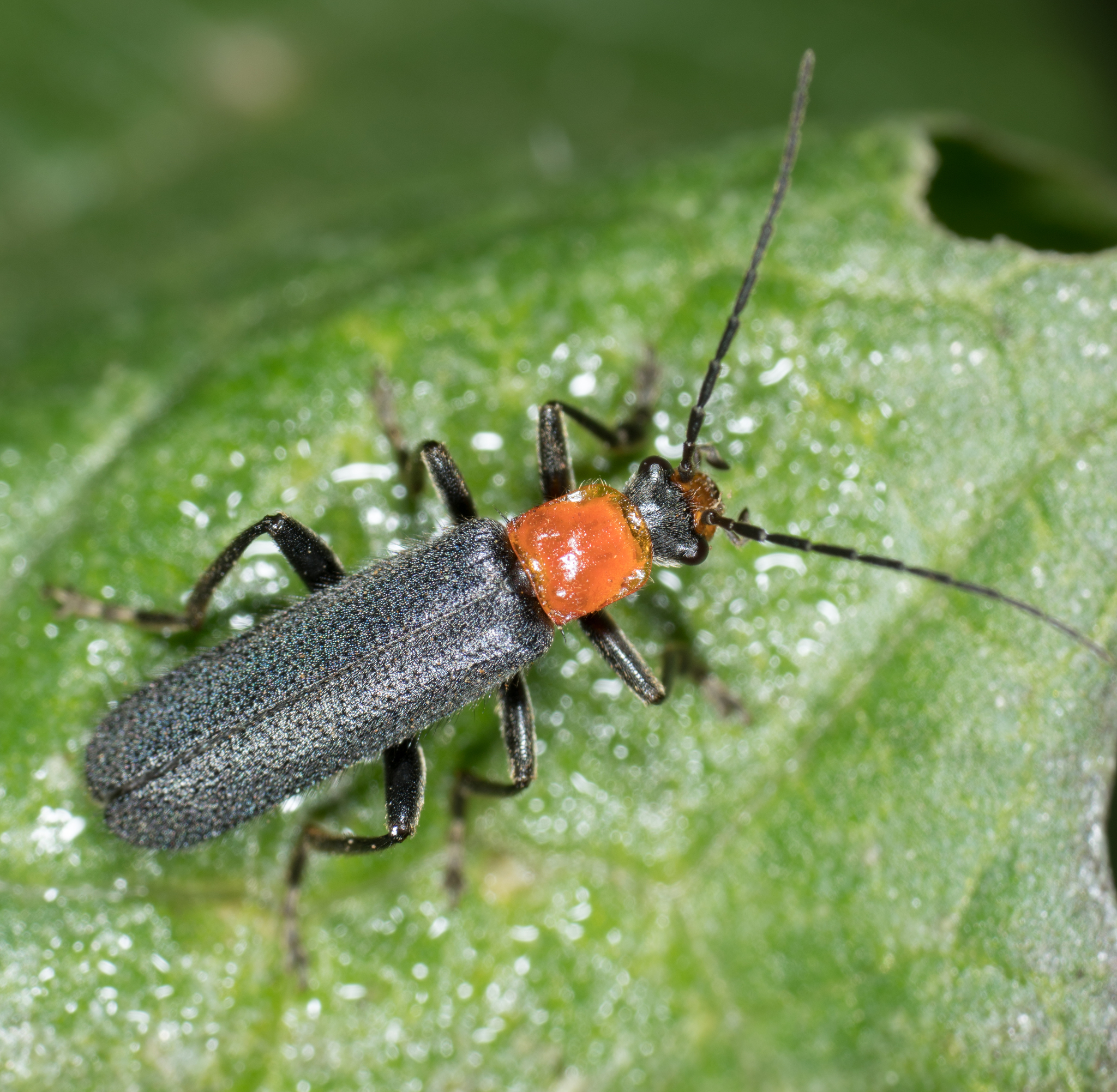
- Puente Hills, California (2017)

Scientific classification
- Kingdom: Animalia
- Phylum: Arthropoda
- Clade: Pancrustacea
- Class: Insecta
- Order: Coleoptera
- Suborder: Polyphaga
- Infraorder: Elateriformia
- Family: Cantharidae
- Genus: Cultellunguis
- Species: C. ingenuus

Binomial name
- Cultellunguis ingenuus (LeConte, 1881)

= Cultellunguis ingenuus =

Species of beetle

Cultellunguis ingenuus is a species of soldier beetle in the family Cantharidae. It is found in North America.
