= Williams family murders =

2007 familicide in California

- Location: Rowland Heights, California, US
- Date: August 7–8, 2007
- Attack type: Familicide; mass murder; mariticide; filicide; child murder
- Weapons: Pillows and samurai sword
- Victims: 3
- Perpetrator: Manling Tsang Williams
- Motive: Resentment against her husband and children, infidelity
- Verdict: Guilty
- Convictions: Death

Between August 7–8, 2007, in Rowland Heights, California, United States, Manling Tsang Williams, murdered her two sons, Devon and Ian, by suffocating them with a pillow, and then murdered her husband, Neal, by stabbing him to death over 90 times with a Samurai sword. She then attempted to pretend she found the bodies in an attempt to appear innocent.

She then confessed to murdering her family after detectives showed incriminating evidence against her. She was sent to trial where she was convicted of the murders of her family and was sentenced to death. She became the first Chinese woman in California's history to be sentenced to death.

== Background ==
Manling Tsang Williams was born in 1979 to a Taiwanese immigrant family. As a child, she was abused by her mother. Manling was a student of Los Altos High School in Hacienda Heights, California. She was bullied there due to her learning disabilities leading her to have psychological issues. Despite this, she was able to graduate. She would meet her husband, Neal Williams, at Subway where they were both employed. They soon began dating and on July 26, 2000, Manling gave birth to their first son, Devon. In 2001, Manling and Neal got married and moved into a condominium in Rowland Heights. In fall of 2003, she gave birth to their second son, Ian. The couple got jobs, with Manling worked as a waitress at a Marie Callender's in the City of Industry, while Neal was a stay-at-home dad who worked on his computer for an insurance company. During his time at home, Neal was an avid collector of samurai swords.

The family was described as a happy family by neighbors. However, many also said Manling and Neal frequently yelled at each other.

She later had an affair with a former classmate from High School after she contacted him on Myspace in June. They went out a couple of times but he broke it off since he felt wrong dating a married woman. He said if she got a divorce they could date again.

== Details ==
On August 8, 2007, Neighbors called 9-1-1 around 7:30-45 P:M after hearing Manling Williams screaming she found her husband and sons deceased. One neighbor went inside the residence and discovered Neal, face down in the hallway upstairs. He was covered in blood and had multiple stab wounds. The neighbor went into Devon and Ian's bedroom and discovered the boys deceased in their bunk beds.

=== Arrest and confession ===
Police became suspicious of Manling after she made many inconsistent statements. During her statements, she said she bought a pack of cigarettes and a few other items while out at a gas station. Police discovered the cigarettes in her car and found blood on it. It came back as Neal's blood. Manling soon confessed to the murders of her family after this finding. On the night of August 7, while Neal was out, she put Devon and Ian in bed. After they fell asleep, she went back onto their rooms and smothered them to death with a pillow. After killing her sons, she showered, looked at her affair partner's MySpace page, and went out to TGI Fridays with friends for drinks. She then returned home, where she found her husband sleeping. Manling then grabbed one of Neal's samurai swords and began slashing him while he was still in bed. Manling then chased him through the house slashing him more. During the ordeal, Neal begged for his life. He soon died after Manling stabbed in the chest, piercing his heart.

Manling was arrested after her confession and held without bail. She was soon charged with three counts of first degree murder and special circumstances of lying in wait. She faced the death penalty.

== Trial ==
In 2010, Manling went to trial. There, the prosecution were trying to get a first degree murder conviction with the allegation of Manling planning the murders in advance. Her defense denied this, admitting she did kill her family, but instead the act was a spontaneous act. The claim was rebutted after witnesses testified Manling had dreams of her family being murdered, affirming the prosecution's claims of premeditation. A jury took eight hours to deliberate before convicting her of the murders. However they did deadlock when deciding a penalty.

A new death penalty phase trial would begin in 2011, in hopes of a new jury sentencing Manling to death. A jury later returned a verdict of death. On January 18, 2012, Manling Williams was sentenced to death. Her sentence was commuted to life imprisonment without the possibility of parole when Gavin Newsom commuted all death sentences on November 5, 2026.

== Media ==
The case of Manling Williams and the murders of her family have been profiled in numerous programs.

- American Monster - Season 2, episode 8, “Live by the Sword”.
- Deadliest Mums and Dads - Season 1, episode 7, “A Merciless Mother”.
- Meet, Marry, Murder - Season 1, episode 50, “Manling Tsang Williams”.
- Deadly Women - Season 6, episode 14, “Death Benefits.”

== See also ==
- Watts family murders – similar familicide
