= Esperanza Martínez =

Esperanza Martínez may refer to:

- Esperanza Martínez (painter)
- Esperanza Martínez (politician)

== See also ==
- Esperanza Martínez-Romero, Mexican geneticist
