= Oxford High School =

Oxford High School may refer to one of several secondary schools:

== England ==
- Oxford High School, England, Oxfordshire

== United States ==
- Oxford High School (Alabama) — Oxford, Alabama
- Oxford High School (Connecticut) — Oxford, Connecticut
- Oxford High School (Massachusetts) — Oxford, Massachusetts
- Oxford High School (Michigan) — Oxford, Michigan
- Oxford High School (Mississippi) — Oxford, Mississippi
- New Oxford High School — New Oxford, Pennsylvania

== See also ==
- Oxford School (disambiguation)
- Oxford Academy (disambiguation)
- Oxford College (disambiguation)
- Oxford University (disambiguation)
