= Oxford College =

Oxford College may refer to:

- The University of Oxford, collegiate research university located in Oxford, England
  - Colleges of the University of Oxford
  - There are various institutions in Oxford, England, that use the phrase "Oxford College" in their name but have no connections with the University
- Oxford College of Emory University in Oxford, Georgia
- Aletheia University, private university in Tamsui, Taiwan; formerly Oxford (University) College
- Oxford College for Women, former women's college in Oxford, Ohio; formerly Oxford Female Institute and Oxford Female College
- Oxford College, a defunct college in Oxford, Alabama, that operated from 1867 to 1900

== See also ==
- Oxford University (disambiguation)
- Oxford University College (disambiguation)
- Oxford School (disambiguation)
- Oxford High School (disambiguation)
- Oxford Academy (disambiguation)
