= Rowland Heights, California =

Census-designated place in California, United States

- Unincorporated community Census designated place
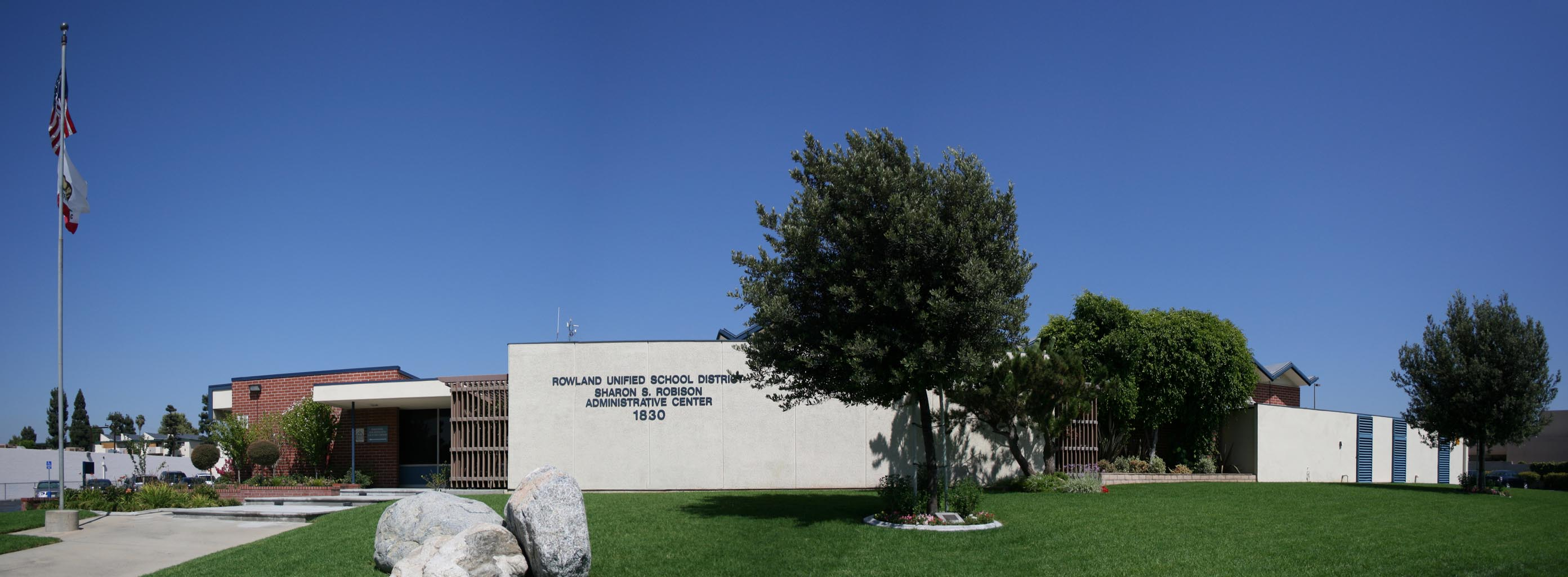
- Rowland Unified School District headquarters
- Interactive map of Rowland Heights, California
- Location in California Location in the United States
- Coordinates: 33°58′51″N 117°53′23″W
- Country: United States
- State: California
- County: Los Angeles
- Named for: John A. Rowland

Government
  - County Supervisor: Hilda Solis
  - Community Council President: Yvette Romo

Area
  - Total: 13.085 sq mi (33.889 km^{2})
  - Land: 13.077 sq mi (33.868 km^{2})
  - Water: 0.0077 sq mi (0.020 km^{2}) 0.06%
- Elevation: 520 ft (160 m)

Population (2020)
  - Total: 48,231
  - Density: 3,688.4/sq mi (1,424.1/km^{2})
- Time zone: UTC-8 (Pacific)
  - Summer (DST): UTC-7 (PDT)
- ZIP code: 91748, 92821
- Area codes: 562, 626, and 909
- FIPS code: 06-63218
- GNIS feature ID: 1661344

Rowland Heights is an unincorporated community and census designated place (CDP) in and below the Puente Hills in the San Gabriel Valley, in Los Angeles County, California, United States. The population was 48,231 at the 2020 census. Rowland Heights is in the Los Angeles metropolitan area and represented by the County of Los Angeles (County Board of Supervisors) and is the second largest census designated place in Los Angeles County by area, behind Topanga, and the county's fifth largest CDP by population. The area has a high Taiwanese population and was known as "Little Taipei" in the 1980s and 1990s, when it saw an influx of wealthy immigrants from Taiwan.

A number of corporations, such as Newegg, FedEx, DIRECTV, and Fashion Nova, as well as other technology and import and export businesses, are located in neighboring City of Industry. Many business owners and employees reside in Rowland Heights as well as neighboring Hacienda Heights and Walnut due to their proximity.

== History ==
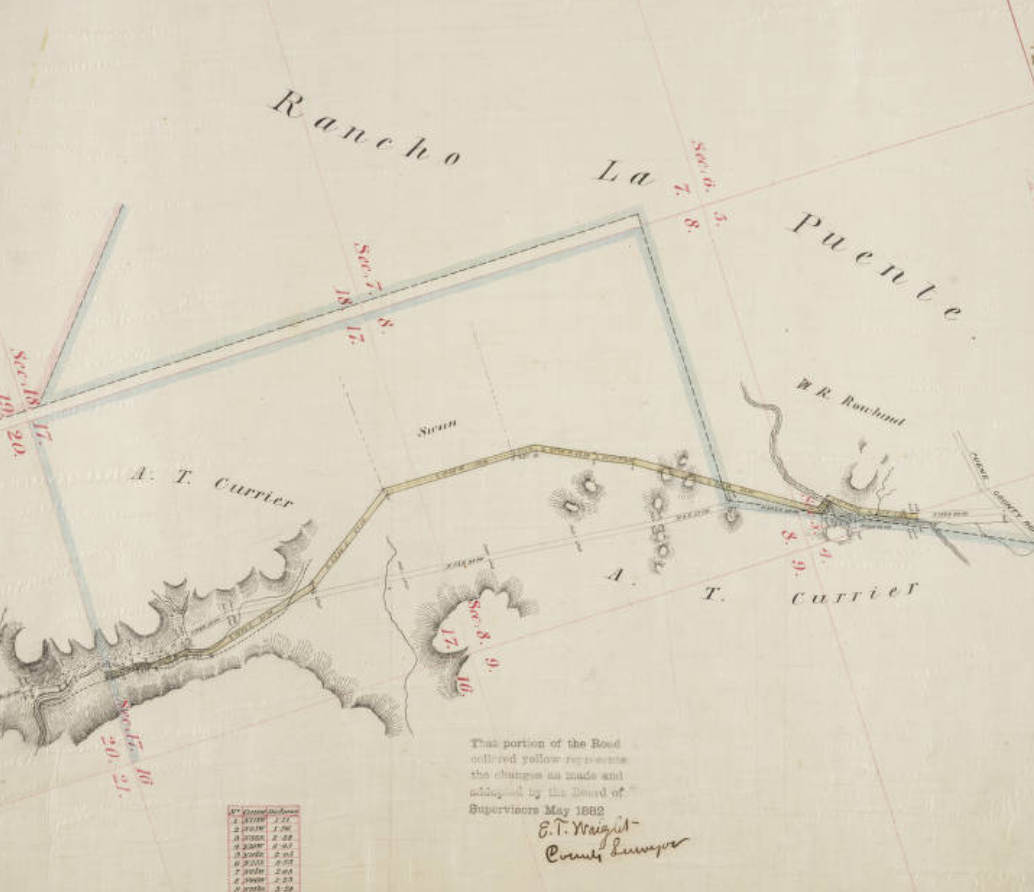
Rowland Heights sits on land that was originally part of Rancho La Puente, a Mexican-era rancho grant.

The Mexican land grant Rancho La Puente was granted by Governor Juan B. Alvarado to John Rowland in April 1842, totaling about 18,000 acres (7,284 ha). Three years later, Governor Pio Pico amended the grant, enlarging it to nearly 49,000 acres (19,830 ha) and adding William Workman as a co-owner. In 1868, after they received their federal land patent the prior year, Rowland and Workman divided Rancho La Puente, with Workman largely taking the western and central portions and Rowland the northern, southern and eastern sections, including what became most of Rowland Heights. The east section of Rowland Heights, between Nogales Street and Brea Canyon Road, falls within Rancho Rincon de la Brea. The ranch of Rowland's grandson, John A. Rowland III was behind the 99 Ranch Market near the corner of Gale Avenue and Nogales Street and the Rowland family owns part of that property today, leasing most of it for commercial use.

Rowland Heights grew significantly during the 1990s. Originally built on a pig farm that covered much of modern-day Rowland Heights, the Rowland Homestead was mostly orange groves until the eastward sprawl from Los Angeles spawned working-class communities and affordable housing developments then formed. As the 60 freeway was extended beyond the western boundary, the community continued growth equal to that of most communities in Southern California. Development next to the freeway, zoned for industrial investment, eventually helped to support the housing developments that continue well into the 21st century.

Since the 1990s, there has been a significant demographic shift as many upper-class immigrants from Taiwan, China, and South Korea have settled in the hillside homes of Rowland Heights (and in neighboring regions such as Hacienda Heights, Walnut, and Diamond Bar). Also, Rowland Heights has also attracted immigrants from mainland China because the area is advertised in China as having high-end homes and convenient shopping centers. Many work at or own businesses in the nearby City of Industry. Additionally, Latinos have maintained a long-standing presence in the lower sections. The city has developed an eclectic suburban "Chinatown", "Little Tokyo", and "Koreatown", mostly in the form of upscale strip malls. There are several large Asian product supermarkets in the area.

Once predominantly Anglo and Hispanic since inception in 1842, this area has gradually become one of the Chinese centers in the greater Los Angeles beginning in the 1990s. Originally formed by the stream of business expansions from Monterey Park (now a heavily mainland Chinese enclave), Rowland Heights has become an area largely populated by Taiwanese. Local Taiwanese refer to Rowland Heights as "Little Taipei", due to its high concentration of Taiwanese restaurants and businesses. It has become the center for Chinese commercial and cultural activity in the southeastern region of the San Gabriel Valley. While Rowland Heights and adjacent areas are still predominantly Waishengren (mainland Chinese refugees who retreated to Taiwan in 1949), in recent years many mainland Chinese emigres have also been increasingly purchasing homes and starting small businesses in the area. Some eateries of Taiwanese cuisine are operated by mainland Chinese. Additionally, there are restaurants geared toward the young and affluent Chinese population.

Possibly owing to Rowland Heights as evolving into the cultural center for the Chinese diaspora, many 49er Taiwanese and a growing number of mainland Chinese now live in the area. In 1992, a connection (Harbor Boulevard) from northern Orange County (mostly to the city of La Habra) opened in Rowland Heights, making Fullerton Road among the heavily traversed roads in the region.

The area gained national attention in 2007, when Manling Williams, murdered her husband and two sons, due to her wanting to start a new life without them. She was convicted of the crime and sentenced to death.

In March 2012, a 750,000 pounds (340 t), two-story granite rock was parked on Pathfinder Road as it journeyed from Riverside County to the Los Angeles County Museum of Art as part of Michael Heizer’s Levitated Mass exhibition.

In March 2015, a bullying incident involving Chinese nationals occurred in Rowland Heights. This incident involved Chinese nationals, who assaulted a 16-year-old girl at a restaurant and at a park in Rowland Heights. Later in the month, another incident began at the Honeymee, an ice cream parlor in Yes Plaza on Colima and Fullerton Roads. The perpetrators forced her to clean up ice cream smears and cigarette butts with her hand before taking her to Rowland Heights Park, where she was stripped of her clothing, slapped, burned with cigarettes, beaten, and forced to eat her own hair, which her assailants cut from her head. The attack lasted for over five hours.

== Geography ==
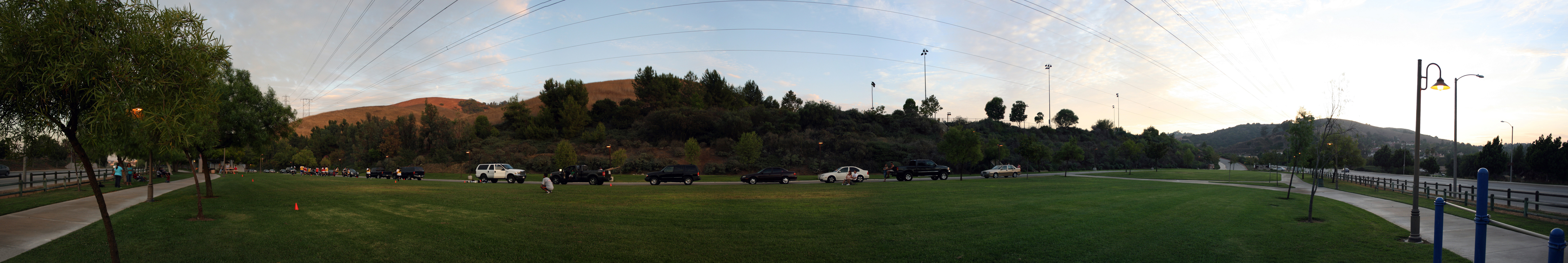
Pathfinder Park

Rowland Heights is located in Los Angeles County adjacent to Orange County. The census definition of the area was created by the Census Bureau for statistical purposes and may not precisely correspond to local understanding of the area with the same name. According to the United States Census Bureau, the CDP has a total area of 13.1 square miles (34 km^{2}).

Rowland Heights is bordered by Hacienda Heights to the northwest, Diamond Bar to the east, Brea to the south, La Habra Heights to the southwest, and the City of Industry to the north.

=== Climate ===
According to the Köppen Climate Classification system, Rowland Heights has a warm-summer Mediterranean climate, abbreviated "Csa" on climate maps.

== Demographics ==
Historical population
Census	Pop.	Note	%±
1970	16,881		—
1980	28,252		67.4%
1990	42,647		51.0%
2000	48,553		13.8%
2010	48,993		0.9%
2020	48,231		−1.6%
U.S. Decennial Census; 1860–1870 1880-1890; 1900 1910 1920; 1930 1940 1950; 1960 1970 1980; 1990 2000 2010; 2020

For statistical purposes, the United States Census Bureau has defined Rowland Heights as a 13.1 square miles (34 km^{2}) census-designated place (CDP). Rowland Heights first appeared as an unincorporated place in the 1970 U.S. census as part of the East San Gabriel Valley census county division; and as a census designated place in the 1980 United States census.

=== Racial and ethnic composition ===
Rowland Heights CDP, California – Racial and ethnic composition Note: the US Census treats Hispanic/Latino as an ethnic category. This table excludes Latinos from the racial categories and assigns them to a separate category. Hispanics/Latinos may be of any race.
Race / Ethnicity (NH = Non-Hispanic)	Pop 2000	Pop 2010	Pop 2020	% 2000	% 2010	% 2020
White alone (NH)	7,899	5,045	3,467	16.27%	10.30%	7.19%
Black or African American alone (NH)	1,163	683	655	2.40%	1.39%	1.36%
Native American or Alaska Native alone (NH)	45	43	45	0.09%	0.09%	0.09%
Asian alone (NH)	24,308	29,135	29,583	50.06%	59.47%	61.34%
Native Hawaiian or Pacific Islander alone (NH)	133	60	53	0.27%	0.12%	0.11%
Other race alone (NH)	64	28	144	0.13%	0.06%	0.30%
Mixed race or Multiracial (NH)	1,193	770	769	2.46%	1.57%	1.59%
Hispanic or Latino (any race)	13,748	13,229	13,515	28.32%	27.00%	28.02%
Total	48,553	48,993	48,231	100.00%	100.00%	100.00%

=== 2020 census ===
As of the 2020 census, Rowland Heights had a population of 48,231 and a population density of 3,688.2 inhabitants per square mile (1,424.0/km^{2}). The census reported that 99.7% of residents lived in households and 0.3% lived in non-institutionalized group quarters, with no institutionalized residents.

The median age was 42.9 years. 17.7% of residents were under the age of 18 and 20.0% were 65 years of age or older. For every 100 females there were 95.4 males, and for every 100 females age 18 and over there were 93.3 males age 18 and over.

98.9% of residents lived in urban areas, while 1.1% lived in rural areas.

There were 14,889 households, of which 31.7% had children under the age of 18 living in them. Of all households, 56.7% were married-couple households, 15.0% were households with a male householder and no spouse or partner present, and 24.6% were households with a female householder and no spouse or partner present. About 13.2% of all households were made up of individuals and 6.4% had someone living alone who was 65 years of age or older. There were 12,245 families (82.2% of all households).

Rowland Heights had 15,484 housing units, of which 3.8% were vacant. Of the occupied units, 61.9% were owner-occupied and 38.1% were rented. The homeowner vacancy rate was 0.8% and the rental vacancy rate was 4.5%.

Racial composition as of the 2020 census
Race	Number	Percent
White	5,357	11.1%
Black or African American	709	1.5%
American Indian and Alaska Native	431	0.9%
Asian	29,793	61.8%
Native Hawaiian and Other Pacific Islander	61	0.1%
Some other race	7,396	15.3%
Two or more races	4,484	9.3%
Hispanic or Latino (of any race)	13,515	28.0%

=== 2010 census ===
The 2010 United States census reported that Rowland Heights had a population of 48,993. The population density was 3,745.2 inhabitants per square mile (1,446.0/km^{2}). The racial makeup of Rowland Heights was 29,284 (59.8%) Asian, 11,506 (23.5%) White (10.3% Non-Hispanic White), 772 (1.6%) African American, 175 (0.4%) Native American, 61 (0.1%) Pacific Islander, 5,658 (11.5%) from other races, and 1,537 (3.1%) from two or more races. Hispanic or Latino of any race were 13,229 persons (27.0%).

The Census reported that 48,831 people (99.7% of the population) lived in households, 148 (0.3%) lived in non-institutionalized group quarters, and 14 (0%) were institutionalized.

There were 14,520 households, out of which 5,557 (38.3%) had children under the age of 18 living in them, 9,137 (62.9%) were opposite-sex married couples living together, 2,080 (14.3%) had a female householder with no husband present, 1,097 (7.6%) had a male householder with no wife present. There were 424 (2.9%) unmarried opposite-sex partnerships, and 69 (0.5%) same-sex married couples or partnerships. 1,585 households (10.9%) were made up of individuals, and 638 (4.4%) had someone living alone who was 65 years of age or older. The average household size was 3.36. There were 12,314 families (84.8% of all households); the average family size was 3.54.

The population was spread out, with 9,960 people (20.3%) under the age of 18, 4,854 people (9.9%) aged 18 to 24, 12,918 people (26.4%) aged 25 to 44, 14,819 people (30.2%) aged 45 to 64, and 6,442 people (13.1%) who were 65 years of age or older. The median age was 40.2 years. For every 100 females, there were 96.6 males. For every 100 females age 18 and over, there were 94.9 males.

There were 15,152 housing units at an average density of 1,158.3 units per square mile (447.2 units/km^{2}), of which 9,811 (67.6%) were owner-occupied, and 4,709 (32.4%) were occupied by renters. The homeowner vacancy rate was 0.8%; the rental vacancy rate was 7.2%. 33,167 people (67.7% of the population) lived in owner-occupied housing units and 15,664 people (32.0%) lived in rental housing units. The estimated median house or condo value in 2009 was $461,614. In 2018, this number has increased; the median home value in Rowland Heights is now at $669,600 with the median listing price at $788,500.

According to the 2010 United States census, Rowland Heights had a median household income of $62,631, with 10.6% of the population living below the federal poverty line. According to Los Angeles Times research regarding median income ranking, Rowland Heights is ranked at 87 at $72,638; 6.6% of households in Rowland Heights make over $200,000 a year.

Updated information showed that the average household income in Rowland Heights was $99,354, while the median household income was $83,606; compared to Los Angeles, where the average household income was $81,225, and the median household income was $56,993. The average household net worth was at $807,328.

=== Income ===
In 2023, the US Census Bureau estimated that the median household income was $85,202, and the per capita income was $39,842. About 9.2% of families and 11.3% of the population were below the poverty line.

== Parks and recreation ==
=== Schabarum Regional Park ===
Peter F. Schabarum, a Republican, represented the 49th district in the California State Assembly from 1967 to 1972. He was appointed to the Los Angeles County Board of Supervisors in March 1972 by Gov. Ronald Reagan following the death of incumbent Frank G. Bonelli and elected to the position three months later in a hotly contested special election that pitted him against his former roommate and colleague Assemblyman William Campbell. Schabarum was re-elected in 1974, 1978, 1982 and 1986. He did not seek re-election in 1990, but served three extra months until Feb. 28, 1991, to allow a special election to be held following a court ruling that redrew the boundaries of his district to create a majority-Latino district, later occupied by Gloria Molina. Schabarum was noted for opposing government unions, supporting privatization of certain county duties, and supporting the decentralization of County government. In addition, he was the leading backer of California's Proposition 140 on the 1990 ballot, which imposed term limits on the California Legislature.

His legacy lives on through the Peter F. Schabarum Regional Park, locally known as Schabarum Park. It is in his former supervisorial district and named after him. The regional park offers playgrounds, picnic areas, and horseback riding and trails in the surrounding Puente Hills.

==== Cherry Blossom Festival ====
Schabarum Regional Park is also known for ume and sakura Cherry blossoms. 500 ume trees were donated by Kairaku-en in Mito, Ibaraki, Japan when the two parks established a "sister-park" relationship in 1992.

=== Community library ===
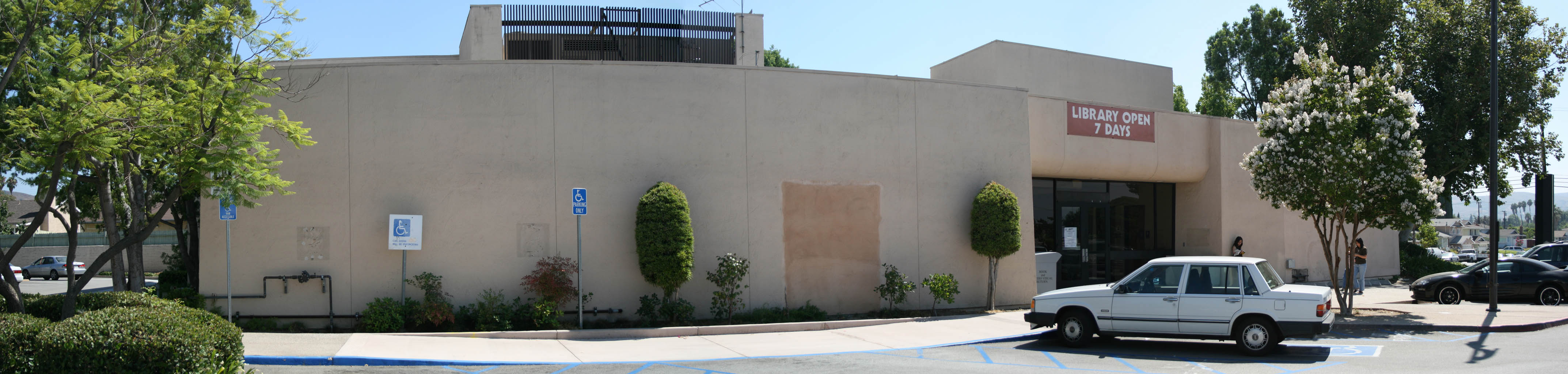
Public Library Branch

Los Angeles County Library operates the library branch. The library went under renovation in 2015 and reopened in 2018.

== Government ==
The community is part of Supervisorial District 1 of the Los Angeles County Board of Supervisors, represented by Supervisor Hilda Solis.

In the California State Legislature, Rowland Heights is in the 30th senatorial district, represented by Democrat Bob Archuleta and the 56th Assembly district, represented by Democrat Lisa Calderon. In the U.S. House of Representatives, it is located in California's 38th congressional district, represented by Democrat Linda Sánchez.

The Los Angeles County Department of Health Services operates the Pomona Health Center in Pomona, serving Rowland Heights.

=== Community Council ===
The Rowland Heights Community Coordinating Council is a civic organization that represents the Rowland Heights community before the County of Los Angeles and other governmental agencies. The council offers monthly community forums for government officials and residents to discuss issues.

Governed by an annually elected board of community councilmembers, the council facilitates communication between the community and government agencies, and issues advisory opinions on local land use, development, and public policy.

As of 2026, there are 8 elected community councilmembers serving on the RHCCC.

=== Law enforcement ===
The Los Angeles County Sheriff's Department (LASD) operates the Walnut/Diamond Bar Station in Walnut. It is spread out over 260 square miles (670 km^{2}), encompassing the contract cities of Diamond Bar and Walnut, and the unincorporated area of Rowland Heights. In addition the LASD operates the Rowland Heights Asian Community Center. The California Highway Patrol (CHP), Santa Fe Springs Area office, is responsible for traffic enforcement matters and traffic collision investigations throughout unincorporated area of Rowland Heights, unincorporated Hacienda Heights, and State Route 60 freeway, which is a major thoroughfare between the city of Los Angeles and the Inland Empire.

== Education ==
Rowland Unified School District is the school district for the census-designated place.

High Schools

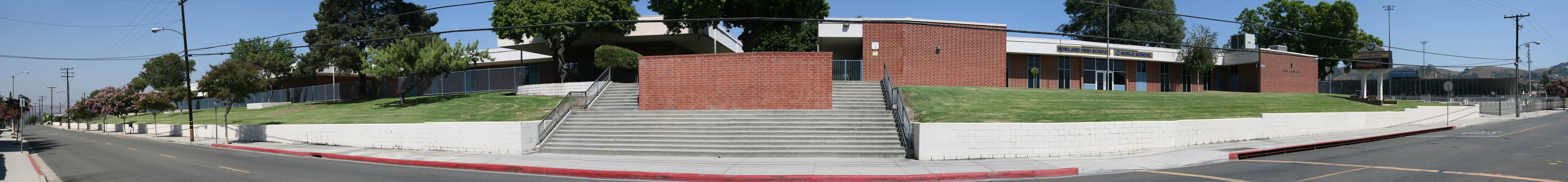
John A. Rowland High School

- Rowland High School Grades: 09 - 12
- Nogales High School; Grades: 09 - 12

Alternative Schools

- Santana High School
- Rowland Unified Community Day School Students: 57; Grades: 07 - 12
- Rowland Assistive Technology Academy

Middle/Intermediate Schools

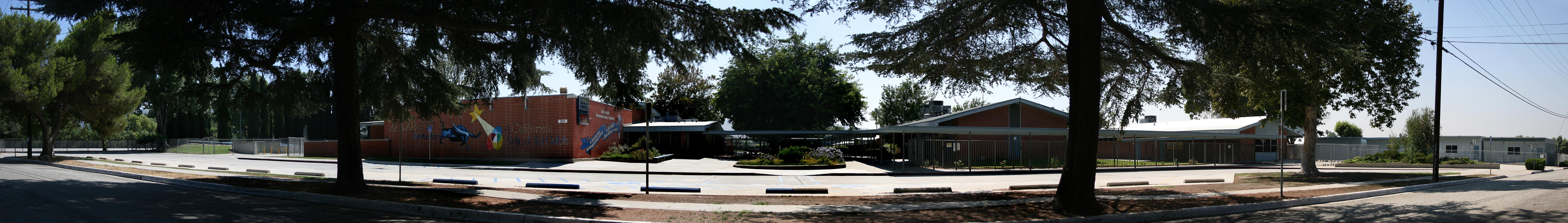
Alvarado Intermediate School

- Alvarado Intermediate School 7–8
- Giano Intermediate School 7–8
- Rincon Intermediate School 7-8 (Closed, but now Telesis Academy)

Private schools

- Oxford School 7–12
- Southlands Christian Schools; Preschool-12

Colleges

- Mount San Antonio College - located in Walnut to serve area high schools

== Transportation ==
Pathfinder Road, Colima Road, and Gale Avenue/Walnut Drive are the main west–east arterials. Nogales Street, Fairway Drive/Brea Canyon Cut-off Road, and Fullerton Road/Harbor Boulevard are the main north–south arterials.

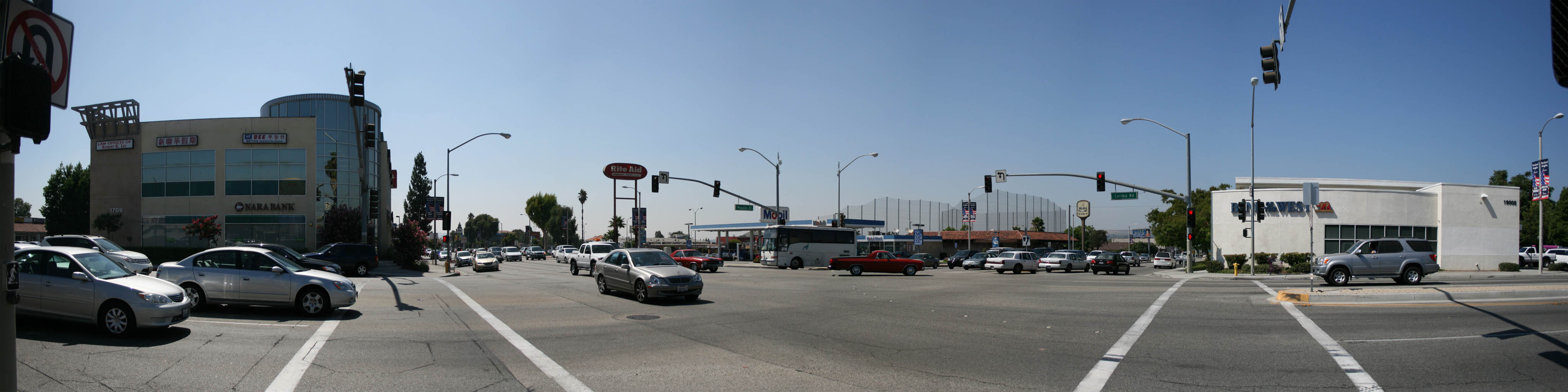
Colima/Nogales intersection

Foothill Transit and the Metro provide bus transit services throughout the San Gabriel Valley. The main Metro Bus Terminal is in El Monte. In addition, the Metrolink commuter train runs west towards Downtown Los Angeles and east to San Bernardino through the Valley；the station that serves Rowland Heights is Industry station. Metro may possibly extend the Metro Expo Line to Rowland Heights in the second half of the 21st century in the future.

The San Gabriel Valley is served by several major interstate highways. Those in proximity to Rowland Heights include the San Bernardino Freeway (Interstate 10), Foothill Freeway (I-210), San Gabriel River Freeway (I-605), and the Long Beach Freeway (I-710). State freeways include the Orange Freeway (State Route 57), the Pomona Freeway (State Route 60).

China Airlines, one of the major airline companies in Taiwan, operates private bus services to Los Angeles International Airport from Hk 2 Food District in Rowland Heights to take residents to Taipei, Taiwan.

== Notable people ==
- Lanhee Chen (1995) - Policy Director of the Mitt Romney presidential campaign, 2012 and Romney's chief policy adviser; Senior Adviser of the Marco Rubio presidential campaign, 2016; member of the U.S. Social Security Advisory Board
