= Cultellunguis =

Scientific classification
- Kingdom: Animalia
- Phylum: Arthropoda
- Clade: Pancrustacea
- Class: Insecta
- Order: Coleoptera
- Suborder: Polyphaga
- Infraorder: Elateriformia
- Family: Cantharidae
- Tribe: Cantharini
- Genus: Cultellunguis; McKey-Fender, 1950

Genus of beetles

Cultellunguis is a genus of soldier beetles in the family Cantharidae. There are about nine described species in Cultellunguis.

== Species ==
These nine species belong to the genus Cultellunguis:

- Cultellunguis americanus (Pic, 1906)^{i g}
- Cultellunguis hatchi McKey-Fender, 1950^{i g}
- Cultellunguis ingenuus (LeConte, 1881)^{i g b}
- Cultellunguis larvalis (LeConte, 1857)^{i g}
- Cultellunguis lautus (LeConte, 1851)^{i g}
- Cultellunguis mackenziei McKey-Fender, 1950^{i g}
- Cultellunguis macnabianus McKey-Fender, 1950^{i g}
- Cultellunguis ochropus (LeConte, 1881)^{i g}
- Cultellunguis perpallens (Fall, 1936)^{i g b}

Data sources: i = ITIS, c = Catalogue of Life, g = GBIF, b = Bugguide.net
