= Oxford Academy =

Oxford Academy may refer to:

- Oxford Academy (California), Cypress, California
- Oxford Academy (Connecticut), Westbrook, Connecticut
- Oxford Academy, Oxfordshire, Oxford, United Kingdom
- Oxford Academy & Central Schools, Oxford, New York
- Oxford Academy for the Gifted, Northborough, Massachusetts

== See also ==
- Oxford School (disambiguation)
- Oxford High School (disambiguation)
- Oxford College (disambiguation)
- Oxford University (disambiguation)
