= Cultellunguis perpallens =

Scientific classification
- Domain: Eukaryota
- Kingdom: Animalia
- Phylum: Arthropoda
- Class: Insecta
- Order: Coleoptera
- Suborder: Polyphaga
- Infraorder: Elateriformia
- Family: Cantharidae
- Genus: Cultellunguis
- Species: C. perpallens

Binomial name
- Cultellunguis perpallens (Fall, 1936)

Species of beetle

Cultellunguis perpallens is a species of soldier beetle in the family Cantharidae. It is found in Central America and North America.
