= 2015 Rowland Heights, California bullying incident =

Two incidents of assault in California with Chinese nationals perpetrators

In March 2015, two incidents of bullying and assaults occurred in Rowland Heights, California, with Chinese nationals as the perpetrators and victims.

== Details ==
On March 28, 2015, two Chinese nationals assaulted a 16-year-old girl at a restaurant and a park in Rowland Heights.

On March 30, 2015, another incident began at the Honeymee, an ice cream parlor located in Yes Plaza on Colima and Fullerton Roads. The victim in this case was an 18-year-old girl. The perpetrators forced her to clean up ice cream smears and cigarette butts with her hand before taking her to Rowland Heights Park, located on Banida Avenue, where she was stripped of her clothing, slapped, burned with cigarettes, beaten, and forced to eat her own hair, which her assailants cut from her head. The attack lasted for over five hours.

=== Perpetrators and victims ===
The adult perpetrators of the March 30 incident were Yuhan "Coco" Yang (杨玉涵 Yáng Yùhán), Xinlei "John" Zhang (章鑫磊 Zhāng Xīnlěi), and Yunyao “Helen” Zhai (翟芸瑶 Zhái Yúnyáo). The other three perpetrators of that incident were minors. Zhai and Zhang also participated in the March 28 incident.

The victims and the perpetrators were "parachute kids", high school students from overseas who study in the United States without their parents and/or grandparents present. For this reason, California Judge Thomas C. Falls compared this incident to the events in the book Lord of the Flies, which told the story of unsupervised minors.

The victim of the March 30 incident, as well as the three adult perpetrators, attended the Oxford School, a private school with many international students. As of February 2016, John Zhang's father lived in Shenzhen.

== Trials and convictions ==
The adult perpetrators were arrested on March 31, 2015, after the victims contacted law enforcement. The suspects each had a bail of $3 million. The father of one suspect was arrested after he was accused of attempting to pay off a witness.

The perpetrators were initially charged with torture and kidnapping. In California, being convicted of torture could result in a life sentence. The three adult perpetrators initially pleaded not guilty. Ultimately the three took plea deals. On Tuesday, January 5, 2016, Zhang and Zhai pleaded no contest to kidnapping and assault by great means of force likely to produce great bodily injury. Yang pleaded no contest to these charges. For each person, torture and two kidnapping counts were dismissed as part of the plea bargain.

The perpetrators were ultimately sent to the California state prison system. Zhai, represented by attorney Evan Freed, received a 13-year sentence. Yang received a 10-year sentence. Zhang received a sentence of over 6 years.

Twenty-year-old Zheng Lu, who gave the other perpetrators a pair of scissors but did not directly participate in the attack, was arrested in December 2015 and received a trial separate from the other three adult perpetrators. In 2016, he was sentenced to three years in prison for his participation in the case.

The juvenile suspects were sentenced to the juvenile correctional system.

After the prison sentences of the perpetrators are finished, they will be deported back to China.

== Incarceration ==
As of March 3, 2020, Helen Zhai (CDCR #WF4268) and Coco Yang (CDCR #WF4267) are incarcerated at the California Institution for Women (CIW) in Chino, California. John Zhang has been released from prison.

== Legacy ==
Some Chinese internet users supported the punishment since many similar bullying cases in mainland China have not resulted in criminal prosecution.

== See also ==
- History of Chinese Americans in Los Angeles
