= Oxford University College =

Oxford University College may refer to:

- Any College of Oxford University
- University College, Oxford, one of the colleges of Oxford University located in Oxford, England
- Aletheia University, private university in Tamsui, Taiwan, formerly called the Oxford University College

== See also ==
- Oxford University (disambiguation)
- Oxford College (disambiguation)
