= Hacienda Heights, California =

- Unincorporated community Census designated place
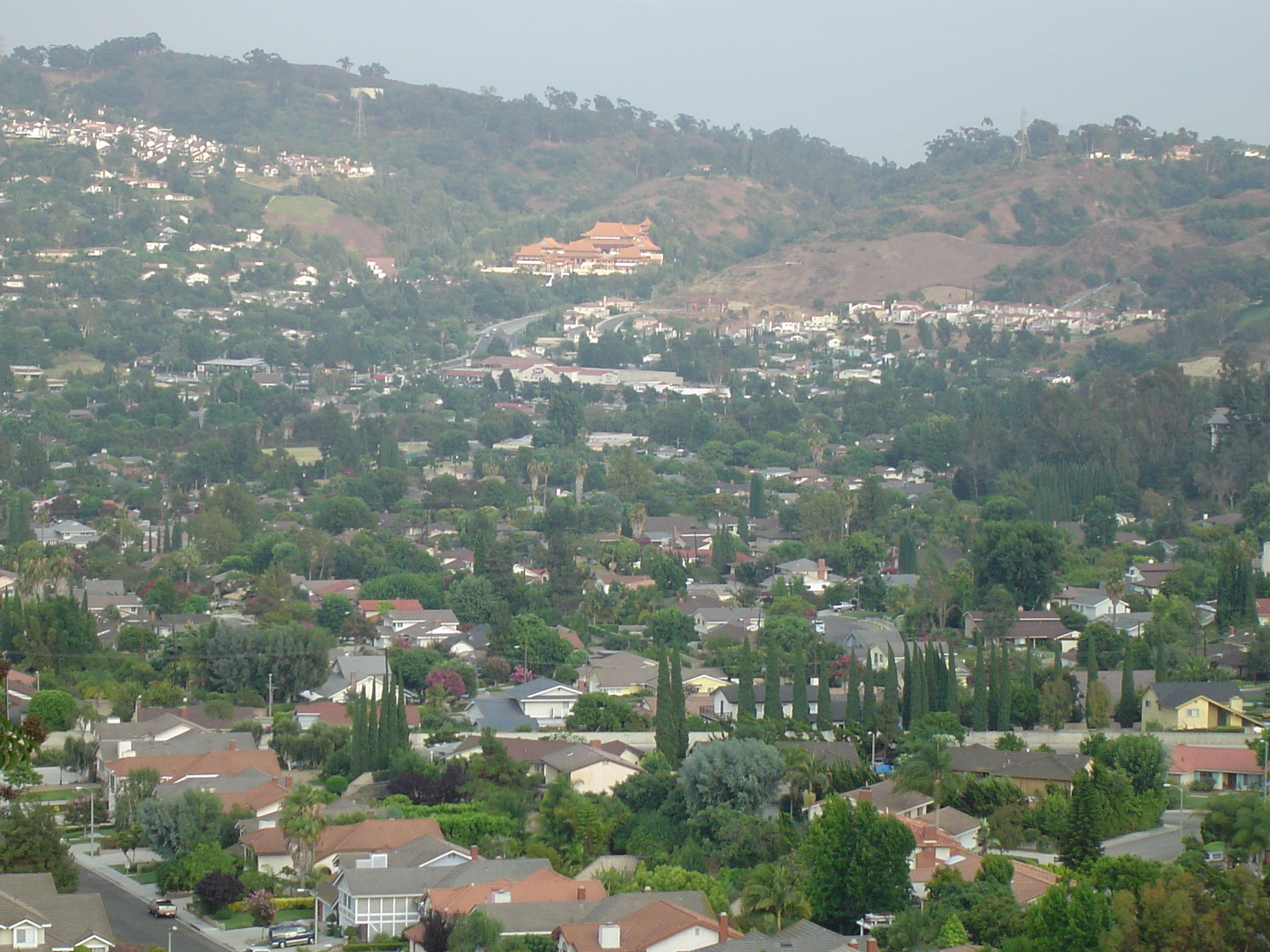
- The view of Hacienda Heights, with Hsi Lai Temple and Puente Hills in the background
- Nickname: The Heights
- Motto: "Growing with Pride"
- Interactive map of Hacienda Heights, California
- Location in the United States Hacienda Heights (California) Hacienda Heights (the United States)
- Coordinates: 34°0′2″N 117°58′10″W
- Country: United States
- State: California
- County: Los Angeles

Area
  - Total: 11.158 sq mi (28.899 km^{2})
  - Land: 11.152 sq mi (28.884 km^{2})
  - Water: 0.0058 sq mi (0.015 km^{2}) 0.05%
- Elevation: 453 ft (138 m)

Population (2020)
  - Total: 54,191
  - Density: 4,859.2/sq mi (1,876.2/km^{2})
- Time zone: UTC-8 (PST)
  - Summer (DST): UTC-7 (PDT)
- ZIP code: 91745
- Area codes: 626, 562
- FIPS code: 06-31596

Hacienda Heights (/ˌhɑːsiˈɛndə/ HAH-see-EN-də) is an unincorporated community in the San Gabriel Valley of Los Angeles County, California, United States. As of the 2020 census, the community had a total population of 54,191, up from 54,038 at the 2010 census. For statistical purposes, the Census Bureau has defined Hacienda Heights as a census designated place (CDP). It is the third largest CDP in Los Angeles County by area, behind Topanga and Rowland Heights, and the county's fourth largest CDP by population.

== History ==
Hacienda Heights sits on land that was originally part of Rancho La Puente. During Spanish rule, the land around Hacienda Heights was operated by the nearby Mission San Gabriel Arcángel in San Gabriel. The Rancho was eventually acquired by John A. Rowland and William Workman in 1845 via a Mexican land grant, and eventually acquired by Elias "Lucky" Baldwin in the mid-1870s. In 1912, his descendant, Anita Baldwin, sold the property to Edwin Hart and Jet Torrance. In 1913 the pair subdivided the area and named it North Whittier Heights, which became known for avocado, citrus and walnut orchards. However, from the Great Depression era to the early 1940s, citrus growing became unprofitable because of pests and diseases, setting the impetus for the area's transformation into a suburb.

Accelerating in the 1950s, suburban residential development transformed Hacienda Heights into a residential or bedroom community. In 1960, the Hacienda Heights Branch of the Los Angeles County Public Library opened. The following year, in 1961, the area was renamed Hacienda Heights. In 1964, the local newspaper, the Hacienda Heights Highlander, was established.

The hills surrounding Hacienda Heights have a history of brush fires, especially in 1978, 1989, and 2020.

== Geography ==
Hacienda Heights is in the eastern San Gabriel Valley bordering City of Industry to the north, Whittier to the west, La Habra Heights to the south, and Rowland Heights to the east along the Pomona Freeway - Route 60. Hacienda Heights is a predominantly residential neighborhood.

According to the United States Census Bureau, the community has a total area of 11.2 square miles (29 km^{2}), of which only 0.05% is water.

Hacienda Heights also has the Puente Hills forming its 'green belt' southern border and much of its western border. The highest point is Workman Hill at 1,391 feet (424 m). Coyotes are a common concern among residents.

Climate data for Hacienda Heights, California
Month	Jan	Feb	Mar	Apr	May	Jun	Jul	Aug	Sep	Oct	Nov	Dec	Year
Record high °F (°C)	90 (32)	89 (32)	97 (36)	110 (43)	107 (42)	114 (46)	114 (46)	114 (46)	112 (44)	110 (43)	95 (35)	99 (37)	114 (46)
Mean daily maximum °F (°C)	68 (20)	70 (21)	70 (21)	75 (24)	77 (25)	83 (28)	88 (31)	89 (32)	87 (31)	82 (28)	74 (23)	69 (21)	78 (26)
Mean daily minimum °F (°C)	43 (6)	45 (7)	46 (8)	49 (9)	53 (12)	57 (14)	60 (16)	61 (16)	60 (16)	54 (12)	47 (8)	43 (6)	52 (11)
Record low °F (°C)	25 (−4)	29 (−2)	30 (−1)	35 (2)	38 (3)	43 (6)	52 (11)	51 (11)	47 (8)	40 (4)	31 (−1)	24 (−4)	24 (−4)
Average precipitation inches (mm)	3.49 (89)	3.74 (95)	3.03 (77)	0.82 (21)	0.30 (7.6)	0.09 (2.3)	0.02 (0.51)	0.15 (3.8)	0.31 (7.9)	0.46 (12)	1.19 (30)	1.90 (48)	15.49 (393)

== Demographics ==
Historical population
Census	Pop.	Note	%±
1970	35,969		—
1980	49,422		37.4%
1990	52,354		5.9%
2000	53,122		1.5%
2010	54,038		1.7%
2020	54,191		0.3%
U.S. Decennial Census; 1860–1870 1880-1890; 1900 1910 1920; 1930 1940 1950; 1960 1970 1980; 1990 2000 2010; 2020

Hacienda Heights first appeared as an unincorporated place in the 1970 U.S. census as part of the East San Gabriel Valley census county division; and as a census designated place in the 1980 United States census.

=== Racial and ethnic composition ===
Hacienda Heights CDP, California – Racial and ethnic composition Note: the US Census treats Hispanic/Latino as an ethnic category. This table excludes Latinos from the racial categories and assigns them to a separate category. Hispanics/Latinos may be of any race.
Race / Ethnicity (NH = Non-Hispanic)	Pop 2000	Pop 2010	Pop 2020	% 2000	% 2010	% 2020
White alone (NH)	11,754	8,035	5,830	22.13%	14.87%	10.76%
Black or African American alone (NH)	750	644	530	1.41%	1.19%	0.98%
Native American or Alaska Native alone (NH)	132	69	95	0.25%	0.13%	0.18%
Asian alone (NH)	19,027	19,878	22,287	35.82%	36.79%	41.13%
Native Hawaiian or Pacific Islander alone (NH)	54	63	59	0.10%	0.12%	0.11%
Other race alone (NH)	53	70	172	0.10%	0.13%	0.32%
Mixed race or Multiracial (NH)	1,032	671	864	1.94%	1.24%	1.59%
Hispanic or Latino (any race)	20,320	24,608	24,354	38.25%	45.54%	44.94%
Total	53,122	54,038	54,191	100.00%	100.00%	100.00%

=== 2020 census ===
As of the 2020 census, Hacienda Heights had a population of 54,191. The median age was 43.2 years. 18.7% of residents were under the age of 18 and 20.6% of residents were 65 years of age or older. For every 100 females there were 94.4 males, and for every 100 females age 18 and over there were 92.7 males age 18 and over.

100.0% of residents lived in urban areas, while 0.0% lived in rural areas.

There were 16,581 households in Hacienda Heights, of which 33.1% had children under the age of 18 living in them. Of all households, 57.8% were married-couple households, 13.6% were households with a male householder and no spouse or partner present, and 24.4% were households with a female householder and no spouse or partner present. About 14.3% of all households were made up of individuals and 8.3% had someone living alone who was 65 years of age or older.

There were 17,088 housing units, of which 3.0% were vacant. The homeowner vacancy rate was 0.5% and the rental vacancy rate was 4.2%.

Racial composition as of the 2020 census
Race	Number	Percent
White	9,813	18.1%
Black or African American	597	1.1%
American Indian and Alaska Native	669	1.2%
Asian	22,502	41.5%
Native Hawaiian and Other Pacific Islander	73	0.1%
Some other race	11,491	21.2%
Two or more races	9,046	16.7%
Hispanic or Latino (of any race)	24,354	44.9%

=== 2010 census ===
The 2010 United States census reported that Hacienda Heights had a population of 54,038. The population density was 4,832.4 inhabitants per square mile (1,865.8/km^{2}). The racial makeup of Hacienda Heights was 38% White (12.6% Non-Hispanic White), 1.1% African American, 0.3% Native American, 39.3% Asian, 0.3% Pacific Islander, and 2.8% from two or more races. Hispanic or Latino of any race were 46%.

The census reported that 53,928 people (99.8% of the population) lived in households, 70 (0.1%) lived in non-institutionalized group quarters, and 40 (0.1%) were institutionalized.

There were 16,193 households, out of which 6,185 (38.2%) had children under the age of 18 living in them, 10,151 (62.7%) were opposite-sex married couples living together, 2,331 (14.4%) had a female householder with no husband present, 1,024 (6.3%) had a male householder with no wife present. There were 555 (3.4%) unmarried opposite-sex partnerships, and 93 (0.6%) same-sex married couples or partnerships. 2,111 households (13.0%) were made up of individuals, and 1,047 (6.5%) had someone living alone who was 65 years of age or older. The average household size was 3.33. There were 13,506 families (83.4% of all households); the average family size was 3.59.

The CDP population contained 11,864 people (22.0%) under the age of 18, 5,184 people (9.6%) aged 18 to 24, 13,597 people (25.2%) aged 25 to 44, 15,071 people (27.9%) aged 45 to 64, and 8,322 people (15.4%) who were 65 years of age or older. The median age was 40.1 years. For every 100 females there were 94.8 males. For every 100 females age 18 and over, there were 92.4 males.

There were 16,650 housing units at an average density of 1,488.9 per square mile (574.9/km^{2}), of which 12,720 (78.6%) were owner-occupied, and 3,473 (21.4%) were occupied by renters. The homeowner vacancy rate was 1.0%; the rental vacancy rate was 3.6%. 42,189 people (78.1% of the population) lived in owner-occupied housing units and 11,739 people (21.7%) lived in rental housing units. Median value of owner-occupied housing units, 2013–2017 was $545,400 with medium gross rent of $1,734.

== Landmarks ==
West of Hacienda Heights is the former Puente Hills Landfill, which was at one time the largest landfill in the U.S. until its closure in 2013. It is now used as a gas-to-energy facility, as well as part of the Puente Hills Habitat Authority.

The "Puente Hills Landfill Native Habitat Preservation Authority" supports public enjoyment and access of the nearby parkland in the Puente Hills. Some of the hiking trails they offer are Hacienda Hills, Sycamore Canyon, Turnbull Canyon and Hellman Park.

=== Hsi Lai Temple ===
Hsi Lai Temple (meaning "Coming West"), a branch of Fo Guang Shan of Taiwan, is the largest Buddhist temple in North America. The temple was completed in 1988 and encompasses 15 acres (61,000 m^{2}) and a floor area of 102,432 sq ft (9,516 m^{2}). The temple's Ming dynasty (1368–1644) and Qing dynasty (1644–1911) architecture is faithful to the traditional style of buildings, Chinese gardens, and statuary of ancient Chinese monasteries. Hsi Lai was built to serve as a spiritual and cultural center for Buddhism and Chinese culture.

== Government ==
=== Representation ===
- Hacienda Heights is within Los Angeles County's first supervisorial district, represented by Hilda Solis.
- In the state senate, Hacienda Heights is in the 30th senatorial district, represented by Democrat Bob Archuleta.
- In the state assembly, Hacienda Heights is in the 56th Assembly district, represented by Democrat Lisa Calderon.
- Federally, Hacienda Heights is located in California's 38th congressional district, represented by Democrat Linda Sánchez.

=== Services ===
The Los Angeles County Sheriff's Department operates the Industry Station in the City of Industry, serving Hacienda Heights.

The Los Angeles County Department of Health Services operates the Pomona Health Center in Pomona, serving Hacienda Heights.

==== Cityhood ====
In 2003, voters were asked to decide whether the community should incorporate and become a city. Proponents argued that a new city would be able to better control development and provide increased police and fire service, while opponents argued that the new city would increase taxes and redevelop residential neighborhoods for revenue-generating businesses. Most of the prime commercial land had already been annexed by the City of Industry to escape taxes levied by the county on unincorporated areas. Ultimately the measure failed by about a 2–1 margin.

== Education ==
The city is served by the Hacienda La Puente Unified School District.

=== High schools ===
- Los Altos High School
- Glen A. Wilson High School
- Valley Alternative High School

=== Middle schools ===
- Newton Middle School
- Orange Grove Middle School
- Cedarlane Academy

=== K-8 schools ===
- Mesa Robles School
- Cedarlane Academy
- St. Marks Lutheran School

=== Elementary schools ===
- Bixby Elementary
- Grazide Elementary
- Kwis Elementary
- Los Altos Elementary
- Los Molinos Elementary
- Los Robles Academy
- Palm Elementary
- Wedgeworth Elementary
- Hillgrove Elementary at 1234 Valencia Ave (1953–1984)

Glenelder Elementary School was merged with Cedarlane and Shadybend was closed down, too.

== Notable people ==
- Micah Ohlman, news anchor
- Phillip Bladh, Sound Engineer, 93rd Academy Awards Oscar winner for best Sound for movie Sound of Metal
- Caprice Bourret, actress and model
- Ralph Brown, football player
- William Campbell, California state legislator
- Shaun Cody, football player
- Andy DeMize, rock musician
- Fergie, singer and actress
- Jeff Garcia, voice actor and comedian
- Rob Hertel, football player
- Hsin Bau, Buddhist monk, former abbot of Hsi Lai Temple
- Gary Jones, former national champion motocross racer
- Josh Keaton, actor and singer, The Spectacular Spider-Man
- Dong Kim, neurosurgeon
- David Lee, photographer and film director, Publisher of Destination Luxury
- Esperanza Martinez, painter
- Sona Movsesian, executive assistant and television personality
- Shane del Rosario, MMA fighter
- Ryan Sakoda, professional wrestler
- Michael Smith, former All-America basketball player at BYU and first-round pick of the Boston Celtics (13th overall), current television and color announcer for Los Angeles Clippers
- Jill Sterkel, 2-time Olympic champion freestyle swimmer
- Kevin Song, professional poker player
- Troy Tanner, professional volleyball player
- Brian Tee, actor
- Scott Williams, professional NBA basketball player
- Marc Yu, child musician

== Community events ==
Since 1966, St. John Vianney Catholic Church in Hacienda Heights has hosted a carnival event called "Early California Days", (also known as 'Harvest in the Heights') usually held for a week each summer. The festivities consists of rides, games, food, music and a grand raffle with cash prizes.

Since the 1970s, there has been an annual football derby between rival high schools, Los Altos and Glen A. Wilson for control of a trophy that resembles a wagon wheel.

== See also ==
- Rowland Heights, neighboring community immediately adjacent to Hacienda Heights on the east.
