= Puente Hills Landfill =

Formerly largest landfill in the United States

Coordinates: 34°01′09″N 118°00′32″W

External images
- From the air in 2005
- Puente Hills Landfill and Hacienda Heights

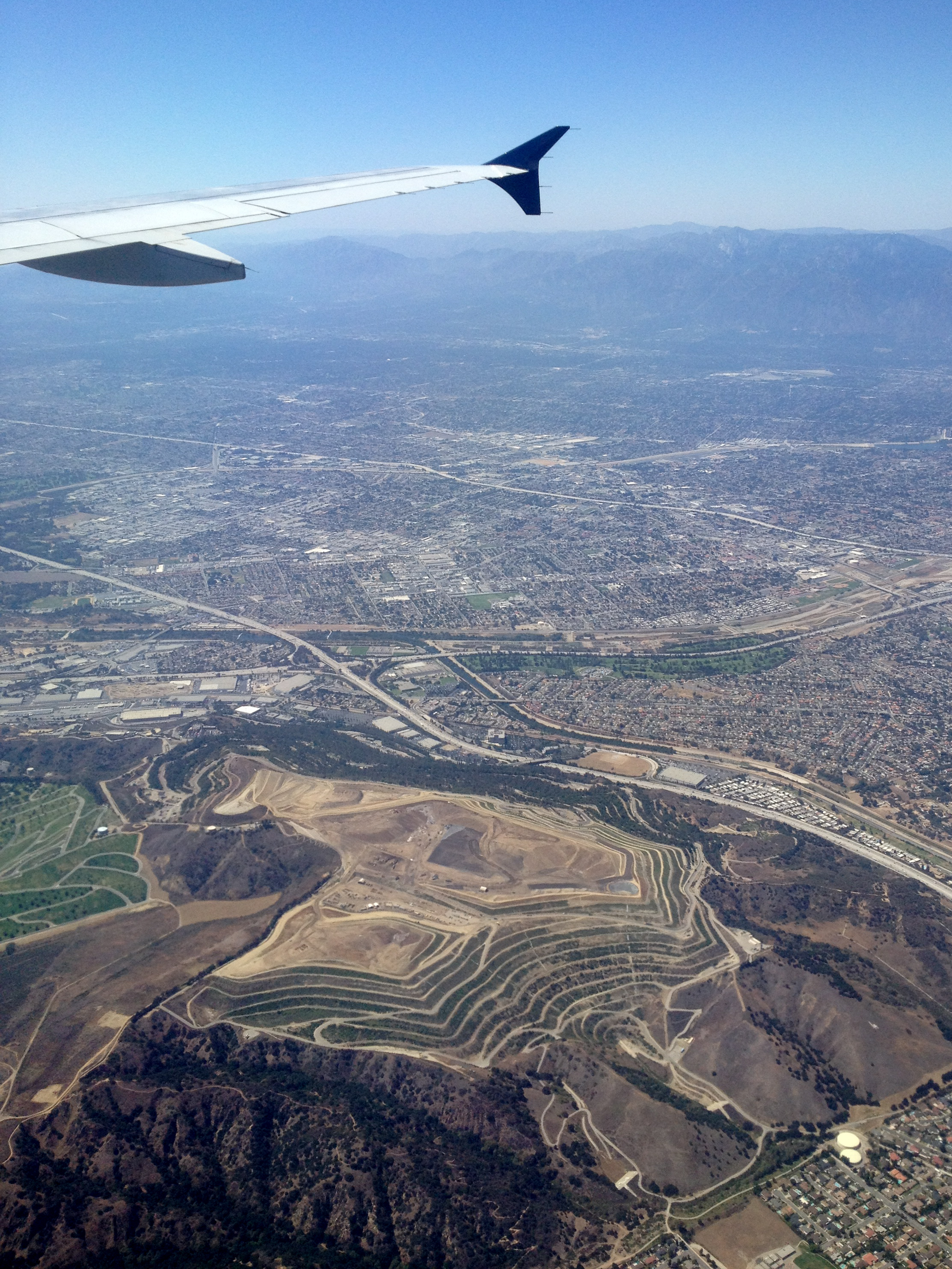
Aerial photo of the landfill.

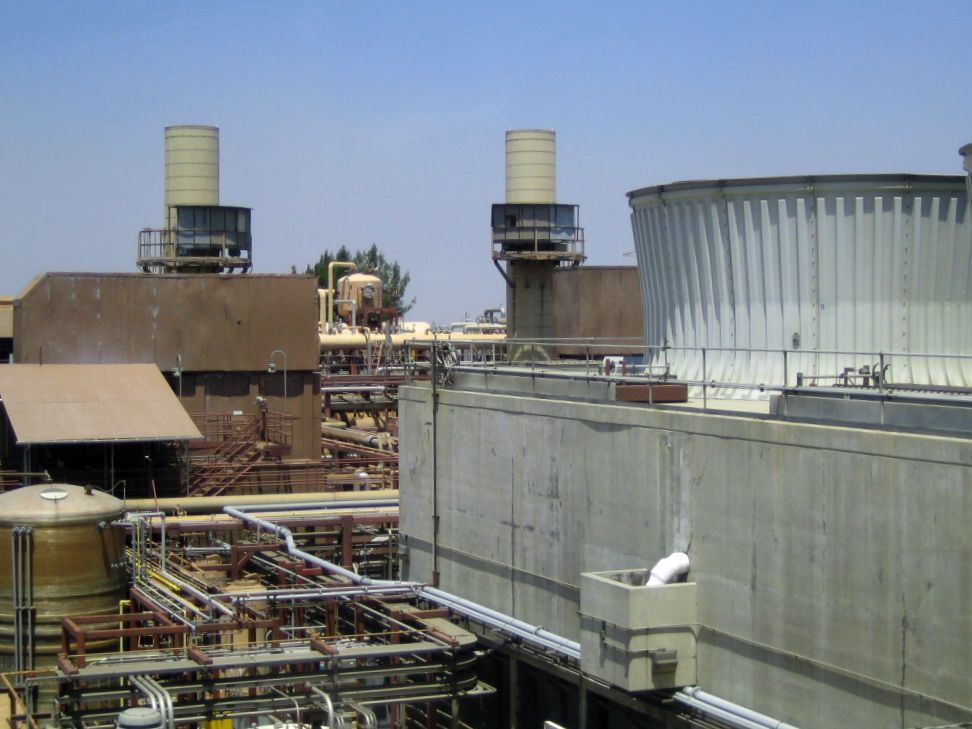
Part of the gas-to-energy facility.

Puente Hills Landfill was the largest landfill in the United States, rising 500 feet (150 meters) high and covering 700 acres (2.8 km^{2}). Originally opened in 1957 in a back canyon in the Puente Hills, the landfill was made to meet the demands of urbanization and waste-disposal east of Los Angeles. By the 1990s, the landfill became an artificial mountain visible around the San Gabriel Valley region. Puente Hills accepted four million tons of waste in 2005. As of October 31, 2013, its operating permit was terminated and it no longer accepts new refuse. The former landfill is in the process of becoming a natural habitat preservation area.

The landfill is located in the Puente Hills, in southeastern Los Angeles County near Whittier, California, and is owned and operated by the Sanitation Districts of Los Angeles County. The closest urban communities are unincorporated Hacienda Heights to the east, and unincorporated Avocado Heights and the City of Industry to the north.

== Gas to energy ==
15 m^{3}/s of landfill gas created by the landfill is funneled to the Puente Hills Gas-to-Energy Facility, a waste-to-energy plant that generates more than 40 MW of power.

== Recycling ==
At the base of the former landfill is a modern recycling facility. The facility is operated with the intent to recover and divert recyclables and combustible material.

== Habitat and park ==
The Puente Hills Landfill offered tours. The Puente Hills Landfill Native Habitat Preservation Authority directs the acquisition, restoration, and management of open space in the Puente Hills for preservation of the land to protect the biological diversity and provide opportunities for outdoor education and low-impact recreation. In 2022, the county approved funding for the Puente Hills Regional Park on 142 acres (57 ha).

== In popular culture ==
Penn and Teller visited the landfill in an episode of their television program Bullshit! to assess the validity of recycling, The television documentary series MegaStructures focused on the landfill in the episode "Garbage Mountain".

Edward Humes discusses the landfill in his book Garbology: Our Dirty Love Affair with Trash (2013).
