= Esperanza Martínez (painter) =

Mexican-American painter

Esperanza Martínez (1934–1998) was a Mexican-born painter who lived in Southern California. She was known for portraits and genre scenes of rural Mexican farmers, formal portraits of prominent Mexican-Americans and pastel paintings of Native American subjects. As a precocious young artist, Martinez studied with the famous Mexican muralist Diego Rivera. She moved to the Los Angeles area in 1963 and lived with her family in Hacienda Heights. Martinez died from cancer in 1998.

== Childhood and artistic training ==
Esperanza Martinez was born as Esperanza Perez was in Mexico City in 1934. She was a precocious talent who began drawing at the age of three at her grandfather's urging. She began painting under the supervision of an art teacher at seven and then, as she matured, she began to study more formally and sold her first painting at the age of twelve. In later interviews she stated that she received little encouragement from her family as they felt that female artists like Frida Kahlo were less than virtuous women. Martinez credited Frida Kahlo's husband, Diego Rivera, with giving her the confidence to become a professional artist.

== Artistic maturity and the United States ==
Martinez and her family emigrated to the United States in 1963. Her brother Alvaro Perez, followed her to the United States a few years later and began working for her Los Angeles dealer. In Los Angeles she began to develop a reputation for her detailed and lifelike portraits of Mexican-American sitters. While she had been influenced early in her life by Diego Rivera and she credited him with helping start her career, she chose a much more detailed, even academic style that River's for her mature work. In Los Angeles Martinez painted the authentic farm people of rural Mexico, dignified paintings of elderly male and female farmers and she did many paintings of Mexican children. Martinez worked mainly in pastel on toned paper and also in oils. Some of her work was done on black velvet, a technique that while associated with inexpensive tourist paintings, actually has a long tradition in the former Spanish Colonies of Mexico and the Philippines. Her paintings were simply signed with her first name "Esperanza.". By the 1970s, she was painting many Native American subjects, sometimes contemporary, living Indians from the Southwest, but also portraits of well known historical figures such as Chief Joseph and Sitting Bull. Martinez painted murals at the famous Los Angeles restaurant La Fonda, which was famous for its mariachis and floor show.

== The Heritage of Mexico Suite ==
In 1973, a suite of limited edition prints was published titled The Heritage of Mexico. The suite consisted of four images: a composition of a dignified old farm couple, titled Los Patriarchos (titled The Old Couple in English) a young boy with a pinata of a horse titled "El Caballito" (titled The Toy Horse in English) a young girl with sweetbread titled Pan Dulce (titled in English Mexican Sweetbread) and finally a pair of girls titled Las Buenas Primas (the Good Cousins is the English title). Collectors of Esperanza Martinez included Jacqueline Kennedy Onassis, Clint Eastwood and the comedian Red Skelton. She was also commissioned to do works for Mexicana Airlines and Coca-Cola Corporation.

== Family and death ==
Esperanza Martinez was married to Jose Domingo "Pepe" De Guadalupe Martinez. She had a single child, a boy named Ollin. She had a long battle with breast cancer and often spoke to young people's groups before her death.

== See also ==
- Diego Rivera
- Frida Kahlo
- National Museum of Mexican Art
