= Puente Hills =

Mountain range of the Transverse Ranges in California, United States

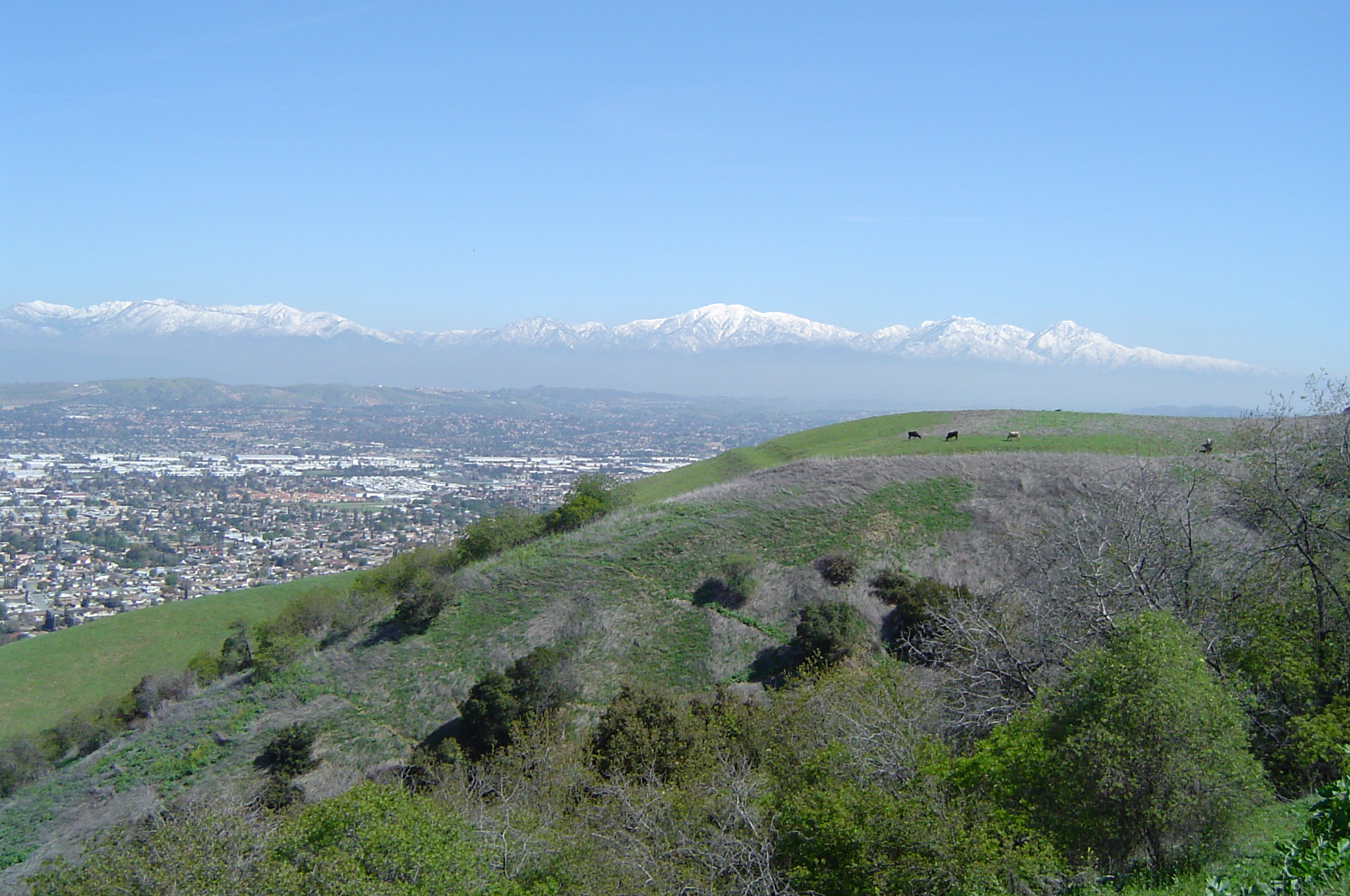
- View of the San Gabriel Mountains from the Puente Hills

Highest point
- Peak: Workman Hill
- Elevation: 424 m (1,391 ft)

Geography
- Location within California Location within the United States Location within the Los Angeles metropolitan area
- Country: United States
- State: California
- District: Los Angeles County
- Range coordinates: 33°59′59.044″N 117°55′3.226″W
- Topo map: USGS La Habra

The Puente Hills are a chain of hills, one of the lower Transverse Ranges, in an unincorporated area in eastern Los Angeles County, California, in the United States. The western end of the range is often referred to locally as the Whittier Hills. The eastern end is in the city of Chino Hills in San Bernardino County.

== Geography ==
The Puente Hills lie to the south of the San Gabriel Valley and the Pomona Freeway (State Route 60), to the east of the San Gabriel River Freeway (Interstate 605), to the north of Whittier Boulevard, and to the west of the city of Diamond Bar and Chino Hills. To its north are the City of Industry, Hacienda Heights, and Rowland Heights. To the south are Whittier, La Habra Heights, La Habra and Brea. The Puente Formation underlies the hills, and the Brea-Olinda Oil Field, discovered in 1880 and still producing in 2025, is in the southernmost portion of the hills adjacent to the city of Brea. The southwest margin of the hills is fault-controlled and trends about N. 65° W., bounding the northeast edge of the central plain of the Los Angeles basin. The Puente Formation is more than 13,000 feet thick and is best exposed in the hills. The hills are a remnant of a once-extensive upland surface that streams have dissected, and the canyons they cut now carry much smaller streams such as Brea and Tonner.

== Flora ==
The Puente Hills are in the California chaparral and woodlands ecoregion of the California Floristic Province. The remnant California native plants here are in the chaparral and oak woodland plant communities, with stands of California native grasses. Vascular Plants of the Whittier Hills, a floristic study, was completed by Julie A. Schneider Ljubenkov and Timothy S. Ross (2001), and published in Crossosoma. It built on the work of Bob Muns. The hills also contain stands of walnut woodland in which the southern California black walnut (also called Juglans californica) is the dominant tree, often with coast live oak (Quercus agrifolia). The mix of plants growing beneath the walnuts in the Puente and San Jose Hills has been attributed to overgrazing by cattle.

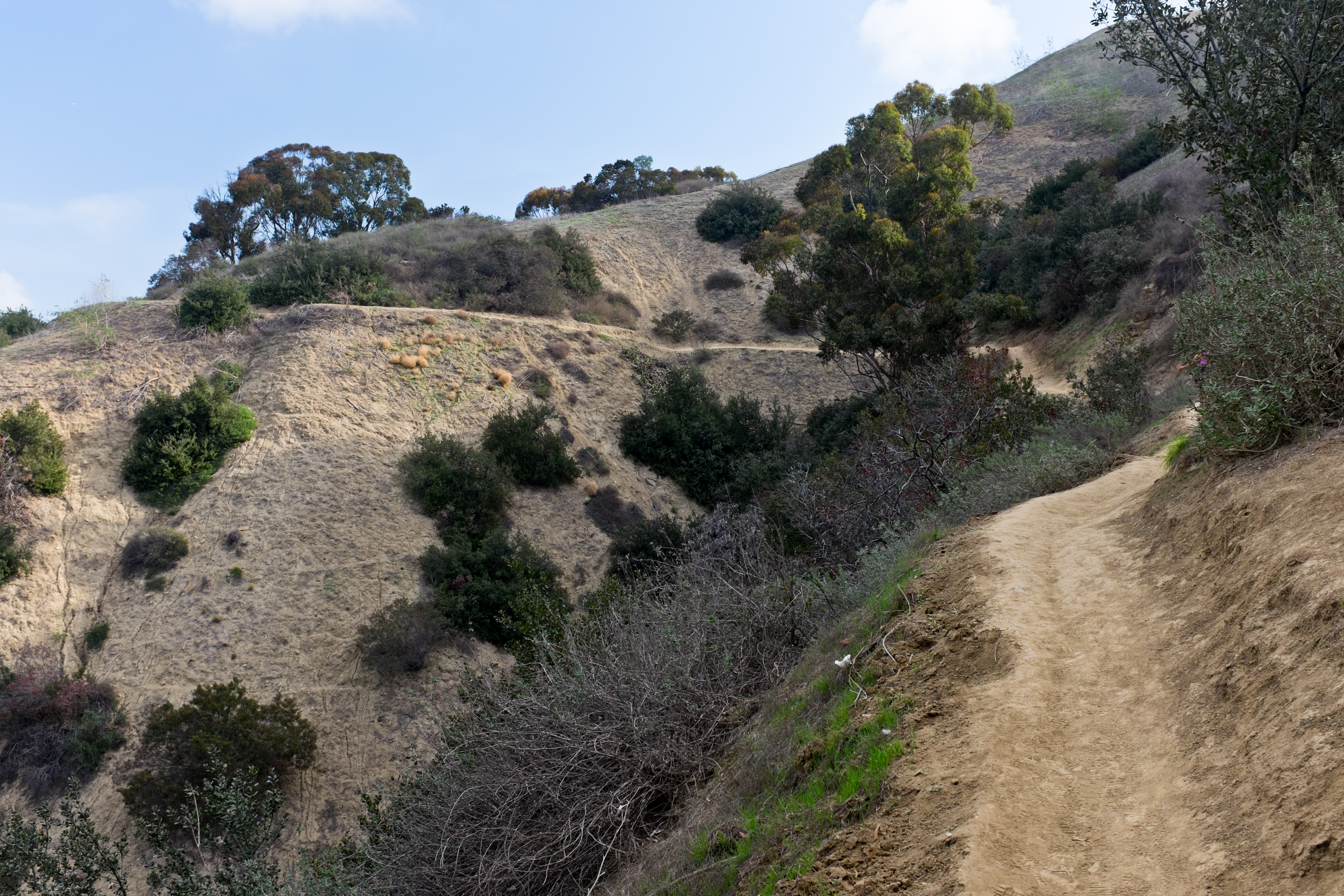
Puente Hills in Hellman Wilderness Park

== Landmarks ==
Rio Hondo College is located at the foot of the western end of the hills, and the Puente Hills Landfill is nearby, which was one of the largest landfills in the U.S. before shutting down in 2013. Rose Hills Memorial Park occupies portions of the northern area. The highest point in the western hills is Workman Hill, named for the pioneer Workman family. The Puente Hills Mall is located north of the hills. Hsi Lai Temple in Hacienda Heights, the largest Buddhist temple and monastery in the Western Hemisphere, is located in the hills.

== Parks ==
Puente Hills Native Habitat Preserve

Puente Hills is home to the Puente Hills Landfill, the country's largest landfill, which closed in 2013. The high-tech landfill has begun offering tours. The Puente Hills Landfill Native Habitat Preservation Authority directs the acquisition, restoration, and management of open space in the Puente Hills for preservation of the land to protect the biological diversity and provide opportunities for outdoor education and low-impact recreation, and scheduled hikes are offered.

Hellman Wilderness Park

Hellman Wilderness Park is located in the western Puente Hills ("Whittier Hills") with trailheads in Whittier. It is managed by the Puente Hills Habitat Preservation Authority. It has trails into native coastal sage scrub habitats, and up to vistas of the Los Angeles Basin.

Schabarum Regional Park

Schabarum Regional Park is partially in the eastern Puente Hills, in Rowland Heights, eastern Los Angeles County, California. It has equestrian and hiking trails in the hills.

== Oil drilling ==
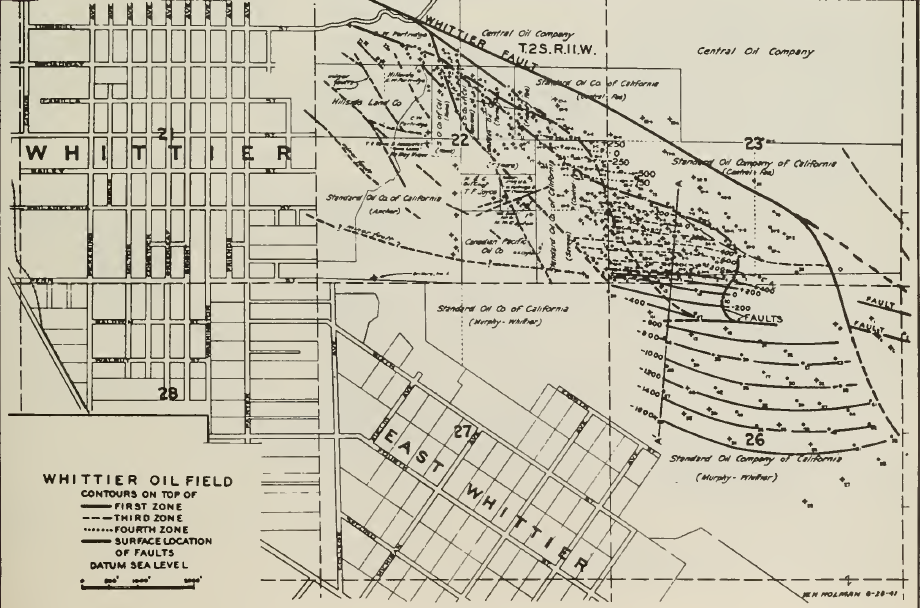
Whittier Oil Field structure map

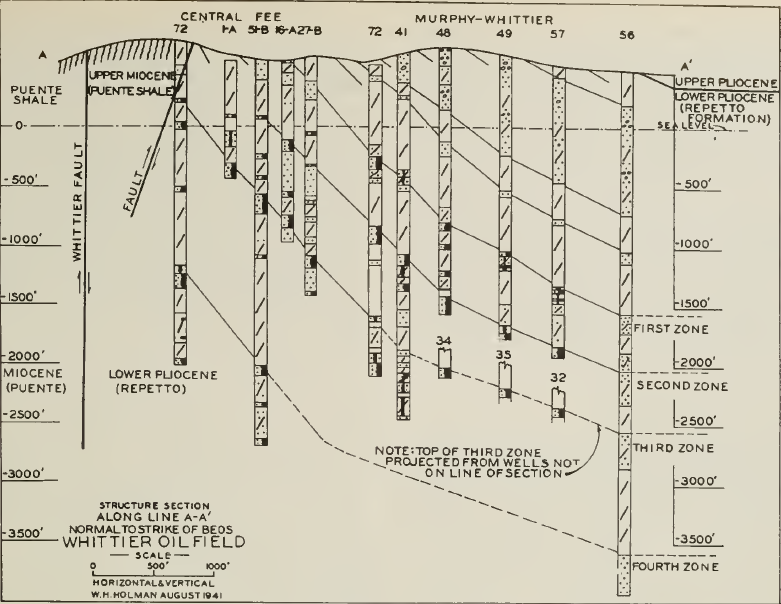
Whittier Oil Field geologic cross section

A commercial discovery was made in 1897, for what would become the Whittier Oil Field, when a well was drilled to a depth of 984 feet. The location was in the central area of production. By 1903, about 100 wells were in operation and by 1924, there were 163 commercial wells in operation.

There has been a long history of oil drilling in the Puente Hills. In the early 20th century, several companies drilled, including Simon Murphy's Murphy Oil Company. Recently, Matrix Oil has proposed resumption of oil drilling on several acres in the Puente Hills. Oil drilling began to decline in the Puente hills in the 1940s.

== History and legends ==
Powder Canyon, near La Habra Heights, was named after some explosion tests took place c. 1910 by a company experimenting in blasting powder. The venture failed during World War I, but the name remained.

In the early 1930s an unsuccessful high-voltage experiment was made at Turnbull Canyon (near Skyline Drive) in an attempt to create rain.

A Robin Airlines Curtiss C-46 passenger plane crashed in the Puente Hills near Turnbull Canyon, killing all 29 passengers on April 16, 1952.

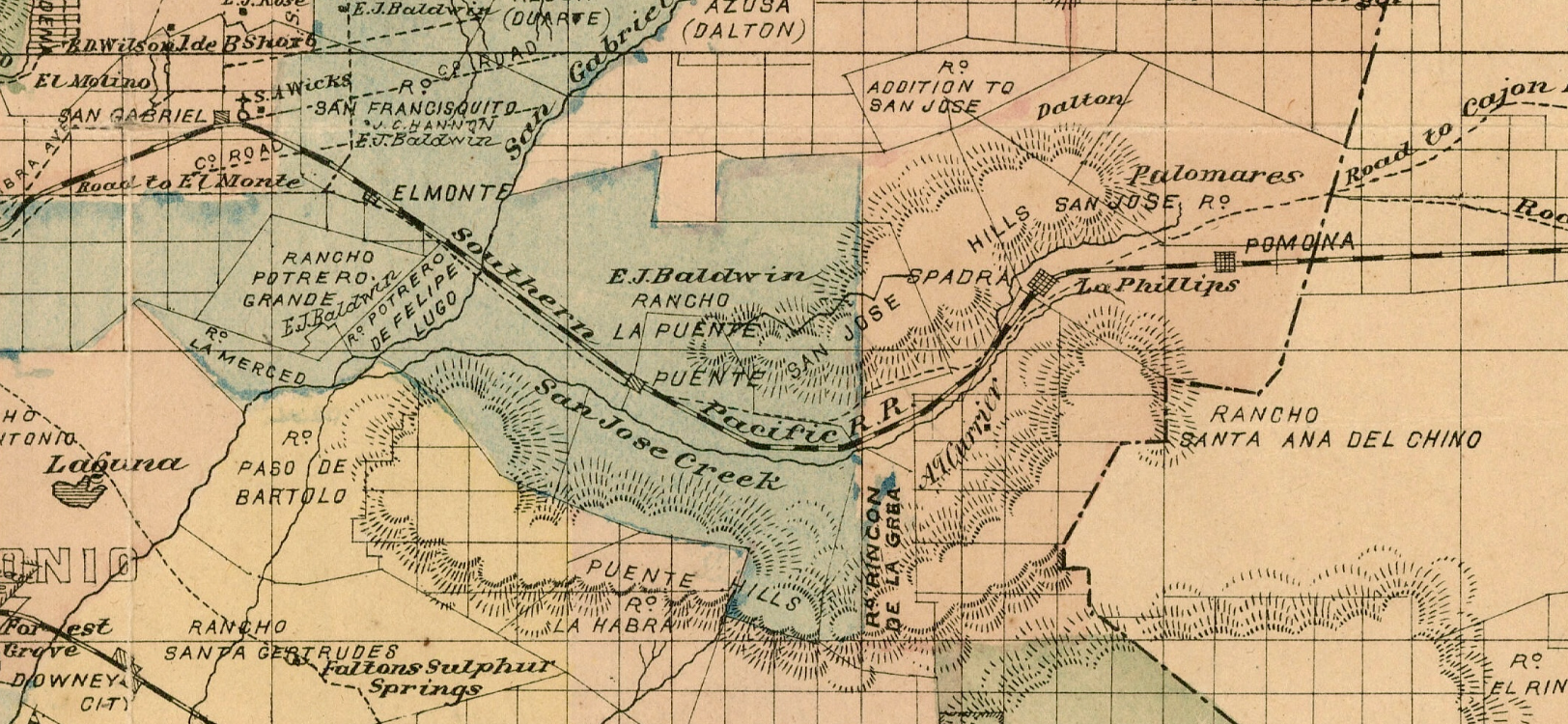
Puente Hills circa 1880

In the 1953 film adaptation of H. G. Wells' science-fiction novel The War of the Worlds, the Puente Hills was the location of an unsuccessful attempt to use a nuclear bomb against the Martian invaders.

It was one of the sites for Nike anti-aircraft missiles in the 1950s till the late 1960s.

In the 1985 film Back to the Future, Doc Brown introduces the iconic Delorean time machine in the parking lot of Puente Hills Mall.

The October 1987 Whittier Narrows Earthquake revealed a previously unrecognized fault line under the Puente Hills Area.

From the 1970s to the early 2000s a hillside letter with initials "L.A." were cemented on a hill in Hacienda Heights, (west of Palm Avenue and Beech Hill Avenue, bordering the Puente Hills Landfill). It was made by students from Los Altos High School. The letter has slowly disappeared over time.

== Nearby ranges ==
- Chino Hills
- San Rafael Hills
- San Gabriel Mountains
- Santa Ana Mountains
- Verdugo Mountains
- Turnbull Canyon

== See also ==
- Puente Hills Fault
