= Oxford University (disambiguation) =

The University of Oxford is a collegiate research university located in Oxford, England, founded c. 1096.

Oxford University may also refer to:

- Oxford University (UK Parliament constituency), university constituency to the British House of Commons from 1603 to 1950

== See also ==
- Oxford Brookes University, a public university in Oxford, England
- Oxford College of Emory University, an American two-year residential college in Oxford, Georgia
- Oxford College (disambiguation)
- Oxford High School (disambiguation)
- Oxford Academy (disambiguation)
- Oxford University College (disambiguation)
