= The Oxford School (Panama) =

International school in Panama City, Panama

Coordinates: 8.9915°N 79.5318°W

The Oxford School is a British international school in Panama City, Panama. The school, located in Edison Park on Via Transistmica, has over 1500 students as of 2026. It serves levels preschool through secondary school and also high school.

The Oxford School, then a supplementary English language school, opened in 1983 and opened a permanent facility in a Via España campus in 1984. The day school programme, initially Pre-Kindergarten through 1st grade, opened in a Punta Paitilla campus in 1990. The Santiago de Veraguas campus opened in 1992. Its current building opened in 1999.
