= John X. J. Zhang =

- 张晓晶
- Education: Shanghai Jiao Tong University (BSc) Stanford University (PhD)
- Scientific career
- Fields: Electrical Engineering, Biomedical Engineering
- Institutions: Dartmouth College
- Website: nanolitesystems.org

John X. J. Zhang (Chinese: 张晓晶; pinyin: Zhāng Xiǎojīng) is a tenured professor at Thayer School of Engineering of Dartmouth College and an investigator in the Dartmouth-Hitchcock Medical Center, specializing in research on cancer nanotechnology. Zhang was a recipient of the 2016 NIH Director's Transformative Research Award.
