= Turnbull Canyon =

Landform in Southern California

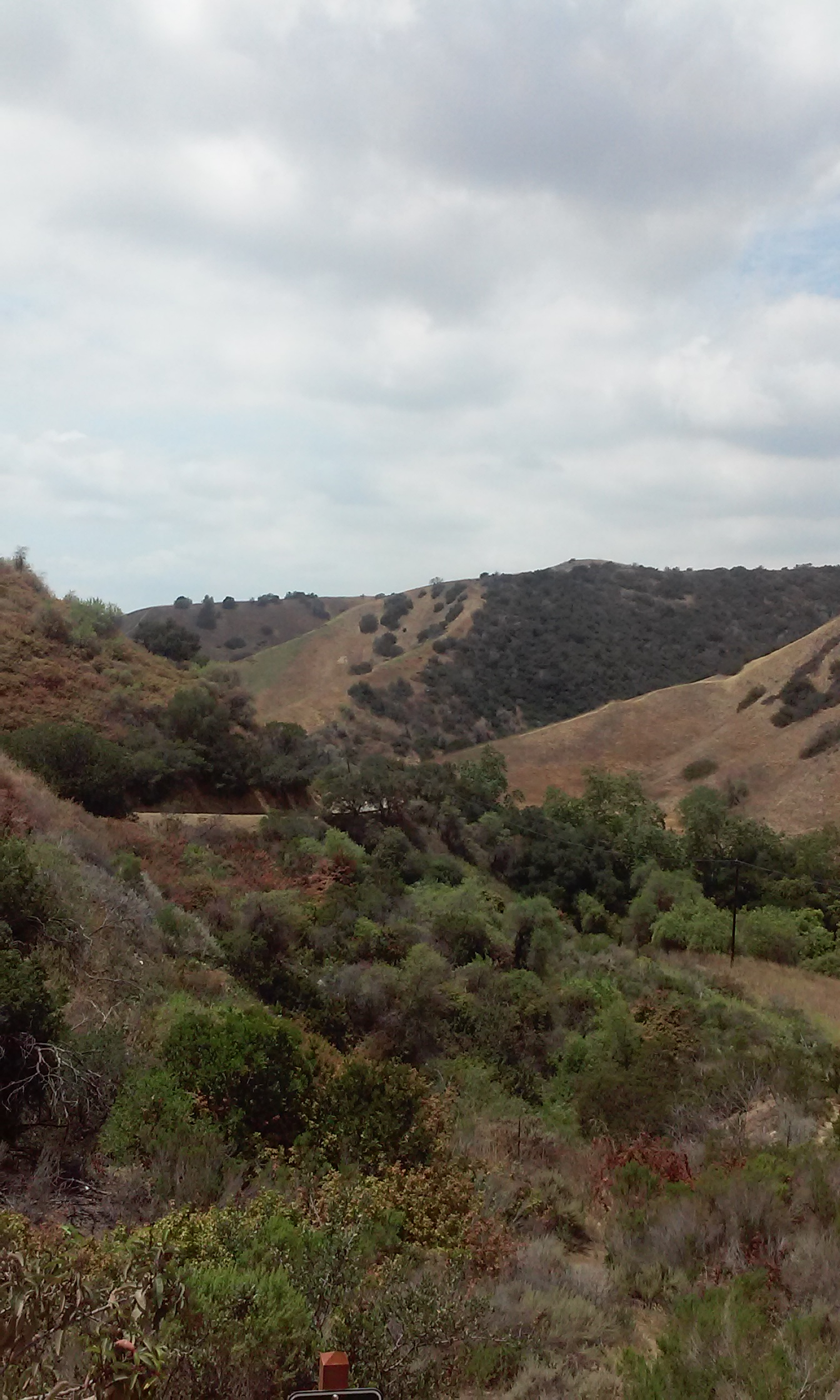
- Turnbull Canyon from Skyline Dr.

Highest point
- Peak: Skyline Drive
- Elevation: 242 m (794 ft)
- Coordinates: 33°59′35″N 118°00′51″W

Geography
- Location within California
- Country: United States
- State: California
- District: Los Angeles County
- Topo map: USGS Whittier, California

Turnbull Canyon near Whittier, California is an east–west canyon with relatively steep drainage. The canyon has a creek at its bottom that supports a narrow strip of riparian woodland dominated by sycamore trees, while the slopes are covered in coastal sage and native and non-native grasses. The Puente Hills Preserve has a 4-mile loop trail that lies in the northern-central part of the preserve.

== Climate ==
The climate in Turnbull Canyon is typical of Southern California, semi-arid. Because the Whittier Hills has a relatively close proximity to the ocean, which has an equalizing effect on the climate, it is somewhat cooler here than some of the areas just south of the region. During the winter months, it is not uncommon to see frost on the ground and during summer, it rarely gets hotter than 95 degrees.

== History ==
Turnbull Canyon was named after Scottish immigrant Robert Turnbull after buying the canyon from Quaker businessmen in Whittier in the 1870s to raise sheep. He later sold the land back to the Quakers in the 1880s for a profit. Turnbull's luck ran out after that; he became a town drunk and was murdered. The Quakers decided to name the canyon after Turnbull in his honor.

Oil exploration and drilling began to expand into Turnbull Canyon in the 1890s and a crude dirt road was constructed through the canyon. In November 1900, two oilmen in their wagon were chased out of the canyon by two large cougars as their horses panicked. By 1913, the road was paved for the first time for automobiles.

Since then, Turnbull Canyon has developed a strange collection of various myths and urban legends, including tragic murders.

== Attractions ==
Turnbull Canyon is known for the view it provides of the Hsi Lai Temple and Rose Hills Memorial Park.

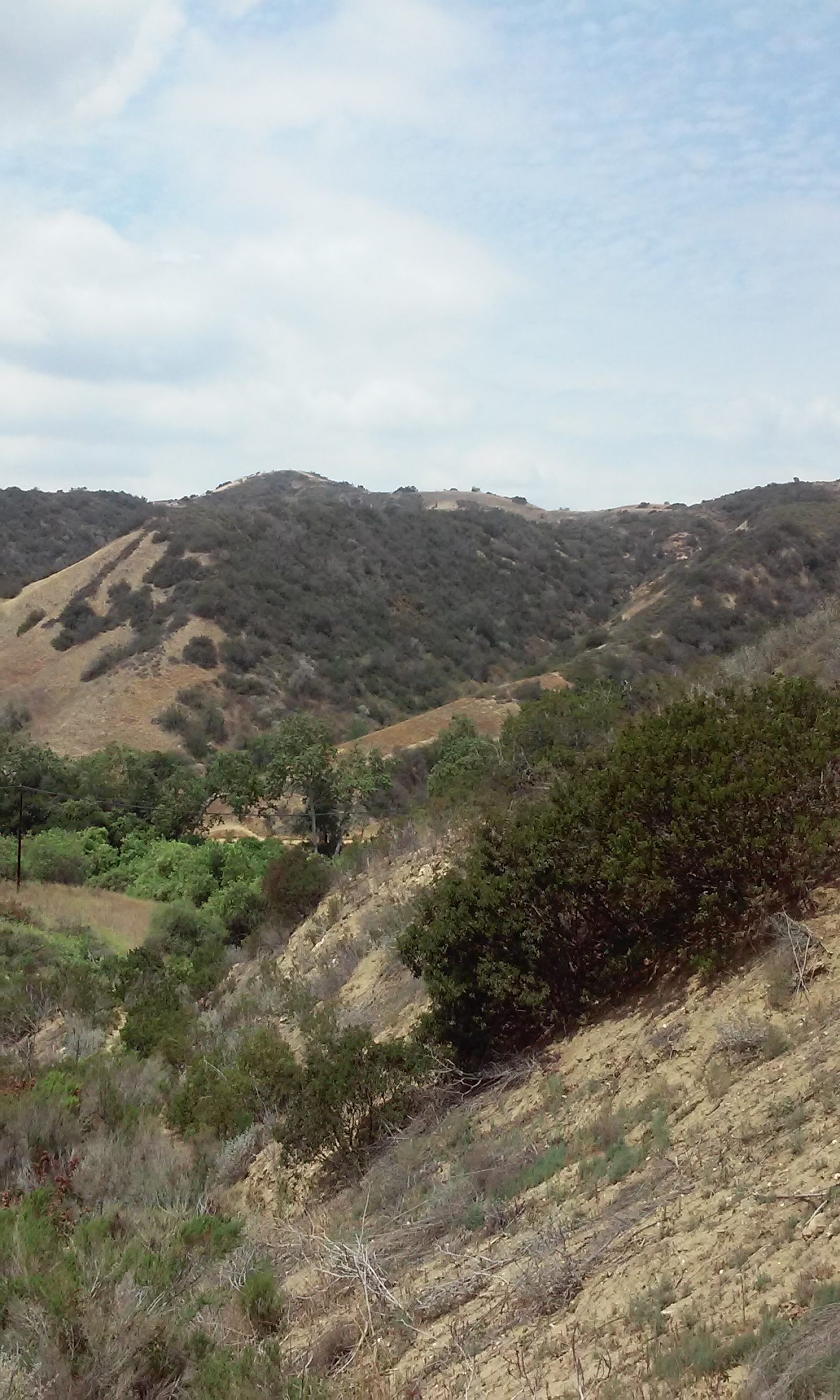

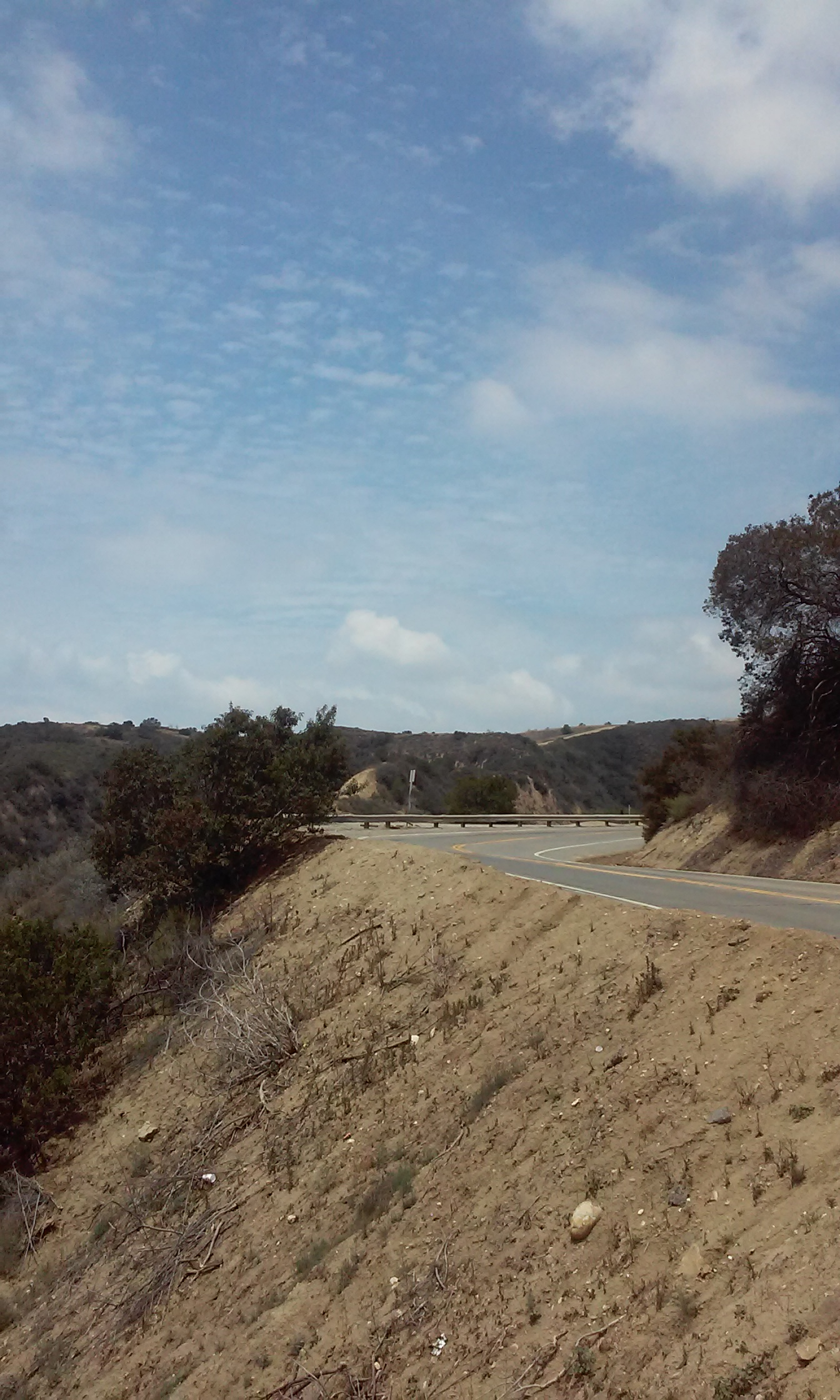

== See also ==
- San Gabriel Valley
- California Floristic Province
- California chaparral and woodlands
- Puente Hills topics
