= Oxford School (California) =

Private school in California, United States

Coordinates: 33.9863°N 117.8939°W

Oxford School was a private middle and high school in Rowland Heights, California. It serves grades 6-12. As of 2017 Scott Adams is the principal.

The school was founded in 1980 and has been at its current location since 1997. The school, located behind a strip mall, consists of multiple portable classrooms and a grass field with a soccer goal, basketball courts, and a badminton or volleyball net.

== Student body ==
As of 2016 it had about 140 international students, with Chinese nationals making up the majority. Most students stay with area families as part of "homestays", as their parents do not reside in the United States. Some homestays are arranged by the students' parents while others are established by Oxford School. The school employs a homestay coordinator.

== Athletics ==
The basketball team plays pickup games at an area park. It is not a part of any athletic league.
