= Smudge pot =

Oil-burning device used to prevent frost on fruit trees

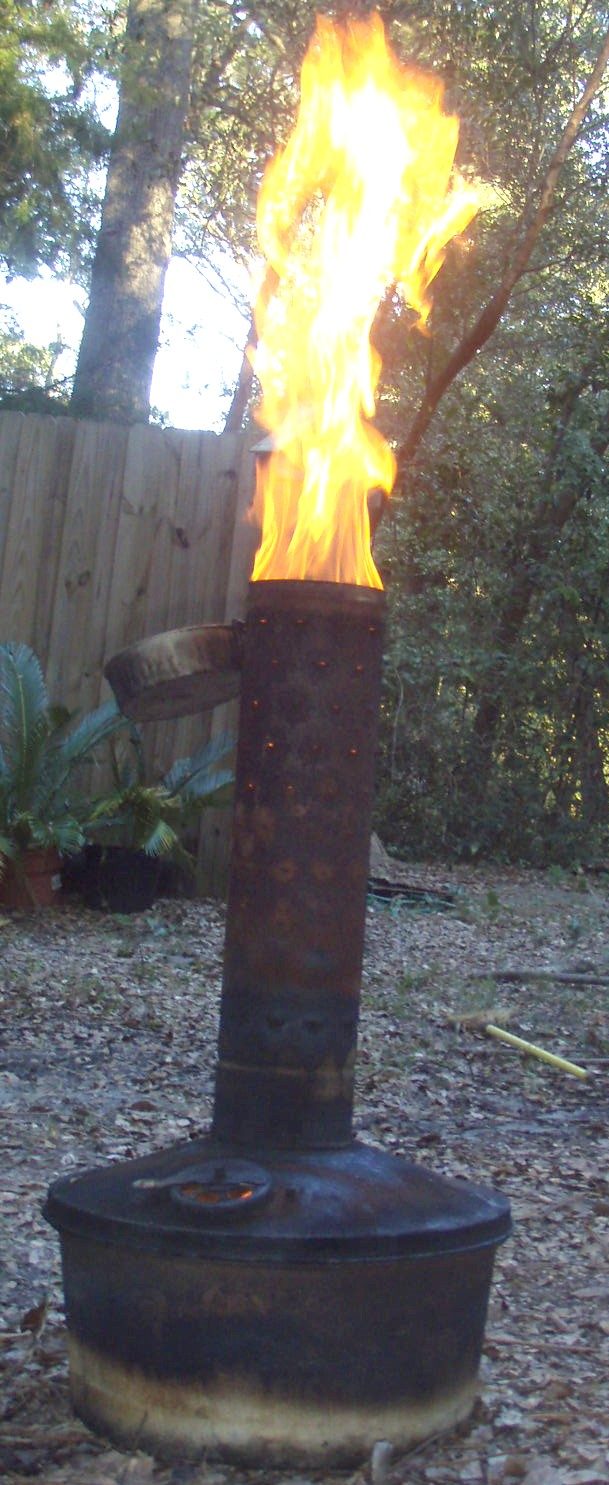
Smudge pot from Central Florida burning. It has been recently lit off, as the exhaust on a fully hot pot becomes almost invisible with a mere hint of red/orange flame. Note that the filler/flue cap is in the fully open position (all holes open).

A smudge pot (also known as a choofa or orchard heater) is an oil-burning device used to prevent frost on fruit trees. Usually, a smudge pot has a large round base with a chimney coming out of the middle of the base. The smudge pot is placed between trees in an orchard. The burning oil creates heat, smoke, carbon dioxide, and water vapor, and helps keep the orchard from cooling too much during the cold snaps.

Other uses include heating structures and equipment, as safety warnings, creating smokescreens, and rural runway lighting.

== History ==
In 1907, a young inventor, Willis Frederick Charles “W.C.” Scheu (December 1, 1868 – April 11, 1942), at that time in Grand Junction, Colorado, developed an oil-burning stack heater that was more effective than open fires in heating orchards and vineyards. In 1911, he opened Scheu Manufacturing Company in Upland, California, and began producing a line of orchard heaters. Scheu Steel is still in business. The use of smudge pots became widespread after a disastrous freeze in Southern California, January 4–8, 1913, wiped out a whole crop.

Smudge pots were commonly used for seven decades in areas such as California's numerous citrus groves and vineyards. The Redlands district had 462,000 orchard heaters for the winter of 1932–33, reported P. E. Simpson, of the supply department of the California Fruit Growers Exchange, requiring 3,693,000 gallons of oil for a single refilling, or about 330 tank-car loads. To fill all of the smudge pots in Southern California one time required 2,000 carloads.

Smudge pot use in Redlands, California groves continued into the 1970s, but fell out of favor as oil prices rose and environmental concerns increased. Pots came in two major styles: a single louvered stack above a fuel-oil–filled base, and a slightly taller version that featured a cambered, louvered neck and a galvanized re-breather feed pipe out of the side of the chimney that siphoned stack gas back into the burn chamber and produced more complete combustion. The return-stack heater was developed by the University of California and became commercially available about 1940. Filler caps have a three- or four-hole flue control. The stem into the pot usually has a piece of oil-soaked wood ("down-draft tube and wick") secured inside the neck to aid in lighting the pot. Pots are ignited when the air temperature reaches 29 °F (−2 °C), and for each additional degree of drop, another hole is opened on the control cap ("draft regulator"). Below 25 degrees, nothing more can be done to enhance the heating effects.

== Types ==
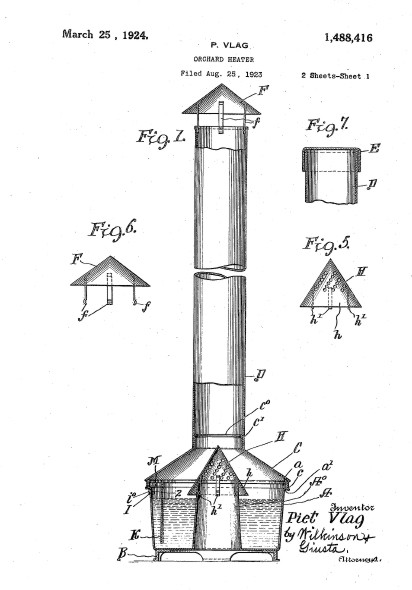
1924 patent diagram

Some groves used natural gas pots on lines from a gas source, but these are not smudge pots in the usual sense, and they represented only a fraction of the smudging practice. Experiments using natural gas heaters were conducted in Rialto, California, in 1912. Sometimes, large smudge pots are used for heating large open buildings, such as mechanics' workshops. In Australia they are called "choofers" because of the noise they make when lit: "choofa choofa choofa".

Lighting an Australian "choofer" is a tricky business. Because of the voluminous clouds of oily black smoke they produce when cold, they must be lit outside. This is accomplished by holding a burning rag next to the open damper on the fuel tank. The draught caused by the breeze passing through the chimney will draw air through the open damper into the fuel tank, where the surface of the fuel inside will light and burn instantly. Once the choofer is sufficiently warm, the damper may be closed until a steady rate of burning is attained, when the characteristic "choofa choofa choofa" noise is produced. If the damper is not closed, the choofa may choke itself with its own smoke, causing periodic "explosions" of unburnt gases in the chimney. Such explosions are not dangerous, but they are noisy and they produce a lot of smoke. Once the heater is burning hot enough, the smoke will disappear, and the pot may be dragged slowly and carefully inside. They still produce dangerous gas and must only be used in well-ventilated spaces.

Choofers will burn almost any combustible liquid fuel, including kerosene, diesel fuel, or used sump oil.

== Uses ==
In addition to heating orchards and buildings, smudge pots have had various other heating and safety applications:

- Prior to the development of battery-powered safety blinkers on sawhorses, many highway departments used small oil-burning safety pot markers, sometimes called a "highway torch", to denote work zones and warn oncoming traffic of traffic hazards.
- Many railroad systems still rely on oil-fired switch heaters, long tubs of fuel with wicks, that fit between the ties and keep snow and ice from fouling the points of a switch. This is generally only used in yard applications. Mainline switches are usually heated by natural gas heaters.
- For several decades (1920s–1970s) they were used as emergency night landing illumination at remote airfields without electric runway lights, acting as a series of small bonfires.
- Smudge pots were used by the Germans, the Japanese, and the United States Navy during World War II, and by the North Vietnamese in their invasions of Laos during the Vietnam War to protect valuable targets. The oily black clouds of smoke produced from these smudge pots was intended to limit the ability to locate a target. In Vietnam, smoke from smudge pots was used as a defense against laser-guided bombs. Smoke would diffuse the laser beam and break the laser's connection with its intended target.
- As trophies.
  - The smudge pot has become a symbolic prize in two Southern California high school football rivalries.
  - Bonita High School and San Dimas High School, affiliated with the Bonita Unified School District in Southern California, compete in varsity football for a silver-plated smudge pot.
  - In Redlands, California, Redlands High School and Redlands East Valley High School also compete in varsity football for a blue-and-red smudge pot. The game is known among football fans as the 'Smudge Bowl'
