= Lekkerkerker =

Lekkerkerker is a Dutch surname. Notable people with the surname include:

- Brad Lekkerkerker (born 1978), former American footballer (older brother of Cory Lekkerkerker)
- Cory Lekkerkerker (born 1981), former American footballer (younger brother of Brad Lekkerkerker)
- Gerrit Lekkerkerker (1922–1999), Dutch mathematician
