= Baseline League =

High school athletic conference in California

The Baseline League is a high school athletic conference that is part of the CIF Southern Section. Members are located in San Bernardino County, with Damien and St. Lucy's located in Los Angeles County. The Baseline League was formed in 1979, with original members Claremont High School, Glendora High School, Pomona High School, Chaffey High School, Damien High School, St. Lucy's Priory High School, Pomona Catholic Girl's High School, and Upland High School.

== Members ==
- Chino Hills High School
- Damien High School (all-boys school)
- Etiwanda High School
- Los Osos High School
- Rancho Cucamonga High School
- St. Lucy's Priory High School (all-girls school)
- Upland High School
