= Pomona Catholic High School =

Private, all-female school in Pomona, California, United States

Location
- 533 East Holt Avenue; Pomona, (Los Angeles County), California 91768; United States; 34°3′45″N 117°45′29″W

Information
- Type: Private, All-Female
- Motto: "When you educate a woman you educate a generation"
- Religious affiliation: Roman Catholic
- Established: 1898
- Dean: Allison Essman
- Principal: Rebecca Arteaga
- Faculty: 14
- Grades: 6-12
- Enrollment: 264 (2008)
- Colors: Forest Green and White
- Athletics: Volleyball, softball, track and field, soccer, basketball, cheer, golf, cross country, water polo, swim, lacrosse, wrestling and tennis
- Mascot: Pacer
- Team name: Pacers
- Accreditation: Western Association of Schools and Colleges
- Website: Official website

Pomona Catholic High School is a private, Roman Catholic, co-ed middle school and all-girls high school in Pomona, California, established in 1898. It is located in the Roman Catholic Archdiocese of Los Angeles. It is a part of the tri-school community existing between St. Lucy's Priory High School and Damien High School.

== History ==
Holy Name Academy, a boarding high school for girls, located on Holt Avenue in Pomona, California, closed its doors in June 1948. In September of that year, it was reopened by Monsignor English, pastor of St. Joseph's Church, as a high school for both boys and girls of the parish and surrounding parishes. Newly staffed by the Felician Sisters, it was re-named St. Joseph High School then after a few years changed the name to Pomona Catholic High School. It continues to provide Catholic education for students who come from as far as Riverside on the east and Baldwin Park in the west. In response to serious overcrowding, the Archdiocese of Los Angeles took advantage of the sale of the old Bonita High School facility in 1959 and split Pomona Catholic into two schools. Pomona Catholic Boys High School (now Damien High School) opened in nearby La Verne in 1959 to freshman boys only. The last boys graduated from the original Pomona Catholic High School in 1962. Currently, Pomona Catholic School consists of a co-ed middle school and an all-girls high school.

== Notable alumni ==
- Ron Kadziel, former NFL player
- Debbie Mucarsel-Powell, U.S. Representative from Florida
- Karen Seto, Yale University Professor and a lead author on two UN climate change reports.
- John Stewart, member of The Kingston Trio (1961-1967), composer of “Daydream Believer”
- Geoff Vanderstock, Olympic track athlete
- Cisco Carlos, professional baseball player
- Marie Royce, U.S. Assistant Secretary of State for Education and Cultural Affair. It is a tri-school with Saint Lucy high school and Damien High school

== See also ==
- Damien High School
