= Sierra League =

- Sierra League (Nevada) - a high school athletic conference in Nevada
- Palomares League - the successor to a high school conference in California previously known as the Sierra League
