= Decker DeGraaf =

American football player

No. 86 – Washington Huskies
- Position: Tight end
- Class: Junior

Personal information
- Born: May 4, 2006 (age 20)
- Listed height: 6 ft 4 in (1.93 m)
- Listed weight: 249 lb (113 kg)

Career information
- High school: San Dimas (San Dimas, California); Glendora (Glendora, California)
- College: Washington (2024–present)
- Stats at ESPN

Decker DeGraaf is an American college football tight end for the Washington Huskies.

== Early life ==
DeGraaf is from San Dimas, California. He first attended San Dimas High School before transferring to Glendora High School as a sophomore. He only played five games for Glendora that year due to transfer rules, but DeGraaf caught eight passes for 142 yards and two touchdowns in his debut and became a highly recruited tight end prospect. He was named All-CIF Southern Section Division 7 as a junior and was first-team all-league and the Citrus 4 League Offensive MVP as a senior in 2023. In his last season, he was Glendora's leading receiver and caught 57 passes for 993 yards and 11 touchdowns. A three-star recruit, he committed to play college football for the Washington Huskies.

== College career ==
DeGraaf enrolled early at Washington, traveling to their appearance in the 2024 College Football Playoff National Championship. Due to injuries, he saw significant playing time as a true freshman for the Huskies in 2024. He was the team's main pass-catching tight end and finished the season with 15 receptions for 233 yards and three touchdowns, leading the team with an average of 15.5 yards-per-catch. For his performance, he was named a consensus first-team Freshman All-American.
