= Brad Lekkerkerker =

American football player (born 1978)

No. 75
- Position: Offensive tackle

Personal information
- Born: May 8, 1978 (age 48); Chino, California, U.S.
- Listed height: 6 ft 7 in (2.01 m)
- Listed weight: 330 lb (150 kg)

Career information
- High school: Damien (La Verne, California)
- College: Chaffey JC (2000–2001); UC Davis (2002–2003)
- NFL draft: 2004: undrafted

Career history
- Houston Texans (2004)*; Oakland Raiders (2004–2005)
- * Offseason or practice squad member only

Career NFL statistics
- Games played: 1
- Stats at Pro Football Reference

Brad Lekkerkerker (born May 8, 1978) is an American former professional football player who was an offensive tackle in the National Football League (NFL). From Chino, California, he grew up on his family's dairy farm and did not play high school football. He played college football for the Chaffey Panthers and UC Davis Aggies. After going unselected in the 2004 NFL draft, Lekkerkerker signed with the Houston Texans as an undrafted free agent. He later was a member of the Oakland Raiders from 2004 until his retirement in 2006, appearing in one NFL game. His younger brother, Cory Lekkerkerker, also played as an offensive tackle in the NFL.

== Early life ==
Lekkerkerker was born on May 8, 1978, in Chino, California. His grandparents were immigrants from the Netherlands. He grew up in Chino and has a younger brother, Cory, who also played in the NFL. His father died of cancer when he was age nine. After his father's death, he helped run the family's dairy farm, which included 2,000 cows. Lekkerkerker and his brother both attended Damien High School in La Verne, but only Cory played football there, as Brad ran the family farm. In 1996, he graduated from Damien.

== College career ==
In 2000, following after his brother, Lekkerkerker enrolled at Chaffey College and began playing football for the first time. The Sacramento Bee noted that the first time he ever tried to line up in a three-point stance, he nearly fell down. Nevertheless, as an offensive tackle, he became one of the top-100 ranked junior college players and was a Junior College All-American as a sophomore, while Chaffey won 19 of 22 games in two seasons with the Lekkerkerker brothers. He and his brother started all 22 of those games, one at left tackle and the other at right tackle. The brothers received attention from several NCAA Division I schools, but they both transferred to the NCAA Division II-level UC Davis Aggies in 2002. Brad had initially received an offer to play for the Ohio State Buckeyes, but they retracted their offer upon learning his age and that he would only be eligible for one Division I season due to having attended Chaffey for a semester in 1996.

Lekkerkerker and his brother were teammates at UC Davis from 2002 to 2003. As a college junior, he stood at 6 feet 7 inches (2.01 m) and weighed 310 pounds (140 kg), while his brother was 6 feet 6 inches (1.98 m) and 300 pounds (140 kg), earning the two the nickname the "Brothers Large". The Bee described them as like twins and noted, "They sound alike, in tone and in beliefs. They are quiet and shy by nature, but brutish and unforgiving in shoulder pads." The two brothers started together as offensive tackles for the Aggies in 2003. In total, Lekkerkerker played 22 games at UC Davis, 12 as a starter. At the conclusion of his collegiate career, he played in the East–West Shrine Bowl.

== Professional career ==
Lekkerkerker was invited to the NFL Scouting Combine and worked out with the Chicago Bears and New England Patriots prior to the 2004 NFL draft; some sources projected him as a potential sixth- or seventh-round pick. He went unselected in the draft and afterwards signed with the Houston Texans as an undrafted free agent. He was released by the Texans on August 31, 2004, then signed with the Oakland Raiders practice squad on September 7, where he remained for the rest of the season. He re-signed with the Raiders on January 4, 2005, but was released on September 3, 2005, after which he re-signed with the practice squad. On November 26, he was promoted to the active roster after Warren Sapp was placed on injured reserve. He appeared in only one game, a Week 17 loss to the New York Giants. During the 2005 season, the Raiders twice played against the San Diego Chargers, who had Brad's brother Cory on their roster, although the brothers did not play in the games. After initially re-signing with the Raiders in 2006, Lekkerkerker was placed on the reserve/retired list on July 25, 2006, ending his professional career.

After his playing career, Lekkerkerker lived in Bakersfield, California, and became an almond farmer.
