= William Saito =

- Born: William Hiroyuki Saito; March 23, 1971 (age 55); Los Angeles, California U.S.
- Occupations: Businessman; Venture capitalist
- Website: William Saito

William Hiroyuki Saito (齋藤ウィリアム浩幸; born March 23, 1971) is a Japanese American businessman, venture capitalist and former advisor to the government of Japan specializing in cybersecurity.

He had appeared in the Japanese media as a physician, a start-up investor, and cybersecurity expert educated in the US. But in 2017 he resigned from all public and several private sector positions, after the falsification and misrepresentation of his career was reported, including the medical license and the degree of UCLA.

== Early life and education ==
Saito was born in Los Angeles, California; his parents immigrated to the US from Japan in 1969, two years before he was born. He is the eldest of three children.

In 1987, Saito graduated from Damien High School in La Verne, California. He attended the University of California, Riverside from the Fall of 1988 to the Fall 1992, and was a student in Riverside's joint Biomedical Science Program with the University of California, Los Angeles in 1988.

== Career ==
When Saito was a junior in high school, he started a business in computer security. He later established the company as I/O Software in 1991 when he was a student. Among other technologies, I/O Software developed a system to display Japanese characters in software written in English, and a fingerprint recognition system used by Sony. Microsoft began a partnership with I/O Software in 2000 to adopt the latter's authentication technology in future versions of Microsoft Windows. Saito sold the I/O Software business assets to Microsoft in 2004.

After selling the I/O Software business, he moved to Japan, where he became active as a venture capitalist and invested in several Japanese start-ups. He was named a Young Global Leader of the World Economic Forum in 2011.

Saito was an advisor to Prime Minister Shinzo Abe on cybersecurity issues. Saito accompanied Abe on a 2015 visit to Silicon Valley, where Abe met with the heads of several major technology firms. He was a cybersecurity advisor to the Cabinet Office from 2013 and an advisor to the Ministry of Economy, Trade and Industry until revelations that led to his admission that he misrepresented his education and academic degrees came to light and he resigned these and other posts in 2017.

In May 2019, Saito took a legal action in the Tokyo regional court against Kodansha which published the Shukan Gendai magazine (published on 3 March 2018). Kodansha paid a settlement and deleted the article at the request of the court.

== Works and publications ==
- An Unprogrammed Life: Adventures of an Incurable Entrepreneur. Singapore: Wiley. 2012. ISBN 978-1-118-07727-6. OCLC 778431581.
- ザ・チーム: 日本の一番大きな問題を解く / Za chīmu: nihon no ichiban ōkina mondai o toku. Tokyo: Nikkei BP. 2012. ISBN 978-4-822-24924-3. OCLC 812155963.
- その考え方は、「世界標準」ですか？ / Sono kangaekata wa, "sekai hyōjun" desu ka?. Tokyo: Daiwa Shobo. 2013. ISBN 978-4-479-79372-4.
- IoTは日本企業への警告である / IoT wa nihon kigyō e no keikoku de aru. Tokyo: Diamond-sha. 2015. ISBN 978-4-478-06745-1.
- ザ・チェンジ・メイカー / The Change Maker. Tokyo: Nikkei Publishing. 2016. ISBN 978-4-532-32055-3.
- 超初心者のためのサイバーセキュリティ入門 / Chō shoshinsha no tame no saibāsekyuriti nyūmon. Tokyo: Bunshun Shinsho. 2016. ISBN 978-4-166-61097-6.
- 世界一の会議 ダボス会議の秘密 / Sekaiichi no kaigi Dabosu kaigi no himitsu. Tokyo: Kodansha Plus Alpha Shinsho. 2017. ISBN 978-4-062-72978-9.
