= Bonita High School =

Location
- 3102 D Street; La Verne, California 91750; United States; 34°06′34″N 117°45′54″W

Information
- Type: Comprehensive, public
- Established: 1903
- School district: Bonita Unified School District
- Superintendent: Carl Coles
- Principal: Kenny Ritchie
- Teaching staff: 72.90 (on an FTE basis)
- Grades: 9–12
- Enrollment: 1,911 (2024–25)
- Student to teacher ratio: 26.21
- Colors: Green and white
- Athletics conference: Palomares League
- Mascot: Bearcat
- Nickname: Bearcats
- Rival: San Dimas High School
- Accreditation: Western Association of Schools and Colleges
- Newspaper: The Paw Print
- Yearbook: Echoes
- Website: School website

Bonita High School is a high school located in the city of La Verne, California, United States, in the foothills of the San Gabriel Mountains. Opened in 1903, it was the first high school in the Bonita Unified School District. It moved to its current campus in 1959. The majority of its students come from Ramona Middle School, which is also located in La Verne. The Bearcat athletic teams compete in the Palomares League of the CIF Southern Section.

== History ==
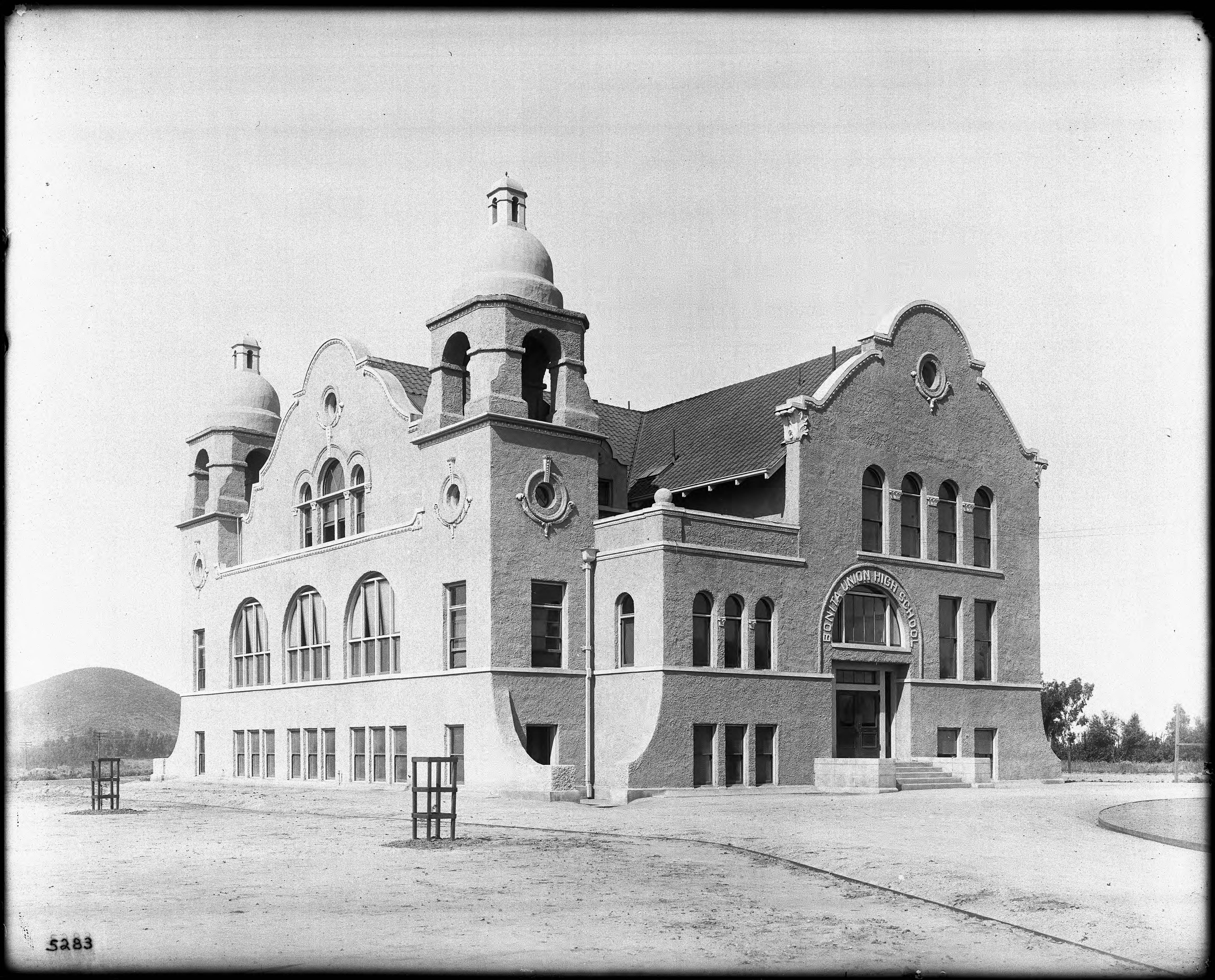
Bonita Union High School c.1903

In 1903, high school classes started on the second floor of a La Verne store. The classes were quickly moved to the building of nearby La Verne Public School (now La Verne Heights Elementary). Two teachers helped open Bonita Union High School, the first school in the Bonita Unified School District, that fall. In 1905, the school relocated to a two-story Mission-style building on Bonita Avenue. The size of the school was expanded to 23 acres in 1922.

In 1959, due to the overcrowding of the school, the school was sold to the Catholic Church and opened as Damien High School. Bonita moved to D Street, where the current campus still stands. The school celebrated its 100-year anniversary in 2003.

== Recognition ==
In 1996 and 2003, Bonita was recognized as a California Distinguished School for its excellence in Academics, Athletics, and the Arts, with a California Standardized Testing (CST) rating of 846 (the California standard is 1000 with a score of 800 considered excellent).

== Arts ==
The Bonita band programs include a jazz band, concert band, marching band, color guard, winter guard, and indoor percussion.

== Notable alumni ==
- Ewell Blackwell (1921–1996), former MLB player (Cincinnati Reds, New York Yankees, Kansas City Athletics)
- Cliff Bleszinski (born 1975), video game designer, former design director for Epic Games, founder of Boss Key Productions, known for his role in the development of the Unreal franchise and the Gears of War franchise
- Glenn Davis (1924–2005), professional football player; Heisman Trophy winner; West Point graduate; special events director for the Los Angeles Times
- Kevin Flora (born 1969) former MLB player (California Angels, Philadelphia Phillies)
- Jason David Frank (1973–2022), actor, martial artist and professional mixed martial arts fighter, best known for playing Tommy Oliver in Power Rangers
- Justin Garza (born 1994), MLB player (Cleveland Indians, Boston Red Sox)
- Gordon Goodwin (born 1954), studio pianist, saxophonist, composer, arranger and conductor; leads Gordon Goodwin's Big Phat Band
- Erin Gruwell (born 1969), unorthodox high school teacher, author, and main character in the 2007 movie Freedom Writers
- Adam McCreery (born 1992), former MLB player (Atlanta Braves)
- Jeremy Reed (born 1981), former MLB player (Seattle Mariners, New York Mets, Toronto Blue Jays, Milwaukee Brewers).
- Earl Smith (1928–2014), former MLB player (Pittsburgh Pirates)
- Matt Wise (born 1975), former MLB player (Anaheim Angels, Milwaukee Brewers, New York Mets)
