= Cory Lekkerkerker =

American football player (born 1981)

No. 71, 66
- Position: Offensive tackle

Personal information
- Born: July 25, 1981 (age 45); Upland, California, U.S.
- Listed height: 6 ft 7 in (2.01 m)
- Listed weight: 323 lb (147 kg)

Career information
- High school: Damien (La Verne, California)
- College: Chaffey (2000–2001); UC Davis (2002–2004)
- NFL draft: 2005: undrafted

Career history
- San Diego Chargers (2005–2006); Miami Dolphins (2007); Dallas Cowboys (2008)*; Tennessee Titans (2009)*; California Redwoods (2009)
- * Offseason or practice squad member only

Awards and highlights
- First-team All-Great West Conference (2004); Second-team All-Foothill Conference (2001)

Career NFL statistics
- Games played: 26
- Games started: 2
- Stats at Pro Football Reference

Cory Lekkerkerker (born July 25, 1981) is an American former professional football player who was an offensive tackle for two seasons in the National Football League (NFL) with the San Diego Chargers and Miami Dolphins. He played college football for the Chaffey Panthers and UC Davis Aggies and was signed by the Chargers as an undrafted free agent in 2005. He played for the Chargers in 2006 and then for the Dolphins in 2007. He later was a member of the Dallas Cowboys and Tennessee Titans in the NFL and the California Redwoods in the United Football League (UFL). His elder brother, Brad Lekkerkerker, also played as an offensive tackle in the NFL.

== Early life ==
Lekkerkerker was born on July 25, 1981, in Upland, California. His grandparents were immigrants from the Netherlands. He grew up in Chino and has an older brother, Brad, who also played in the NFL. His father died of cancer when he was age six. Lekkerkerker and his brother worked on the family's dairy farm, which included 2,000 cows. They both attended Damien High School in La Verne, where Cory played football as a lineman and was selected All-Sierra League in his senior year. He graduated in 2000.

== College career ==
Lekkerkerker enrolled at Chaffey College in 2000, where he was joined by his brother Brad on the football team. The two started every game, one at right tackle and the other at left tackle, in their two years at Chaffey. During that time, the team won 19 of 22 games played. Lekkerkerker was selected second-team All-Foothill Conference while at Chaffey. The brothers received attention from several NCAA Division I schools, with the Oklahoma State Cowboys and Sacramento State Hornets sending offers to Cory. Lekkerkerker eventually transferred to the NCAA Division II-level UC Davis Aggies to join his brother, who signed there after an offer from the Ohio State Buckeyes was rescinded.

The Lekkerkerker brothers were teammates at UC Davis from 2002 to 2003. In 2002, Cory stood at 6 feet 6 inches (1.98 m) and weighed 300 pounds (140 kg), while Brad was 6 feet 7 inches (2.01 m) and 310 pounds (140 kg), earning the two the nickname the "Brothers Large". The Sacramento Bee described them as like twins and noted, "They sound alike, in tone and in beliefs. They are quiet and shy by nature, but brutish and unforgiving in shoulder pads." Cory redshirted in 2002, and the two then started together as offensive tackles for the Aggies in 2003. Lekkerkerker was named the winner of the Jim Ferrier Award as the school's most outstanding transfer in 2003. He played with the Aggies until 2004, while his brother graduated following the 2003 season. In his last year, 2004, he was named first-team All-Great West Conference. He started all 10 games during the 2003 and 2004 seasons, helping the Aggies compile a record of 6–4 in 2004.

== Professional career ==
After going unselected in the 2005 NFL draft, Lekkerkerker signed with the San Diego Chargers as an undrafted free agent. He was released on September 3, 2005, then re-signed to the practice squad two days later. He was promoted to the active roster on November 5. He was active for one game, but did not see any playing time. During the 2005 season, the Chargers twice played the Oakland Raiders, who had Cory's brother Brad on the roster, although the two did not play in either game. He made the Chargers final roster in 2006 as a backup offensive tackle and guard, seeing action in 15 games, none as a starter. The 2006 Chargers compiled a record of 14–2 before losing in the divisional round of the playoffs to the New England Patriots. Lekkerkerker was released by the Chargers on September 1, 2007.

After being released by the Chargers, Lekkerkerker was claimed off waivers by the Miami Dolphins. He appeared in 11 games for the Dolphins, two as a starter, as the team compiled a record of 1–15. He became a free agent after the season and was not re-signed by Miami. On May 14, 2008, he signed with the Dallas Cowboys, before being released on August 30. Lekkerkerker was selected by the California Redwoods in the UFL premiere season draft in June 2009, but instead signed with the Tennessee Titans. He was released by the Titans on September 5 and later joined the Redwoods on October 26, appearing in one game for them. He did not play in 2010 and concluded his career with 26 NFL games played, two as a starter.

After his playing career, Lekkerkerker lived in Orange County, California, and became an almond farmer.
