= Damien High School =

Location
- 2280 Damien Avenue; La Verne, (Los Angeles County), California 91750; USA
- Coordinates: 34°6′18″N 117°47′18″W

Information
- Type: Private, All-Boys
- Motto: Cor Unum et Anima Una (One heart and One spirit)
- Religious affiliation: Roman Catholic
- Patron saint: Saint Damien
- Established: 1959
- President: Joseph Siegmund
- Principal: Mike Castillo
- Teaching staff: 54.0 (on an FTE basis)
- Grades: 9-12
- Enrollment: 928 (2017–18)
- Student to teacher ratio: 17.2
- Colors: Green and Gold
- Mascot: Spartan
- Team name: Spartans
- Rival: Claremont High School
- Accreditation: Western Association of Schools and Colleges, Western Catholic Educational Association
- Newspaper: The Laconian
- Yearbook: The Spartiate
- Tuition: $8,100
- Website: www.damien-hs.edu

Damien High School is an all-boys Roman Catholic high school in La Verne, in the U.S. state of California, named for Saint Damien of Molokai. It is located in and operated by the Roman Catholic Archdiocese of Los Angeles, part of the tri-school community including St. Lucy's Priory High School and Pomona Catholic High School.

== History ==
When Holy Names Academy, a Pomona boarding school for girls, closed in 1949, the Msgr. Thomas P. English reopened it as Pomona Catholic High School, staffed by the Felician Sisters. In 1959, the school moved to the former Bonita High School campus and became Pomona Catholic Boys High School.

In 1967, the school changed its name to Damien High School, in honor of St. Damien de Veuster, SS.CC., who had ministered to Hawaiians with leprosy (Hansen's disease) from 1873 for the rest of his life. Damien was canonized as a saint by Pope Benedict XVI on Sunday October 11, 2009.

The Sacred Heart Fathers have staffed and administered the school since its beginning in La Verne. The courage and capacity for self-sacrifice in the cause of others, is encouraged as an impetus toward social causes in the lives of Damien's students.

In 1996, a new swimming pool and locker room were constructed. Six new tennis courts were also built near the priests' residence and a new ticket/snack bar/rest room facility was built in Spartan Stadium. A new gymnasium, The Travers Cronin Athletic Center, was opened in 2006. In 2008, the Spartan Stadium was renovated. It now includes an all weather track and FieldTurf. Spartan Stadium was renamed "Dick Larson Stadium" in honor of the school's longtime football coach. 2010 brought a renovation of the football stadium, including the installation of a new scoreboard and stadium seating. The stadium was officially named "Tom Carroll Stadium," in honor of Damien's Athletic Director of 37 years.

Damien is a member of the Baseline League. They were previous members of the Palomares League.

In 2014, Damien and St. Lucy's Priory High School were moved from the Sierra League, where they had competed since 1998, to the Baseline League. The League consists of Damien/St. Lucy's, Chino Hills, Etiwanda, Los Osos, Rancho Cucamonga, and Upland.

In 2015, the basketball team won the California Interscholastic Federation State championship (Division III) by defeating Campolindo High of Moraga (CIF North Coast Section) by the score of 70-57 at Haas Pavilion on the campus of the University of California, Berkeley.

== Admissions ==
Each of Damien's freshmen classes draws from an average of over 75 different elementary and junior high schools for youths from Los Angeles and San Bernardino counties.

== School activities ==
=== Policy Debate Team ===
The Damien Policy Debate team won the 2009 National Debate Coach's Association National Championship, the 2009 National Forensic League National Tournament, and the inaugural Unger Cup, the award given to the "nation's most successful high school debate squad." Damien qualified 4 teams to the TOC in 2009, more than any other school in the nation. A school team won the National Debate Coaches Association (NDCA) Tournament, in 2011, making Damien the first school to win the NDCA twice.

=== Student Spaceflight Experiments Program ===
Damien High School was one of 23 communities involved with Student Spaceflight Experiment Program (SSEP's) Mission 7 to send a science experiment to the International Space Station. The experiment was originally aboard the SpaceX-7 rocket launched on June 28, 2015 which exploded 2 minutes into launch. The experiment was successfully re-flown on the SpaceX CRS-8 (SpaceX Falcon 9 rocket; Dragon spacecraft) on April 8, 2016, and docked with the International Space Station two days later. The experiment studies the effects of tardigrades in a microgravity environment.

== Tri-School Community ==
Damien High School is a part of the "tri-school" community existing between St. Lucy's Priory High School and Pomona Catholic High School. Numerous dances and functions are coordinated between the three schools during the school year. Additionally, financial incentives exist for parents who have multiple children attending these schools.

== Notable alumni ==
- David Bañuelos, professional baseball player
- Buckethead (né Brian Carroll), guitarist, musician, composer
- Chukwudi Chijindu, professional soccer player (Chivas USA)
- Casey Dailey, former NFL football player
- Nick Davila, professional football player (Arizona Rattlers); ArenaBowl XXV Champion
- Rick Davis, retired professional soccer player (New York Cosmos); captain of the 1984 Olympic soccer team
- Bill Duffy, sports agent
- Brian Dunseth, retired professional soccer player; television commentator
- Joe Franchino, retired professional soccer player
- Bobby Fresques, former professional football player and football coach
- Mike Hunter, retired professional soccer player
- Sheldon Jackson, retired professional football player (Buffalo Bills)
- Chris Jakubauskas, former professional baseball player
- Ian Johnson, retired professional football player (Miami Dolphins)
- Stephen G. Larson, attorney; former United States Federal judge
- Cory Lekkerkerker, retired professional football player
- Nick Lodolo, professional baseball player
- Joe Lunardi, ESPN NCAA Basketball Bracketologist
- Chad May, former NFL quarterback
- Mark McGwire, retired professional baseball player, MLB coach
- Mike Morrell, California state senator
- Daniel Moskos, professional baseball player
- Frank Pastore, retired professional baseball player
- Cody Ponce, professional baseball player
- William Saito, special advisor for the government of Japan in charge of science & technology; entrepreneur
- Dennis Shaw, retired professional football player; 1970 NFL Offensive Rookie of the Year
- Geoff Vanderstock, former world record holder 400 metres hurdles
- Tristan Vizcaino, professional football player
- Larry Wilmore, comedian, writer (The Daily Show)
