= Palomares League =

High school athletic league in California

Palomares League is a high school athletic league in Southern California. It is a member of the CIF Southern Section, serving the eastern San Gabriel Valley and Chino Hills in San Bernardino County. The 2014–15 school year will be its inaugural season. Several of these schools were previously in what was known as the Sierra League.

During the 2013 re-leaguing process, the new Palomares League was reorganized twice. The first vote on March 21 was annulled after an arbitration case brought by Damien High School and St. Lucy's Priory High School. Both private Catholic schools objected to being placed into Parochial Leagues. A new vote took place in May. The league is part of the Central Division, which also includes the Mt. Baldy League and Hacienda League.

== Members ==
Football members for the 2018 season.

- Diamond Bar High School (Diamond Bar, California)
- Ayala High School (Chino Hills, California)
- Bonita High School (La Verne, California)
- Claremont High School (Claremont, California)
- Walnut High School (Walnut, California)
- Glendora High School (Glendora, California)
