= Bonita Unified School District =

School district in California, United States

Location
- San Dimas, Los Angeles County, California; United States

District information
- Grades: K-12
- Schools: 14

Students and staff
- Students: 10,000

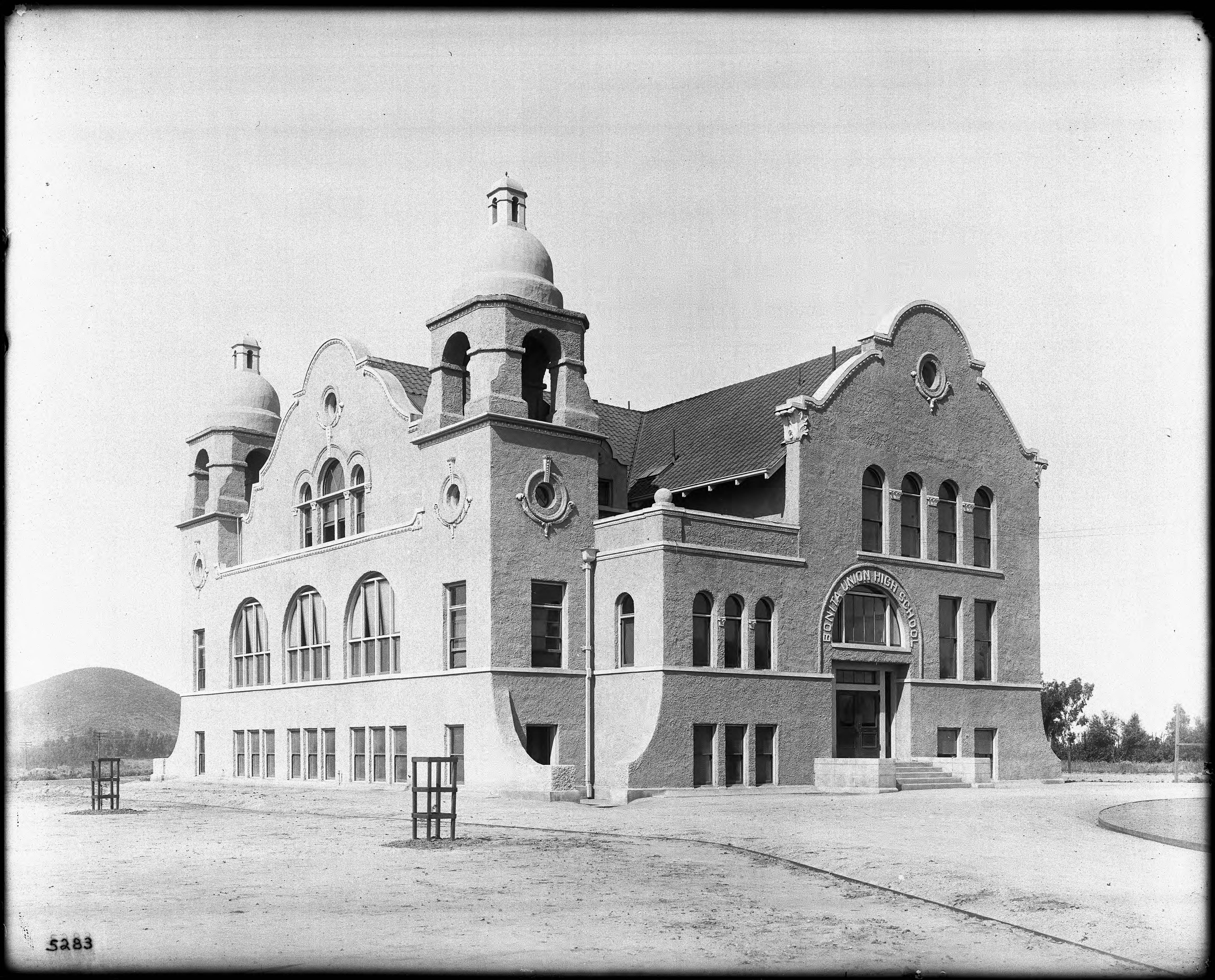
The Bonita Union High School serving two cities, San Dimas and Lordsburg (La Verne), ca.1900

Bonita Unified School District serves the communities of San Dimas and La Verne, and part of Glendora, in Los Angeles County.

The Bonita Unified School District has over 10,000 students in 14 schools. The district's headquarters are in San Dimas. The Board of Education members are elected at-large to a four-year term. The elections are held on a Tuesday after the first Monday in November of even-numbered years, starting with the 2018 election.

== Schools ==
=== Elementary schools (K-5) ===
- Allen Avenue Elementary School[San Dimas]
- Arma J. Shull Elementary School[San Dimas]
- Fred Ekstrand Elementary School[San Dimas]
- Gladstone Elementary School[San Dimas]
- Grace Miller Elementary School[La Verne]
- J. Marion Roynon Elementary School[La Verne]
- La Verne Heights Elementary School[La Verne]
- Oak Mesa Elementary School[La Verne]

=== Middle schools (6-8) ===
- Lone Hill Middle School[San Dimas]
- Ramona Middle School[La Verne]

=== High school (9-12) ===
- Bonita High School(La Verne)
- San Dimas High School(San Dimas)
- Chaparral High School (continuation high school)(San Dimas)

=== Alternative school (K-12) ===
- Vista School(San Dimas)
