= Glendora High School =

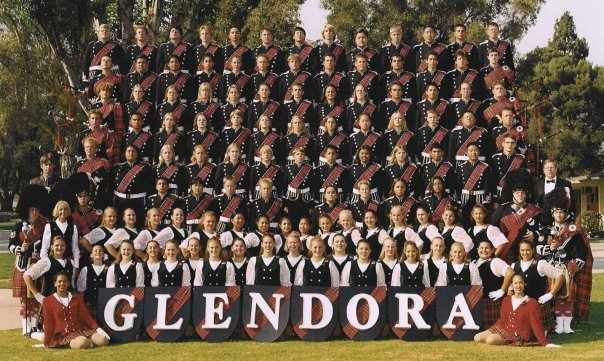

Location
- 1600 E Foothill Boulevard; Glendora, California 91741; United States; 34°08′03″N 117°50′08″W

Information
- Type: Comprehensive, public
- Established: 1958
- School district: Glendora Unified School District
- Superintendent: Dominic J. DiGrazia
- Principal: Rod Tilton
- Teaching staff: 87.14 (FTE)
- Grades: 9-12th
- Enrollment: 2,151 (2023-2024)
- Student to teacher ratio: 24.68
- Colours: Scarlet, black and white
- Athletics conference: Palomares League
- Nickname: Tartans
- Rivals: Charter Oak High School, Claremont High School
- Newspaper: The Tartan Shield
- Yearbook: Bellendaine
- Website: School Website
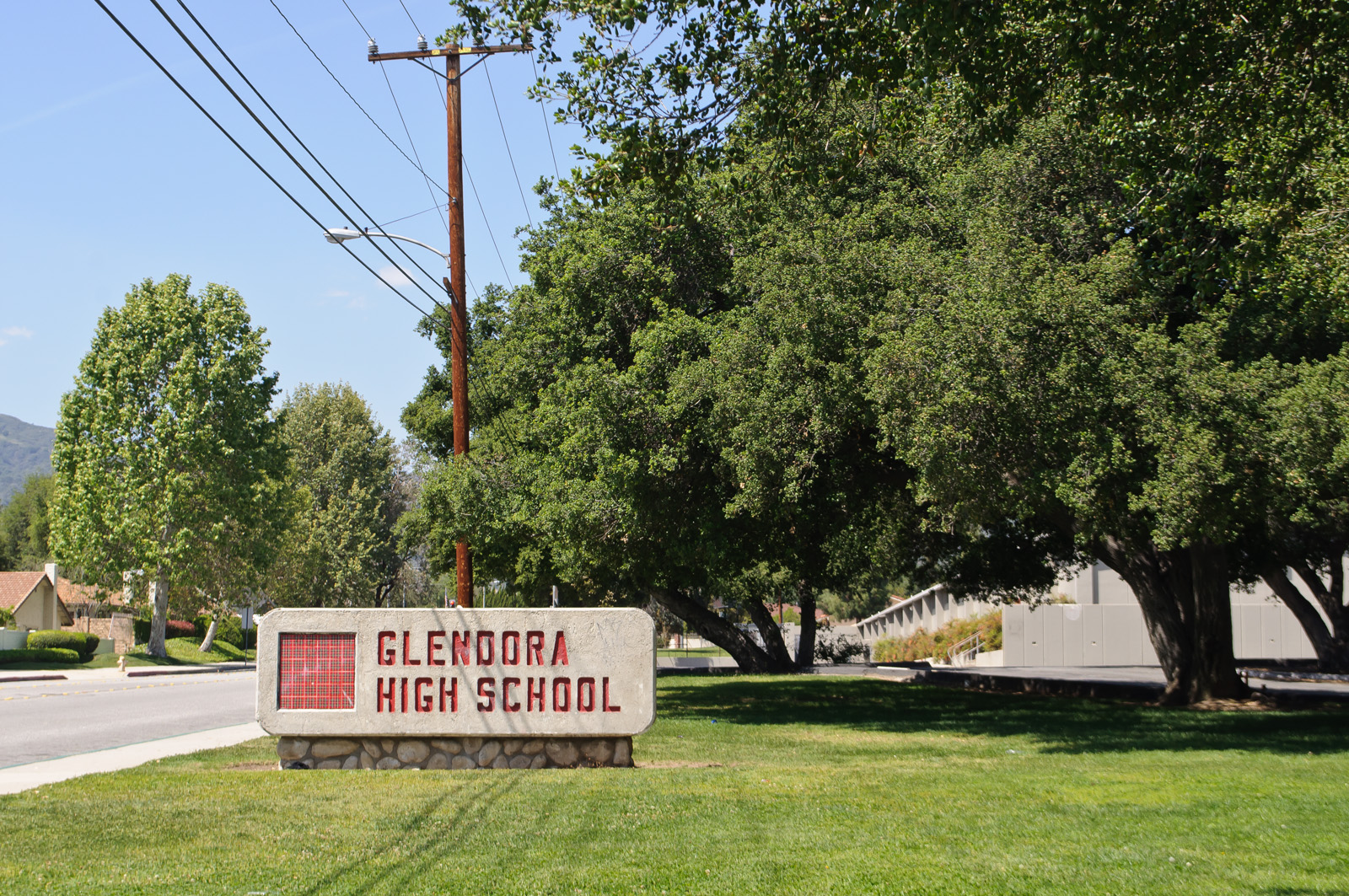

Glendora High School (GHS) is located in Glendora, Los Angeles County, California, United States.

== History ==
The high school was built in 1958 on land owned by Clarks Gordan, an orange grower. Before it was built, Glendora students attended Citrus Union which functioned as both a high school and junior college for the area. The land contained oak trees which still grow on the school grounds. The first graduating class of GHS was in 1959 and contained 188 students. The school's teams are known as the Glendora Tartans. This name was chosen by the first class in a vote between "Tartans" and "The Oranges".

== Activities ==
The school is notable for being one of six schools in California to have a bagpipe squad in its band program. The school's Tartan Band and Pageantry participated in the Tournament of Roses Parade in 2010 and 2014 and 2026, in Pasadena, California.

== Athletics ==
Glendora is a member of the Palomares League of the CIF Southern Section. The school's cross-country team achieved the CIF-SS Division II championship in 2009 and finished second at the CIF-State Division II Championships meet. The cross-country team was also in the CIF-State Division II Championship meet in 2011, placing 11th. The baseball program has achieved much success and captured a CIF-SS Division II championship in 2010. The girls' swim team has had success at the CIF level, winning the Division II Championship in 2011 and 2014, and placing second in 2010 and 2015. It has also entered CIF Masters in Cross Country 2016. The school's basketball team won the CIF-SS Division III championship in 2021.

== Awards ==
Glendora High School is a California Distinguished School, meaning it has a high API, which measures student academic performance.

== Notable alumni ==
- Lea Antonoplis, tennis player
- Tamra Barney, cast member, Real Housewives of Orange County
- Brian Cooper, professional baseball player (Anaheim Angels, Toronto Blue Jays, San Francisco Giants)
- Decker DeGraaf, college football tight end
- Collin Delia, professional ice hockey player (Chicago Blackhawks)
- Chuck Detwiler, American football player
- Casey Ellison, actor, Punky Brewster
- Jacob Gonzalez, professional baseball player (Chicago White Sox)
- Casey Jacobsen, former basketball player
- Chad Jeffries, professional football player
- Ed Kirkpatrick, professional baseball player (California Angels, Kansas City Royals, Pittsburgh Pirates, Texas Rangers, Milwaukee Brewers)
- Gabrial McNair, musician
- David Milhous (Brazzel), Emmy Award-winning film and television editor
- Mike Misuraca, professional baseball player (Milwaukee Brewers)
- Tracy Murray, former UCLA basketball player, former professional basketball player
- Anna Nalick, singer-songwriter
- Phil Ouellette, professional baseball player (San Francisco Giants)
- Ed Pierce, professional baseball player (Kansas City Royals)
- Adam Plutko, UCLA baseball player, CWS Most Outstanding Player
- Tony Robbins, motivational speaker
- Aaron Rowand, professional baseball player (Chicago White Sox, Philadelphia Phillies, San Francisco Giants)
- Jonathan Smith, head football coach at Michigan State University
- Gene Stone, professional baseball player (Philadelphia Phillies)
- Sharon Stouder, Olympic swimmer
- John Lambert, former USC swimmer, NCAA National Champion (1966 relay), Three time All-American
