= San Dimas High School =

Public school in San Dimas, California

Location
- 800 W. Covina Blvd; San Dimas, California; United States; 34.099°N 117.823°W

Information
- Type: Public
- Established: 1970
- School district: Bonita Unified School District
- Principal: Michael Kelly
- Enrollment: 1,248 (2023-2024)
- Colors: Blue and Gold
- Athletics conference: CIF Southern Section; Valle Vista League
- Mascot: Saint
- Yearbook: El Santo
- Website: www.sandimashigh.com

San Dimas High School is a secondary school located in San Dimas, California, in the United States. It is part of the Bonita Unified School District. Most of the students come from Lone Hill Middle School which shares the same city block as the High School. The school has a student body of 1,296 and an API score of 839. The mascot is the Saint and was originally depicted as a knight slaying a dragon. The school is also referred to by students as SD. Its colors are royal blue and bright gold.

== History ==
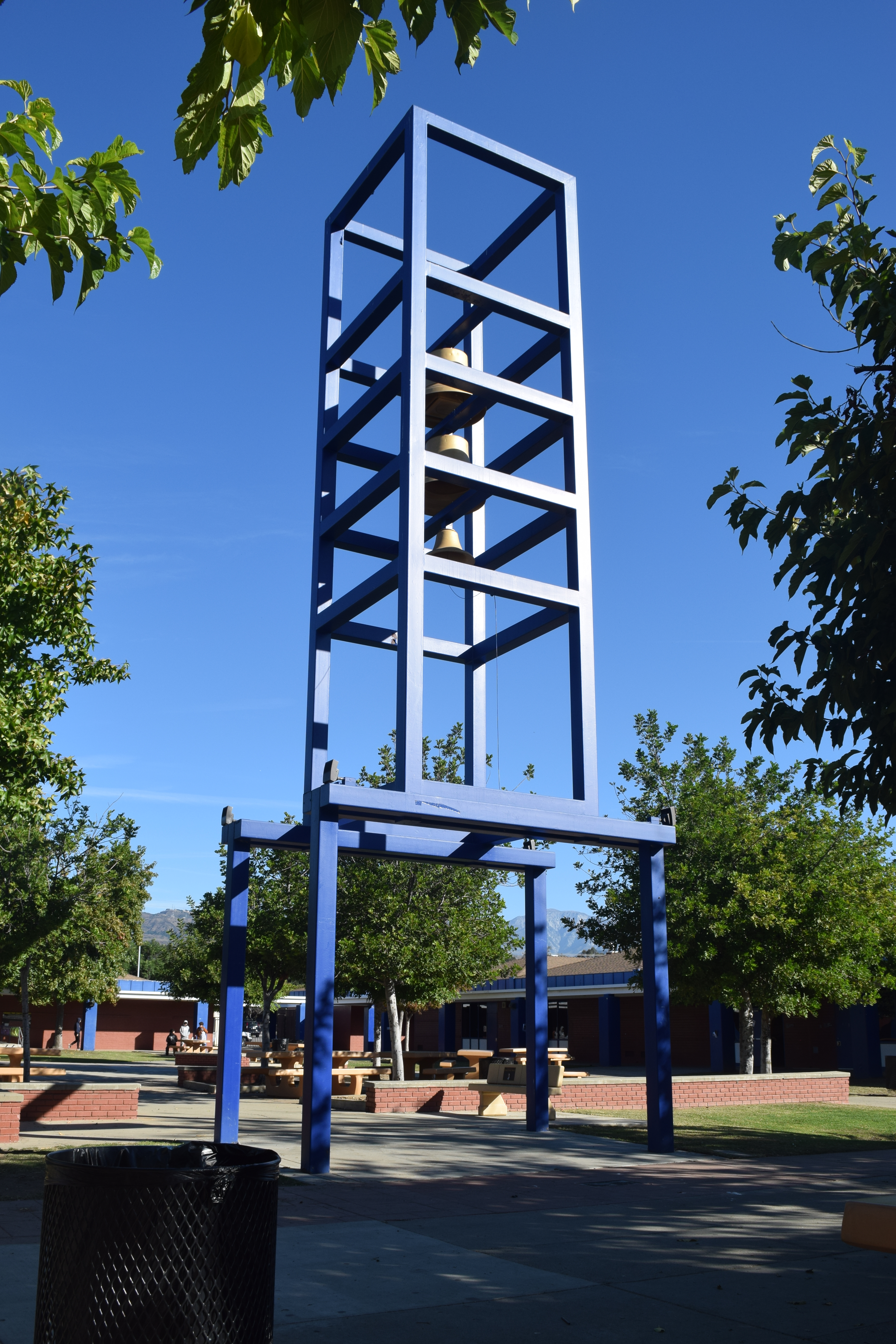
The San Dimas High School bell tower in 2023.

San Dimas High School was opened in 1970 to serve the growing population of San Dimas, California. A distinctive bell tower was built on campus in 1980 to create an icon for the main quad. The bell tower houses the bell from the original San Dimas Elementary School and is rung each time a team wins a CIF Championship. The bell tower was refurbished in 2011 with a wider base to support the structure. Each year the school plays their cross town rivals, Bonita High School, in the Smudge Pot Bowl football game. The winner of the game takes home a silver smudge pot reminiscent of the area's citrus growing history.

== Honors ==
San Dimas High School has been named a California Distinguished School three times, most recently in 2009. It has been on Newsweek Magazine's list of "America's Best High Schools," most recently in 2010. The Animation Program received a Golden Bell Award from the California School Boards Association in 2007.

== Advanced Placement courses ==
San Dimas High School offers 16 Advanced Placement (AP) Courses along with a variety of honors and accelerated courses:

- AP Biology
- AP Calculus AB
- AP Calculus BC
- AP Chemistry
- AP English Language
- AP English Literature
- AP Environmental Science
- AP French Language
- AP Music Theory
- AP Psychology
- AP Physics
- AP Spanish Language
- AP Statistics
- AP Studio Art
- AP United States Government
- AP United States History
- AP World History

== Athletics ==
San Dimas High School plays in the Valle Vista League. San Dimas Saint Football won the CIF Southern Section Division Mid-Valley (XI)(Section) Champion for 2009 by defeating Monrovia High School 12–7 at Citrus College on December 12, 2009. San Dimas Saint Baseball won the CIF Southern Section Division Champion for 2009 on June 5, 2009 at Angel Stadium.

== In popular culture ==
The title characters of the 1989 film Bill & Ted's Excellent Adventure attend San Dimas High School. A history project to be completed in front of the whole school drives the plot of the film. A line from another student's presentation, "San Dimas High School Football Rules!" has entered popular culture, such as the title of a song from the 1999 album Blue Skies, Broken Hearts...Next 12 Exits by The Ataris.

The player characters in the second season of Dungeons & Daddies are students at San Dimas High School.

== Notable alumni ==
- Bruce Thompson (1971), former California State Assembly member
- Bobby Rose (1985), former MLB infielder
- D. J. Hackett (1999), former NFL wide receiver
- Jamie Dantzscher (2000), artistic gymnast, Olympic bronze medalist
- Chris Pettit (2002), former MLB outfielder
- J. J. Spaun (2008), PGA Tour golfer
- Jimmy Lambert (2012), former MLB pitcher
- Peter Lambert (2015), former MLB pitcher
- Ally Lemos (2022), soccer player for the Orlando Pride
- Decker DeGraaf (2024 - transferred), tight end for the Washington Huskies
