= St. Lucy's Priory High School =

Private school in Glendora, California, US

Location
- 655 West Sierra Madre Avenue; Glendora, (Los Angeles County), California 91741; United States; 34°8′53″N 117°52′37″W

Information
- Type: Private
- Motto: Lux, Veritas, Pax (Light, Truth, Peace)
- Religious affiliation: Roman Catholic
- Patron saint: Saint Lucy
- Established: 1962
- Oversight: Benedictine Sisters
- Principal: Mandi Ramirez
- Prioress: Sr. Elizabeth Brown
- Faculty: 36
- Grades: 9–12
- Gender: Girls
- Enrollment: 253 students
- Student to teacher ratio: 14:1
- Colors: Royal blue and light blue
- Mascot: Roarie, the regent or one who rules
- Team name: Regents
- Accreditation: Western Association of Schools and Colleges
- Publication: Impressions (literary magazine)
- Newspaper: The Laureate
- Yearbook: Lumen
- School fees: $1300 Registration Fee, $250 Graduation Fee, $75 Incoming Freshman Application/Testing Fee
- Tuition: $12,750
- Website: www.stlucys.com

St. Lucy's Priory High School is a private, Roman Catholic, all-girls high school in Glendora, California, founded in 1962. It is located in the Roman Catholic Archdiocese of Los Angeles and overseen by the Benedictine Sisters of St. Lucy's Priory.

== Admission and enrollment ==
Admission is based on STS High School Placement Test scores, grades, recommendations, and personal interviews.

The 2022–2023 enrollment was 253 students with a senior class of 73. The school population is 78% Catholic; student ethnic distribution is 42% Hispanic/Latino, 26% White/Other, 20% Multiracial, 6% Asian, 4% Filipino, and 2% African American. The student-teacher ratio is 14–1.

== Accreditation ==
St. Lucy's Priory High School is accredited by the Western Association of Schools and Colleges, a regional accrediting association recognized by the California Office of Education and the National Commission of Accrediting. St. Lucy's was first accredited in 1967 and has been accredited through 2023. St. Lucy's Priory High School is also accredited by the Western Catholic Educational Association and by the Board of Admissions and Relations with Schools of the University of California.

== Academics ==
St. Lucy's Priory High School provides a college-preparatory academic program. The school mandates seven classes, and offers honors and AP classes. There are elective classes in creative and performative arts, computer science, and cultural and human studies.

== Extracurricular ==
As a member of the California Interscholastic Federation (CIF) and the Baseline League, St. Lucy's fields varsity teams in tennis, cross-country, volleyball, golf, soccer, basketball, water polo, softball, equestrian team, track and swimming. Other extracurricular activities include A.S.B., National Honor Society, California Scholarship Federation, KIWINS, Junior Statesmen of America, Drama Club, Social Issues Club, Thirst Project, Recycling Club, Spring Musical, Science Olympiad Team, Science Club, Language Club, Music for the Masses, and Regiment and Band for Damien High School.

== Controversy ==
In July 2013, it was revealed that St. Lucy's had terminated the employment of a teacher who had married a partner of the same sex, following changes to California's marriage law. Ken Bencomo had taught at the school for 17 years, but had his contract terminated by Assistant Principal Sister Helen Dziuk after a photograph of the marriage appeared in a local newspaper. He was told that making his marriage public violated his contract.

Bencomo said that his sexual orientation had been known by St. Lucy's. According to a statement released by the school, St. Lucy's "does not discriminate against teachers or other school employees based on their private lifestyle choices, [but] public displays of behavior that are directly contrary to church teachings are inconsistent with these values." The statement added, "These values are incorporated into the contractual obligations of each of our instructors and other employees."

A public petition was launched by alumnae and the St. Lucy's community calling for Bencomo's reinstatement, which proved unsuccessful. He was subsequently employed at a charter school in Pomona, California.

== Uniforms ==
At St. Lucys all girls are to wear a uniform that follows the schools handbook. The uniforms are to be purchased at Dennis Uniform. The proper colors are white, baby blue, and navy blue polo shirts and a navy blue or blue plaid skirt along with the options of navy blue pants or shorts. For the skirts and shorts they may not be shorter than 3 inches above the knee. When picking out shoes they need to be solid, neutral color and socks should be above the ankle and plain solid color with no logos.

== Notable alumnae ==
- Effie T. Brown '89, motion picture and television producer
- Martika, singer/actress
- Stacey Nuveman-Deniz '96, softball player
