= Juan Flores (outlaw) =

Mexican-American outlaw (1834–1857)

- Born: 1834; Mexico
- Died: February 14, 1857 (aged 22–23); Los Angeles, California Territory
- Cause of death: Execution by hanging
- Known for: 19th century Californio bandit

Juan Flores (c. 1834 – February 14, 1857) was a 19th-century Californio bandit who, with Pancho Daniel, led an outlaw gang known as "las Manillas" (the Handcuffs) and later as the Flores Daniel Gang, throughout Southern California during 1856-1857. Although regarded by historians as a thief and outlaw, Flores was considered among Mexican-Americans as a folk hero akin to Jesse James and who was thought of as a defender against vigilante movements in the years following the American settlement of California and its incorporation into the United States. However, the activities of Flores and other insurrectos such as Salomon Pico and Joaquín Murrieta against American and foreign-born settlers not only created long-lasting suspicion and hostility towards Mexican-Americans but also divided the traditional Spanish class structures of the Californios and the poorer peasants as well.

== Early life ==
Born to a prominent family, according to Horace Bell, "Juan Flores was a dark complexioned fellow of medium height slim, lithe and graceful, a most beautiful figure in the fandango or on horseback, and about twenty-two years old. There was nothing peculiar about Juan except his tiger-like walk—always seeming to be in the very act of springing upon his prey. His eyes, neither black, grey, nor blue, greatly resembling those of the owl—always moving, watchful and wary, and the most cruel and vindictive-looking eyes that were ever set in human head." Of course, Bell's depiction of Flores reflects the widespread racism of the times, especially in Bell's use of dehumanized animal terms.

Flores was first arrested in 1855 for horse stealing and imprisoned in San Quentin. However, he soon escaped in October 1856 as part of a breakout led by himself and Jim "Red Horse" Webster that seized a brig tied up at the prison wharf that the convicts sailed across the bay and escaped into Contra Costa County (although other sources claim he served his prison term). Flores joined forces with Pancho Daniel and a dozen or so ranch hands, miners and other Angelinos such as Anastasio García, Jesus Espinosa, Andrés Fontes, Chino Varelas, Faustino García, Juan Cartabo and "One-eyed" Piguinino among others. During the next two years, Daniel, Flores and their "los Manilas" gained a following among the Mexican-American population in the San Luis Obispo- and San Juan Capistrano-areas with his numbers growing to over fifty men. One of the largest gangs in the state, "los Manilas" terrorized the area for the next two years primarily stealing horses and cattle but also committing armed robbery, murder and conducting raids against towns and homesteads in the area. Due in part to attention by newspapers, opposition to what became known as the "Flores Revolution" began to take form by public officials and law enforcement as well as upper-class Californios such as Andrés Pico, José Antonio Andres Sepúlveda and Tomas Avila Sanchez all of whom later participated in the capture of Flores.

== Raid on San Juan Capistrano ==
In late-December 1856 or early-January 1857, Flores attempted to pursue and rob a wagon traveling from Los Angeles to San Juan Capistrano. Missing the wagon somewhere on the road, Flores instead led a group of outlaws on a raid against San Juan Capistrano looting the shop of a local Russian-Polish merchant Michael Krazewski. Wounding a store assistant, they carried nearly all the goods in the store on two horses promising to return to the town. The next day, Flores made another raid on the town in which German shopkeeper George Pflugardt was murdered and several stores were looted. They had been after an informant who had previously testified against him for horse stealing years earlier and, when the man was able to escape before their arrival, they proceeded to loot the town and spent the night "in drunken revelry" until leaving sometime around 2:00 am. When authorities in Los Angeles were alerted of the incident, they dispatched Sheriff James R. Barton and a posse of six well-armed men and set out to apprehend Flores.

== Death of Sheriff Barton ==
After leaving San Juan Capistrano, Flores was visiting a female companion "Chola" Martina Burruel in the Burruel Adobe outside the town. During his stay, Sheriff Barton was killed along with his constables William H. Little and Charles R. Baker while traveling down the road to San Juan Capistrano. Only 12 miles south of San Joaquín Ranch, Barton and his posse were on their way to apprehend Flores for George Pflugardt's murder when they were ambushed at Barranco de los Alisos and killed by Flores and members of his gang. The surviving members of Barton's posse who managed to escape the ambush and pursuit by the gang, fled back to Los Angeles.

== Capture and death ==
Barton's death caused a backlash against outlaw violence in the region as members of Flores' gang were hunted down and captured by authorities with a Los Angeles posse that included 51 American merchants and Californio ranchers, Manuel Cota the Temecula leader of 43 Luiseño scouts, the Monte Rangers former Texas Rangers and members of the vigilante gang the "El Monte Boys", and posses from San Bernardino and San Diego. A large group of the gang were discovered by the Luiseño scouts in their hideout in the Sierra de Santiago. A posse led by the Californios Andrés Pico and Tomas Avila Sanchez, surrounded and apprehended them, however Pancho Daniel and Flores himself managed to escape northward through the mountains. The Monte Rangers moving to cut off escapees, captured Flores and Pancho Daniel after a shootout, but they managed to free themselves and escape that night.

Numbers ranging from fifty to seventy Mexican-Americans were arrested on having connections with Flores and between February 1857 and November 1858, eleven others suspected of being members of the Flores gang were lynched, most by the "El Monte Boys". According to historian John Boessenecker, only four of these men were confirmed as members of the gang.

After eleven days on the run, Flores was brought in by a 120-man posse led by Andrés Pico. With "practically every man, woman and child present in the pueblo" numbering an estimated 3,000 people, Flores was tried for murder and hanged near the top of Fort Hill in what would later be present-day downtown Los Angeles on February 14, 1857; Addressing the crowd from the scaffold, he stated "he bore no malice, was dying justly, and that he hoped that those he had wronged would forgive him". When his execution was carried out, his noose being too short, Flores instead died from suffocation instead of having his neck broken as intended.

== Legacy ==
Pancho Daniel would later be hanged on November 30, 1858. The last surviving member of the Juan Flores gang, Andrés Fontes, was believed to have instigated the events leading to the shooting death of Barton and his party due to a personal disagreement with Sheriff Barton. Fontes was reportedly killed in Baja California by its military frontier governor Feliciano Ruiz de Esparza along with Salomon Pico and 13 other California bandits.

== Flores Peak ==
Flores Peak, part of Santiago Canyon located in Orange County, was named after the outlaw leader to commemorate the capture of much of the Flores gang although Flores himself escaped. It is rumored that after fleeing up Modjeska Canyon, Juan Flores attempted to head up and over Saddleback Mountain. He started his up the hills a location near the current Modjeska Fire Station (OCFA Station 16) and ended up being cornered on a nearby peak overlooking Harding Canyon. He then, as legend has it, rode his horse down the face of the peak, which can be seen from Modjeska Canyon Road, and made his escape.
