= Martin V. Biscailuz =

American politician and attorney (1861–1899)

Member of the Los Angeles Common Council
- In office 1884–1885

Personal details
- Born: 1861 France
- Died: 1899 (aged 37–38)
- Spouse: Ida Rose Warren (divorced)
- Relations: Bernardo Donalecke (stepfather)
- Children: Eugene W. Biscailuz
- Occupation: Attorney, Politician
- Known for: Lawyer, Politician, Father of LA County Sheriff Eugene W. Biscailuz

Martin V. Biscailuz (1861 – 1899) was an American attorney in Los Angeles, California, and a member of the Los Angeles Common Council. As a result of alcoholism, he later lost his fortune, spent time in jail, and died penniless. He was the father of Eugene W. Biscailuz, sheriff of Los Angeles County from 1932 to 1958.

== Family ==
Biscailuz was born in 1861 in France to parents of Basque extraction. His stepfather, Bernardo Donalecke, was a sheep raiser living in San Fernando, California, in 1880. Martin had a younger brother by three years, William, and two younger stepsiblings, Domigo and Mary.

Martin Biscailuz was married to Ida Rose Warren, and while living in the Boyle Heights district in 1883 they had a son, Eugene, who became Los Angeles County sheriff from 1932 to 1958. Martin and his wife later divorced.

== Organizations ==
Biscailuz was a charter member in November 1883 of the newly formed California Legion No. 1 chapter of the Ancient Order of United Workmen, and May 1884 he was secretary of Signet Chapter No. 57, Royal Arch Masons.

== Career ==
=== Beginnings ===
In November 1882, at the age of about 21, Biscailuz was admitted by Judge Ygnacio Sepulveda to practice in his division of the Superior Court after having "proved satisfactory testimonials of good moral character, and having undergone a strict examination," and two years later he was nominated in a Democratic Party convention to run in the 2nd Ward for the Los Angeles Common Council. He was elected and served a one-year term.

While on the council, he was in opposition to Police Chief Edward McCarthy, and when Mayor Edward F. Spence submitted a report excoriating the chief, Biscailuz offered a motion declaring McCarthy's office vacant. The motion was ruled out of order at the time, but by the next week McCarthy was out of office and John Horner was appointed in his place.

=== Rise ===
Biscailuz went to a "law college in the East," but failed his examination to become a member of the Los Angeles County Bar Association and thereupon moved to Kansas, where he succeeded in becoming a member of the bar of the Supreme Court of that state through an act of the Kansas Legislature. He then went to Washington, D.C., where he was admitted to the bar of the Supreme Court of the United States. He returned to California and "on the strength of his eastern credentials" was admitted to the California bar by the California State Supreme Court.

He became a notable attorney and numbered wealthy Basque residents among his clients. The Los Angeles Times recalled that Biscailuz "had a law practice that was the envy of every lawyer in Southern California." He was "Rich, brilliant and skillful in his chosen work," with "more cases than he could attend to." About 1890, he received the largest legal fee ever paid in Los Angeles County up to that time, variously reported as $36,000 or $40,000, in connection with the "Oxarat estate" case.

It was reported that "the Los Angeles bar contained no gayer member" than he, that "His silk hat was the glossiest tile in town, his linen was immaculate, and his carriage and pair were the envy, even of members of the local 400." He was said to be "the most familiar character known to Los Angeles."

In June 1890 Biscailuz was sued by Jean Leonis in what would become one of many pieces of litigation among various parties over the disposition of the extensive and valuable estate of landowner Miguel Leonis. Jean, who neither spoke nor read English, claimed that he had proposed to pay Biscailuz one thousand dollars to look after Jean's interest in obtaining his proper share of Miguel's estate but that a document drawn up in the English language, which Jean signed, instead stipulated that Biscailuz would be given one-half of anything Jean expected to receive, about $100,000 in all. The trial judge decided in favor of Biscailuz, stating that the agreement was valid and even if the fee were deemed excessive it had been agreed to by both parties.

=== Decline ===
The Times reported shortly before Biscailuz's death that:

As administrator of an estate of one of his former clients[,] he became possessed of a fortune of $15,000 or $20,000 about twelve years ago, but he could not stand prosperity. He lived high while the money lasted, and started on a career of dissipation, from which he never recovered. Friends and family forsook him on account of his intemperate habits, and when his money was gone he resorted to pilfering and committing forgery for small sums, in order to eke out a miserable existence. He frequently got into jail on account of these petty crimes.

By 1895, he had been committed at least once to the Southern California State Asylum for the Insane and Inebriates, and in May of that year he was on trial in the forgery of a document in the name of Judge Walter Van Dyke. He was acquitted of that charge "on the grounds that he was of unsound mind," but the next day he was placed on trial in an attempt to send him back to the asylum. His defense witnesses in the first trial were subpoenaed for the prosecution in the second. His doctor testified that Biscailuz was sane enough until he drank alcohol, particularly when it was laced with absinthe. Biscailuz was acquitted, with Judge Smith remarking that "it was a free country, and if any man chose to drink himself into temporary insanity, he could hardly be prevented by the courts from doing so at will."

He was arrested again in November 1895 on charges of obtaining money on false pretenses, but they were dismissed for lack of evidence. Another arrest came in August 1897 after he was spotted making off with several lawbooks from the office of Major Horace Bell, which he sold before he could be apprehended. He was sent to jail for the last time in October 1898 for "obtaining money from laboring men by fraudulently representing himself as an officer of the city street department, and as such, able to procure work for them for a financial consideration." Despite his plea for mercy because he suffered from Bright's disease and rheumatism, Justice Owens sentenced him to 180 days.

== Death ==
Biscailuz was released from jail on April 13, 1898, and was sent immediately to the Los Angeles County Hospital, "a mental and physical wreck." He died there on June 22, 1899, and was buried in the Cathedral Catholic cemetery under the direction of his brother and his son.
