= History of the Los Angeles County Sheriff's Department =

The History of the Los Angeles County Sheriff's Department began with its founding in 1850 as the first professional police force in the Los Angeles area.

== Early history ==
Following the organization of the State of California into counties, the Sheriff's Department of Los Angeles County was formed in April, 1850. Elections for the office of sheriff were held annually until 1882, when the term was increased to two years; in 1894 the term was increased to four years. The first sheriff of Los Angeles County was George T. Burrill and his staff consisted of two Deputies.

=== The Los Angeles Rangers (1852-1856) ===
The local newspaper, Los Angeles Star, reported that in 1852, the Los Angeles Rangers were organized (since they assisted both the L.A. County Sheriff and the L.A. Town Marshal, they were the predecessors of both the L.A. County Sheriffs Department and of the Los Angeles Police Department). The Rangers were actually a California State Militia Company that acted as a posse, taking orders through their captain from the office of the sheriff. Combining both Mexican and American influences, mounted and uniformed, the Rangers formed a troop of 100 men. Their duties included the pursuit of criminals or Indian raiders.

The Southern California, another local newspaper of the time, remarked, "We are proud to think that the Los Angeles Rangers have the full confidence of our whole community." The Los Angeles Star praised the Rangers as a step toward improving matters in the area. One of the Rangers, Major Horace Bell, later wrote, Reminiscences of a Ranger; or, Early times in Southern California, describing this organization and activities.

=== Flores Daniel Gang and Getman murder ===
In 1857, the outstanding crime was the murder of James Barton, Sheriff of Los Angeles County, and several members of this posse by members of the Flores Daniel Gang. Barton was killed only three weeks after he was elected to his second term.

On a tip, Sheriff Barton and his posse set out to capture a group of bandits. They traveled south toward San Juan Capistrano. On the morning of January 23, 1857, Barton and his posse encountered the bandits. In the ensuing struggle, the Sheriff and all but two of his men were shot. Three of the bandits were killed. Immediately after the funerals another posse gave pursuit to the villains. In all, fifty-two bandits were captured, eleven were hanged. They were hanged at Fort Hill - a rise of ground behind the jail - where a temporary gallows had been constructed." Fort Hill was located north of Los Angeles and Aliso Streets.

Ironically, shortly after being elected to replace Sheriff Barton, on January 7, 1858, Sheriff William C. Getman (once Lieutenant of the Rangers), was killed, after serving only seven days in office, while attempting to arrest a "maniac." The incident was reported as follows:

The maniac was hiding at the Monte Pico, a pawn shop near Los Angeles and Aliso Streets. There the Sheriff found the suspect locked and barricaded in a room. While the Sheriff was endeavoring to force an entrance, the suspect threw open the door, ran out and, to the dismay of all, pulled a pistol from his pocket, discharged the weapon, and Sheriff Getman dropped on the spot. The suspect then retreated into the pawn shop and fired at the crowd which had gathered. A Deputy finally killed the desperado, but not before the desperado fired twenty or thirty shots, four or five of which passed through the Deputy's clothing.

=== Chinese massacre of 1871 ===
On Monday, October 25, 1871, a tong war among local Chinese resulted in the death of Robert Thompson, a white rancher. This would precipitate the Chinese massacre of 1871. A riot broke out immediately after Thompson's murder and a massacre of Chinese residents began. At least 17 to 20 Chinese were killed by the mob.

Sheriff James Frank Burns addressed the crowd and persuaded everyone to peacefully disperse. Burns then formed a posse of 25 Deputies to maintain order in the community. The story of the massacre was heard around the world and the U.S. government made an official apology to China. Burns obtained 150 arrest warrants against known mob members and one by one arrested them.

== Modern history ==
Twenty-four men have served Los Angeles County as Sheriff since 1850: nineteen were elected and six were appointed by the Board of Supervisors to serve the unexpired term of their predecessors. Two were killed in the line of duty. Of those appointed, four were re-elected to the office.

=== 1870s to 1910s ===
In 1871, William B. Rowland was sworn as sheriff in 1871 and was re-elected three times.

In 1899, the first African American Deputy Sheriff, J.B. Loving, was hired by Sheriff William A. Hammel.

In 1907, the department purchased its first automobile for use by the sheriff. In 1912, Mrs. Margaret Q. Adams was sworn in as the first woman Deputy in the United States.

=== 1920s to 1930s ===
The first sub-stations were completed in 1924. They were the Florence (became Firestone Park Station in 1955) and East Los Angeles Stations. Two years later, the Vermont (became Lennox Station in 1948), Norwalk, Temple City and Newhall Stations were also completed, with the Altadena, Fairfax and San Dimas Stations completed within the next few years.

In 1932, Sheriff Eugene Biscailuz was appointed Sheriff; he would hold that position until retiring in 1958.

The marked patrol car system was inaugurated and uniforms were adopted in 1932. Prior to this time, all Departmental personnel wore civilian clothes. The Sheriff's School of Instruction, now known as the Sheriff's Academy, was opened in 1935.

=== 1940s to 1970s ===
1963 - After 179 years of private police patrol, Catalina Island contracted with Los Angeles county. the Men's Central Jail was completed and the Sybil Brand Institute for Women was completed.

1964 - The City of Industry Station was completed. The "Sky Knight" helicopter patrol was initiated in 1966.

1968 - Establishment of the Special Enforcement Detail, one of the first SWAT team units in the United States, after the Los Angeles Police Department had founded their own SWAT team in 1967.

1969 - On August 16, in the largest documented police raid in the history of California, more than one hundred officers from the Special Enforcement Detail are deployed at Spahn Ranch, leading to the arrest of Manson Family members due to suspicion of their participation in an automobile theft ring (unrelated to their later arrest in the Tate-LaBianca murders).

1970 -The Special Enforcement and Emergency Services Bureau facilities were completed.

1972 - The Automated Index System was initiated with instant access to criminal records and fingerprints from other justice agencies and summary probation sentences from county courts. Santa Clarita Valley Station was dedicated, replacing the old Newhall Station.

1973 - The Communications Center began operations with computerized high speed dispatch facilities.

=== 1980s to 1990s ===
1981 -The first full-time female law enforcement helicopter pilot in the nation's history started flying.

Sherman Block entered the department as a deputy sheriff in 1956 and continued up through the ranks until he was appointed by the board of supervisors to succeed Sheriff Peter Pitchess in 1982. In June 1982, Block was elected to a full four-year term.

1988 - The Beretta 9 mm semi-automatic pistol became the department's official sidearm. The Gang Enforcement Team (G.E.T.) was created.

1989 - The department began transmitting radio calls on new portable 480 Radio Systems. The Sheriff's Museum was dedicated.

1990 - The Transit Service Bureau was formed. The North County Correctional Center dedicated by President George H. W. Bush and Sheriff Block.

1991 - The Office of Professional and Ethical Standards was created. The Mobile Digital Communication System was dedicated. The Lost Hills Station was dedicated.

1992 - The Metro Vice Bureau. the Palmdale Station and the Risk Management Bureau were created.

1993 - Universal City Substation opened (formerly located in a trailer). The Professional Standards & Training Division was created. The Biscailuz Center closed. the Hall of Justice Jail closed. Headquarters moved to Monterey Park. the Mira Loma Jail Facility closed.

1994 - The Marshal's Department merged with the Sheriff's Department. Deputy Marshals are sworn in as Deputy Sheriffs, and the Marshal's Security Officers become the genesis of the Sheriff's Security Officer program. Lynwood Regional Justice Center dedicated.

1996 - Lancaster Sheriff's Station dedicated. First Regional Civilian Academy graduation ceremony.

1997 - Consolidation of Custody Divisions North and South into a single Custody Division. Twin Towers Correctional Facility Grand Opening. Restoration of Pico Rivera Station to full service. Mira Loma Detention Center re-opened to house Immigration and Naturalization Service (INS) detainees.

As of December 31, 1995, a total of 2,557,754 citizens in an area of 3,171 square miles (8,210 km^{2}) received direct law enforcement from the Los Angeles County Sheriff's Department.

With 8,028 sworn personnel and 4,377 civilian employees (as of December 1, 1996), the Los Angeles County Sheriff's Department is the largest Sheriff's Department in the world.

1998 - On December 7 Leroy D. Baca was sworn in as Los Angeles County's 30th Sheriff.

1999 - Creation of the Deputy Leadership Institute, Asian Crime Task Force, and Community Oriented Policing Services (COPS) Bureau. Expanded the Vital Intervention and Directional Alternatives (VIDA) program, the Town Sheriff program, and other mentoring programs. Opened the Biscailuz Recovery Center and restored the San Dimas and Marina Del Rey Stations to full-service status. Formed the LASD Charitable Committee, a year-long program to fund the first-ever float in the Tournament of Roses Parade and to raise funds for the department's youth programs. Scientific Services Bureau is now conducting advanced DNA testing procedure utilizing STR (short tandem repeats) technology. STR technology enables personnel to conduct "cold searches" from biological evidence collected at crime scenes to identify possible suspects.

=== 2000s to present ===
2000 - After 44 years of being one of six contract cities being serviced from Lakewood Station, the City of Cerritos became under autonomous command and began law enforcement services from their new Cerritos Station. On September 17, Compton began contracting services with the Sheriff's Department. The Community Transition Unit was established to help former inmates reintegrate into the community.

2001 - A new Mobile Recruitment Center was put into service, allowing personnel to administer entrance examinations for prospective deputy sheriffs at community events, college campuses, and job fairs. Formalization of the Department's 30-year strategic plan, known as LASD2. Establishment of the Office of Independent Review, which oversees internal investigations and citizen complaints. The security and law enforcement services for nine campuses of the Los Angeles Community College District became part of the Sheriff's Department and became the Community College Bureau. Creation of the Hate Crimes Unit and In-Court Release Program.

2002 - Formation of the Office of Homeland Security, this division is responsible for the coordinated strategy of preparedness for Los Angeles County's first responders. The Sheriff's Communications Center was remodeled. Los Angeles Sheriff's Department University (LASDU) was created making educational opportunities available for Department personnel.

2003 - The contract for the Metropolitan Transportation Authority (MTA) was expanded to include the entire transit system, making the Los Angeles County Sheriff's Department the second largest transit policing agency in the nation. Aero Bureau received shipment on seven new American Eurocopter A-STAR helicopters to upgrade the Bureau's aging fleet. Cargo Criminal Apprehension Team (Cargo CATs) was resurrected by funding provided by the Port of Los Angeles and the Los Angeles County Board of Supervisors. A new Emergency Services Detail rescue boat was provided by special grant funding from the California Division of Boating and Waterways, and motors donated by Honda. Five new search and rescue equipment trucks were obtained with drug asset forfeiture funds. A new bomb detection canine "Simba" was given to the department by the foundation to Combat Terrorism and Transnational Crime.

2004 - The Rowland Heights Service Center was opened to better serve the community. A new neighborhood Sheriff's Office was opened for business in the Athens area of unincorporated Los Angeles. Compton Sheriff's Station received a free refurbishment from the television show "Monster House."

2005 - Construction began on the new state-of-the art Los Angeles Regional Crime Laboratory which will be located on the California State University, Los Angeles campus.

2006 - In July, The Joint Regional Intelligence Center (JRIC) opened its doors to coordinate the tracking and dissemination of counter-Terrorism information. the Terrorism Early Warning (TEW) group, in a concerted effort with the Federal Bureau of Investigation and the Los Angeles Police Department, will filter tips received regarding possible terrorist activities.

2009 - On December 15, 2009, the LA County Board of Supervisors voted 4–1 to eliminate Los Angeles County Office of Public Safety (OPS) and turn its responsibilities over to the LASD, all OPS employees were either hired by the LASD or placed on paid administrative leave by June 30, 2010, which was the target date set by the Board of Supervisors for its Human Resources to have placed the adversely affected employees in alternate jobs. Because few displaced OPS employees had actually been offered alternate employment by the target date, the board of supervisors extended the sunset period to September 30, 2010. Those deemed unqualified for alternate employment by that date were laid off. The OPS former responsibilities are now handled by the newly formed LASD County Services Bureau and Parks Bureau. The Sheriff's Department took over OPS responsibilities. The merger was completed in 2010. Sworn County Police Officer positions are largely replaced with more cost effective Sheriff's Security Officers, supplemented by Deputy Sheriffs.

On November 12, 2023, three current deputies and one retired deputy were found to have died by suicide within less than 24 hours of one another. The LA County Sheriff’s department said homicide detectives were investigating each of the four deaths independently, while the names of the deceased were not disclosed. It is believed there is no correlation between the deaths. Overall nine members of the department have died by suicide in 2023, a number far surpassing recent years: one in 2022, three in 2021 and two in 2020.

Three deputies were killed July 18, 2025, in an explosion, at the Biscailuz Training Facility in East Los Angeles. The blast occurred while the arson explosives detail unit was moving ordnance in the parking lot about 7:30 a.m.
