= John A. Rowland =

Nineteenth-century ranchero in Southern California

John Albert Rowland
- Born: c. 1791; Cecil County, Maryland
- Died: October 13, 1873 (aged 82); Rancho La Puente
- Resting place: El Campo Santo Cemetery, City of Industry, California
- Employer(s): fur trader, merchant, rancher
- Known for: early San Gabriel Valley settler and major landowner
- Spouse(s): María Encarnación Martínez, Charlotte M. Gray

John A. Rowland, commonly known in Spanish as Don Juan Rowland, was an American-Mexican settler and ranchero in the San Gabriel Valley of California before it became part of the United States. Born in Maryland, Rowland moved west with his family to Ohio. As a young man, he immigrated to the Mexican territory of Santa Fe de Nuevo México. There he became a naturalized Mexican citizen and married María Encarnación Martínez, his first wife. (She lived to 1851, after which he married again.)

They moved with their children in the 1840s to Alta California, where he became a prominent landowner and businessmen. Many of their ten children married into other Californio families. One son discovered oil on his land and became president of an oil company in 1885. Rowland Heights, California is named for John A. Rowland, as are some area schools. The John A. Rowland House, the oldest brick house in Southern California, has been preserved in the City of Industry.

== Early life ==
Sources differ as to several aspects of the early life of John Albert Rowland (April 15, 1791–October 13, 1873). His birthplace is believed to have been either in Cecil County, Maryland or Pennsylvania, depending upon which reference is accepted. Some historians have questioned whether "Albert" was his middle name, as he never used it on official or legal documents. His birthdate is uncertain, as his tombstone indicated his age at death (82 years), which was not an unusual practice, rather than specific birth and death dates. Most census records from 1850 and later in California indicate a later than 1790 birth and differing birthplace: southeastern Pennsylvania (Census 1850/1851: 52 years old), across the river from Cecil County, Maryland (Censuses 1860: 62 years old and 1870: 68 years old).

At an early date in the 19th century, the Rowland family migrated to Morgan County, Ohio, located roughly between present-day Wheeling, West Virginia and Columbus, Ohio. They traveled westward along a route used by many migrants from the Eastern states in the first decade or two of the century. As a young man, Rowland presumably followed the Ohio River to the Mississippi, and then north to St. Louis. From there, he would have traveled along the Missouri River to the town of Franklin at the western edge of the United States. In 1823, using the new Santa Fe Trail, he migrated to the Mexican territory of Nuevo Mexico, (now the U.S. state of New Mexico). Mexico had gained independence from Spain in 1821.

Rowland was said to have been trained as a surveyor, but when he moved to San Fernando de Taos, he worked as a fur trapper for a time. Later he operated a flour mill. In 1825, he became a naturalized Mexican citizen, before he married María Encarnación Martínez.

== Workman-Rowland Party ==
In Taos, Rowland became friends and eventually a business partner with William Workman to manufacture "Taos lightning." This was a whisky popular with fur trappers who wintered in town after a long spring, summer and fall period of trapping in the wild. Rowland and Workman were associated with several political events that may have prompted their move to Alta California. For example, a Taos-based revolt seized the government of New Mexico. Ultimately unsuccessful, the rebels had made locals swear loyalty to them. The new governor, Manuel Armijo, was in office when Rowland and Workman were arrested for smuggling, which was a fairly common activity. Their arrest may have been retribution for their feigned loyalty to the Taoseño revolt.

In 1840, Republic of Texas president Mirabeau Lamar announced plans to peaceably annex all territory to the Rio Grande, including all the principal towns of New Mexico. His representative, William G. Dryden, named Rowland and Workman as agents of the Texas government in New Mexico. They were soon replaced and may have had little, if any, active role in promoting the scheme. Still, the two men decided to leave New Mexico, because the annexation scheme developed as an outright invasion from Texas, albeit a poorly planned and executed one that failed miserably.

Before the Texans straggled into New Mexico and were routed, Rowland and Workman, along with about two dozen other Americans and Europeans, had left New Mexico for California via the Old Spanish Trail in early September 1841. On September 6, 1841, some 25 New Mexican immigrants joined the group and left Abiquiú, New Mexico, north of Santa Fe. The arid environment of the trail was known, so this trip was made in the Fall when there was grazing for the animals, as well as watering places. The size of the caravan probably helped it avoid Native American attack.

Although the expedition has often been referred to as an "American wagon train," the Old Spanish Trail never could accommodate wagons. More importantly, the group included European immigrants and New Mexicans, the latter of whom had predominately Native American ancestry. According to Workman and others, the second so-called Workman-Rowland Party arrived in southern Alta California, on November 5, 1841.

== Land grants and ranching ==
In early 1842, Rowland (usually referred to as "John Roland" or "Juan Roland" in the land grant records) petitioned in his name alone for a land grant and received preliminary possession of the 11,740-acre (48 km^{2}) Rancho La Puente.

Possibly with the grant preliminarily secured, Workman remained at La Puente while Rowland returned to New Mexico in April 1842, to retrieve his family. They and other immigrants traveled to California and arrived in December of that same year at Los Angeles. By the next summer, Rowland constructed an adobe home about a mile east of Workman's, which had been built in 1842. They set about improving the land as stipulated in the grant, and probably engaging in the hide and tallow trade.

Nothing more is found about the Mexican land grant until shortly after 1845, when the two participated in the action that ousted the last Mexican governor born outside California in favor of a Californio. Workman, as captain, and Rowland, as lieutenant, were involved in February 1845 by leading a contingent of Californios who helped Pio Pico assume the governorship by force at a battle against Governor Manuel Micheltorena.

In 1845 Rowland had his original grant petition of 1842 extended to encompass 48,790-acre (197 km^{2}). In July 1845 the grant passed judicial confirmation status, making the grant permanent in the names of both Rowland and Workman. The California Commission records do not support that Workman received documentation in 1842 supporting his rights to any part of the grant with Rowland before the 1845 confirmation. The first petition and title refer to "he" or "Roland", whereas the judicial title version of the grant refers to "they."

It is not known whether Workman's questionable political reputation in New Mexico was known in California, or he came under suspicion because of his British ancestry. He did not challenge the 1842 title. At the time, the British were trying to extend their Pacific coast territory south into Alta California before the United States gained the territory in 1848 and later admitted California into the Union.

In 1847, Rowland built the first private grist mill in the Los Angeles region, not far east of his home. Rowland exhibited a sheave of wheat at a California State Fair in the early 1850s, suggesting that he was doing well with his cattle, crops, orchards and vineyards. Rowland and Workman both sold part of their grape crops to winemakers Kohler and Frohling. By the early 1860s, when a touring correspondent visited Workman's place, he described seeing numerous cattle and horses, as well as vineyards and orchards.

The men benefited because San Jose Creek, a tributary of the San Gabriel River, ran through the Rowland-Workman land grant. Rowland could transition from the boom of supplying the 1849 Gold Rush to a livestock-based agrarian economy. He also grew all types of fruits and vegetables.

Rowland and Workman informally divided the grant in about 1851, with Rowland taking about 29,000-acre (117 km^{2}) in the east portion and Workman receiving the 20,000-acre (81 km^{2}) western part. In 1867 they received a US patent for their land, resulting from a 15-year protracted struggle to legitimize their land claim as required by the 1851 California private land claims act. Rowland contacted Henry W. Halleck, who had served as California Secretary of State, for advice on obtaining his patent. Halleck had been the Union Army Chief of Staff under President Abraham Lincoln. He also had submitted one of the two reports to Congress about the viability of California private land claims. Halleck's 1865 response was brief, but to the point: "hire a lawyer and give him plenty of money." This Rowland did, hiring attorney Henry Beard, who prepared a published synopsis of the land claim in 1866 and who was successful in securing the patent.

A deed of partition was not officially recorded until 1868.

Luis Arenas and Rowland were granted Rancho Los Huecos by Governor Pío Pico in 1846. Rowland also claimed eleven square leagues, situated at the confluence of the Stanislaus River and San Joaquin River, granted by Pío Pico in 1846, but the claim was rejected.

Rowland retained most of his La Puente holdings until his death, after which the tract was divided among his second wife and his children. Upon the death of the second Mrs. Rowland, estate distribution was reportedly complicated.

In the 1880s, the railroad boom towns of Puente and Covina were created on the Rowland portion of the rancho. Oil was discovered in the Puente Hills on a section left to youngest son, William R. Rowland, who formed the Puente Oil Company, which became highly successful. Today, heirs of Rowland through his namesake great-grandson, John Rowland IV, still own more than one hundred acres in the City of Industry and Rowland Heights, which are leased for commercial purposes., A ranch house (ca. 1900), an older barn, and a later dwelling were razed for commercial development that has not yet taken place.

== Family life ==
John and Encarnación Rowland had ten children together. Encarnación Rowland died in 1851. Two of their sons, John and Thomas, married daughters of Bernardo Yorba and his wife of the Rancho Cañón de Santa Ana. A third son, William R. Rowland, married Manuelita, a daughter of Isaac Williams, owner of Rancho Santa Ana del Chino, and his wife. William R. Rowland served two-terms as elected Sheriff of Los Angeles. He became president of the Puente Oil Company after 1885, when he found oil on his land in the Puente Hills after 1885.

In 1852, Rowland married Charlotte M. Gray, a widow with three children from her first marriage to the late John B. Gray. Rowland and Charlotte had a daughter, Mary Agnes Gray Rowland. She married General Charles Forman, who later founded the community of Toluca Lake.

John Rowland died in October 1873. He is interred at El Campo Santo Cemetery located on the grounds of the Workman and Temple Family Homestead Museum.

== Legacy ==
The John A. Rowland House, built in 1855 for Rowland's second wife Charlotte, is the oldest surviving brick structure in southern California. It is located on Gale Avenue just inside the boundary of the City of Industry, California, adjacent to the Hacienda-La Puente Unified School District headquarters. The Rowland House is owned by the Historical Society of La Puente Valley, which began initial restoration efforts in 2009.

His name survives in other places: Just east of Hacienda Heights is the unincorporated community of Rowland Heights. It contains John A. Rowland High School. Rowland Avenue in West Covina, California and Rowland Elementary School are also named after him.
