= David W. Alexander =

American politician (1812–1886)

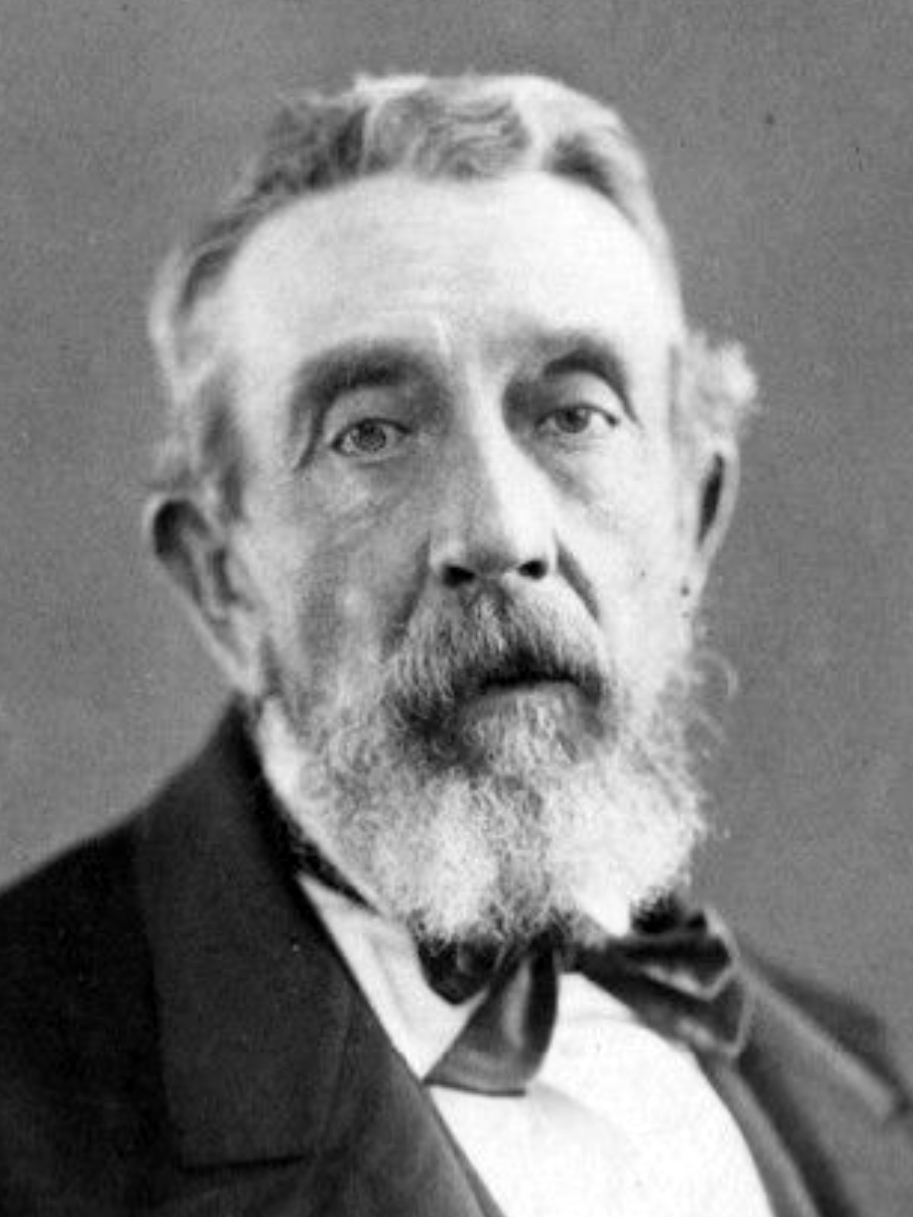
- Born: June 22, 1812; Ireland
- Died: April 29, 1886 (aged 73); Los Angeles, California
- Occupations: Sheriff; County Chair
- Spouse: Adelaida Johnson Mellus
- Children: 5
- Relatives: George C. Alexander (brother)

David Watt Alexander (June 22, 1812 – April 29, 1886) was an early California politician and pioneer in Los Angeles County, California. He was on the Board of Supervisors in 1853 and 1854, and in 1855 he was elected the third sheriff for the county.

== Biography ==
=== Early life ===
David W. Alexander was born on June 22, 1812, in Ireland. He moved to the United States with one of his brothers in 1832. He resided in Philadelphia for three or four years, and from there he went to Rocheport, Missouri. Some say he spent much of his youth in Mexico.

=== Career ===
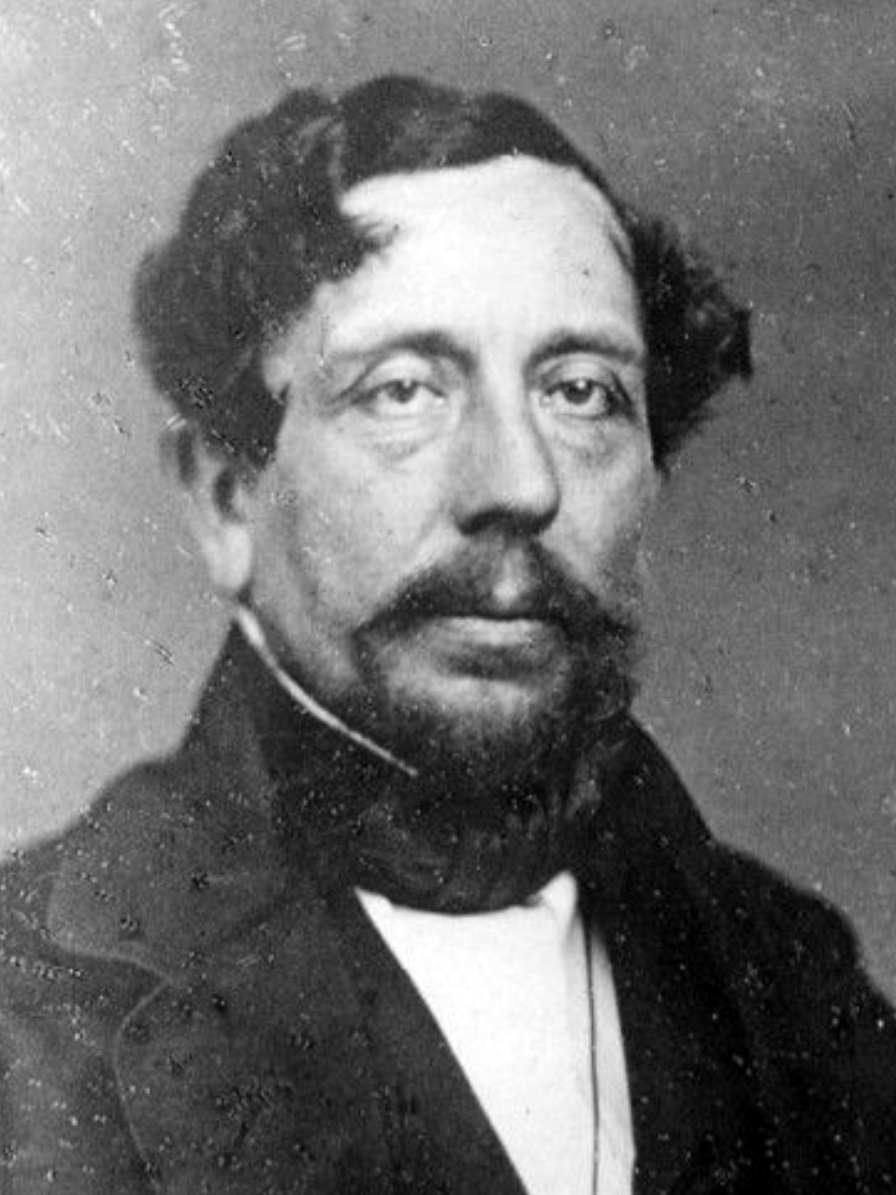
Alexander in his younger years.

He operated a trading company to Santa Fe, New Mexico, in 1837. In 1841 Alexander, he arrived in California, with the Rowland-Workman Party and lived for some time on Rancho El Rincon, in San Bernardino County, California. He then went to the port of San Pedro, where he and John Temple carried on a trading business and general-merchandise store from 1844 till 1849. They also handled the salting and trading of hides, which were "practically the only form of money in the county."

Temple and Alexander created a sensation . . . by bringing in a four-wheel vehicle into the pueblo [of Los Angeles] in January, 1849. Except for a local-made cart belonging to mission priests it was the first carriage seen in southern California. The importation was a rockaway, costing $1000, along with two American horses, all coming from New England around the Horn on the customary windjammer.

He then formed the Alexander and Mellus Company, a mercantile business in Los Angeles, with Francis Mellus (1824–1863). During this time he also formed a partnership with Phineas Banning in San Pedro, until 1855, when he sold his interest. He also became involved in Southern California real estate. In 1851, landowner Vicente de la Osa sold Rancho Providencia to Alexander and Mellus Company. In 1867, he sold Rancho Providencia to David Burbank. The Rancho Tujunga, Rancho Cahuenga and Rancho Providencia were patented to Alexander by the United States courts in 1872.

His brother, George C. Alexander, and Phineas Banning operated Alexander & Banning as a successful freight and stage line, and in 1851 they:

brought in from Salt Lake ten heavy freight wagons, the first seen in this part of the country, and supplemented them later with the purchase of a whole train of 16 wagons and 168 mules from Chihuahua, at a cost of about $30,000. . . . [Later, in February 1855, he] was known to be an experienced frontiersman, and though they had a terrible time of it—they were three days going one mile in San Francisquito Canyon, building the road as they advanced—the train reached Fort Tejon with cargo intact.

During the Mexican War of 1846–47, he favored the Americans and was made a prisoner by the Californios at the Rancho Santa Ana del Chino of Isaac Williams, but he was released on parole. When hostilities ceased, he became regidore from January 2 to June 29, 1850, in the ayumiento. He was the first President of the Los Angeles Common Council, the governing body of the city, in 1850–51, resigning on September 25, 1851. He traveled to Europe in 1852. He was elected a member of the Los Angeles County Board of Supervisors in 1853 and 1854. As a supervisor he "led the movement to lay the first road over the San Fernando Mountains." He was then elected Sheriff of Los Angeles county for the terms of 1855–1856 and 1876–1877.

=== Personal life ===
He married Adelaida Johnson Mellus of Guaymas, Mexico, widow of his former partner, Francis Mellus, on November 7, 1864. Their children were Martha, Elizabeth, Ynez, Joseph W. and Samuel.

=== Death ===
He died in Wilmington on April 29, 1886.

Police appointments
Preceded by James R. Barton	Los Angeles County Sheriff; 1856-1856; 1876-1877	Succeeded by Charles Egbert Hale
Preceded by William R. Rowland	Los Angeles County Sheriff; 1856-1856; 1876-1877	Succeeded by Henry M. Mitchell
