= Flores Daniel Gang =

19th-century criminal gang in California

- Years active: 1856-1857
- Territory: Southern California
- Notable members: Juan Flores, Pancho Daniel

Flores Daniel Gang, was an outlaw gang also known as "las Manillas" (the Handcuffs), throughout Southern California during 1856-1857. The group included Californio's Juan Flores and Pancho Daniel. Contemporary newspaper accounts of las Manillas all reported that the leader of las Manillas was originally Pancho Daniel, but that Juan Flores assumed the leadership role after Daniel was injured in the Barton ambush. According to the account of Harris Newmark, Flores had been sent to prison for horse-stealing and was just another member of the gang.

== Las Manillas ==
After leaving prison, Juan Flores joined with Pancho Daniel and a dozen or so ranch hands, miners and other Angelinos such as Anastasio García, Jesus Espinosa, Andrés Fontes, Chino Varelas, Faustino García, Juan Cartabo and "One-eyed" Piguinino among others. Subsequently, Daniel, Flores and their "los Manilas" gained a following among the Mexican-American population in the San Luis Obispo and San Juan Capistrano areas with his numbers growing to fifty men. One of the largest gangs in the state, "los Manilas" terrorized the San Luis Obispo County and Los Angeles County for the next two years, primarily stealing horses and cattle to sell in Mexico and conducted raids against American settlers homesteads in the area committing armed robbery and murder. Due in part to attention by newspapers, opposition to what became known as the "Flores Revolution" began to take form by public officials and law enforcement as well as upper-class Californios such as Andrés Pico, Juan Sepúlveda and Tomas Avila Sanchez all of whom later participated in the capture of Flores.

== Raid on San Juan Capistrano ==
In late-December 1856 or early-January 1857, Flores attempted to pursue and rob a wagon traveling from Los Angeles to San Juan Capistrano. Missing the wagon somewhere on the road, Flores instead led a group of outlaws on a raid against San Juan Capistrano looting the shop of a local Russian-Polish merchant Michael Krazewski. Wounding a store assistant, they carried nearly all the goods in the store on two horses promising to return to the town. The next day, Flores made another raid on the town in which German shopkeeper George Pflugardt was murdered and several stores were looted. They had been after an informant who had previously testified against him for horse stealing years earlier and, when the man was able to escape before their arrival, they proceeded to loot the town and spent the night "in drunken revelry" until leaving sometime around 2:00 am.

== Barton Ambush ==
On January 22, 1857, after authorities in Los Angeles were alerted of the incident, Sheriff James R. Barton and a posse of Deputies William H. Little, Charles K. Baker, Charles T. Daly and three other well-armed men, set out to capture the gang. The posse headed south, resting for the night, before stopping for breakfast at the main house of the Rancho San Joaquin southwest of the present-day Santa Ana. Don José Antonio Andres Sepúlveda, the ranch owner warned the men that they were extremely outnumbered and should get reinforcements before continuing their pursuit. However, Barton and his men ignored the warning and continued on.

After traveling a further 12 miles south, they were ambushed in the Barranco de los Alisos. Sheriff Barton, Constable Charles Baker, Deputy Charles Daly, and Constable William Little were shot and killed in the ambush or while escaping pursuit, the first lawmen in Los Angeles County to lose their lives in the line of duty. The other three men were able to escape pursuit to tell of the ambush. Within two hours, another posse was formed of some 60 men, who once again went after the outlaws. Under the leadership of James Thompson, who would later become Los Angeles County's sheriff, the posse found the bodies of the four officers.

The bodies of the Sheriff and his posse were recovered by a special party sent out on horseback, escorting several wagons filled with coffins for the purpose and the bodies returned to the city. Harris Newmark described the reception of the bodies and the funeral:

... when the remains were received in Los Angeles on Sunday about noon, the city at once went into mourning. All business was suspended, and the impressive burial ceremonies, conducted on Monday, were attended by the citizens en masse.

== Pursuit, capture and deaths of gang members ==
Barton's death caused a backlash against outlaw violence in the region. Members of Flores' gang were hunted down in Los Angeles and authorities organized a Los Angeles posse that included 51 American merchants and Californio ranchers, Manuel Cota the Temecula leader of 43 Luiseño scouts, the Monte Rangers former Texas Rangers and members of the vigilante gang the "El Monte Boys" led by Dr. Frank Gentry and Bethel Coopwood. Posses from San Bernardino and San Diego and Federal troops from Fort Tejon and San Diego also participated in the manhunt. A large group of the gang were discovered by the Luiseño scouts in their hideout in the Sierra de Santiago. A posse led by the Californios Andrés Pico and Tomas Avila Sanchez, surrounded and apprehended them on what was later called Flores Peak, however Pancho Daniel and Flores himself managed to escape northward through the mountains. The Monte Rangers moving to cut off escapees, captured Flores and Pancho Daniel after a shootout, but they managed to free themselves and escape that night.

After eleven days on the run, Flores was brought in by a 120-man posse led by Andrés Pico. With "practically every man, woman and child present in the pueblo", numbering an estimated 3,000 people, Flores was tried at a public meeting for murder, condemned by vote and hanged near the top of Fort Hill in what would later be present-day downtown Los Angeles on February 14, 1857; Addressing the crowd from the scaffold, he stated "he bore no malice, was dying justly, and that he hoped that those he had wronged would forgive him". When his execution was carried out, his noose being too short, Flores instead died from suffocation instead of having his neck broken as intended.

Meanwhile, numbers ranging from fifty to seventy Mexican-Americans were arrested on having connections with Flores and between February 1857 and November 1858, eleven others suspected of being members of the Flores gang were lynched, mostly by the "El Monte Boys", two by Pio Pico. According to historian John Boessenecker, only four of these men were confirmed as members of the gang.

== Members of the gang and their fate ==
According to Harris Newmark, practically all of the band, were eventually captured. In all, some fifty-two culprits were brought to Los Angeles and lodged in jail. Of that number, eleven were lynched or legally hung.

- Juan Flores, according to Newmark, was twenty-one years of age at the time of his death in 1857. In 1856, he had been sent to prison for horse-stealing. He was just another member of the gang and was caught on the top of a peak in the Santiago range. Condemned by vote at a public meeting, Juan Flores was hanged on February 14, 1857, in Los Angeles up on Fort Hill. Subsequently, Flores has been proposed as having a more prominent role in the gang. According to Horace Bell, Flores was the leader of the gang and Daniel his lieutenant.
- Silvas and Ardillero, according to Newmark, were both captured by Andrés Pico and his party after a hard fight. They were hung on a tree at the spot where they had tried to assassinate Pico and his companions.
- Miguel Blanco, who had stabbed the militiaman, Captain William W. Twist, in order to rob him of a thousand dollars, was held in jail until Thursday, April 23, 1857. The case of Miguel Blanco resulted in acquittal on the same day Jack Powers was in court to have charges against himself dismissed. Blanco seems to have left Los Angeles after he was released and become associated with Pio Linares, an associate of Powers, in San Luis Obispo. Blanco was later found guilty of one of the killings in the Rancho San Juan Capistrano Murders on May 12, 1858, and was hung in that town. The April 25, 1857 Star reported:

"Miguel Blanco, charged with the robbery of Capt. Twist, was acquitted by the jury before the Court of Sessions on Thursday; notwithstanding the identification of the prisoner and the direct testimony of Twist to the main facts of the case as regards him. This appears still more strange when it is known that the prisoner had confessed to the officers his participation in the crime, and what disposition had been made of the booty. But, the confession was not legally before the jury."

- Jesus Espinosa and Lopez, according to Newmark, both members of the band, eluded their pursuers for awhile. They were both caught at San Buenaventura and on the following morning, Espinosa was lynched. Unlike Espinoza, Lopez escaped and eluded pursuit until Feb. 16 when he was recaptured and lynched.
- Luciano Tapía, condemned by vote at a public meeting, executed in Los Angeles February 16, 1857. According to Newmark,

"Tapía's case was rather regrettable, for he had been a respectable laborer at San Luis Obispo until Flores, meeting him, persuaded him to abandon honest work. Tapía came to Los Angeles, joined the robber band and was one of those who helped to kill Sheriff Barton."

- Thomas King, condemned by vote at a public meeting, executed in Los Angeles with Luciano Tapia, February 16, 1857, according to Newmark.
- Three or four members of the Daniel-Flores band were captured and lynched in Little San Gabriel by a posse, led by Deputy Sheriff James F. Burns, according to Newmark.
- Pancho Daniel managed to escape to the north, and was eventually captured in Santa Clara County, in January 1858, and brought to Los Angeles to await trial. On 30 November 1858, a group of citizens of Los Angeles County gathered at the Los Angeles jail where Daniel was being held because they were dissatisfied with the delay in bringing Daniel to justice. Obtaining the keys from the jail keeper by force, some individuals brought Daniel out and hanged him from the cross beams of the jail gate. At the inquest, the judge returned a verdict of 'death from strangulation, by a crowd of persons to the jury unknown'.
- Andrés Fontes, the last surviving member of the Flores-Daniel Gang, was believed to have instigated the events leading to the shooting death of Barton and his party due to a personal disagreement with Sheriff Barton. Fontes was reportedly executed May 1, 1860, in Baja California by its military frontier governor Feliciano Ruiz de Esparza along with Salomon Pico and thirteen other men wanted for crimes in California.
