= Flores Peak =

Mountain peak in Orange County, California

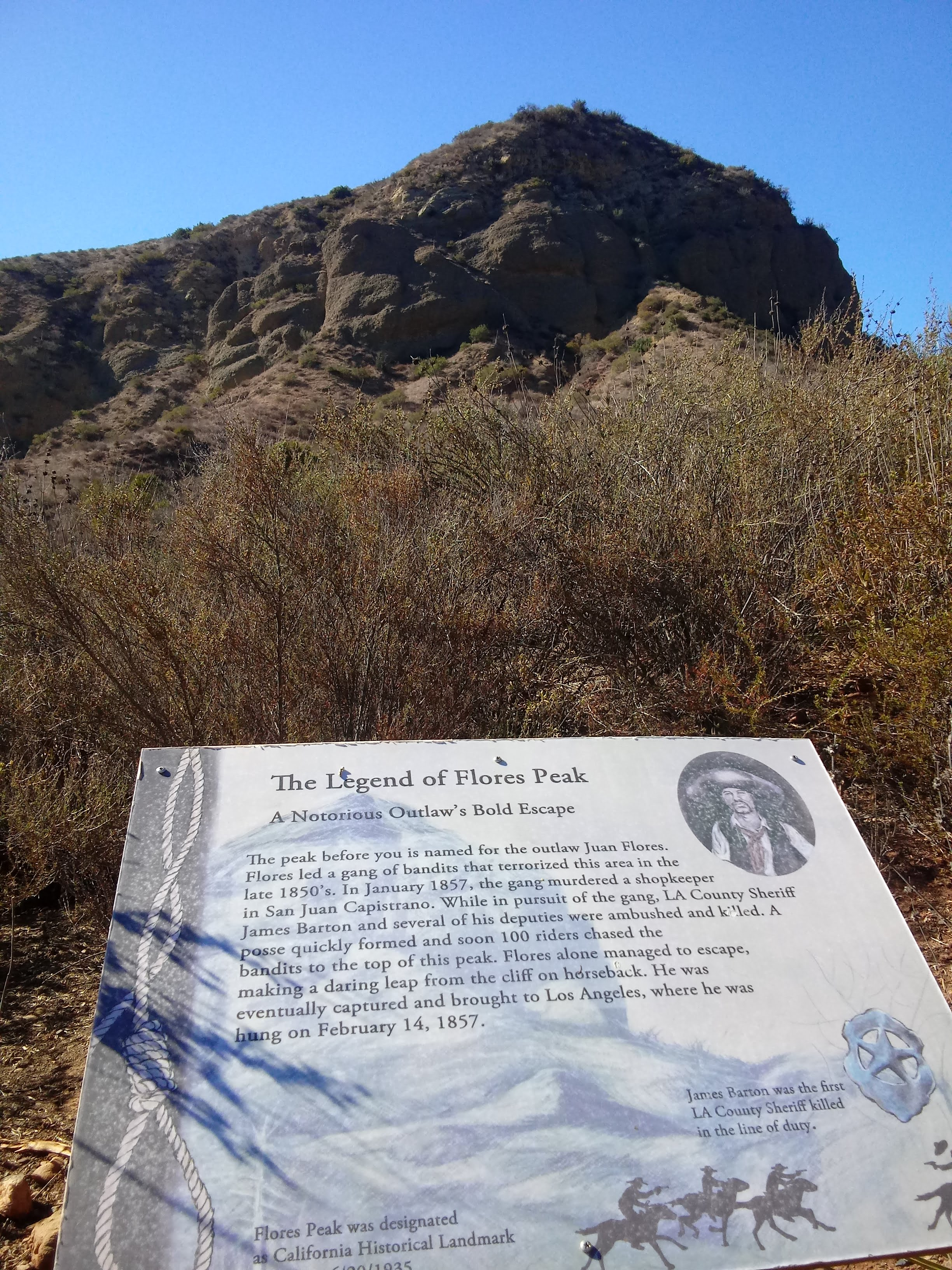
- Flores Peak and sign

- Location within California
- 33°42′40″N 117°37′08″W
- Location: Tucker Wildlife Sanctuary in Santa Ana Mountains

History
- Built: 1857

California Historical Landmark
- Designated: June 20, 1935
- Reference no.: 225

Flores Peak is a mountain peak, overlooking the confluence Harding Canyon and Modjeska Canyon, within the Tucker Wildlife Sanctuary in Orange County, California. It rises to an elevation of 1,834 feet (559 meters). It is named for Juan Flores of the Flores Daniel Gang.

== History ==
Juan Flores and the gang had taken refuge on the peak after killing Los Angeles County Sheriff James R. Barton and three of his posse. Flores made a daring escape from encirclement by a Los Angeles posse led by General Andrés Pico. As part of the posse led by Tomas Avila Sanchez and Bethel Coopwood stormed up the mountain under fire, Flores rode his horse down the steep slope of the peak along with a two others of the gang, while three of the gang were captured there. Flores and another gang member were captured the next day by an El Monte posse led by Frank Gentry, but escaped again that night. However, Flores was later captured in Simi Pass by a detachment of a company of Los Angeles men led by James Thompson, and U. S. Army soldiers from Fort Tejon.,

Flores Peak is California Historical Landmark No. 225 dedicated on June 20, 1935, to commemorate the event.

== Marker ==
Marker Guidebook

- NO. 225 FLORES PEAK – In 1857, Juan Flores and a band of outlaws murdered Sheriff James Barton and part of his posse at Barton Mound. Pursued by a posse led by General Andrés Pico, Flores and his men were finally caught on Flores Peak.

Barton Mound
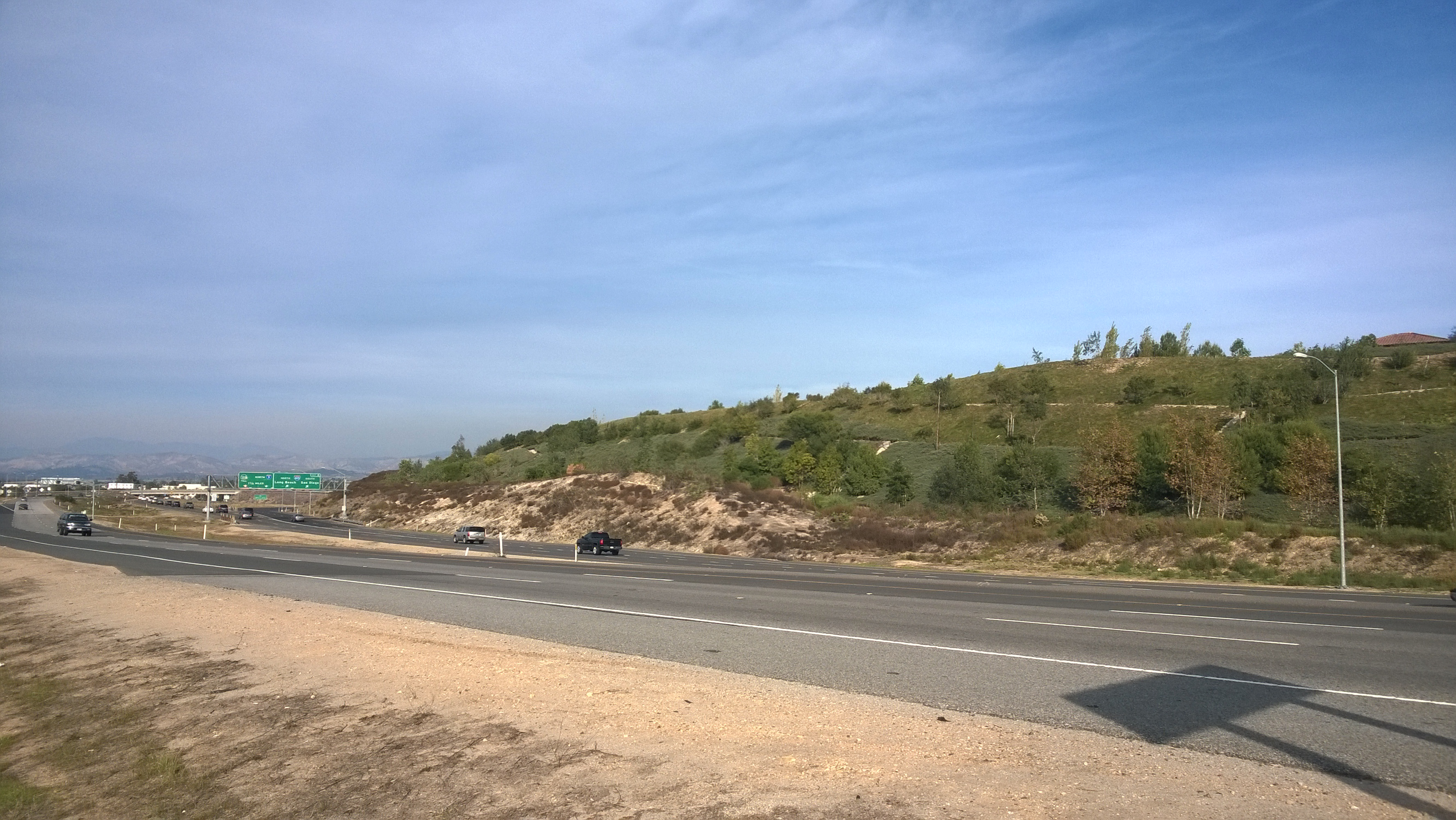
- Barton Mound
- Interactive map of Barton Mound
- Location: Irvine, California

History
- Built: 1857

California Historical Landmark
- Designated: June 20, 1935
- Reference no.: 218

== Barton Mound ==
Barton Mound is the site of a shoot out with Juan Flores. Juan Flores had escaped from San Quentin State Prison. James Barton and his 3 men of his posse were killed on the hill on January 23, 1857. Killed with James Barton were Constable Charles Baker, Deputy Charles Daly, and Constable William Little. The hill was named in his honor. James R. Barton (1810– January 23, 1857) was the second sheriff of Los Angeles County, and the first to die in office in the line of duty. The Flores Daniel Gang was hunted down and 52 gang members were arrested and 18 gang members were hung for the murder of the four Lawman. James Barton had been with the Los Angeles County Sheriff's Department for five years. Barton Mound is now a housing development in East Irvine, California at the Southeast corner of the Interstate 405 and California State Route 133. The hill is a California Historical Landmarks #218.

California State Historical Landmark No. 218 records: (The marker is gone)

- NO. 218 BARTON MOUND – Juan Flores, who had escaped from San Quentin, was being sought by James Barton with a posse of five men. Near this mound, Flores surprised Barton and three of his men, all four were killed. When Los Angeles learned of the slaughter, posses were formed, and Flores and his men were captured.

== See also ==
- California Historical Landmarks in Orange County, California

The Historical Marker for Barton Mound was replaced in early 2024 through a combined effort of the Los Angeles County Sheriffs Department, the Sheriffs Relief Association, the City of Irvine, the Irvine Police Department and the Irvine Company
