= Salomón Pico =

American Californio bandit

- Born: September 5, 1821; Rancho del Rey San Pedro (now Salinas, California)
- Died: May 1, 1860 (aged 39); Baja California
- Cause of death: Execution
- Known for: 19th century Californio bandit

Salomón María Simeon Pico (Sept. 5, 1821 – May 1, 1860) was a Californio, a cousin of former governor Pío Pico, who led a bandit band in the early years following the Mexican–American War in the counties of the central coast of California. Pico was considered by some Californios to be a patriot who opposed the American conquest of Alta California and its subsequent incorporation into the United States. He was hated for his banditry by the newly arrived Americans but protected by some Californios as a defender of his people.

== Early life ==
Salomón Pico was a member of the Pico family of California, a prominent Californio family. He was born on the Rancho del Rey San Pedro near Salinas, California and baptized at Mission San Juan Bautista. His father was José Dolores Pico, a soldier with the Presidio of Monterey. Antonio Maria Pico (1809–1869) and José de Jesús Pico (1806–1892) were his brothers.

José Pico had spent a long career with the military, but by 1821 was partially retired as a manager for the King's Ranch, which provided food, leather, and other supplies to the Presidio. Salomón's mother, Maria Ysabel Cota, came from Santa Barbara. Salomón spent his early life on the Rancho del Rey, but returned to Monterey pueblo with his mother when his father died in 1827. Monterey was the capital of Alta California, and here Salomón was exposed to education and international influences not available on the Rancho.

By 1840, Pico was courting a young lady who lived near his brother's home in Pueblo de San José. On December 13, 1840, Pico married Juana Vasquez at Mission Santa Cruz. They made their home at first in Monterey, where children began arriving regularly. In 1844, Pico received a Mexican land grant of 58,000 acres (230 km^{2}) in the San Joaquin Valley, somewhere near the Stanislaus River and the San Joaquin River in what is now Stanislaus County. The couple's fourth child was baptized at the Santa Clara Mission.

== Mexican American War and the Gold Rush ==
Pico fought with the Mexican army against the United States during the Mexican–American War. His name appears with the rank of Ensign on a captured, September 7, 1846, letter by General José Castro to the Minister of War and Marine. He is listed as one of the officers accompanying Governor Castro back to Mexico. There are family stories that indicate he served as a scout and soldier during this time.

By the time California had been annexed to the United States, he was probably back on his ranch with his family. With a population of around 10,000 non-Indians in the territory of California, it was still a small community in 1847. On January 24, 1848, gold was discovered at Sutter's Mill. In August of that year, the gold rush flooded onto Pico's land. Exactly what happened isn't known, but Juana did not long survive. Salomón took her to Monterey to get medical help, but on November 19, 1848, she died there.

== Outlaw years ==
=== Central Coast ===
Salomón Pico is said to have vowed revenge. Avoiding the gold fields, he moved to the vicinity of Rancho Los Alamos in what is now Santa Barbara County. By day, he became a stock dealer, trading in horses and cattle. In southern California, there was little gold mined, but great numbers of cattle were raised, giving the area the name the "Cow Counties". Where formerly cattle were raised mostly for their hides, now with the high demand for food in the northern mines, the price of cattle there made it very profitable to drive these same cattle north. Men would ride south with the large amounts of gold dust, to buy stock, then drive them north to sell for a profit. Salomón Pico was in a perfect position to meet and discover the plans of these men.

By night, Salomón Pico with his gang, worked El Camino Real south of what is today Santa Maria, ambushing the men riding south from the gold fields, who were often carrying gold to be used to buy herds of cattle. Many of these parties of two or three, were never heard of again after passing San Luis Obispo. In later years, numbers of human skeletons were found in the countryside with a bullet hole in the skull, accounting for the mysterious disappearances of so many cattle traders. The victims were mostly Americans whom the Californios felt were enemies, and the crimes which the gang committed were never divulged by the locals, or if brought to trial, resulted in an acquittal because in this region the Californios were still in the majority and Pico was connected to its influential members.

The gang avoided conflicts with county officials, who in turn seemed to let the bandits alone. Although on one occasion, when delivering a writ to a local rancho, the Sheriff of Santa Barbara came face to face with Salomón Pico who had been waiting for him on the trail, thinking him a possible target for robbery. For some hours the two maneuvered to get or retain the advantage. Pico tried to get behind the Sheriff, the Sheriff maneuvered to keep Pico before him; until Pico realized he was recognized and was dealing with a formidable opponent. The Sheriff identified himself and ordered Pico to ride away and after getting out of pistol shot, bid the Sheriff "Adios" with a wave and rode away.

Pico had a land grant he could not enforce against the many squatters on the land he couldn't use, he wasn't ready to remarry yet, and his lifestyle precluded luxury. It is not known exactly what happened to all that gold he took, but it is known that his popularity soared very quickly among his own people. By 1851 he was fully established as a flamboyant outlaw with a loyal gang and a following among his people. He had become so popular, that with a knock on the door and an urgent request for shelter, he could ride his horse right into people's homes and so elude the pursuit of any posse.

Salomón Pico's career as a bandit around Rancho Los Alamos came to its end in 1851, after John Caldwell, a mail rider between Monterey and Los Angeles, was murdered in the lower Salinas Valley on June 8, 1851. A party of volunteers pursued the murderers, and near San Luis Obispo, captured a group of men, that included Solomon Pico and William Otis Hall, an American. These men were tried at a vigilante court and were sentenced to be hanged but the civil authorities rescued them before the sentence could be carried out. Pico, because the standing of his cousin Pío Pico in the community, was freed on bail. The other captured Californios were also released on various pretexts, only William Otis Hall remained in custody. On the night of August 9, vigilantes broke into the jail and enforced the ruling of their court. Otis was hanged on the door of the jail, becoming the first known lynch mob victim in the central coast region. Under the threat of a similar fate Pico quickly fled the region. However members of his gang and others continued to plague the central coast region for many years, under new leaders like Pio Linares and Jack Powers.

=== Los Angeles County ===
Salomón Pico thought to have moved south to Los Angeles County and been protected by local Californios. On the evening of December 12, 1851, he attempted the assassination of Judge Benjamin Ignatius Hayes. Judge J. S. Mallard, Justice of the Peace and of the Court of Sessions had issued an arrest warrant for Benito Lugo, Francisco Lugo, and Mariano Elisalde, accused murderers of some Americans in the Cajon Pass. Hayes believed the Lugo's had hired Pico to dispose of the Judge and mistook Judge Hayes for Judge Mallard who shared the same office. Pico was wounded in the arm later that night when Sheriff James R. Barton discovered his hideout and exchanged shots with him. The following morning Pico had his arm dressed in Los Angeles without the Sheriff being alerted, protected by his Californio and American friends.

In November 1852, following the murder of Major General Joshua H. Bean, renewed efforts were made to rid the county of a suspected gang of highwaymen infesting it. A determined effort was made to arrest the leaders and break up the organization of the gang. The Vigilance Committee of Los Angeles caused the arrest of several Mexicans thought to belong to Salomón Pico's band, including Reyes Feliz, who made a confession that before he came south to Los Angeles he was in the company of Joaquin Murrieta and Pedro Gonzales was robbing with him, and included a confession of the murder of a Mexican while at the mines, but professed ignorance of General Bean's death, or of any person accessory to it. Reyes Feliz was convicted and executed for his confessed murder. He was followed, similarly, soon afterward by at least two of the other men arrested. Finding Southern California too hot for him, pursued by the Los Angeles Rangers, Pico fled to Baja California to avoid capture. The New York Times of April 26, 1853, reported news from San Diego on March 17:

Solomon Pico, the notorious horse thief, whose robberies and acts were at one time almost as notorious in the lower country, although not so bloody, as those of the celebrated Joaquin have been above, is lying very sick at the town of Santo Tomas, in Lower California.

Pico became an associate of José Castro who had been living in San Juan Bautista until 1853, when he returned to Mexico and was made political chief of the Baja California frontier in 1856.

== Life in Mexico ==
Pico had made frequent visits south of the border, and by 1857 he moved to Santo Tomas, Baja California, Mexico, where he accepted a position as captain of the guard for the military commander of the frontier of Baja California, Colonel José Castro (former governor of Alta California and Pico's superior in the war). Castro made many land grants in Baja California to friends and supporters including a grant to Salomón Pico of 11 Leagues of vacant lands of La Frontera.

It was in his official capacity that Pico was guarding the jail when four American businessmen from San Diego were placed there to await trial. Emotions on both sides of the border were running at fever pitch, and the threat of a race war was on everyone's mind. When a mob of Mexicans marched on the jail to lynch the Americans, Salomón Pico alone stepped between them, and talked the mob into going home. He had made the final step to become a defender of justice not only for his own people, but for all peoples.

On April 14, 1860, Col. Castro was killed by a man named Marquez, who was under indictment for murder at Los Angeles. His successor in command of the Baja California frontier, Feliciano Ruiz de Esparza, decided to rid La Frontera of California outlaws infesting the region. On May 1, 1860, he rounded up and executed 15 such men including Solomon Pico.

== Legacy ==
Pico is one of the historical figures associated with the Zorro character. The author, Johnston McCulley, drew inspiration from the tales of the exploits of bandits in California in the 1850s. Some have claimed the resemblance of Pico to the fictional Zorro is strong. Like Zorro, Salomón lived a dual life, defending justice by night, riding a powerful steed and trusting to the loyal support of his people. Some of the stories from his outlaw years connect clearly with certain aspects of the Zorro legend.

There is a restaurant in current day Los Alamos, CA, that is named after Pico, called Pico. It is the former Los Alamos General Store, which was claimed to be one of Pico's hangouts.

A newspaper article published in 1925, claimed Pico carried with him a string of ears, removed from his victims to mark them forever; proof that they had met him. Contemporary accounts of Pico make no such claims. Collecting the ears of his victims seems to have been borrowed from Hubert Howe Bancroft's account of the conduct of Domingo Hernandez, a California bandit contemporary with Pico, that operated from the vicinity of Monterey northward.

== See also ==
- Andrés Pico (1810–1876)
- Solomon Hills
