= Vicente de la Osa =

Californio landowner (1808–1861)

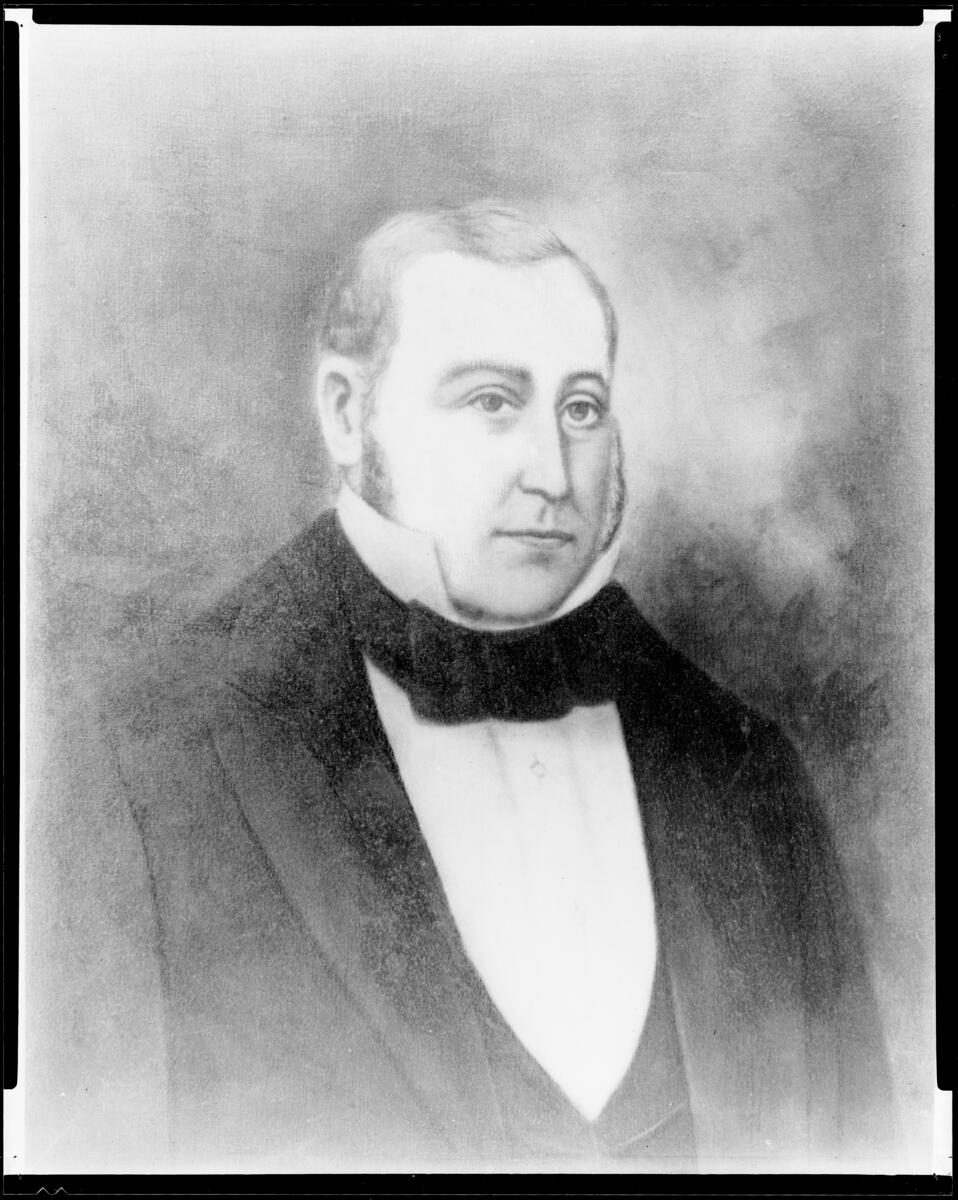
- Portrait of Vincente de la Osa (USC/CHS)
- Born: January 6, 1808; Presidio of San Diego
- Died: July 20, 1861 (aged 53); Los Angeles County, California, U.S.

Vicente de la Osa (January 6, 1808 – July 20, 1861), baptized Jose Vicente de los Reyes de la Ossa, was a Californio city official, tavern owner, and cattle rancher who owned Rancho Providencia and Rancho Los Encinos in what is now the San Fernando Valley area of Southern California in the United States.

== Biography ==
De la Osa was born at the Presidio of San Diego, where his father was a corporal. After his mother died when he was a baby he moved to Mexico as a child, then back to Los Angeles where he became a Pueblo of Los Angeles official, serving as secretary, councilman and "syndic". He married Rita Guillen at Mission San Gabriel in 1832. In addition to serving as a public official he owned and operated a tavern.

He was formally granted Rancho Providencia in 1843. Six years later he sold Providencia and "bought an approximate third of Rancho del Encino. He sold La Providencia for 1,500 pesos and paid 100 pesos for the first of several purchases that before long gave him the use of the entire ranch". De la Osa built a nine-room adobe near the Encino Springs in 1849. The residential adobe still stands at Los Encinos State Historic Park, but there was originally a second adobe, now long gone, "believed to have some fourteen rooms, housed the storage, work rooms and employee quarters".

After the decline of the California Gold Rush-fueled cattle boom, de la Osa "compensated by establishing a small vineyard, raising some sheep, and letting out rooms to travelers". In 1856 and 1859 he held a relic political position called Judge of the Plains that adjudicated disputes between ranchers. De la Osa died in 1861 leaving a pregnant wife with 12 children; Rita de la Osa later sold Rancho Los Encinos to one of her daughters and a son-in-law who served as Los Angeles county sheriff.

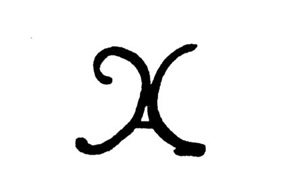
Rancho de Los Encinos cattle brand of Don Vicente de la Osa

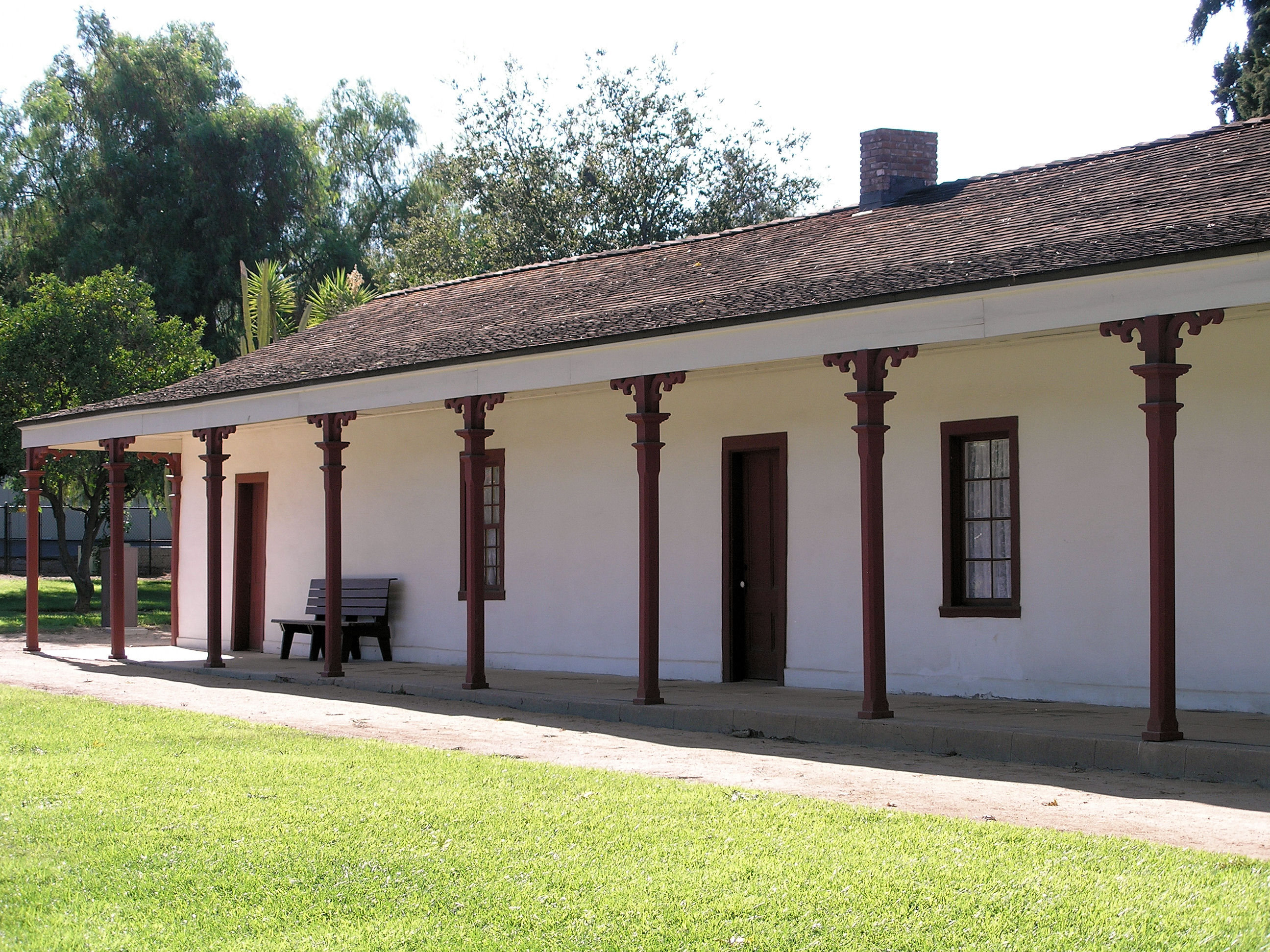
The adobe house built by Vicente de la Osa at Rancho Los Encinos

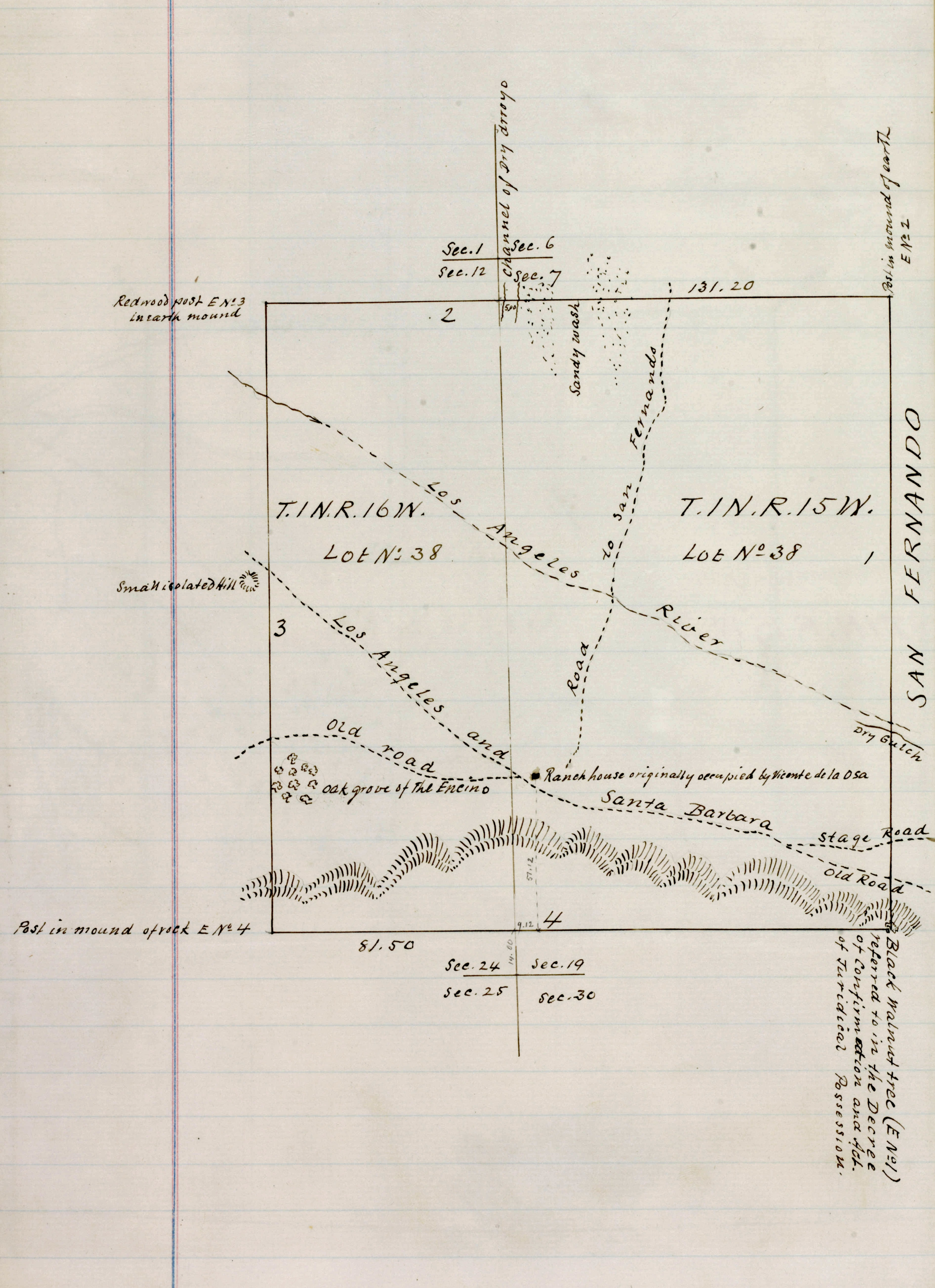
Rancho Encino, 1868 survey showing location of de la Osa adobe

De La Osa Street in Los Angeles is named for Vincente de la Osa.

== See also ==
- Encino Hot Springs
- Ranchos of Los Angeles County
