= Rancho La Providencia =

Mexican land grant in Southern California

Coordinates: 34.180°N 118.328°W

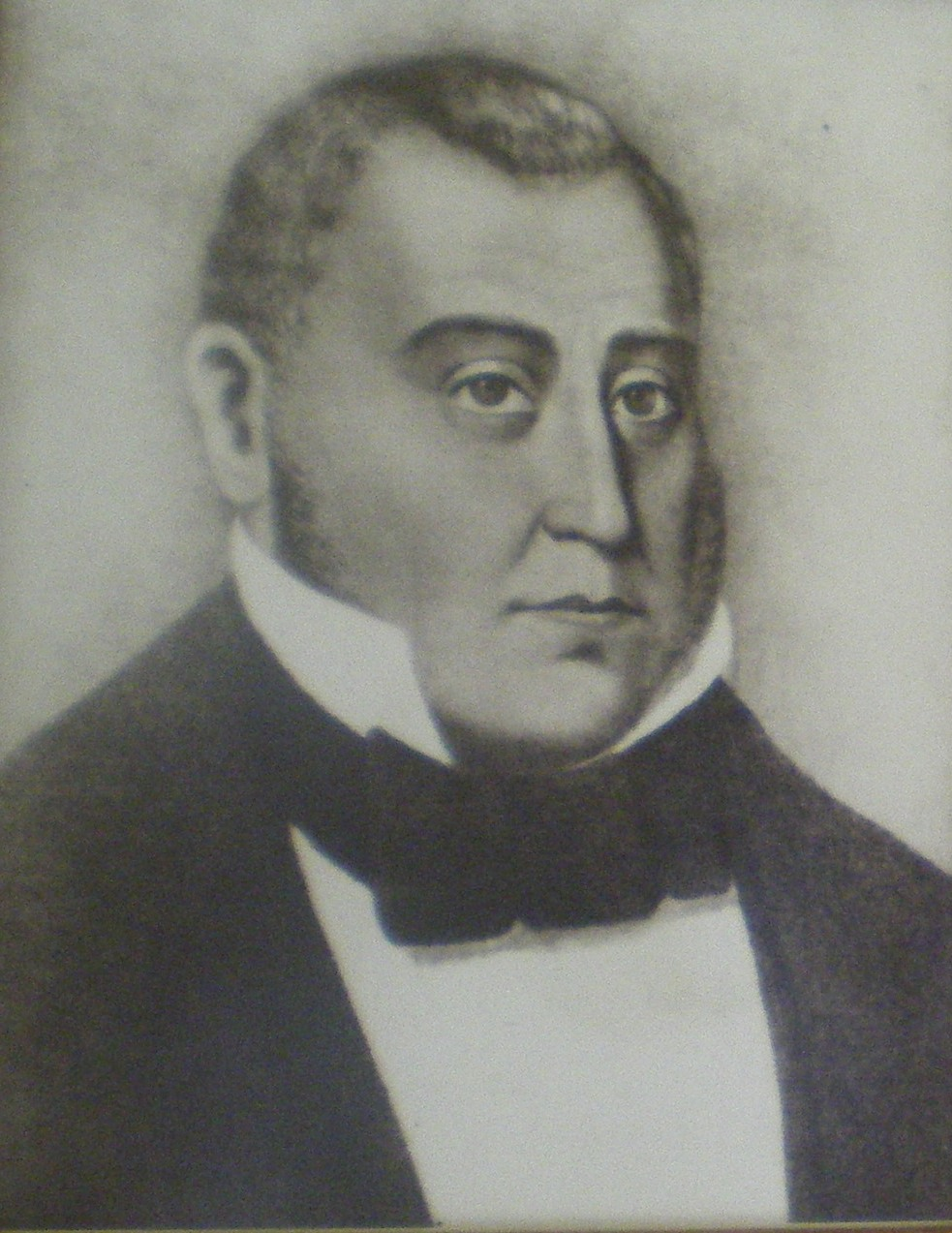
Vicente de la Ossa was granted Rancho Providencia in 1843 by Governor Juan Bautista Alvarado.

Rancho La Providencia was a 4,064-acre (16.45 km^{2}) Mexican land grant in present-day Los Angeles County, California, given by governor Juan B. Alvarado in 1843 to Vicente de la Osa. The majority of Rancho Providencia land north of the modern channel of the Los Angeles River is now part of Burbank. The street grid change along Burbank Boulevard marks the northwestern boundary of the rancho grant. The Walt Disney Studios, Warner Bros. Studios, NBC Studios Burbank, Providence High School, and Providence Saint Joseph Medical Center are all within the former boundaries of Rancho Providencia. The Burbank Equestrian Center and portions of the Rancho south of the river are now part of the city of Los Angeles.

== History ==
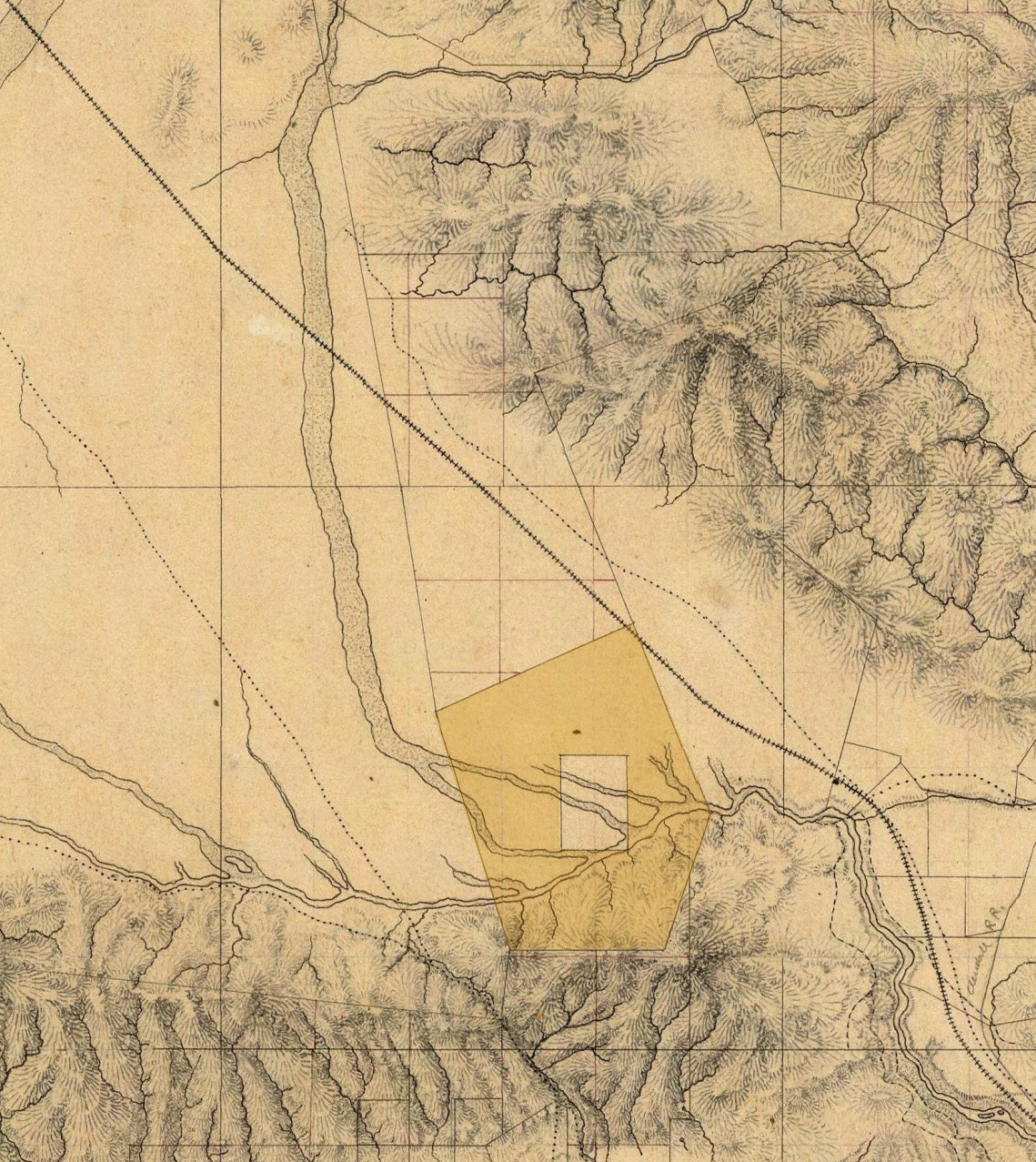
Detail of the southeastern San Fernando Valley, from a manuscript map of Los Angeles and San Bernardino topography, 1880, showing the Rancho Cahuenga inholding within Rancho Providencia (shaded area, added).

In 1834, Vicente de la Ossa (January 6, 1808 - 1861) was elected as Los Angeles councilman and served in this capacity for two years. In 1843, he was granted the one square league Rancho Providencia located northwest of the pueblo. In 1849 de la Ossa sold Rancho La Providencia to David W. Alexander, and bought an approximate third of Rancho Los Encinos.

With the cession of California to the United States following the Mexican-American War, the 1848 Treaty of Guadalupe Hidalgo provided that the land grants would be honored. As required by the Land Act of 1851, a claim for Rancho Providencia was filed with the Public Land Commission in 1852, and the grant was patented David W. Alexander and Francis Mellus in 1872.

In 1867, Alexander sold Rancho Providencia to David Burbank, a dentist and entrepreneur from Los Angeles. Burbank had also acquired Rancho Cahuenga, a 388 acres (2 km^{2}) inholding within the boundaries of Rancho Providencia. Burbank also purchased 4,607 acres (19 km^{2}) of Rancho San Rafael from Jonathan R. Scott in 1867. Burbank combined his properties into a nearly 9,000-acre (36 km^{2}) cattle ranch.

Burbank sold his holdings in 1886 to Los Angeles land speculators who formed the "Providencia Land, Water & Development Company", with Burbank as one of the directors. The land was surveyed and a business district was laid out, surrounded by residential lots. The outlying area was divided into small farms. They named the town Burbank and opened the tract for sale on May 1, 1887. The City of Burbank was incorporated in 1911.

== See also ==
- Battle of Providencia
- Providencia Ranch
- History of the San Fernando Valley to 1915
- Ranchos of California
- List of Ranchos of California
- David W. Alexander, 19th century Los Angeles, California, politician and sheriff
