= John A. Rowland House =

Historic house in California, United States

- U.S. National Register of Historic Places
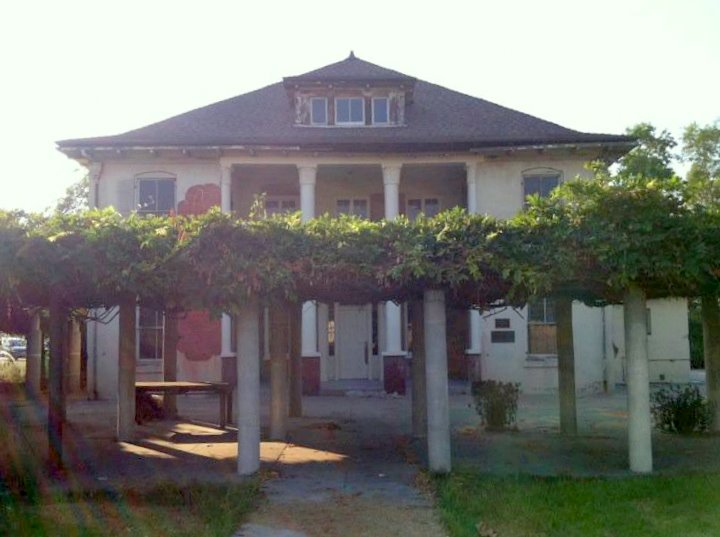
- John A. Rowland House October 14, 2010

- Location within the Los Angeles metropolitan area Location within California Location within the United States
- Location: 16021 E. Gale Ave., Industry, California
- Coordinates: 34°0′39″N 117°57′24″W
- Built: 1855
- Architectural style: Greek Revival
- NRHP reference No.: 73000403
- Added to NRHP: July 16, 1973

John A. Rowland House in the City of Industry, California, was built in 1855. It was the home of pioneer John A. Rowland, a member of the Workman-Rowland party and co-leader of the first American group of settlers to reach Southern California in 1841. John A. Rowland built this home for his second wife, Charlotte M. Gray.

The John Rowland House is noteworthy for being the oldest surviving brick structure in Southern California. Built in 1855, it features Greek Revival Architecture, chosen by John Rowland. Victoria, his daughter from his second marriage, inherited the home and married Capt. John W. Hudson in 1879. Their daughter inherited the property and, in 1920, married William Dibble of Oakwell Rancho in Covina. The house underwent numerous improvements in the 2000s and 2010s, due to earthquake damage.

The property was added to the National Register of Historic Places by the National Park Service - United States Department of the Interior in 1973.

== Public access ==
The John A. Rowland House is maintained by the La Puente Valley Historical Society (LPVHS). Due to ongoing restoration efforts, the house and adjacent property were closed to the public for multiple years.

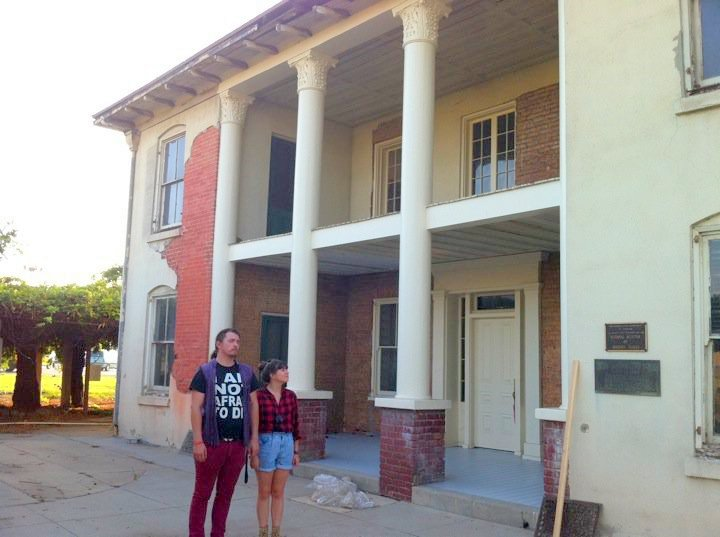
Descendants of John A. Rowland, Justin and Alyssa Collins (brother and sister), in front of the home October 14, 2010

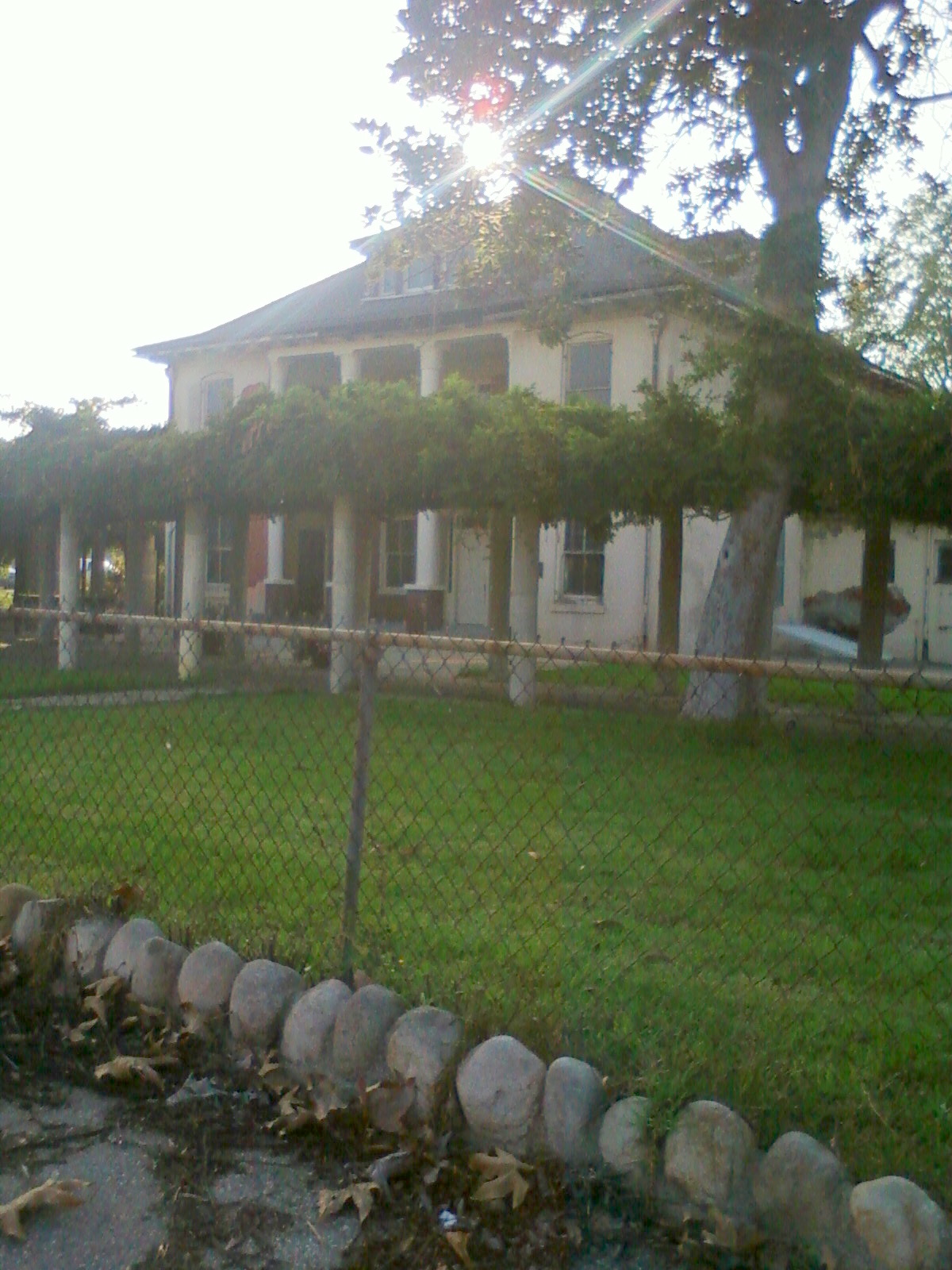
Rowland House October 14, 2010

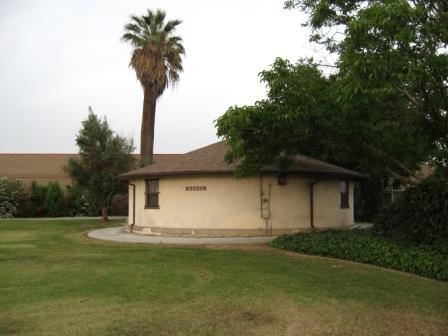
Dibble Museum (former coach house of John A. Rowland House) in 2009

== Re-opened as the John Rowland Mansion ==
On July 20, 2024, the John A. Rowland House, now referred to as the John Rowland Mansion, re-opened to the public. In partnership with the alternative preservation agency House Museum, the historic site debuted 11 new site-specific artworks by David Horvitz, Emily Barker, and Evan Curtis Charles Hall, to complement the property's permanent Rowland family exhibition.

The John Rowland Mansion received revitalization support from Los Angeles County Supervisor Hilda. L Solis, First District, Mayor of City of Industry, Cory C. Moss, Neon Cowboys, and Penn Club LA.

In an interview with the San Gabriel Valley Tribune, Amy Rowland, president of the La Puente Valley Historical Society and 6th generation Rowland stated: “I want to preserve our Rowland heritage and La Puente’s history. It’s a unique connection to Southern California and deserves restoration and attention. People need to know how the community came to be and what life was like before California became a state.”

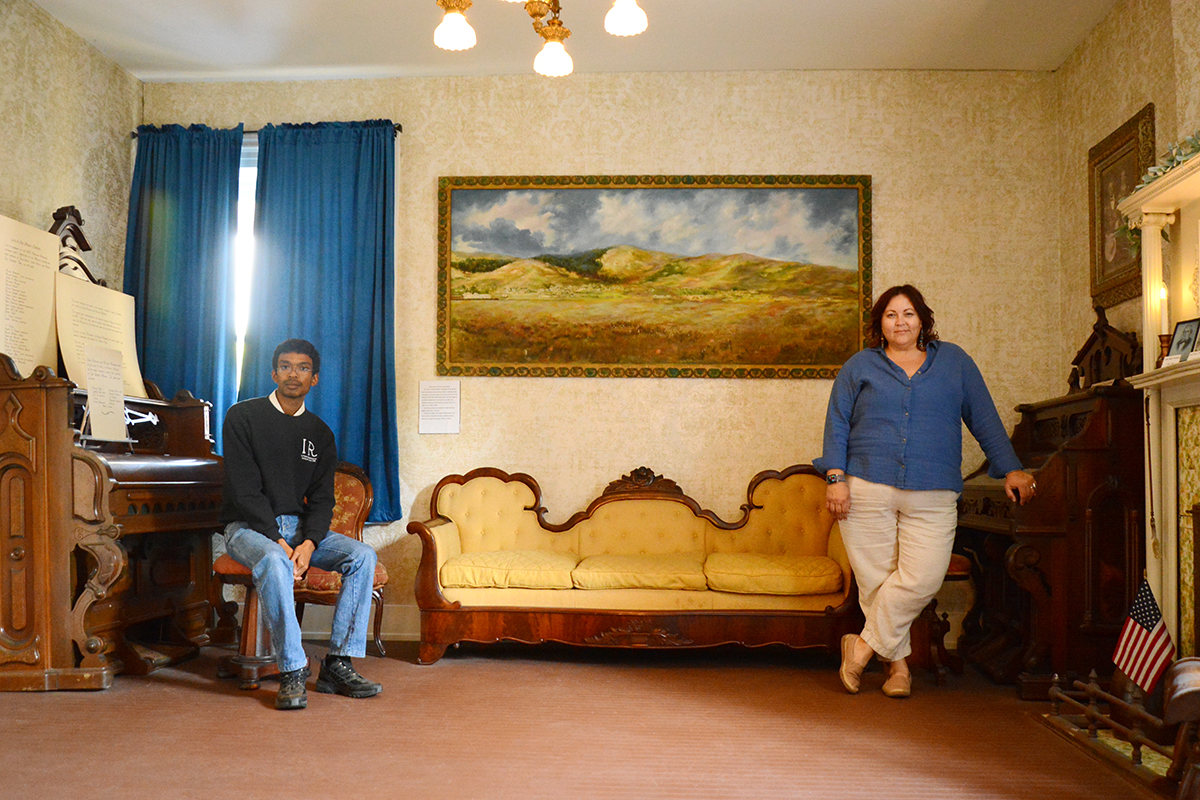
Evan Curtis Charles Hall, House Museum, and Amy Rowland, La Puente Valley Historical Society, in the John Rowland Mansion Parlor, April 2024

The historic site is now open to the public with limited visiting hours.
