= William R. Rowland =

American landowner & eleventh Sheriff of Los Angeles County (1846-1926)

William Richard Rowland
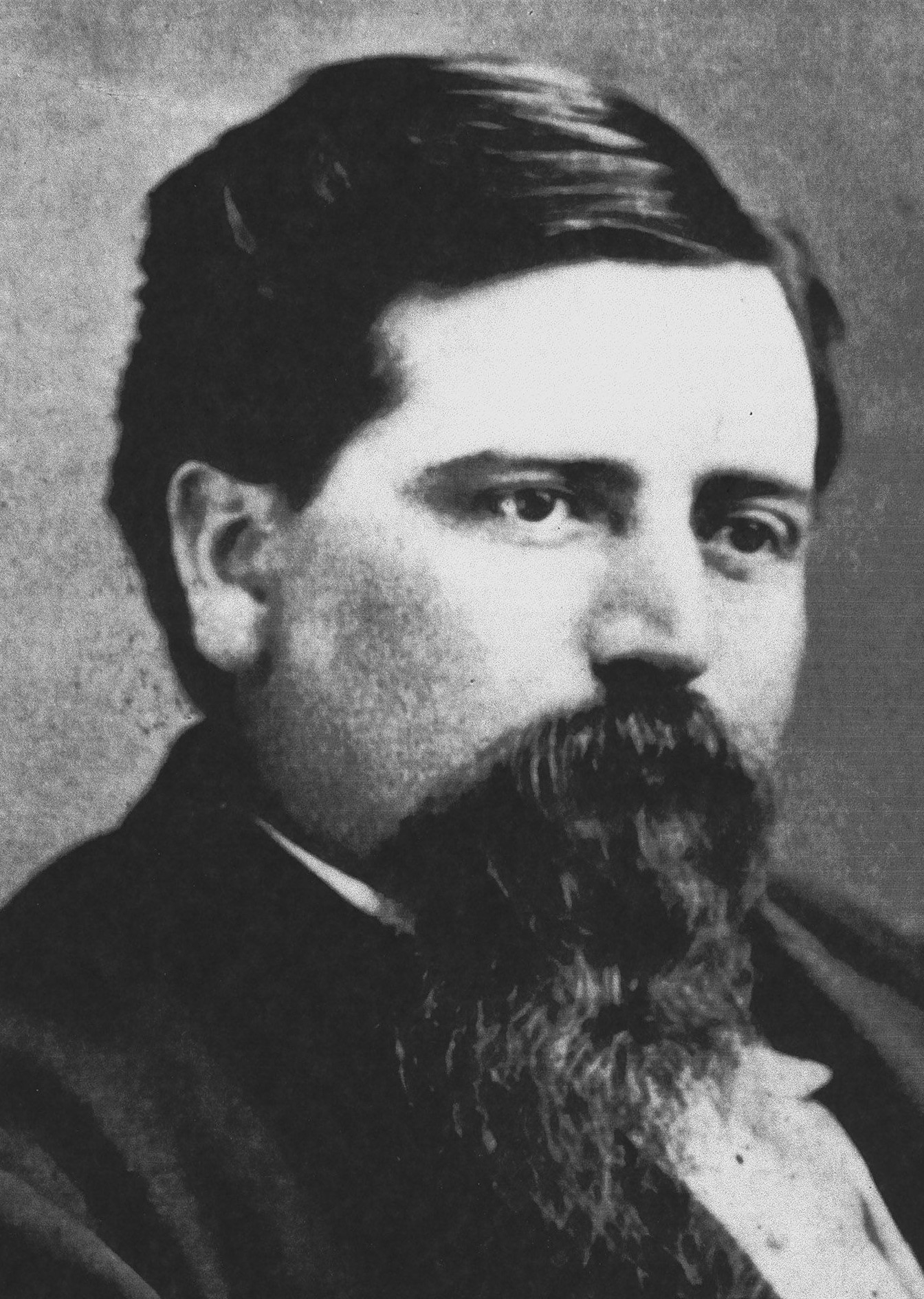
- Rowland in an undated picture

Sheriff of Los Angeles County
- In office 1871 – 1875, 1880–1882
- Preceded by: James F. Burns
- Succeeded by: David W. Alexander, Alvan T. Currier

Personal details
- Born: November 11, 1846; Rancho La Puente, California, United States
- Died: February 4, 1926 (aged 79); Los Angeles, California, United States
- Spouse: Dona Manuela Williams
- Children: Mrs. C.E. Toland, Mrs. E. Clarence Moore
- Profession: Landowner, Sheriff

William Richard Rowland (November 11, 1846 – February 4, 1926) was the eleventh sheriff of Los Angeles County, California, and a large landowner in the La Puente area of the San Gabriel Valley. He organized the posse and crafted the successful strategy that resulted in the wounding and capture of notorious bandit Tiburcio Vasquez in 1874. He did not accompany the posse himself for fear of the tactic becoming known. Rowland discovered oil in the Puente Hills and founded the Puente Oil Company, one of the oldest such endeavors in California.

Rowland was born on November 11, 1846, at Rancho La Puente, the son of John Albert and Dona Incarnación Martinez Rowland. John was born in Pennsylvania and worked in agriculture. Incarnacion was the daughter of Jose Felipe DeJesus Martinez of Taos, New Mexico. He was elected and became sheriff in 1871, when he was 26 years old, still the youngest as of 2011. He was the county's first sheriff of Latino descent.

He was married to Dona Manuela Williams. Manuela was the daughter of Col. Isaac Williams of Rancho Santa Ana del Chino. They had two daughters, Mrs. C.E. (or Mrs. Clarence G.)Toland and Mrs. E. Clarence (Helen) Moore, and two grandchildren, William Rowland Moore and Helen Moore.

While living in La Puente, Rowland commuted daily to his Los Angeles office via the Los Angeles and Salt Lake Railroad.

Rowland was a member of the Church of the Immaculate Conception. He died of a heart attack February 4, 1926, in the family home at 805 Bonnie Brae Street, Los Angeles, after a five-year illness. A solemn requiem mass was held at the Saint Vibiana Cathedral, at which pallbearers included noted civic leaders like William Mulholland, the father of the Los Angeles Aqueduct. Bishop John J. Cantwell eulogized:

He was one of the pioneer sons of the Golden West and he saw a great city growing up around him. He used opportunities that were in his path to build things that were worthy of an honorable citizen.

His left an estate of $1,257,186, including land and holdings valued at $1 million.

== See also ==
- List of past Los Angeles County Sheriffs

Police appointments
Preceded by James F. Burns	Los Angeles County Sheriff; 1871-1875; 1880-1882	Succeeded by David W. Alexander
Preceded by Henry M. Mitchell	Los Angeles County Sheriff; 1871-1875; 1880-1882	Succeeded by Alvan T. Currier
