= Pancho Daniel =

American outlaw who was lynched in November 1858

- Died: 1858; Los Angeles, California
- Cause of death: Lynching
- Occupation: Bandit

Pancho Daniel (?–1858) was a Californio bandit, leader of the Flores Daniel Gang who was lynched in November 1858 while awaiting trial for his involvement in the murder of Los Angeles County Sheriff James R. Barton.

== Biography ==
Together with Juan Flores, Pancho Daniel led a band of fifty robbers in California. In 1857, the gang was reported to have robbed and murdered a German shopkeeper named George W. Pflugardt. Sheriff James Barton investigated the murder and, despite being warned against pursuing the band, he began to search for them. They were ambushed by the gang and Barton was killed, along with four of the men with him. Pancho Daniel was eventually captured in January 1858, and brought to Los Angeles to await trial.

Daniel's defense attorney, Captain Cameron E. Thom, was dissatisfied with the jury that had been appointed for Daniel's trial, on the basis that he considered them unable to deliver an impartial verdict. When Judge Benjamin Ignatius Hayes dissolved this jury and appointed a new one, Thom insisted that the judge dissolve this one as well. Upon examining the third jury, Thom asserted that no jurors from Los Angeles would be able to be impartial in the case and requested for a trial in Santa Barbara County.

On 30 November 1858, a group of citizens of Los Angeles County gathered at the Los Angeles jail where Daniel was being held, dissatisfied with the delay in bringing Daniel to justice. Obtaining the keys from the jail keeper by force, some individuals brought Daniel out and hanged him from the cross beam of the jail gate. At the inquest, the judge returned a verdict of 'death from strangulation, by a crowd of persons to the jury unknown'.

California Governor John B. Weller labelled this lynching as a 'barbarous and diabolical execution', issuing a reward of $1000 for the arrest of the perpetrators. Despite this, those responsible were never identified.
