= George T. Burrill =

1st Sheriff of Los Angeles County

- Born: 1810
- Died: February 2, 1856; Los Angeles, California
- Occupations: Sheriff

George T. Burrill (1810–1856) was the first sheriff of Los Angeles County, California.

== Early life ==
George Thompson Burrill was born in 1810.

== Career ==
Burrill was elected as Sheriff of Los Angeles County, California to a one-year term in April 1850, shortly after California became a state. He was re-elected in 1851, after which he was elected and served as a justice of the peace.

Burrill, who liked to be called Thompson, "was particular in his dress, careful in his demeanor, clean shaven and wore a handlebar mustache." It is said he patrolled the city "armed with a navy Colt and an infantry dress sword."

Burrill was one of the signers of a letter to Peter Burnett, California's first governor under the new state constitution, asking what the duties of the newly elected county officials should be:

The undersigned would respectfully state that ... in the absence of any laws, it has been found impractical to organize the courts, or otherwise enter upon the discharge of their duties. ... We would respectfully ask Your Excellency for some suitable instructions ...

== Death ==
Burrill died in Los Angeles, California on February 2, 1856, at the age of forty-six.

== See also ==
- List of Los Angeles County sheriffs

Police appointments
Preceded by Office Established	Los Angeles County Sheriff; 1852-1855	Succeeded by James R. Barton
