= Edward McCarthy (police officer) =

Los Angeles police chief in 1885

Chief of Police of Los Angeles
- In office January 2, 1885 – May 12, 1885
- Preceded by: Thomas J. Cuddy
- Succeeded by: John Horner

Personal details
- Profession: Law enforcement

Edward McCarthy was the sixth Chief of Police of Los Angeles Police Department and had one of the shortest commands of any chief. He was forced out of office on May 12, 1885, after serving since January 2 of the same year.

During his short period in office, McCarthy commanded 15 officers in a department that had $354 worth of equipment and was paid $150 a month.

== See also ==
- List of Los Angeles Police Department Chiefs of Police

Police appointments
Preceded by Thomas J. Cuddy	Chief of LAPD; 1885	Succeeded by John Horner
