= Manuel Cota =

Manuel Cota may refer to:

- Manuel Alejandro Cota Cárdenas (born 1991), Mexican politician
- Manuel Humberto Cota Jiménez (born 1961), Mexican politician
- Manuel Cota Soto (1954–2016), Mexican professional wrestler
