= Tomás Ávila Sánchez =

American politician

Tomás Sánchez Ávila (c. 1826–1882) was a Californio soldier, sheriff and public official on the Los Angeles County Board of Supervisors and Los Angeles Common Council.

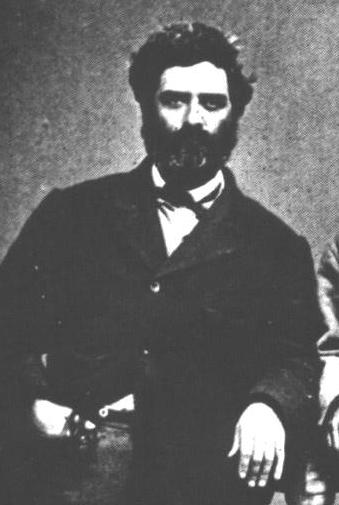
Sánchez Ávila

== Personal ==
Sanchez was baptized José Tomas Tadeo Sanchez y Avila as the son of Pedro Antonio Jose Sanchez (1806–1837) and Maria Ascension Josefa Avila (1809–1847). His grandfather, Vicente Anastacio Sanchez (1785–1846), was mayor of Los Angeles in 1831–1832 and 1845 and the grantee of Rancho La Cienega o Paso de la Tijera.

In 1867, Sanchez married Maria Sepulveda (daughter of Fernando Sepulveda and Maria Josefa Dominguez) and lived in an adobe home Casa Adobe De San Rafael on Rancho San Rafael.

He died at the age of 56 in 1882, leaving his wife, nineteen sons and two daughters.

== Political offices ==
=== Early ===
Sanchez was the tax collector for Los Angeles in 1843, during the period of Mexican government of California. He served as a soldier in the Mexican forces during the Mexican–American War, in which he was a lancer in the Battle of San Pasqual. Sanchez remained in the area after the war and remained active in politics under the new California government as a Democrat.

Los Angeles pioneer historian Harris Newmark recalled in his Sixty Years in Southern California that Sanchez was one of the "prominent Mexican politicians" who made "flowery stump speeches" to a group of "docile though illegal voters, most of whom were Indians," who had been literally corraled by backers of Thomas H. Workman who was running for county clerk and who swung them over to vote for the Democratic candidate instead of for Workman. "These were the methods then in vogue," Newmark wrote.

Sanchez's Los Angeles County biography states that in the 1850s Sanchez "was a staunch Democrat and strongly favored" the Confederacy.

=== Common Council ===
Sanchez was elected to a one-year term on the Los Angeles Common Council, the legislative branch of the city, on May 5, 1851, serving in the at-large post until May 4, 1852. It was the second election for municipal officers after the reorganization of the city following the Mexican War.

=== Board of Supervisors ===
During the insurrection of Juan Flores after the murder of Los Angeles County Sheriff James R. Barton in January 1857, Sanchez, who had a reputation for "physical courage and prowess" took the lead in the pursuit and capture of the Flores gang. His stand against the bandits gained him political support from the recently arrived American settlers that resulted in his election to the Los Angeles County Board of Supervisors in 1857, 1858 and 1859.

=== Sheriff ===
In 1860, Sanchez was elected the ninth sheriff of Los Angeles County since the county was organized in 1850; he was the first sheriff to have been born in the county. He became a founding member and lieutenant in the Los Angeles Mounted Rifles in March 1861. Sanchez, "the primary law enforcement agent in a lawless land," used his position as sheriff to help equip the company, but when Secessionist members of the organization absconded for Texas with the company's rifles in June 1861, he remained behind in office. Despite the suspicion of him by Federal officials during the American Civil War, he remained in office until 1867.

On December 9, 1863, Sanchez was taking a man who had been convicted of murder to the vessel Senator, lying off the Wilmington, California, harbor when a group of vigilantes seized the prisoner and lynched him, throwing his body overboard weighted with rocks they had brought with them. The result was a gunfight at the Bella Union Hotel in which two men were killed and a bystander was wounded.

== Property and legacy ==
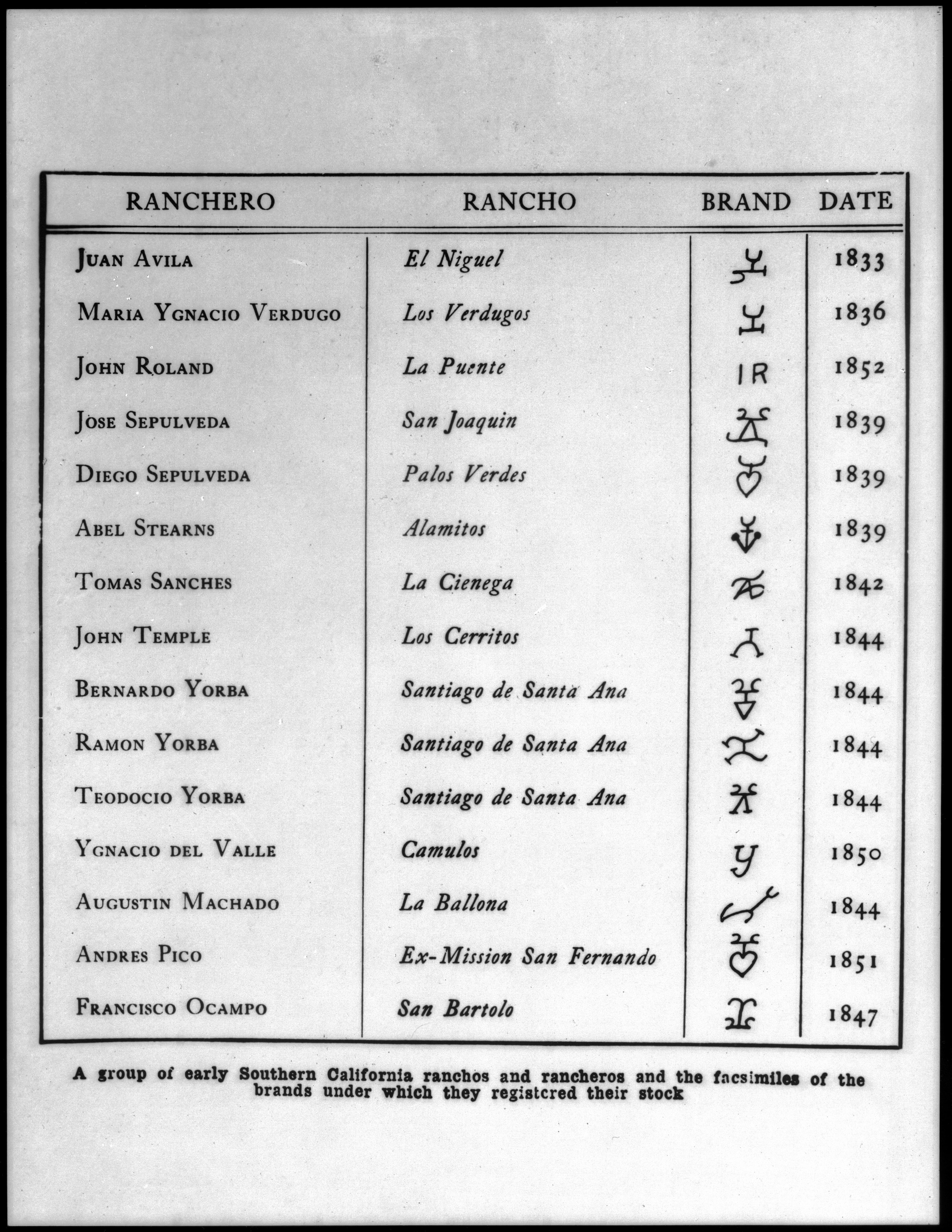
Cattle brands of the California ranches, including Tomas Sanchez of Rancho la Cienega

The Sanchez family is remembered in their adobe home in the western foothills of the Verdugo Mountains, a landmark now owned and maintained by the city of Glendale, California. After Tomas died in 1882, his wife, Maria Sepulveda, sold 100 acres, including the structure, to Andrew Glassel for $12,000, and then moved to the Los Angeles Plaza neighborhood. The City of Glendale bought the historic structure in 1932, giving it the address of 1330 Dorothy Drive.

Sanchez inherited Rancho La Cienega o Paso de la Tijera from his grandfather in 1846. After the death of Tomas, "a patent was granted his estate for four thousand or more acres" at Rancho Cienega y Paso de la Tijera. In 1970, the boundaries of the rancho were described in then-modern terms as "Exposition Blvd. to Slauson Ave. and from La Cienega east to 1st Ave., then a jog back to 4th Ave., midway between Slauson and Exposition. The land was mostly marshy meadows (ciénega is the Spanish word for marsh) and rolling hills and very fertile."

== References and notes ==
Police appointments
Preceded by James P. Thompson (Acting)	Los Angeles County Sheriff; 1860-1867	Succeeded by James F. Burns
