= List of Los Angeles County sheriffs =

Sheriff of Los Angeles County
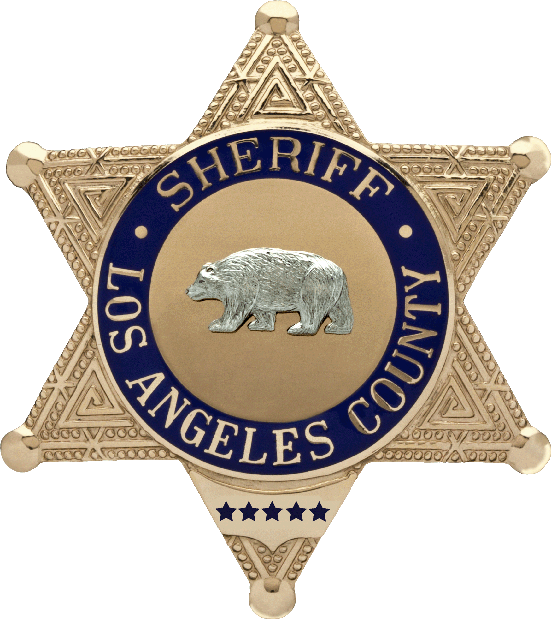
- Badge of the Los Angeles County Sheriff's Department

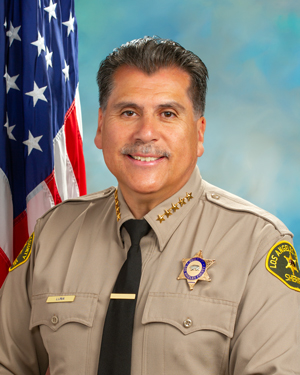
- Incumbent; Robert Luna since December 5, 2022
- Inaugural holder: George T. Burrill
- Formation: 1850

The following is a list of sheriffs who have served Los Angeles County, California:

List of Los Angeles County sheriffs
No.	Portrait	Officeholder	Tenure start	Tenure end
1		George T. Burrill	1852	1855
2		James R. Barton	1852	1855
3		David W. Alexander	1856	1856
4		Charles Egbert Hale	1856	1856
5		James R. Barton †	1856	1856
6		Elijah Bettis*	1857	1857
7		William C. Getman †	1858	1858
8		James P. Thompson*	1858	1859
9		Tomas Avila Sanchez	1860	1867
10		James F. Burns	1868	1871
11		William R. Rowland	1871	1875
12		David W. Alexander	1876	1877
13		Henry M. Mitchell	1878	1879
14		William R. Rowland	1880	1882
15		Alvan T. Currier	1883	1884
16		George E. Gard	1885	1886
17		James C. Kays	1887	1888
18		Martin G. Aguirre	1889	1890
19		E. D. Gibson	1890	1892
20		John C. Cline	1893	1894
21		John Burr	1895	1898
22		William A. Hammel	1899	1902
23		Will A. White	1903	1906
24		William A. Hammel	1907	1914
25		John C. Cline	1915	1921
26		William I. Traeger*	1921	1932
27		Eugene W. Biscailuz*	1932	1958
28		Peter J. Pitchess	1959	1982
29		Sherman Block*	1982	1998
30		Lee Baca	1998	2014
31		John Scott*	2014	2014
32		Jim McDonnell	2014	2018
33		Alex Villanueva	2018	2022
34		Robert Luna	2022	Incumbent

* Appointed to fill the unexpired term of the predecessor
† Killed in the line of duty

== See also ==
- Los Angeles County Sheriff's Department
