= John Horner (police officer) =

Los Angeles police chief in 1885

7th Chief of the Los Angeles Police Department
- In office May 13, 1885 – December 22, 1885
- Preceded by: Edward McCarthy
- Succeeded by: James W. Davis

Personal details
- Occupation: Police officer

John Horner was the seventh chief of police of the Los Angeles Police Department from May 13, 1885, to December 22, 1885.

== See also ==
- List of Los Angeles Police Department Chiefs of Police

Police appointments
Preceded by Edward McCarthy	Chief of LAPD; 1885	Succeeded by James W. Davis
