= Horace Bell =

American lawyer

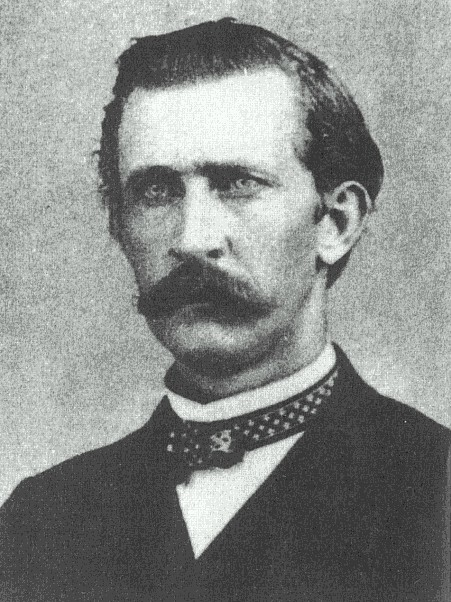
- Born: December 11, 1830; Indiana, U.S
- Died: June 29, 1918 (aged 87); Los Angeles, California, U.S
- Occupation(s): Writer, Soldier, Lawyer

Horace Bell (December 11, 1830 – June 29, 1918) was an American lawyer and writer. Primarily active in the state of California during the 19th century, he also served as a soldier in Mexico's Reform War (1857–1861)–where he served as a filibuster–as well as the American Civil War (serving in the Union Army) and a journalist, newspaper publisher, and Los Angeles Ranger during his later years.

== History ==
Horace Bell was born in Indiana on December 11, 1830. He was educated in Kentucky and then traveled to Hangtown (now Placerville, California) in August 1850 during the California Gold Rush. He spent two years mining with little success.

In 1852 Bell came to Los Angeles to visit an uncle, Alexander Bell, who had settled there in 1842 and had become a wealthy and politically influential. Horace Bell was a founding member of the Los Angeles Rangers, a militia company that pursued outlaws in what was then the most violent and lawless county in America. In 1856, he left California to join in the Walkers Filibuster into Nicaragua, becoming a major in Walker's army.

In 1859 he joined Benito Juárez's Army in Mexico during the Reform War. He returned to Indiana to join as a scout in the Union Army during the American Civil War.

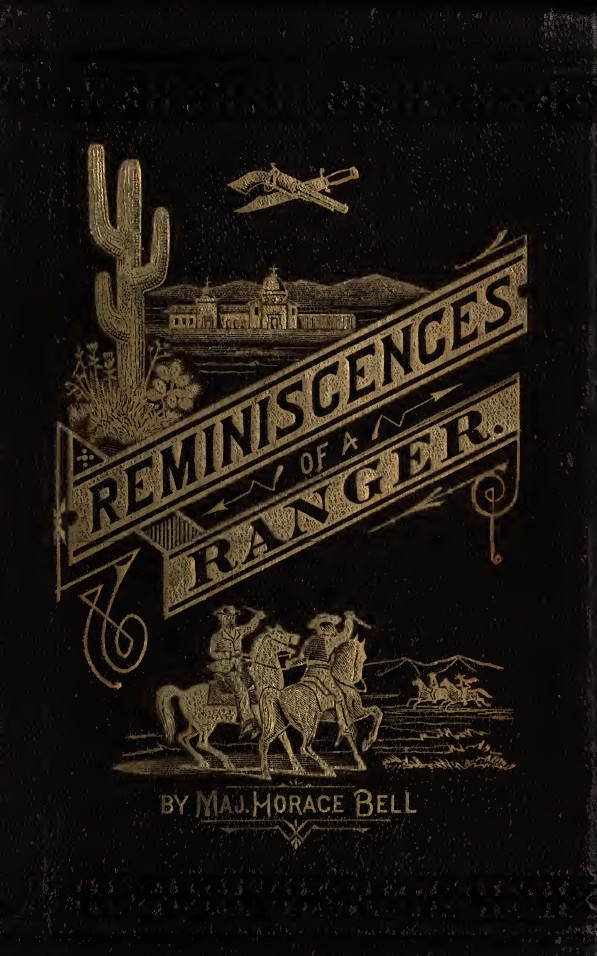
Reminiscences of a Ranger: Early Times in Southern California (1881)

In 1866, married with children, he returned to Los Angeles. He became a lawyer and journalist, and as an investor in city land he became prosperous. From 1882 to 1888 he owned and edited The Porcupine a newspaper he created to fight municipal corruption. As a lawyer and as an editor he defended the Californios and the poor.

In 1883, the Police Chief of Los Angeles attempted to shoot him, before he was overpowered by Bell's son Charlie. After his first wife died in 1899, he married a wealthy widow in 1909.

Horace Bell died on June 29, 1918. He was buried in Rosedale Cemetery in Los Angeles.

== Books ==
Horace Bell, was the author of two books about his life and the times of the early years of the State of California. The first was an 1881 memoir, Reminiscences of a Ranger: Early Times in Southern California. More of his memoirs were included in a posthumously published On the Old West Coast: Being Further Reminiscences of a Ranger (1930). Both volumes are educational about the 19th century American era of California and Los Angeles history.

== Legacy ==
The Bell Ranch, homesteaded by Horace Bell and his son Charlie in the 1880s, was in the Simi Hills and Rancho el Escorpión area of the western San Fernando Valley. Place names from that era include:

- Bell Creek — headwaters of the Los Angeles River, in Bell Canyon, West Hills, and Canoga Park.
- Bell Canyon, California — community in geographic Bell Canyon of the Simi Hills.
- Bell Canyon Park — along natural Bell Creek, in West Hills.
- Bell Canyon Road/Boulevard — following the creek from West Hills into Bell Canyon.

== See also ==
- History of Los Angeles, California
- History of the San Fernando Valley
- Leonis Adobe
- Rancho el Escorpión
