= Eugene W. Biscailuz =

American politician and police officer (1883-1969)

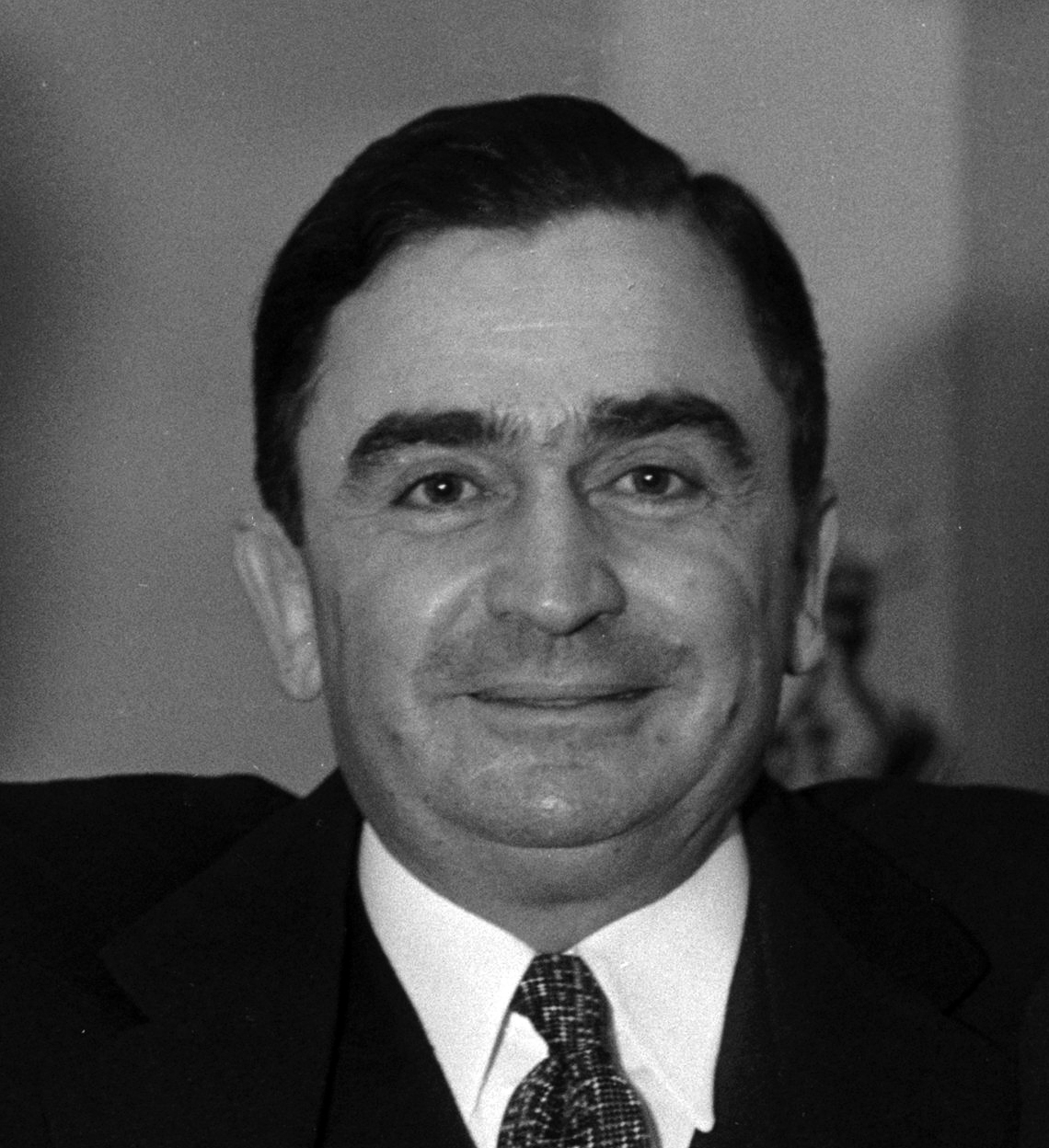
- Born: March 12, 1883; Boyle Heights, Los Angeles, California
- Died: May 16, 1969 (aged 86); Los Angeles, California
- Resting place: Woodlawn Cemetery
- Spouse: Willette Marce Harrison (m. 1902; died 1950)
- Police career
- Department: California Highway Patrol; Los Angeles County Sheriff's Department
- Service years: 1907–1958

Eugene W. Biscailuz (March 12, 1883 – May 16, 1969) was an American police officer. He organized the California Highway Patrol, and later became the 27th Sheriff of Los Angeles County, California, serving in that capacity for 26 years, from 1932 to 1958.

== Family and early life ==
Biscailuz was born in Boyle Heights on March 12, 1883. Sheriff Biscailuz's father, Martin V. Biscailuz, was an attorney of French-Basque descent. His mother, Ida Rose Warren, was a descendant of Spanish pioneer Jose Maria Claudio Lopez, a soldier at the San Gabriel Mission. Her father William Warren was an early Los Angeles city marshal killed in a gun battle in 1870.

Biscailuz attended St. Vincent's College (now called Loyola Marymount University), later earning a law degree from the University of Southern California.

In 1902, Biscailuz met and married Willette Harrison, whose father was a captain at San Quentin State Prison and later the sheriff of Marin County. The couple had two children, and stayed married until Willette's death in 1950.

== Career ==
After working briefly as a shipping clerk in Los Angeles and San Francisco, Biscailuz was appointed as a foreclosure clerk by Sheriff William A. Hammel in 1907. His law background helped him rise in the ranks until he was appointed undersheriff in 1921.

Biscailuz first came to public attention in 1923, when he was asked to accompany the District Attorney to Honduras to bring back convicted murderer Clara Phillips, who had escaped from the County Jail after her conviction. His wife accompanied him on the trip, and contracted a tropical infection from which she never fully recovered. Later, Biscailuz was involved in the 1927 manhunt for William Edward Hickman, the kidnapper and murderer of Marion Parker, and led raids that eventually helped bring an end to the gambling empire of Tony Cornero.

In 1929, Governor C.C. Young asked Biscailuz to reorganize the old State Motor Patrol. He was appointed the first Superintendent of the new California Highway Patrol (CHP), where Biscailuz organized the Highway Patrol system, then a new but separate law enforcement agency. Having finished his work for the CHP, in 1931 he resumed his post as undersheriff of Los Angeles County.

In 1932, after Sheriff William Traeger stepped down to run for Congress, the Board of Supervisors appointed Biscailuz Sheriff in 1932 with Traeger's endorsement and supported by thousands of signed petitions. He later ran unopposed for six terms. As sheriff, he pioneered a practice of putting well-behaved prisoners to work on "honor farms" in hopes of rehabilitating them.

After the 1933 Long Beach earthquake, Biscailuz was called upon to send fire fighting personnel and equipment, but needed more information about where to send them and what was needed. There were also rumors that the city had been struck by a tidal wave, and that Catalina Island had sunk 369 feet. Phone lines in the region had been knocked out, and the roads were nearly impassable because of debris and fallen power lines. Biscailuz asked a friend, C. N. (Jimmy) James, a pilot of Western Air Express, to fly an open cockpit plane over Long Beach to gather more information. James was able to determine that the rumors about Catalina and the tidal wave were not true, and that there were only two small fires burning in Long Beach. The entire flight took approximately 30 minutes. Biscailuz revamped the Sheriff Department's aero squadron to include private pilots flying their own planes to assist in aerial searches and rescues. This unit later evolved into the Sky Knight project of 1966, and is now the LASD Aero Bureau.

In a World War II interview, Biscailuz suggested that Mexican and Hispanic criminal activity in the city during wartime was a ploy by Japanese-Americans, who had by then been removed to concentration camps, as a form of sabotage, on the basis of race alone.

In 1957, Biscailuz served as technical advisor and appeared at the end of each of the 39 episodes of the syndicated television series "Code 3", which claimed to dramatize actual cases from his department.

Upon his retirement in 1958, the Board of Supervisors named him "sheriff emeritus for the rest of his life."

== Planning commission ==
He was a member of the city's first planning commission in 1920, which at that time was composed of 51 members appointed by the City Council "to work out an organized, comprehensive plan of city development." Other notable members were Charles A. Holland, C.J. Colden, Evan Lewis and W.H. Workman Jr.

Police appointments
Preceded by William I. Traeger	Los Angeles County Sheriff	Succeeded by Peter J. Pitchess
