= James R. Barton =

American sheriff (c. 1810–1857)

- Born: 1810; Howard County, Missouri, US
- Died: January 23, 1857 (aged 46–47); Los Angeles, California, US
- Occupations: Carpenter, sheriff

James R. Barton (1810? – January 23, 1857) was the second sheriff of Los Angeles County, California, and the first to die in office, in the line of duty.

== Biography ==
=== Early life ===
James R. Barton was born in 1810 in Howard County, Missouri. He emigrated to Mexico in 1841 and moved to Los Angeles, California in 1843. He served in the Mexican–American War of 1846–1848.

=== Career ===
A carpenter, he was the first treasurer of Masonic Lodge 42 in Los Angeles.

He was elected to four one-year terms as the Sheriff of Los Angeles County from September 1851 to October 1855. He was elected again in 1856.

=== Death ===
Barton and three of his deputies were killed near present-day Irvine, California in a shootout with bandits led by Juan Flores and Pancho Daniel on January 23, 1857. The site of the shooting is marked by California State Historical Landmark No. 218, Barton Mound, with this inscription:

Juan Flores, who had escaped from San Quentin, was being sought by James Barton with a posse of five men. Near this mound, Flores surprised Barton and three of his men; all four were killed. When Los Angeles learned of the slaughter, posses were formed, and Flores and his men were captured.

While the Flores Daniel Gang was being pursued, the bodies of the Sheriff and his posse were recovered by a special party sent out on horseback, escorting several wagons filled with coffins for the purpose and the bodies returned to the city. Harris Newmark described the reception of the bodies and the funeral:

when the remains were received in Los Angeles on Sunday about noon, the city at once went into mourning. All business was suspended, and the impressive burial ceremonies, conducted on Monday, were attended by the citizens en masse. Oddly enough, there was not a Protestant clergyman in town at the time; but the Masonic Order took the matter in hand and performed their rites over those who were Masons, and even paid their respects, with a portion of the ritual, to the non-Masonic dead.

The Flores Daniel Gang was hunted down and 52 gang members were arrested and 18 gang members were hanged for the murder of the four Lawmen. Juan Flores and the gang had taken refuge on the Flores Peak after killing James R. Barton and three of his Posse. Flores made a daring escape from encirclement by a Los Angeles posse led by General Andrés Pico. As part of the posse led by Tomas Avila Sanchez and Bethel Coopwood stormed up the mountain under fire, Flores rode his horse down the steep slope of the peak along with a two others of the gang, while three of the gang were captured there. Flores and another gang member were captured the next day by an El Monte posse led by Frank Gentry, but escaped again that night. However Flores was later captured in Simi Pass by a detachment of a company of Los Angeles men led by James Thompson, and U. S. soldiers from Fort Tejon.

== See also ==
- List of Los Angeles County sheriffs
- John Strother Griffin, took over de facto police defense of Los Angeles after Barton's death

Police appointments
Preceded by George T. Burrill	Los Angeles County Sheriff; 1852-1855; 1856-1856	Succeeded by David W. Alexander
Preceded by Charles Egbert Hale	Los Angeles County Sheriff; 1852-1855; 1856-1856	Succeeded by Elijah Bettis (Acting)
