= John Boessenecker =

American historian

John Boessenecker (né John Edward Boessenecker; born 27 February 1953) is an American historian and author, and a lawyer specializing in trust and estate litigation. He is based in San Francisco, California.

Fascinated by frontier history, he published his first article at the age of fifteen. After earning a history degree in college, he worked as a police officer for eight years before going to law school. He has published numerous articles about the American Old West. Since 1988 he has also published eleven books about the frontier West and the lawmen, vigilantes and outlaws of the period. His 2016 biography of Texas Ranger Frank Hamer made the New York Times bestseller list.

== Life ==
Boessenecker was born in San Francisco in 1953 and grew up in Mill Valley, California. He became interested in frontier history at an early age. At age fifteen, he sold his first article to a western magazine. He graduated from San Francisco State University with a B.A. degree in history in 1975.

He worked as a police officer in Mill Valley and San Mateo, California, from 1974 to 1982. He studied for a J.D. degree at University of California's Hastings College of the Law in San Francisco and was admitted to the California state bar in 1985.

== Career ==
Boessenecker has published dozens of articles on frontier crime and law enforcement in such publications as True West, Wild West, the Journal of Arizona History, and the Southern California Quarterly. He is the author of several nonfiction books.

In 2011 and 2013, True West magazine ranked Boessenecker as the Best Nonfiction Writer of the year. He received a prestigious Spur award from Western Writers of America and the Best Book award from Westerners International. His book Texas Ranger: The Epic Life of Frank Hamer was a New York Times best seller in 2016. Boessenecker has appeared frequently as a historical commentator on PBS, the History Channel, A&E, and other media.

== Books ==
- Badge and Buckshot: Lawlessness in Old California (1988)
- The Grey Fox: The True Story of Bill Miner, Last of the Old Time Bandits (1992)
- Lawman: The Life and Times of Harry Morse, 1835-1912 (1998)
- Against the Vigilantes: The Recollections of Dutch Charley Duane (1999)
- Gold Dust and Gunsmoke: Tales of Gold Rush Outlaws, Gunfighters, Lawmen, and Vigilantes (1999)
- Bandido: The Life and Times of Tiburcio Vasquez (2010)
- When Law Was in the Holster: The Frontier Life of Bob Paul (2012)
- Texas Ranger – The Epic Life of Frank Hamer, The Man Who Killed Bonnie and Clyde (2016). St. Martin's Press. LCCN 2015-48659; ISBN 978-1-4668-7986-7 (e-book); OCLC 1112255061 (all editions).
- Shotguns and Stagecoaches: The Brave Men Who Rode for Wells Fargo in the Wild West (2018)
- Ride the Devil's Herd: Wyatt Earp's Epic Battle Against the West's Biggest Outlaw Gang (2020)
- Wildcat: The Untold Story of Pearl Hart, the Wild West's Most Notorious Woman Bandit (2021)
