= William Workman =

William Workman, Will Workman, or Bill Workman may refer to:

- William Workman (baritone) (1940–2019), American opera singer
- William Workman (Canadian politician) (1807–1878), Canadian politician
- William ('Don Julian') Workman (1802–1876), American pioneer
- William H. Workman (1839–1918), American politician, mayor of Los Angeles
- Willy Workman (born 1990), American basketball player
- Bill Workman (1940–2019), American businessman and politician

== See also ==
- William Workman High School
