= Juan Temple =

American politician (1796–1866)

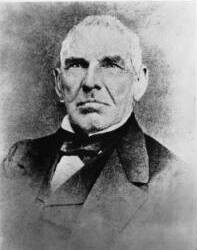
- Born: August 14, 1796; Reading, Massachusetts
- Died: May 31, 1866 (aged 69); San Francisco, California
- Spouse: Rafaela Cota

Don Juan Temple (né Jonathan Temple; August 14, 1796 – May 31, 1866) was a Californian ranchero and merchant. Born in Massachusetts, he emigrated to Alta California in 1827, becoming a Mexican citizen, adopting the Spanish language and a Spanish name, and eventually marrying into a prominent Californio family. After acquiring Rancho Los Cerritos in 1843, he became one of the largest landowners in Los Angeles County.

== Biography ==
Jonathan Temple was born in Reading, Massachusetts, to Jonathan Temple Sr. and Lucinda Pratt. From at least 1823, Temple was a merchant living in the Hawaiian Islands.

In 1827 he migrated to Pueblo de San Diego in Mexican Alta California. Temple was baptized a Roman Catholic, made a Mexican citizen, and began to go by the name Juan. In 1827 Temple moved north to Pueblo de Los Ángeles, where he opened the pueblo's first general store, a business he operated for almost thirty years. His younger brother. Francisco P. Temple joined him there later.

Juan Temple married Rafaela Cota (1812–1887) in 1830, and they had one daughter, Francisca Temple (1831–1893). In 1836, Temple hosted the first vigilance committee to form in California at his Los Ángeles residence. The committee later executed two lovers accused of the murder of the woman's husband, thereby committing the first lynching in California.

== Rancho Los Cerritos ==
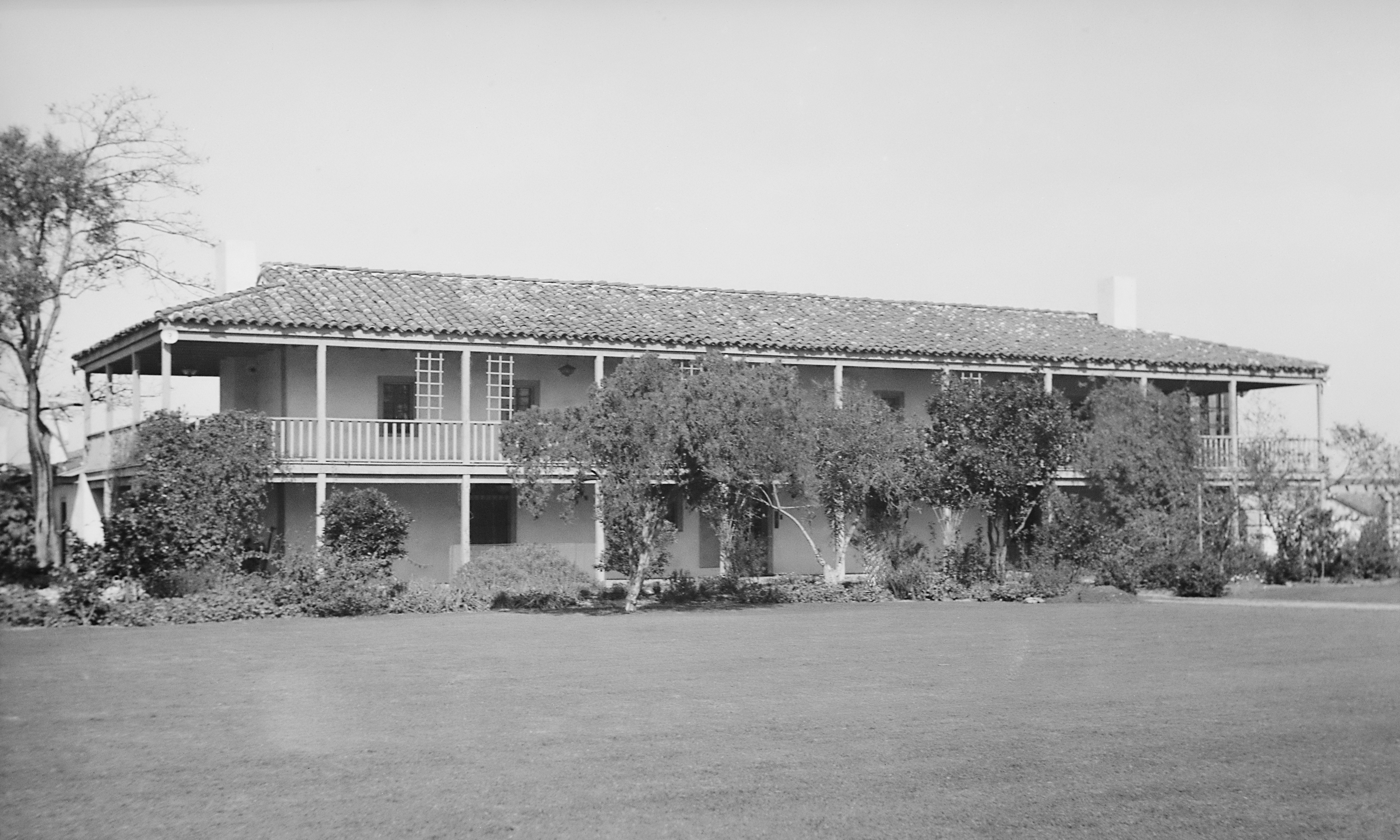
Los Cerritos Ranch House, after restoration. Photo by Daniel Cathcart, March 8th, 1934.

In 1843, he purchased Rancho Los Cerritos from his wife's relatives, the Cota family. His 1844 adobe survives as part of Los Cerritos Ranch House, a National Historic Landmark site. Both Temple and his ranch house played roles in the Mexican-American War. Temple created a thriving cattle ranch and prospered, becoming after Abel Stearns, the wealthiest man in post-statehood Los Angeles County.

During the 1840s, Temple was active in ship-bound trade throughout the coasts of Alta California and central Mexico, and owned extensive lands between Acapulco and Mazatlán. In 1856, by providing, through his son-in-law, Gregorio de Ajuria (1819–1861), the funds to finance the Plan of Ayutla removing Antonio López de Santa Anna as Mexico's president/dictator, he became the lessor of the Mexican national mint, a concession held by him and his daughter until 1893, when the mint was nationalized by Porfirio Díaz.

== Post-statehood ==
Temple was also one of Los Angeles’ first developers, constructing such landmarks as the original Temple Block and the Clocktower Courthouse, Market and Theater, which later served as city and county administrative headquarters, contained the county courthouse, and featured the first true theater in southern California. He also served as the first alcalde (or mayor) of Los Angeles after capture of the pueblo by the United States during the Mexican-American War and served on the first American-period common (city) council. In 1849, after Los Angeles was ordered by California's military governor to conduct a survey, but couldn't pay for the work, Temple paid for the Ord Survey out of his own funds, and then was repaid by the sale of lots created in the survey. Temple Street (Los Angeles) was developed by him as a modest one-block dirt lane in the 1850s.

The ill-fated timing of his construction projects in late 1850s Los Angeles, which was in an economic downturn, was exacerbated by a flood in 1861-62 and drought from 1862 to 1865 that almost destroyed the cattle industry, then the backbone of the local economy.

== San Francisco ==
Temple moved to San Francisco. Juan Temple lived his last years in San Francisco where he died in 1866, two months after selling Rancho Los Cerritos to Flint, Bixby & Co for $20,000, or less than a dollar an acre, during a prolonged depressed real estate market.

Rafaela Cota de Temple moved to Paris, France, to join her widowed daughter (Gregorio de Ajuria having died insane in Paris in 1861), and died there in 1887.

== See also ==
- Workman and Temple Family
  - Pliny Fisk Temple (Francisco P. Temple or F.P.T ) (February 13, 1822–April 27, 1880)
  - Josephine M. Workman–Mona Darkfeather (January 13, 1883–September 3, 1977)
- Boyle-Workman family
  - William H. Workman (January 1, 1839–February 21, 1918)
  - Boyle Workman (September 20, 1868–December 25, 1942)
- Workman and Temple Family Homestead Museum
  - El Campo Santo Cemetery
