= United States Army Volunteer Reserve Association =

American organization

The United States Army Volunteer Reserve Association is a volunteer organization unaffiliated with any military unit or reserve unit. The Los Angeles Times called it a "Phony Army unit" and referred to them as "faux military units". The group was once very visible in parades and civil ceremonies, but politicians and the Reserve Association now stays on a low key.

== History ==
The group officially formed in 2006, headquartering in Rosemead, California. Members could pay for various positions in the association, from $95 to become a sergeant to $335 for a lieutenant general.

== China ==
In 2010, a member claimed to be a Chinese-American general, leading to the red carpet treatment and press coverage. Once Chinese officials investigated, it was discovered he was a kung fu teacher in Temple City, California.

== Army/Military Special Forces Reserves ==
The U.S. Army/Military Special Forces Reserves group split off from the Reserve Association in 2008. It was operated by "Supreme Commander" Yupeng Deng and headquartered in Temple City, California, in what "looked much like a U.S. Army recruiting office." Deng gave legitimate-looking papers to recruits and told some the papers could help them get out of a traffic ticket and they would eligible for military benefits. Members were flashing fake military IDs at traffic stops, and a taxi driver was arrested after attempting to use his fake ID to get out of a ticket.

In April 2008, Yupeng Deng was arrested for 13 counts of theft by pretense, manufacturing deceptive government documents and counterfeiting a government seal. He was masquerading as a U.S. military reservist and preying on immigrants by promising that joining his group would give them an inroad to U.S. citizenship. Deng pleaded guilty in exchange for a three-year prison sentence. Paraphrasing the district attorney, the Los Angeles Times wrote "what made Deng's activities illegal was his taking money under false pretenses and promising recruits they would be fast-tracked to U.S. citizenship."
