= Roy Seldon Price =

American architect (1888–1940)

- Born: July 18, 1888
- Died: January 21, 1940 (aged 51)
- Occupation: Architect

Roy Seldon Price (1888-1940) was an American architect. He is best known for designing Spanish Revival buildings and houses in California, especially in Beverly Hills, California.

== Biography ==
=== Early life ===
Roy Sheldon Price was born on July 18, 1888. He moved from St. Louis, Missouri to Los Angeles, California in the early 1920s.

=== Career ===
In 1924, together with the architectural firm Gable & Wyatt, he designed the Heegard Writers and Artists Building, located at 9505 Santa Monica Boulevard in Beverly Hills, in the Spanish Revival architectural style. It was built for A.C. Heegaard and J.F. Hohn. In August 2014, it was added to the City of Beverly Hills Historical Landmarks.

In 1928, he designed a house for Lita Grey, Charlie Chaplin's first wife, in Beverly Hills, California, in the Spanish Revival style. The interiors were designed by Harold Grieve. It was then owned by actress Carole Lombard, and later by actress Patricia Barry.

He also designed the private residence of film director Thomas H. Ince in Beverly Hills. Additionally, he redesigned 'La Casa Nueva' for Walter P. Temple Sr., a member of the prominent Workman-Temple family. Another house he designed in Beverly Hills in 1926, built for Mrs. Chimorro, served as a speakeasy during Prohibition. It is now the home of jewelry designer Liv Ballard.

=== Death ===
He died on January 21, 1940.
