= Rancho Potrero de Felipe Lugo =

Mexican land grant in California

Coordinates: 34.060°N 118.020°W

Rancho Potrero de Felipe Lugo was a 2,043-acre (8.27 km^{2}) Mexican land grant in present day Los Angeles County, California, given in 1845 by Governor Pío Pico to Teodoro Romero and Jorge Morillo. The name means pasture of Felipe Lugo. Felipe Lugo was the son of Antonio Maria Lugo of Rancho San Antonio. The grant along the San Gabriel River encompassed present day South El Monte.

== History ==
Jorge Morrillo and his son-in-law Teodoro Romero received the Rancho Potrero de Felipe Lugo grant. Jorge Morrillo was married to Magdalena Vejar. Teodoro Romero was married Juana Maria Verdugo, daughter of Magdalena Vejar and her first marriage to José Joaquin Verdugo. Magdalena Vejar's brother, Ricardo Vejar, was granted Rancho San Jose in 1837.

With the cession of California to the United States following the Mexican-American War, the 1848 Treaty of Guadalupe Hidalgo provided that the land grants would be honored. As required by the Land Act of 1851, a claim for Rancho Potrero de Felipe Lugo was filed with the Public Land Commission in 1853, and the grant was patented to Jorge Morillo and Juana María Verdugo de Romero in 1871.

In 1874, F. P. F. Temple was the owner of Rancho Potrero de Felipe Lugo, and an undivided one-half of the adjacent Rancho La Merced. In 1876 the Temple and Workman Bank failed, and Temple, who had mortgaged Rancho Potrero de Felipe Lugo to Elias J. "Lucky" Baldwin, lost it when Baldwin foreclosed. Distraught and broke, William Workman shot himself in 1876. Temple suffered a stroke that left him partially paralyzed, and died penniless in 1880.

== See also ==
- Ranchos of California
- List of Ranchos of California
- Whittier Narrows
- List of rancho land grants in Los Angeles County, California
