= Juan Matías Sánchez =

- Born: 1808; Taos, New Mexico
- Died: 1885 (aged 76–77); Montebello, California
- Occupations: Rancher, banker
- Spouses: María Luisa Archuleta (m. 1872, died): Matilda Bojorquez
- Children: Tomás Luis Sánchez, Francisco Antonio Sánchez, María De La Luz Sánchez, Juan Cristobal Sánchez, Julián Librado Sánchez, Rosita Sánchez, Dolores Sánchez and José Juan Matías Sánchez
- Parent(s): Juan Cristoval Sánchez and María Margarita Silva

Juan Matías Sánchez (1808–1885) was a significant Californio landowner, rancher, and public official in 19th-century Southern California. He is best remembered as the co-owner of Rancho La Merced and the sole owner of Rancho Potrero Grande, as well as for his role as a Mayordomo at Mission San Gabriel.

== Biography ==
=== Early life and arrival in California ===
Sánchez was born in 1808 in New Mexico (then part of New Spain). He migrated to Alta California in the 1840s, arriving during a period of immense political transition as the region shifted from Mexican to American control following the Mexican-American War.

By the mid-1840s, Sánchez had established himself at Mission San Gabriel Arcángel, where he served as the mayordomo (superintendent). His administrative skills and reliability earned him the trust of both the local community and influential landowners like Hugo Reid and William Workman.

=== Land ownership and ranchos ===
Sánchez became a prominent figure in the San Gabriel Valley through the acquisition of vast tracts of land. His holdings were central to the agricultural and pastoral economy of the era.

==== Rancho Potrero Grande ====
In 1845, Governor Pío Pico granted the 4,431-acre Rancho Potrero Grande (Large Pasture) to Manuel Antonio Pérez, a Tongva native. Sánchez later acquired the title to this land. The rancho encompassed areas that are now part of Monterey Park, El Monte, and Rosemead.

==== Rancho La Merced ====
In 1850, Sánchez entered into a partnership with William Workman and Francis P. F. Temple of the Workman–Temple family. Together, they acquired Rancho La Merced. Sánchez lived in the Sánchez Adobe, which became the social heart of the ranch.

=== Financial collapse of 1875 ===
The 1870s brought a tragic turn to Sánchez's fortunes. In 1875, the Temple & Workman Bank in Los Angeles faced a massive liquidity crisis. In a desperate bid to save the bank, William Workman and F.P.F. Temple asked Sánchez to use his land as collateral for a loan from the wealthy (and ruthless) Elias J. "Lucky" Baldwin.

Out of a sense of loyalty to his friends, Sánchez signed the mortgage. When the bank ultimately failed, Baldwin foreclosed on the properties. Sánchez lost nearly all of his landholdings, including Rancho Potrero Grande and his interest in La Merced. Baldwin allowed Sánchez to keep his residence (the Adobe) and a small surrounding acreage for the remainder of his life.

=== Marriages and children ===
Sánchez was married to María Luisa Archuleta on February 11, 1872 at the Mission San Gabriel by Judge Ignacio Sepulveda. Archuleta was the widow of a gold miner named Rafael Martínez and was also a native of New Mexico. The couple had five children.

Upon Archuleta's death, Sánchez remarried to Matilda Bojorquez and the couple had three children.

=== Death ===
Sánchez died in 1885 at his adobe in Montebello, California. While he died in relatively humble circumstances compared to his peak wealth, he is honored as a pioneer of the valley whose generosity, though financially fatal, was a testament to the "compadrazgo" (kinship-like close-knit relationships) system of the Californio culture.

== Juan Matias Sánchez Adobe ==
The Juan Matías Sánchez Adobe, built around 1845, still stands today in Montebello, California. It is the city's oldest structure and serves as a museum. The site is a designated historical landmark, preserving the architecture and history of the Los Angeles region Rancho era.
