= Boyle–Workman family =

American family of pioneers

The Boyle–Workman family relates to the pioneer interconnected Boyle and Workman families that were prominent in: the history of colonial Pueblo de Los Angeles and American Los Angeles; the Los Angeles Basin and San Gabriel Valley regions; and Southern California from 1830 to 1930 in Mexican Alta California and the subsequent state of California.

== David Workman (pioneer) ==
David Workman (November 7, 1797 – July 1855) was born in Temple Sowerby, Westmorland, England, to Thomas Workman (1763–1843) and Lucy Cook (1771–1830). When he was fourteen years old, his father inherited a home and property in nearby Clifton from a childless uncle and aunt and the family relocated there. A few years later, his parents made cash bequests for their sons, with which David took one half of his allotment and left England for the United States in about 1817, settled eventually in Franklin, Missouri, where he opened a saddlery business. In 1822, he returned to the England, took the remainder of his bequest and convinced his younger brother William Workman (1799–1876) to join him in Missouri.

David ran a successful saddlery for many years, relocating to New Franklin when the original town was destroyed by flooding from the Missouri River and then to Boonville. One of David's apprentices at the saddlery in Old Franklin was Christopher "Kit" Carson, who 'ran away' to Nuevo Mexico in 1826 and became a famed scout, trapper, and explorer. David also made many trips buying and selling general merchandise to and from Mexico and other areas. In 1850, he made a trip to the California gold fields and two years later opened a store in Sacramento, California. After a fire destroyed it and seven-eighths of the town, David visited his brother, William, a successful cattle rancher at the Rancho La Puente, east of Los Angeles, and was convinced to relocate there.

In 1825, David Workman married Mary Hook of Virginia, but she died in childbirth along with their child. David then married Mary's sister, Nancy (May 13, 1807 – January 30, 1888). The two had three sons: Thomas H. (1832–1863), Elijah H. (1835–1906) and William H. (1839–1918). While David was gone on long extended trips for business, Nancy raised her sons in Missouri. Upon David's return to Missouri in early 1854, however, the family prepared for the migration to California, leaving Boonville in April and arriving in northern California in the late summer, followed by travel by steamer from San Francisco to Los Angeles, where they were met by William Workman in October.

David drove cattle and sheep to the gold mines for his brother and, on one of these trips in late June or early August 1855, he was killed in Stanislaus County, California, while seeking to retrieve a stray animal and falling down a steep cliff. His body was recovered by fellow Masons, who arranged for the shipment of his body to Stockton and then on to Los Angeles. In November 1855, David Workman was buried at his brother's private El Campo Santo Cemetery, now part of the Workman and Temple Family Homestead Museum in City of Industry, California, twenty miles east of Los Angeles.

David's widow, Nancy, and their sons, moved to Los Angeles. Thomas was killed in a steamer explosion in 1863, but Elijah and William went on to successful careers as saddlers, real estate speculators, and bankers. Both served on the Los Angeles City Council during the 1860s and 1870s. William H. Workman was Los Angeles' mayor in 1887–88, a parks commissioner in the 1890s, and treasurer from 1901 to 1907. A grandson through William, Boyle Workman, was on the city council from 1919 to 1927 and served as president of that body. He lost the 1929 mayoral campaign, but published, in 1935, a memoir, "The City That Grew" that is still read.

== Andrew A. Boyle ==
Andrew A. Boyle (September 29, 1818 – February 9, 1871), for whom Boyle Heights was named, was born in Ballinrobe, County Mayo, Ireland. After his mother died, his father migrated to America, but was never heard from again. Andrew and his siblings followed to the United States hoping to find their father, but were unable to do so. Andrew eventually joined the Irish colony of San Patricio in the department of Mexican Texas. During the Texas Revolution of 1836, his unit (Westover's artillery of the Texas Army) was destroyed by Mexican forces and the only survivor was Boyle, because his sister had done a favor for the Mexican military commander and begged for the preservation of her brother's life.

Boyle later moved to New Orleans, where he married Elizabeth Christie, the couple having one daughter, Maria Elizabeth (1847–1933). Boyle conducted business in Texas and Mexico and, returning home from one such trip, was on a ship that sank in the Gulf of Mexico. When it was reported that there were no survivors in the tragedy, Elizabeth Boyle took sick and died. Boyle left his daughter with relatives and, in 1851, migrated to Gold Rush-era San Francisco, where he ran a shoe store. He sent for young Maria and the two remained in the San Francisco Bay Area for a short while, before they moved down to Los Angeles in 1858.

He acquired the "Paredon Blanco" [White Bluffs] tract east of the Los Angeles River upon arrival and maintained the successful vineyard there, as well as running a shoe store in town. He built the first brick house in the area and maintained a comfortable existence. He died at age 53, in 1871.

Boyle was appointed to the Los Angeles Common Council, the governing body of the city, on September 2, 1867, and served until December 7, 1868. He was returned to the council in a special election on February 23, 1870, for a term ending December 9 of that year.

== Next generation ==
After Boyle's death in 1871, David Workman's son William H. Workman, who married Maria Elizabeth Boyle in October 1867, daughter of Andrew A. Boyle (September 29, 1818 – February 9, 1871). William H. Workman subdivided portions of "Paredon Blanco" and created the residential community of Boyle Heights in 1875 named after his wife. A financial downturn the following year prevented the neighborhood from growing until the famed Boom of the Eighties, which occurred during William H. Workman's term as Los Angeles mayor in 1886 and 1887. Boyle Heights was a fashionable residential area through the end of the 19th century, became a multi-ethnic enclave from the 1920s to the 1950s, and is a predominantly Latino community today.

William H. Workman and Maria Elizabeth Boyle Workman's son, Boyle Workman, was twice Mayor of Los Angeles, and wrote The City That Grew, a history of Los Angeles.

== See also ==
- Boyle–Workman family
  - William H. Workman (January 1, 1839 – February 21, 1918)
  - Boyle Workman (September 20, 1868 – December 25, 1942)
- Workman-Temple family
  - Pliny Fisk Temple (Francisco P. Temple or F.P.T.) (February 13, 1822 – April 27, 1880)
  - Josephine M. Workman – Mona Darkfeather (January 13, 1883 – September 3, 1977)
- Workman and Temple Family Homestead Museum
  - El Campo Santo Cemetery
  - Evergreen Cemetery, Los Angeles
