= Temple City, California =

City in California, United States

- City
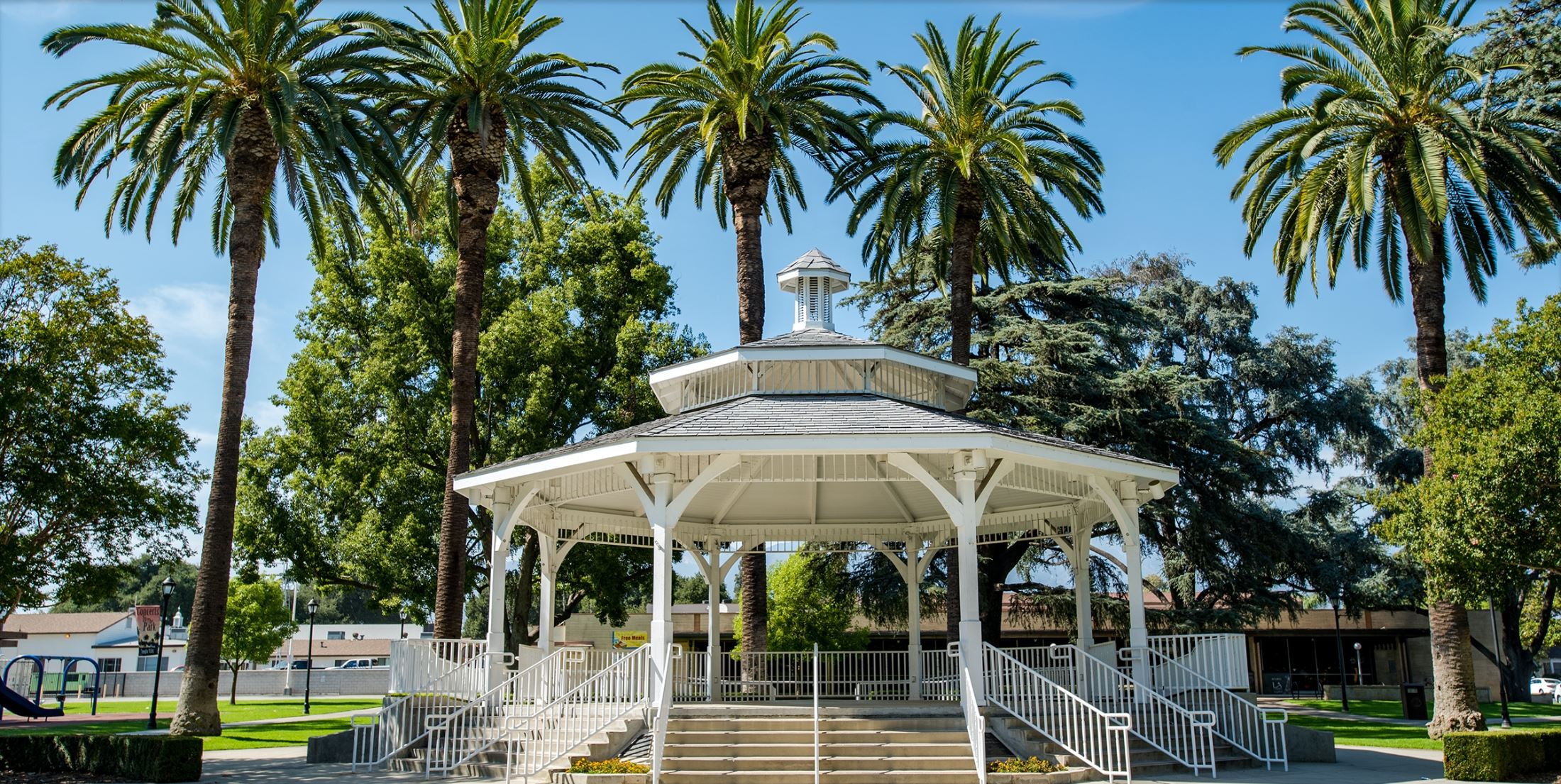
- Temple City Park

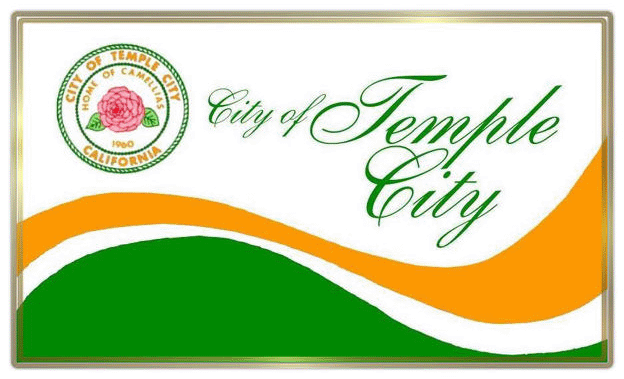
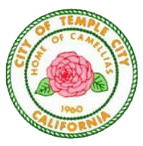
- Flag Seal
- Motto: "Home Of Camellias"
- Interactive map of Temple City, California
- Location in the United States
- Coordinates: 34°6′10″N 118°3′29″W
- Country: United States
- State: California
- County: Los Angeles
- Incorporated: May 25, 1960
- Named for: Walter P. Temple

Government
  - Mayor: Cynthia Sternquist
  - Mayor Pro Tempore: William Man
  - City Council: Ed Chen; Vincent Yu; Tom Chavez
  - City Manager: Bryan Cook

Area
  - Total: 4.00 sq mi (10.37 km^{2})
  - Land: 4.00 sq mi (10.37 km^{2})
  - Water: 0 sq mi (0.00 km^{2}) 0%
- Elevation: 400 ft (122 m)

Population (2020)
  - Total: 36,494
  - Density: 9,115/sq mi (3,519/km^{2})
- Time zone: UTC-8 (Pacific)
  - Summer (DST): UTC-7 (PDT)
- ZIP code: 91780
- Area code: 626
- FIPS code: 06-78148
- GNIS feature ID: 1656640
- Website: www.templecityca.gov

Temple City, California
- Traditional Chinese: 坦普爾市
- Simplified Chinese: 坦普尔市
Transcriptions
Standard Mandarin
- Hanyu Pinyin: Tǎnpǔ'ěr Shì
Yue: Cantonese
- Yale Romanization: Táanpóuyíh Síh

Alternative Chinese name
- Chinese: 天普市
Transcriptions
Standard Mandarin
- Hanyu Pinyin: Tiānpǔ Shì
Yue: Cantonese
- Yale Romanization: Tīnpóu Síh

Temple City is a city in Los Angeles County, California, United States, located northeast of downtown Los Angeles and at the base of the San Gabriel Mountains. Temple City is part of a cluster of cities, along with Pasadena, Arcadia, Alhambra, San Marino, and San Gabriel, in the western San Gabriel Valley.

As of the 2020 census, Temple City had a population of 36,494.

== History ==
The town of Temple originated on May 30, 1923, when Walter P. Temple (June 7, 1870 – November 13, 1938) purchased 400 acres (160 ha) of land four miles (6.4 km) east of San Gabriel which had been part of Lucky Baldwin's Rancho Santa Anita. The original townsite (Tract 6561, recorded with the LA County Tax Assessor in June 1923) corresponds to the present-day area bounded by Garibaldi Avenue on the north, Baldwin Avenue on the east, Live Oak Avenue on the south, and Encinita Avenue on the west.

Temple, the son and tenth child of Pliny Fisk Temple and William Workman's daughter Antonia Margarita Workman, was born on Rancho La Merced, which is today part of the city of Montebello. This was the site of the original San Gabriel Mission, founded by the Franciscan Fathers next to the rich bottom lands of the San Gabriel River. Historically called "Rio de los Temblores", which means the River of the Earthquakes, it is today known as the Rio Hondo.

Temple envisioned building a community where average people could afford to live and own their homes. He then divided the area into lots and laid out the park facing Las Tunas Drive. He named other streets after friends and family: Workman, Kauffman, Rowland, Temple and Agnes. Bond issues initiated by Temple were responsible for street paving and electricity. Temple also petitioned the Pacific Electric Railway Company to extend its Los Angeles to Alhambra line to a depot adjacent to Temple City Park. The extension of the railway contributed to the steady growth of Temple City, and is commemorated by statues of railcar passengers along Rosemead Boulevard.

=== City name ===
The town was originally named "City of Temple" after its founder, Walter Temple, but the United States Postmaster General Harry Stewart New demanded a name change in 1926 because the mail was accidentally being directed to the Phoenix suburb of Tempe. It was officially designated "Temple City" but remained a city in name only until after the post–World War II population explosion followed by incorporation on May 25, 1960, which resulted in the redundant name: "City of Temple City". (This redundancy is shared with other cities in California, such as the City of California City.) Merrill Fitzjohn, the founder and original owner of Fitzjohn Jewelers on Las Tunas Drive, was appointed as the city's first mayor.

=== 2009 Temple City Affair ===
In January 2009, the Los Angeles County District Attorney began investigating allegations that Temple City's mayor, Judy Wong, along with city council members David Capra, and former mayor Cathe Wilson solicited bribes in exchange for support of the proposed $75 million Temple City Piazza mall project and both women were charged with lying on fair political practice commission disclosure forms. Randy Wang, developer of the Piazza project, made allegations that Wong, Wilson and Councilman David Capra demanded and received cash bribes for their support of the development. Wang raised the allegations as part of his counter-suit against the city, which sued him in April 2008, claiming he failed to meet contractual deadlines of construction on the 4-acre (16,000 m^{2}) Piazza project. Temple City's lawsuit asks that the property, at Las Tunas Drive and Rosemead Boulevard, be returned to the city because of the delays after two groundbreaking ceremonies.

Wong, 55, the city's first Asian council member, was elected in 2003, was re-elected in 2007, and served as the city's first Asian mayor in 2007. Capra pleaded guilty to one misdemeanor count of failure to report a campaign contribution and agreed to resign as a condition for no prison time. Nine months after being indicted on charges of bribery and perjury, Wong resigned from office in March 2010; Wilson was voted out of office in spring 2009. In May 2010, Wong accepted a plea agreement of no contest for 10 counts of bribery and perjury. Wong served a 16-month sentence at Chowchilla after pleading no contest to 10 felony counts of bribery, solicitation of bribery and perjury, and she is required to pay $16,700 in restitution to developer Randy Wang. She will have to pay about $16,300 in fines and fees. The judge denied a request from Wong's attorney seeking probation for the one-time politician.

Cathe Wilson was charged with three counts each of perjury and bribery. The perjury charges included one count of lying to the Los Angeles County Grand Jury in 2008 and two counts of submitting false material in Fair Political Practices reports. Although she maintains her innocence, she chose not to plea, and her case was continued. On March 30, 2011, Wilson pleaded innocent to all charges. "Oh, yes, I've got to prove my innocence," Wilson, 78, said at the Clara Shortridge Foltz Criminal Justice Center when asked if she was going forward with the trial. "I wouldn't put my life savings ... if I didn't believe in my innocence. It's all a crock." In May 2011 she was convicted on six felony counts. She was sentenced on June 23, 2011, to four years in state prison and to pay more than $10,000 in restitution to the developer. She was released under an Alternative Custody Program in 2013.

Former candidate Scott Carwile, Wilson's protege, pleaded guilty to felony perjury and was granted probation in exchange for testifying against Wilson.

As of August 2014, all persons sentenced to imprisonment in the Temple City Affair have been released.

=== Attempts to block housing ===
In the aftermath of the passage of SB9, a California State housing law that permitted owners of single-family housing to subdivide their houses into duplexes, local officials in Temple City enacted new regulations that sought to disincentivize homeowners from creating duplexes. For example, the city required a 1,000-square-foot courtyard separating housing units, as well as other regulations. According to data reported to the state, there have been no applications for SB9 in Temple City.

California state housing officials have warned Temple City they are potentially in violation of state housing law. According to Temple City city manager Bryan Cook, the city is working in "good faith" with California state housing officials.

== Demographics ==
Historical population
Census	Pop.	Note	%±
1960	31,838		—
1970	31,034		−2.5%
1980	28,972		−6.6%
1990	31,100		7.3%
2000	33,377		7.3%
2010	35,558		6.5%
2020	36,494		2.6%
U.S. Decennial Census; 1860–1870 1880-1890; 1900 1910 1920; 1930 1940 1950; 1960 1970 1980; 1990 2000 2010; 2020

Temple City first appeared as a city in the 1960 U.S. census as part of the Southwest San Gabriel Valley census county division.

=== Racial and ethnic composition ===
Temple City, California – Racial and ethnic composition Note: the US Census treats Hispanic/Latino as an ethnic category. This table excludes Latinos from the racial categories and assigns them to a separate category. Hispanics/Latinos may be of any race.
Race / ethnicity (NH = Non-Hispanic)	Pop 1980	Pop 1990	Pop 2000	Pop 2010	Pop 2020	% 1980	% 1990	% 2000	% 2010	% 2020
White alone (NH)	23,408	18,957	12,589	8,095	4,896	80.80%	60.95%	37.72%	22.77%	13.42%
Black or African American alone (NH)	69	168	289	256	260	0.24%	0.54%	0.87%	0.72%	0.71%
Native American or Alaska Native alone (NH)	151	86	47	35	55	0.52%	0.28%	0.14%	0.10%	0.15%
Asian alone (NH)	1,561	5,991	12,894	19,682	23,187	5.39%	19.26%	38.63%	55.35%	63.54%
Native Hawaiian or Pacific Islander alone (NH)	1,561	5,991	8	25	13	5.39%	19.26%	0.02%	0.07%	0.04%
Other race alone (NH)	49	36	41	36	155	0.17%	0.12%	0.12%	0.10%	0.42%
Mixed race or Multiracial (NH)	x	x	673	576	821	x	x	2.02%	1.62%	2.25%
Hispanic or Latino (any race)	3,734	5,862	6,836	6,853	7,107	12.89%	18.85%	20.48%	19.27%	19.47%
Total	28,972	31,100	33,377	35,558	36,494	100.00%	100.00%	100.00%	100.00%	100.00%

=== 2020 census ===
As of the 2020 census, Temple City had a population of 36,494. The median age was 43.4 years. 19.0% of residents were under the age of 18 and 19.1% of residents were 65 years of age or older. For every 100 females there were 91.7 males, and for every 100 females age 18 and over there were 87.9 males age 18 and over.

100.0% of residents lived in urban areas, while 0.0% lived in rural areas.

There were 11,734 households in Temple City, of which 34.9% had children under the age of 18 living in them. Of all households, 56.0% were married-couple households, 13.9% were households with a male householder and no spouse or partner present, and 25.7% were households with a female householder and no spouse or partner present. About 16.5% of all households were made up of individuals and 8.1% had someone living alone who was 65 years of age or older.

There were 12,216 housing units, of which 3.9% were vacant. The homeowner vacancy rate was 0.5% and the rental vacancy rate was 3.6%.

== 2020 ==
The 2020 United States census reported that Temple City had a population of 36,494. The population density was 9,114.4 inhabitants per square mile (3,519.1/km^{2}). The racial makeup of Temple City was 17.1% White, 0.9% African American, 0.7% Native American, 63.9% Asian, 0.1% Pacific Islander, 8.9% from other races, and 8.5% from two or more races. Hispanic or Latino of any race were 19.5% of the population.

The census reported that 98.8% of the population lived in households, 0.4% lived in non-institutionalized group quarters, and 0.8% were institutionalized.

There were 11,734 households, out of which 34.9% included children under the age of 18, 56.0% were married-couple households, 4.4% were cohabiting couple households, 25.7% had a female householder with no partner present, and 13.9% had a male householder with no partner present. 16.4% of households were one person, and 8.1% were one person aged 65 or older. The average household size was 3.07. There were 9,237 families (78.7% of all households).

The age distribution was 19.0% under the age of 18, 8.6% aged 18 to 24, 24.5% aged 25 to 44, 28.8% aged 45 to 64, and 19.1% who were 65 years of age or older. The median age was 43.4 years. For every 100 females, there were 91.7 males.

There were 12,216 housing units at an average density of 3,050.9 units per square mile (1,178.0 units/km^{2}), of which 11,734 (96.1%) were occupied. Of these, 62.4% were owner-occupied, and 37.6% were occupied by renters.

In 2023, the US Census Bureau estimated that the median household income was $102,449, and the per capita income was $42,664. About 8.2% of families and 9.5% of the population were below the poverty line.

=== 2010 ===
The 2010 United States census reported that Temple City had a population of 35,558. The population density was 8,877.2 inhabitants per square mile (3,427.5/km^{2}). The racial makeup of Temple City was 11,941 (33.6%) White (22.8% Non-Hispanic White), 283 (0.8%) African American, 150 (0.4%) Native American, 19,803 (55.7%) Asian, 31 (0.1%) Pacific Islander, 2,316 (6.5%) from other races, and 1,034 (2.9%) from two or more races. Hispanic or Latino of any race were 6,853 persons (19.3%).

The census reported that 35,136 people (98.8% of the population) lived in households, 29 (0.1%) lived in non-institutionalized group quarters, and 393 (1.1%) were institutionalized.

There were 11,606 households, out of which 4,402 (37.9%) had children under the age of 18 living in them, 6,605 (56.9%) were opposite-sex married couples living together, 1,714 (14.8%) had a female householder with no husband present, 686 (5.9%) had a male householder with no wife present. There were 404 (3.5%) unmarried opposite-sex partnerships, and 65 (0.6%) same-sex married couples or partnerships. 1,973 households (17.0%) were made up of individuals, and 844 (7.3%) had someone living alone who was 65 years of age or older. The average household size was 3.03. There were 9,005 families (77.6% of all households); the average family size was 3.39.

The population was spread out, with 7,549 people (21.2%) under the age of 18, 2,887 people (8.1%) aged 18 to 24, 8,983 people (25.3%) aged 25 to 44, 10,778 people (30.3%) aged 45 to 64, and 5,361 people (15.1%) who were 65 years of age or older. The median age was 42.0 years. For every 100 females, there were 90.5 males. For every 100 females age 18 and over, there were 87.1 males.

There were 12,117 housing units at an average density of 3,025.1 units per square mile (1,168.0 units/km^{2}), of which 7,453 (64.2%) were owner-occupied, and 4,153 (35.8%) were occupied by renters. The homeowner vacancy rate was 0.7%; the rental vacancy rate was 5.2%. 23,213 people (65.3% of the population) lived in owner-occupied housing units and 11,923 people (33.5%) lived in rental housing units.

According to the 2010 United States census, Temple City had a median household income of $97,082, with 5.9% of the population living below the federal poverty line.

== Geography ==
According to the United States Census Bureau, the city has a total area of 4.0 square miles (10 km^{2}), all land.

== Government ==
=== Local Government ===
The City Council of Temple City has five members. They are each elected by citizens for four-year term and at-large instead of geographical district. The City Council elections are held during the California Primary election starting with the 2020 election. As a legislative body, it is the duty of the council to make the laws and establish policy. In March, the city council appoints one of its members to act as Mayor and one as Mayor Pro Tempore for a 1-year term. The Mayor presides over the council meetings and represents the city at civic functions. The Mayor Pro Tempore serves in the mayor's absence.

The current city council members are:

- Mayor: Cynthia Sternquist
- Mayor Pro Tem: William Man
- Council members: Tom Chavez, Vincent Yu, and Fernando Ed Chen.

=== List of mayors ===
This is a list of Temple City mayors by year.

- 1960 Merrill Fitzjohn
- 2007 Judy Wong.
- 2009
- 2011 Tom Chavez
- 2013 Cynthia Sternquist
- 2014 Carl Blum
- 2015 Tom Chavez
- 2017–2018 Cynthia Sternquist
- 2018–2019 William Man
- 2019–2020 Nanette Fish
- 2020–2021 Tom Chavez
- 2021–2022 Vincent Yu
- 2022–2023 Cynthia Sternquist
- 2023–2024 William Man

=== State and federal ===
In the California State Legislature, Temple City is in the 25th senatorial district, represented by Democrat Sasha Renée Pérez, and in the 49th Assembly district, represented by Democrat Mike Fong.

In the United States House of Representatives, Temple City is in California's 28th congressional district, represented by Democrat Judy Chu.

The Los Angeles County Department of Health Services operates the Monrovia Health Center in Monrovia, serving Temple City.

== Infrastructure ==
Fire protection in Temple City is provided by the Los Angeles County Fire Department. The Los Angeles County Sheriff's Department (LASD) operates the Temple Station in Temple City.

== Notable people ==
- Christine Abraham (b 1964) – mezzo-soprano and voice teacher
- Clyde Beck, (1900–1988) – was an infielder in Major League Baseball for the Chicago Cubs and Cincinnati Reds from 1926 to 1931.
- Richard Drew, (b 1946) is an Associated Press photo-journalist. who photographed The Falling Man.
- Frank Finch (1911–1992) – sportswriter for the Los Angeles Times.
- Hal Finney and Dorian Nakamoto, suspected identities of Satoshi Nakamoto.
- David Klein, (b 1946) is an inventor of the Jelly Belly brand. In 1976, he was living in Temple City when he came up with the idea for the new candy company.
- Steven Lindsey, (b 1960) – NASA astronaut who has flown five separate flights, including the last flight of the Space Shuttle Discovery from 1997 to 2009
- Xpecial, (b 1992) – is a well-known professional gamer in the North American League of Legends.

== Sister cities ==
Temple City currently has Sister City relations with the following places:

- City of Hawkesbury, Australia (Since 1984)
- Magdalena de Kino, Sonora, Mexico

== See also ==
- List of cities in Los Angeles County, California
