= Rancho Potrero Grande =

Mexican land grant in California

Coordinates: 34.060°N 118.070°W

Potrero Grande
- Land grant of Mexico
- 1845–1876
  - Type: Mexican land grant
- History
  - Established: 1845
  - Disestablished: 1876
- Today part of: The United States of America

Rancho Potrero Grande is a 4,432-acre (17.94 km^{2}) Mexican land grant in present-day Los Angeles County, California, granted by Governor Pío Pico to Manuel Antonio Pérez in 1845. The name means "Large Pasture". The grant encompassed present-day Rosemead and South El Monte.

== History ==
Manuel Antonio, an indigenous man, who was a mayordomo at the Mission San Gabriel was granted the one square league Rancho Potrero Grande - former Mission San Gabriel grazing land.

Juan Matías Sánchez bought Rancho Potrero Grande adjacent to his Rancho La Merced property from Manuel Antonio.

With the cession of California to the United States following the Mexican-American War, the 1848 Treaty of Guadalupe Hidalgo provided that the land grants would be honored. As required by the Land Act of 1851, a claim for Rancho Potrero Grande was filed with the Public Land Commission in 1852, and the grant was patented to Juan M. Sanchez in 1859.

In 1876 the Temple and Workman Bank failed, and Sanchez, who to help his friend William Workman, had mortgaged Rancho Potrero Grande to Elias J. "Lucky" Baldwin, lost it when Baldwin foreclosed. Distraught and broke, William Workman shot himself in 1876. Temple suffered a stroke that left him partially paralyzed, and died penniless in 1880. Juan Matias Sanchez died in poverty in 1885.
