= Rosemead, California =

City in California, United States

- City
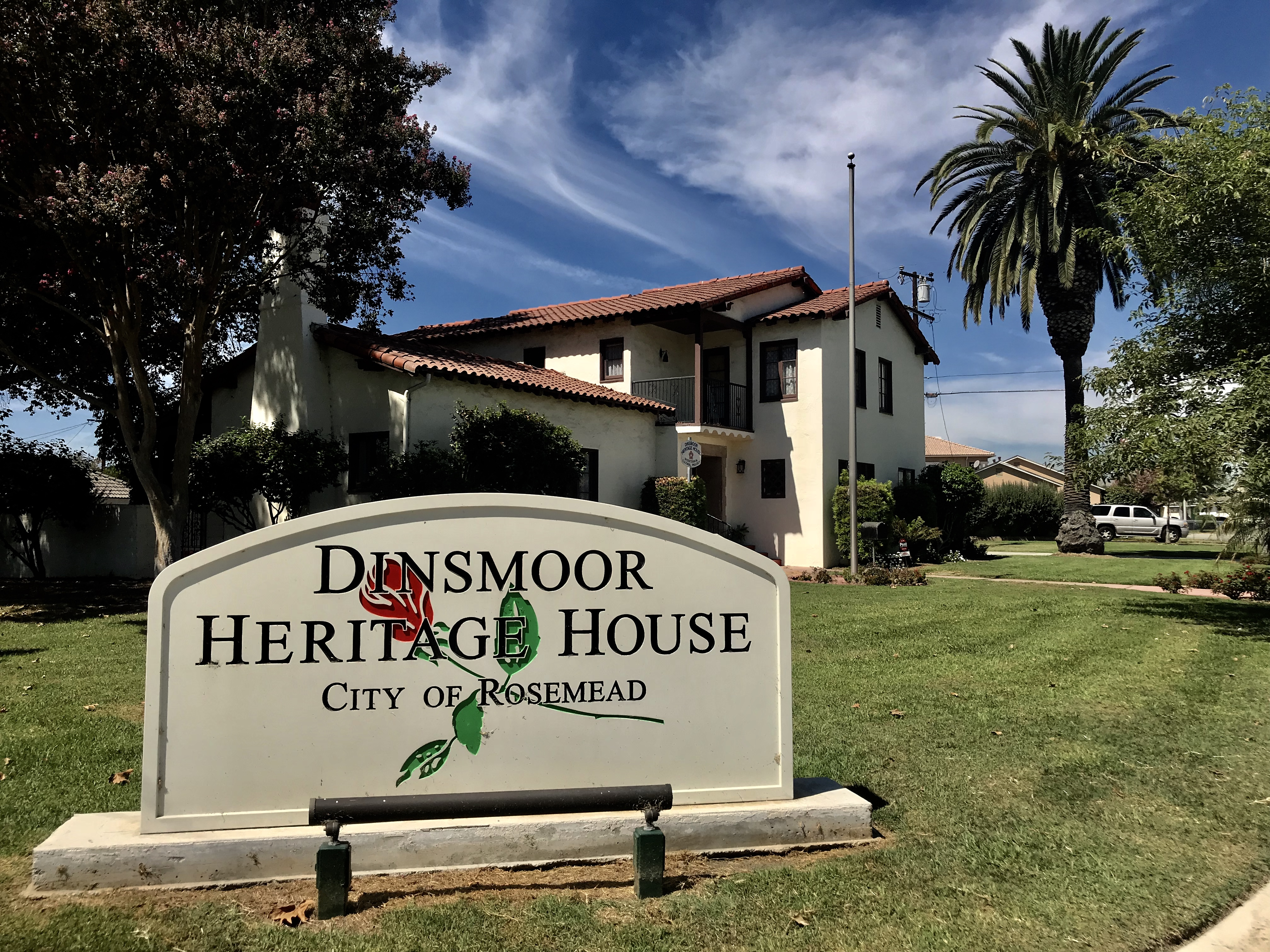

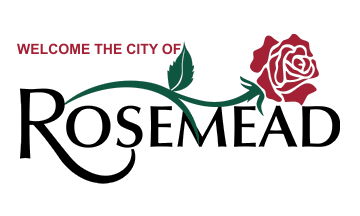
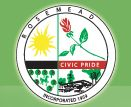
- Flag Seal

- Location of Rosemead in Los Angeles County, California

- Location of Rosemead in Los Angeles County, California Location of Rosemead in California Location of Rosemead in the USA
- Coordinates: 34°4′N 118°5′W
- Country: United States
- State: California
- County: Los Angeles
- Incorporated: August 4, 1959

Government
  - Type: Council-Manager
  - Mayor: Margaret Hayes Clark
  - City Manager: Ben Kim

Area
  - Total: 5.17 sq mi (13.40 km^{2})
  - Land: 5.16 sq mi (13.37 km^{2})
  - Water: 0.015 sq mi (0.04 km^{2}) 0.26%
- Elevation: 318 ft (97 m)

Population (2020)
  - Total: 51,185
  - Density: 10,472.4/sq mi (4,043.41/km^{2})
- Time zone: UTC−8 (PST)
  - Summer (DST): UTC−7 (PDT)
- ZIP Codes: 91770–91772
- Area code: 323/626
- FIPS code: 06-62896
- GNIS feature IDs: 1656611, 2410998
- Website: www.rosemeadca.gov

Rosemead is a city in Los Angeles County, California, United States. The 2020 United States census reported a population of 51,185. Rosemead is part of a cluster of cities, along with Alhambra, Arcadia, Temple City, Monterey Park, San Marino, and San Gabriel, in the west San Gabriel Valley with a growing Asian-American population.

== History ==
Prior to the arrival of the Spanish, the area around Rosemead was populated by Native Americans known as the people of the willow houses or better known as the Kizh (pronounced Keech), alternatively Tongva or as the Spaniards renamed them, the Gabrieleños. In 1771, the Spanish founded the first Mission San Gabriel Arcángel in the area that was formally known as the village of Shevaangna or Siba what is [first Angeleno William McCawley 1996] now known as La Misión Vieja or Whittier Narrows on the border between Montebello and Rosemead. In 1775, the mission moved to avoid the spring floods that ruined the first crops, to its present location in San Gabriel formally known as the village of Tovisvanga .

During the Spanish Colonial era, the area that is now the City of Rosemead was part of the land administered by the San Gabriel Mission. As part of the Mexican government's Secularization Act of 1833, the land, formerly held by the Mission, was distributed to private citizens, requiring only that they build a house and graze cattle, bringing to an end the Mission Era Following the Mexican–American War and the 1848 signing of the Treaty of Guadalupe which transferred sovereignty over the territory now known as the State of California to the United States, Anglo-American immigration began to flow to the area. Most of present-day Rosemead was part of Rancho Potrero Grande (Large Pasture) which was originally granted to a Native American man named Manuel Antonio Pérez in 1845, who was a "mayordomo" (overseer) at the San Gabriel Mission. By 1852, the 4,431-acre (18 km^{2}) ranch was later transferred to Juan Matías Sánchez, a native of Taos, New Mexico.

In 1852, John and Harriet Guess moved cross-country in an ox drawn wagon, to the San Gabriel Valley from Conway County, Arkansas. In 1855, the couple camped where present-day Savannah Elementary School is located on Rio Hondo Avenue. They claimed to be renting the land, but it was later determined by the courts in 1867 that they were illegally squatting on Juan Matías Sánchez's land. Later, John Guess purchased 100 acres (0.4 km^{2}) of a 1,164-acre (5 km^{2}) ranch and named it Savannah. The land stretched from Valley Boulevard to Marshall Street, and from Rosemead Boulevard to the Eaton Wash.

Other pioneers, Frank Forst and Leonard John Rose, also settled in this valley. Rose and his wife Amanda bought about 600 acres (2.4 km^{2}) of land between what is now Rosemead Boulevard and Walnut Grove Avenue. Rose bred and trained horses for a living. He named his ranch "Rose's Meadow" which was eventually shortened to Rosemeade and gave the city its name. Rosemeade was once again shortened to Rosemead. The peaceful, pastoral community flourished with small truck farms and rabbit and chicken farms. Settlers moved in and also raised vegetables, fruits, grain and feed for the animals. It wasn't until August 4, 1959, the citizens elected to incorporate Rosemead into a city.

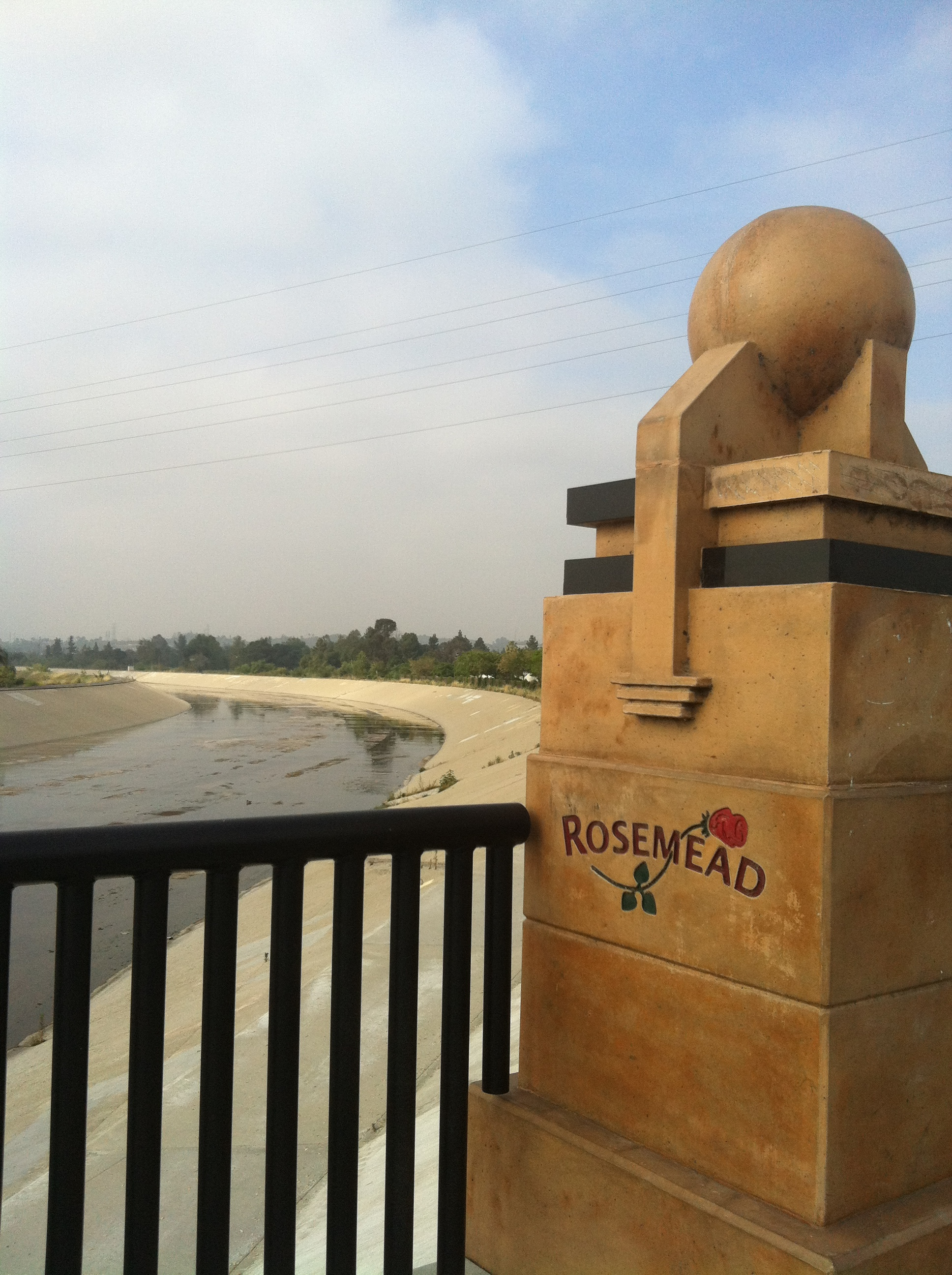
Entrance to Rosemead on Garvey Avenue over Rio Hondo Bridge

=== Rosemead Airport ===
Western Air College operated the airport. Fletcher Aviation acquired the airport from the Heasley brothers during the Korean War.

== Demographics ==
Rosemead is part of a cluster of cities (along with Arcadia, Temple City, Monterey Park, San Marino, and San Gabriel) in the west San Gabriel Valley with a growing Asian population. Rosemead has a significant population from Mexico, among other Latino nationalities. Less than 1% of the population is African-American or Native American.

Historical population
Census	Pop.	Note	%±
1960	15,476		—
1970	40,972		164.7%
1980	42,604		4.0%
1990	51,638		21.2%
2000	53,505		3.6%
2010	53,764		0.5%
2020	51,185		−4.8%
U.S. Decennial Census; 1860–1870 1880-1890; 1900 1910 1920; 1930 1940 1950; 1960 1970 1980; 1990 2000 2010; 2020

Rosemead was first listed in the 1960 U.S. census as part of the Southwest San Gabriel Valley census community division.

=== Racial and ethnic composition ===
Rosemead city, California – Racial and ethnic composition Note: the US Census treats Hispanic/Latino as an ethnic category. This table excludes Latinos from the racial categories and assigns them to a separate category. Hispanics/Latinos may be of any race.
Race / Ethnicity (NH = Non-Hispanic)	Pop 1980	Pop 1990	Pop 2000	Pop 2010	Pop 2020	% 1980	% 1990	% 2000	% 2010	% 2020
White alone (NH)	14,089	8,197	4,295	2,549	1,664	33.07%	15.87%	8.03%	4.74%	3.25%
Black or African American alone (NH)	48	265	262	176	221	0.11%	0.51%	0.49%	0.33%	0.43%
Native American or Alaska Native alone (NH)	132	108	112	56	42	0.31%	0.21%	0.21%	0.10%	0.08%
Asian alone (NH)	3,767	17,316	25,970	32,439	32,758	8.84%	33.53%	48.54%	60.34%	64.00%
Native Hawaiian or Pacific Islander alone (NH)	3,767	17,316	18	14	20	8.84%	33.53%	0.03%	0.03%	0.04%
Other race alone (NH)	160	111	26	26	130	0.38%	0.21%	0.05%	0.05%	0.25%
Mixed race or Multiracial (NH)	x	x	725	357	444	x	x	1.36%	0.66%	0.87%
Hispanic or Latino (any race)	24,408	25,641	22,097	18,147	15,906	57.29%	49.66%	41.30%	33.75%	31.08%
Total	42,604	51,638	53,505	53,764	51,185	100.00%	100.00%	100.00%	100.00%	100.00%

=== 2020 census ===
As of the 2020 census, Rosemead had a population of 51,185 and a population density of 9,915.7 inhabitants per square mile (3,828.5/km^{2}). The racial makeup of the city was 7.7% White, 0.6% African American, 1.1% Native American, 64.4% Asian, 0.0% Pacific Islander, 17.3% from other races, and 8.9% from two or more races. Hispanic or Latino residents of any race were 31.1% of the population.

The census reported that 99.0% of the population lived in households, 0.5% lived in non-institutionalized group quarters, and 0.5% were institutionalized. 100.0% of residents lived in urban areas, while 0.0% lived in rural areas.

There were 14,459 households, of which 35.9% had children under the age of 18 living in them. Of all households, 50.4% were married-couple households, 5.0% were cohabiting couple households, 17.8% were households with a male householder and no spouse or partner present, and 26.8% were households with a female householder and no spouse or partner present. About 12.8% of all households were made up of individuals and 6.5% had someone living alone who was 65 years of age or older. The average household size was 3.51, and there were 11,821 families (81.8% of all households).

The age distribution was 18.0% under the age of 18, 9.5% aged 18 to 24, 25.4% aged 25 to 44, 29.1% aged 45 to 64, and 18.0% who were 65 years of age or older. The median age was 42.5 years. For every 100 females, there were 95.7 males, and for every 100 females age 18 and over there were 93.2 males age 18 and over.

There were 14,889 housing units at an average density of 2,884.3 units per square mile (1,113.6 units/km^{2}), of which 14,459 (97.1%) were occupied. Of occupied units, 47.0% were owner-occupied and 53.0% were occupied by renters. The overall vacancy rate was 2.9%, with a homeowner vacancy rate of 0.1% and a rental vacancy rate of 2.2%.

=== Recent estimates ===
In 2024, the US Census Bureau estimated that the median household income was $73,566, and the per capita income was $28,363. About 13.7% of the population were below the poverty line.

=== 2010 census ===
The 2010 United States census reported that Rosemead had a population of 53,764. The population density was 10,387 inhabitants per square mile (4,010/km^{2}). The racial makeup of Rosemead was 11,348 (21.1%) White (4.7% Non-Hispanic White), 273 (0.5%) African American, 396 (0.7%) Native American, 32,617 (60.7%) Asian, 32 (0.1%) Pacific Islander, 7,940 (14.8%) from other races, and 1,158 (2.2%) from two or more races. Hispanic or Latino of any race were 18,147 persons (33.8%).

The Census reported that 53,351 people (99.2% of the population) lived in households, 135 (0.3%) lived in non-institutionalized group quarters, and 278 (0.5%) were institutionalized.

There were 14,247 households, out of which 6,267 (44.0%) had children under the age of 18 living in them, 8,028 (56.3%) were opposite-sex married couples living together, 2,502 (17.6%) had a female householder with no husband present, 1,373 (9.6%) had a male householder with no wife present. There were 571 (4.0%) unmarried opposite-sex partnerships, and 74 (0.5%) same-sex married couples or partnerships. 1,739 households (12.2%) were made up of individuals, and 844 (5.9%) had someone living alone who was 65 years of age or older. The average household size was 3.74. There were 11,903 families (83.5% of all households); the average family size was 3.99.

The population was spread out, with 12,231 people (22.7%) under the age of 18, 5,225 people (9.7%) aged 18 to 24, 14,952 people (27.8%) aged 25 to 44, 14,392 people (26.8%) aged 45 to 64, and 6,964 people (13.0%) who were 65 years of age or older. The median age was 38.1 years. For every 100 females, there were 97.3 males. For every 100 females age 18 and over, there were 94.9 males.

There were 14,805 housing units at an average density of 2,860 per square mile (1,100/km^{2}), of which 6,972 (48.9%) were owner-occupied, and 7,275 (51.1%) were occupied by renters. The homeowner vacancy rate was 0.9%; the rental vacancy rate was 3.2%. 26,324 people (49.0% of the population) lived in owner-occupied housing units and 27,027 people (50.3%) lived in rental housing units.

According to the 2010 United States census, Rosemead had a median household income of $45,760, with 18.8% of the population living below the federal poverty line.

=== Ancestry ===
Mapping L.A. reported that in 2000, Mexican and Chinese were the most common ancestries. Vietnam and Mexico were the most common foreign places of birth.

== Emergency services ==
Fire protection in Rosemead is provided by the Los Angeles County Fire Department with ambulance transport by American Medical Response. The Los Angeles County Sheriff's Department provides law enforcement, operating out of the Temple City Station.

== Economy ==
Edison International, the international family of companies providing electric services, is headquartered in the city. Southern California Edison serves Rosemead, as well as much of Southern California. The University of the West moved from its location from Hsi Lai Temple in Hacienda Heights to its current location in Rosemead in 1996 and is one of the first Buddhist funded universities in the United States. The Rosemead School of Psychology, which is now located with Biola University in La Mirada, was named after its original location in Rosemead and was the first independent professional school of psychology in the nation to be accredited by regional accrediting association. The Chinese cuisine fast food chain Panda Restaurant Group is headquartered in Rosemead. The Chinese-Vietnamese Sriracha red chili sauce (known to many as Rooster sauce) manufacturer Huy Fong Foods, Inc. (滙豐食品公司) is also based in the city. The sauce is now being made at Huy Fong's plant in neighboring Irwindale.

=== Top employers ===
According to the city's 2023 Annual Comprehensive Financial Report, the top employers in the city are:

#	Employer	# of Employees
1	Edison International (Southern California Edison)	2,722
2	Garvey School District	881
3	Panda Restaurant Group	647
4	Wal-Mart	597
5	Rosemead School District	329
6	Target	200
7	Hermetic Seal	120
8	Lucille's	100
8	DoubleTree	100
8	University of the West	100

== Government ==
=== Local government ===
Elections for the four year terms are held every two years in the odd-numbered years. The Council elects from its membership a Mayor to serve as its presiding officer for a one-year term.

City Council 2023:

- Mayor Sean Dang (Current term ends 2024)
- Mayor Pro Tem Steven Ly (Current term ends 2026)
- Council Member Sandra Armenta (Current term ends 2026)
- Council Member Margaret Clark (Current term ends 2026)
- Council Member Polly Low (Current term ends 2024)

Administration:

- Ben Kim, City Manager
- Ericka Hernandez, City Clerk
- Thomas Boecking, Director of Parks and Recreation

=== Federal and state representation ===
Before December 2012, Rosemead was located in California's 32nd congressional district, which had a Cook Partisan Voting Index of D +17. Currently, Rosemead is in California's 28th congressional district, represented by Democrat Judy Chu.

In the California State Legislature, Rosemead is in the 25th senatorial district, represented by Democrat Sasha Renée Pérez, and in the 49th Assembly district, represented by Democrat Mike Fong.

== Geography ==
Rosemead is located at 34°4′N 118°5′W (34.070, -118.082).

According to the United States Census Bureau, the city has a total area of 5.2 square miles (13 km^{2}), of which 5.2 square miles (13 km^{2}) is land and 0.19% is water.

The city is bordered to the north by San Gabriel and Temple City, to the east by El Monte, and South El Monte, to the south by the unincorporated area of South San Gabriel and Montebello and to the west by San Gabriel and Monterey Park.

== Infrastructure ==
The Los Angeles County Sheriff's Department (LASD) operates the Temple Station in Temple City, serving Rosemead.

The Los Angeles County Department of Health Services operates the El Monte Comprehensive Health Center in El Monte, serving Rosemead.

== Education ==
Rosemead is served by two elementary school districts: Garvey School District and Rosemead School District. Each of these districts overlaps with a high school district; the former overlaps with the Alhambra Unified School District and the latter overlaps with a portion of the El Monte Union High School District. A small piece of Rosemead to north extends into the San Gabriel Unified School District. A piece of Rosemead to the south extends into the Montebello Unified School District.

There is one public high school--Rosemead High School (of El Monte UHS)—in the city and three public middle schools: Muscatel Middle School, Richard Garvey Intermediate School and Roger W. Temple Intermediate School. The portion in Garvey SD with Alhambra USD high school zoning is zoned to San Gabriel High School.

Don Bosco Technical Institute, a private Catholic high school for boys.

University of the West has been located in Rosemead since 1996. UWest is Rosemead's only Western Association of Schools and Colleges accredited campus.

== Places of interest ==
The Dinsmoor Heritage House is a bijou museum that houses, preserves and displays a showcase of the colorful and rich history of the City of Rosemead. Once a private home, it was built in the late 1920s by Adelberrt Dinsmoor, son of one of Rosemead's pioneers, Raphael Dinsmoor. Currently closed to undergoing refurbishing, it will again conduct monthly tours and host a variety of special events when completed. It is located at 9642 Steele Street.

The Marinelli Stadium, named in memory of Rod Marinelli, formerly the head coach of the Detroit Lions, is located at Rosemead High School. "Rod Marinelli Stadium" appears in lights above the scoreboard and an encrypted bronze marker is placed at the southern edge of the field on a large stone.

There are two community centers in Rosemead that offer multi-purpose facilities for a large variety of occasions as well as senior activities, adult education programs, youth and adult classes, as well as two preschools.

The city has completed a complete renovation, from the ground up, at both city aquatic centers. Rosemead Aquatic Center, located in Rosemead Park, features swim, water polo and diving facilities as well as swim classes and recreation areas. Garvey Aquatic Center is now a state of the art recreational aquatic facility featuring water slides, interactive play areas and a lesson pool. Showers at both pools have been updated for resource efficiency. The city completed these plans on schedule for the summer of 2011. Garvey Aquatic Center was funded entirely through a grant from the State of California. Rosemead Aquatic Center was funded by bond proceeds.

=== City parks ===
- Garvey Park, located at 7933 Emerson Place.
- Rosemead Park and 1/2-Mile Fitness Trail located at 4343 Encinita Avenue.
- Klingerman Park, located at 8800 Klingerman Avenue.
- Sally Tanner Park, at 8343 E Mission Drive.
- Zapopan Park, at 3018 N. Charlotte Avenue.
- Jay Imperial Park, located at 2373 Pine Street.

=== Savannah Pioneer Cemetery ===
Before the Civil War, many Southern families settled in El Monte, then called Lexington. The community of Rosemead, then called Savannah, is located adjacent to El Monte and is situated above the water table. The slightly elevated land made it the logical alternative as the burial site for residents of swampy Lexington. The first known burial was in 1846, five years before most of the settlers arrived. Today the 41/2 acre cemetery, with 200 plots remaining of its original 3,000, is privately owned by the El Monte Cemetery Association. When the City of Rosemead started to widen Valley Boulevard in the 1920s, construction crews unearthed dozens of corpses outside the fence of the cemetery. The majority of the skeletons were reburied in a mass grave inside the cemetery proper, but some were so deteriorated that the workers left them undisturbed and simply paved over them so that there are more graves scattered under Valley Boulevard and beneath adjacent area businesses. The area also was a Native American burial ground before the bodies of settlers filled the cemetery. Savannah Pioneer Cemetery is located at the intersection of Mission Drive and Valley Boulevard. It is reputed to be the oldest Protestant cemetery in Los Angeles County. The El Monte Cemetery Association, incorporated in 1920, is responsible for the maintenance and upkeep of the cemetery. The association's funding comes from private donations and fundraising activities.

== Commerce ==
A small portion of the Montebello Town Center is actually located within Rosemead city limits. It features major department stores, smaller shops and a small food court. The boundary line between Montebello and Rosemead runs through the eastern end of the shopping mall. Policing is provided by the City of Montebello.

There is an Asian shopping center on Garvey Avenue in Rosemead, formerly The Diamond Square Shopping Center, featuring many restaurants and many Chinese shops. Now called, The Square, it houses a GW Supermarket. Rosemead Place, housing a Target, is located on Rosemead Boulevard near the South El Monte and El Monte city limits.

== Media ==
Rosemead community news are covered on the San Gabriel Valley Tribune which is a paid daily newspaper and Mid-Valley News and Rosemead Reader, which are community weeklies.

The 2025 independent drama film Rosemead, directed by Eric Lin and starring Lucy Liu, is based on a true story regarding events that took place in the city.

== Notable people ==
- Margaret Hayes Clark, politician and mayor of Rosemead
- Isaias Hellman, German-Jewish banker and philanthropist, and a founding father of the University of Southern California
- Taboo (of The Black Eyed Peas)
- Toscha Seidel, violinist
- Vikki Carr, singer
- Bob Mackie, fashion designer
- Rod Marinelli, former head coach, Detroit Lions, born in Rosemead
- Prima J, musical group
- Jose Flores, MLB baseball player
- Audie Desbrow (drummer for rock band Great White), born and raised in Rosemead.
- Venus D-Lite, drag queen

== Sister cities ==
- Keelung, Taiwan
- Zapopan, Jalisco, Mexico
