= William H. Workman =

American politician and businessman (1839–1918)

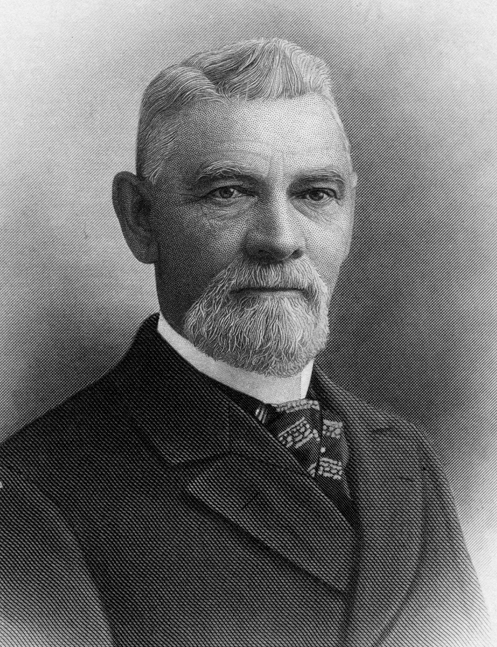
- Workman in 1880

18th Mayor of Los Angeles
- In office December 14, 1886 – December 10, 1888
- Preceded by: Edward F. Spence
- Succeeded by: John Bryson

Member of the Los Angeles Common Council for the 2nd ward
- In office December 5, 1872 – December 18, 1874
- In office December 9, 1875 – December 6, 1877

Member of the Los Angeles Common Council for the 4th ward
- In office December 5, 1878 – December 11, 1880

Personal details
- Born: January 1, 1839 New Franklin, Missouri
- Died: February 21, 1918 (aged 79) Boyle Heights, Los Angeles
- Party: Democratic
- Spouse: Maria Elizabeth Boyle
- Children: Boyle Workman

William Henry Workman (January 1, 1839 – February 21, 1918) was an American politician, banker and businessman. He served two terms as the 18th and 19th Mayor of Los Angeles, California.

== Early life ==
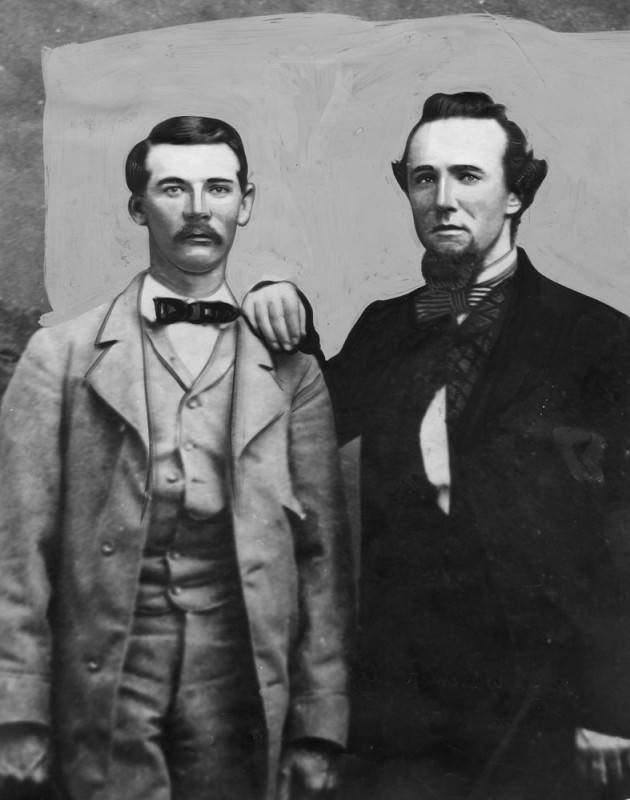
Workman with John King in 1867.

Workman was born in New Franklin, Missouri, the son of David Workman (1797–1855) and Nancy Hook (1807–1888). He had two older brothers, Thomas H. (1832–1863) and Elijah H. (1835–1906). William, named for his uncle William Workman (1799–1876), a well-known rancher, farmer and banker in Los Angeles County, was raised in Howard County, Missouri, until the age of 15. David Workman ran a saddlery in Missouri for many years; an apprentice in the mid-1820s was Christopher "Kit" Carson, who ran away from the Workman business and later became a famed scout and mountain man in New Mexico. David opened a store in Gold Rush-era Sacramento; following a fire that destroyed seven-eighths of the city and destroyed the business, David journeyed south to visit his brother William Workman and was convinced to resettle in the Los Angeles area. In April 1854, the David Workman family, including 15-year-old William, crossed the plains to California. While resting and restocking supplies at Salt Lake City, the family was approached by Brigham Young, leader of the Mormons, about staying there. The family declined and moved on, arriving at William Workman's Rancho La Puente in October.

David ran sheep and cattle to the gold mines for his brother, the elder William, but was killed in an accident in late June 1855, falling off a cliff while searching for a stray animal. After his death, David's widow Nancy and her sons moved to Los Angeles, residing on Main Street. Thomas went to work as secretary for noted transportation magnate Phineas Banning, married Alice Woodworth, and died in the explosion of the steamer Ada Hancock in April 1863, leaving no children.

Elijah, following the family profession, opened a saddlery in Los Angeles by 1857 and was joined by William shortly afterward. The two continued in partnership for most of the next twenty years, building up, as the Workman Brothers, a substantial business at their Main Street location.

William married Maria Elizabeth Boyle (1847–1933) on October 17, 1867, in Los Angeles. Maria was born in New Orleans, but after her mother died when she was young, was raised for a time by relatives while her father, Andrew A. Boyle (1818–1871) relocated to San Francisco. Not long after sending for his daughter, Boyle moved to Los Angeles, buying a tract of land east of the Los Angeles River called "Paredon Blanco" (White Bluffs). Boyle ran a shoe store and also the existing vineyard at Paredon Blanco, as well as served on the City Council during the 1860s. William H. Workman and Maria Boyle had seven children, including Boyle Workman.

== Political career ==
Workman served several terms on the Los Angeles Common Council, between 1872 and 1880, and was a proxy delegate at the 1872 Democratic National Convention in Baltimore. During his council tenure, he was on the committee that planned the city's first high school, which opened in 1873.

He served two terms as Mayor of Los Angeles from December 14, 1886, to December 10, 1888. He was a conservative Democrat at a time of Republican dominance of politics in the growing city. His mayoral term, lasting the two years of 1887 and 1888, occurred during the years known as the "Boom of the Eighties," during which several parks, including today's MacArthur Park, were established and a new city hall was built. He was also instrumental in overseeing the revision of the city charter and the transfer of the mayor's duties as city judge to a separate judicial figure.

He also served on the city parks commission in the 1890s, when several major parks, including Westlake, Eastlake [now Lincoln] and Hollenbeck, donated by him and Elizabeth Hollenbeck in memory or Mrs. Hollenbeck's husband and Workman's real estate partner, John, in the Boyle Heights neighborhood, and others were created.

He was the treasurer of the city for three terms from 1901 to 1907. During his three terms as treasurer, he assisted in the transfer of municipal water control from private to public ownership and initiated the financial dealings for the early stages of the monumental Los Angeles Aqueduct project.

== Boyle Heights ==
Workman inherited valuable and productive vineyards and orchards from his father-in-law, Andrew A. Boyle. After Andrew Boyle's death, Workman decided, during the first development boom of the city, which took place from 1868 to 1875, to subdivide much of Paredon Blanco and create the community of Boyle Heights. In spring 1875, the announcement was made publicly, but the collapse of the local economy the following year stunted the growth of Boyle Heights until a new development boom in the late 1880s. By the end of the 19th century, Boyle Heights was a premier residential area of town. Later, it developed into one of the city's most diverse communities and was home to a unique mix of Latinos, Jews, Molokan Russians, Italians, Japanese and other ethnic and religious groups. After the 1950s, the neighborhood became primarily Latino and especially attracted new migrants from Mexico and Central America. The recent opening of the extension of the Metro Gold Line has been welcomed by both optimism for a renewal of the aging community and concern about the loss of its Latino identity through gentrification.

In between and after political office-holding, Workman maintained a successful real estate office for many years, was president of the American Savings Bank, and continued to work until his death.

William H. Workman died at age 79 of heart failure at his home in Boyle Heights. He is interred in Evergreen Cemetery. His son, Boyle, who was his father's assistant during the mayoral and treasurer terms, was a multi-term city councilman from 1919 and 1927 and served as president of that body. Boyle's memoir, "The City That Grew", was published in 1935 and is still read for its tales of family and regional history.

== See also ==
- Boyle-Workman family
- Workman-Temple family
- Workman and Temple Family Homestead Museum
- Workman High School
