= Rosemead School District =

School district in California, United States

Address
- 3907 Rosemead Boulevard Rosemead, California, 91770; United States

District information
- Type: Public
- Grades: K–8
- NCES District ID: 0633570

Students and staff
- Students: 2,341
- Teachers: 109.0
- Staff: 126.37
- Student–teacher ratio: 21.48

Other information
- Website: www.rosemead.k12.ca.us

The Rosemead School District is a school district headquartered in Rosemead, California, serving the northern portion of the city.

== Schools ==
Middle schools:

- Muscatel Middle School

Elementary schools:

- Encinita Elementary School
- Mildred B. Janson Elementary School
- Savannah Elementary School
- Emma W. Shuey Elementary School

All students who attend Muscatel Middle School continue their public education at Rosemead High School, which is not a part of this district. High school public education for the area is provided by Rosemead High School which is a part of the El Monte Union High School District.
