= Rancho La Puente =

Historic ranch in Southern California, United States

Coordinates: 34.030°N 117.960°W

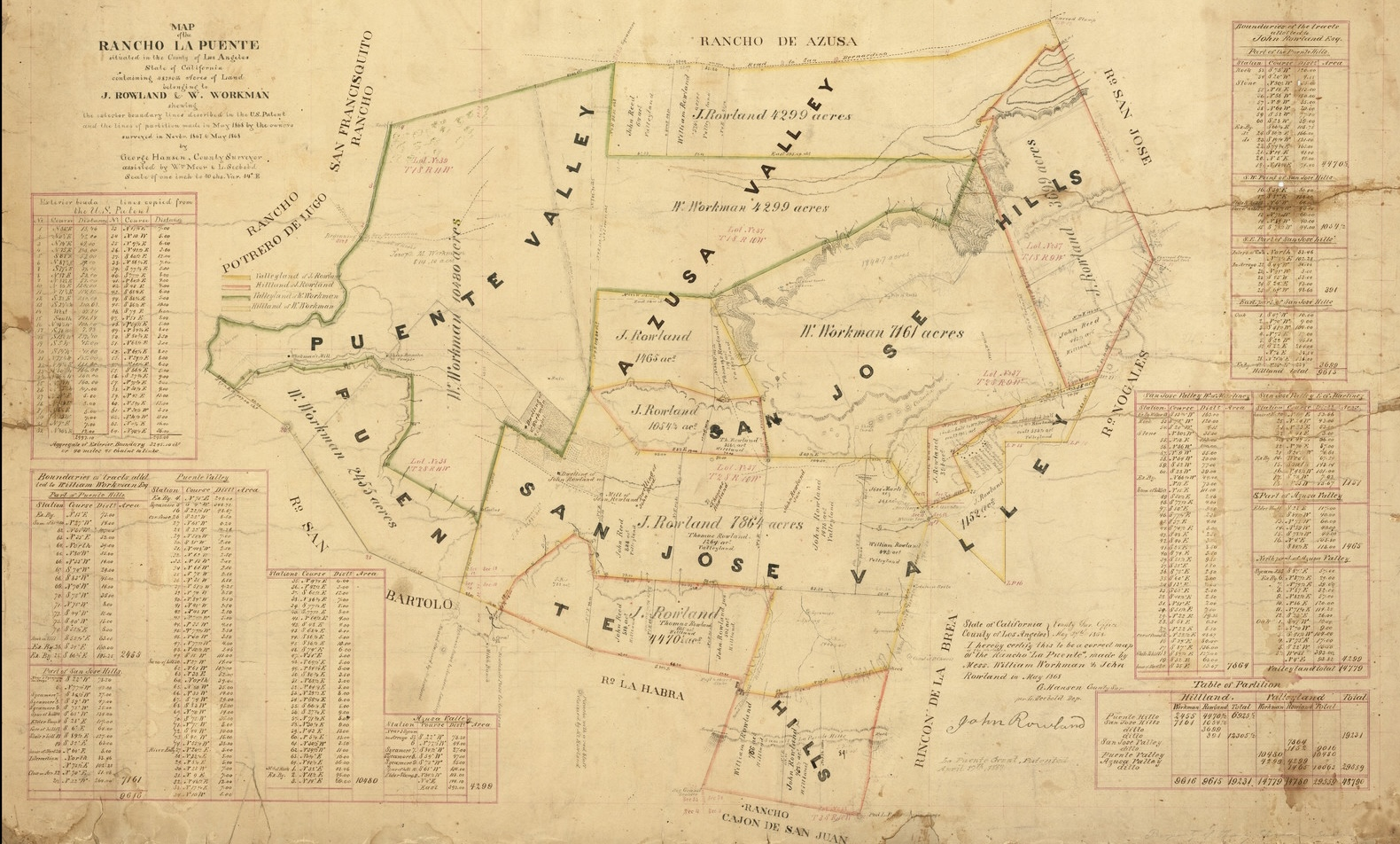
Partition map of Rancho La Puente, Geo. Hanson, Surveyor, 1868.

Rancho La Puente was a ranch in the southern San Gabriel Valley that measured just under 49,000 acres (200 km^{2}), and remained intact from its establishment in the late 1700s as an outpost of Mission San Gabriel until about 1870. By modern landmarks, the ranch extended from San Gabriel River on the west to just west of the 57 Freeway on the east and from Ramona Boulevard/San Bernardino Road on the north to the Puente Hills on the south. All but 40 acres (160,000 m^{2}), which fall within Orange County, are within Los Angeles County. The present communities of Avocado Heights, Bassett, Baldwin Park, San Dimas, Rowland Heights, Hacienda Heights, City of Industry, La Puente, Walnut, Covina, West Covina, and small sections of South El Monte and Irwindale are contained within the old boundaries of Rancho La Puente.

== History ==
The name "La Puente" originates from the Spanish Portola Expedition of 1769-1770, the first land-based exploration of Alta California by Europeans. In July, 1769 the party came north through "la abra" (later altered into La Habra), "an opening" or pass through the Puente Hills. Descending down into a valley the expedition dubbed "San Miguel" (now the San Gabriel Valley), the group headed northwest and camped near a large stream (now the San Gabriel River). Father Juan Crespi noted in his diary that the expedition had to build a bridge ("la puente") to cross the stream because the channel was so miry. That first bridge, and later more permanent bridges across the river, gave the area its name.

The Rancho La Puente was created as one of many outlying ranchos operated by Mission San Gabriel from its founding in 1771 at Whittier Narrows and its relocation to its current site within four years. The Mexican government secularized the missions in the middle 1830s, at which time the mission ranchos passed into private ownership.

At the end of 1841, a group of travelers and settlers arrived in the Los Angeles area from New Mexico, now referred to as the Workman-Rowland Party. Led by American John A. Rowland (ca. 1797-1873) and British native William Workman (1799–1876), the expedition contained American, European, and New Mexican members who settled throughout California. Rowland traveled, in early 1842, to the capital at Monterey and petitioned Governor Juan Bautista Alvarado for the Rancho La Puente. The grant was finalized in March with boundaries specified as ".... being on the East bounded by El Chino and San Jose, and on the West by the River San Gabriel on the North by the land of Don Luis Arenas, and on the South by the lands of the Senor [Juan] Perez of the los Nietos and los Coyotes ...." or "more or less" four square leagues, or 17,740-acre (71.8 km^{2}) . Strangely, William Workman, who had been implicated in what was claimed to be an assassination attempt of New Mexico's governor during a period in which the independent Republic of Texas plotted to annex most of that territory, was not included in the original grant, although a document was issued by Alvarado at the time of the grant, extending the rights and privileges of use of the rancho to Workman. This document is in the collection of the Workman and Temple Family Homestead Museum but was never submitted to the Land Commission to determine the validity of a Rowland and Workman claim to the land.

After Workman, as captain, and Rowland, as lieutenant, of an American and European military contingent helped Pio Pico defeat Governor Manuel Micheltorena in an armed standoff at Cahuenga Pass near Los Angeles in February 1845, Pico issued a new grant to Rancho La Puente. Made in July 1845, the grant extended the size of the rancho to the maximum allowed under Mexican land law, eleven square leagues, or 48,790.55 acres (197.4484 km^{2}). When Rowland submitted an affidavit claiming (unbelievably) that Workman was inadvertently left off the earlier grant, Pico officially added Workman as co-owner.

After the conquest of the Mexican department of Alta California by the United States during the Mexican-American War, the article of the 1848 Treaty of Guadalupe Hidalgo, which would have provided that Spanish and Mexican-era land grants be honored, was stricken at the insistence of President James K. Polk and Congress. With the onset of the Gold Rush and the arrival of tens of thousands of Americans to California, disputes over rancho lands became significant. Consequently, Congress passed legislation on 3 March 1851 requiring holders of Spanish and Mexican land titles to file a claim before a commission for adjudication. Approvals were automatically appealed by the federal government to the federal courts, as far as the United Supreme Court.

A claim for Rancho La Puente was filed with the Public Land Commission in Fall 1852 when the commission held proceedings in Los Angeles, but after the land commission approved the claim two years later, the government appealed to the courts on the ground that the Pico grant was not legitimate. The federal government had every right to be suspicious of claims to land especially when grants presumably had taken place following Pico's ascendency to governor and the occupation by the US. People presented claims for land the proceedings of which were not reflected in the government records. At the Los Angeles federal district court, Rowland and Workman won two separate appeals, in 1856 and 1862, and it appeared that the government was going to take the matter to the Supreme Court. The Civil War years saw the claim in limbo and Rowland hired an attorney to secure a patent. Finally, in April 1867, the lawyer's efforts were successful and the patent patented was issued.

With the patent secured and La Puente's owners approaching their seventies, the two decided, in 1868, to formally partition the rancho, leaving the two men exact allotments of hill and valley land, so that Rowland mainly occupied the northern and eastern part and Workman the western and central portions. Rowland, who returned to New Mexico in 1842 to bring his family back to California, built an adobe on the north side of San Jose Creek the following year. A dozen years later, he razed the structure and built, across the creek, a brick Greek Revival two-story house (the John A. Rowland House) for his second wife, Charlotte M. Gray. Rowland, who built the first private grist mill in the county in 1847, mainly concerned himself with cattle ranching and farming, achieving great success. He died in October 1873 and was buried at the El Campo Santo Cemetery established by Workman. His many heirs took over, but over the years land was sold off, including for the creation of the towns of La Puente and Covina during the famed Boom of the Eighties (1886–88).

William Workman, whose family accompanied him to California, lived in a temporary shelter through the winter of 1841-42 and then constructed an adobe the following summer, believed to have been three rooms. The adobe was expanded to ten rooms in two southward-facing wings by 1856 and then remodeled with the addition of brick rooms at the corners and on a new second floor, this work being completed by 1870. Workman, also a highly successful cattle rancher and farmer, entered business activities (real estate, oil, and banking, among others) with his son-in-law, Francisco P. Temple (F. P. F.), and the two were the wealthiest individuals in Los Angeles County during the first half of the 1870s, during which the first growth boom experienced in the region took place. When the economy turned sour, however, and the Temple and Workman bank collapsed, Workman, who had mortgaged most of his portion of La Puente for a loan from Elias J. "Lucky" Baldwin of San Francisco, lost everything and took his own life in May 1876. Workman's house and 70 acres (280,000 m^{2}) was sold back to the Temple family by Baldwin in 1880—today's Workman and Temple Family Homestead is the 6-acre (24,000 m^{2}) remnant of this property. Baldwin retained ownership of thousands of acres of Workman's former holdings until his death in 1909, though some land, notably for the town of Baldwin Park, was sold. In 1911, Baldwin's estate sold off more La Puente land for the subdivision of North Whittier Heights, now Hacienda Heights.

== Historic sites of the Rancho ==
The remaining historic sites left from the rancho era are the Workman House (1842 adobe and 1870 brick additions), El Campo Santo Cemetery (1850s with 1919-21 renovations), and a water tower (ca. 1880s)--all on the grounds of the Workman and Temple Family Homestead Museum and the John A. Rowland House (1855), now undergoing long-awaited renovations under the auspices of the Historical Society of La Puente Valley. There is also an 1880s adobe house that was built by John Rowland's son, William R. Rowland, and is under the ownership of the City of Walnut and is at Lemon Creek Bicentennial Park.

== See also ==
- Ranchos of California
- List of Ranchos of California
