= Workman–Temple family =

The Workman–Temple family relates to the pioneer interconnected Workman and Temple families that were prominent in: the history of colonial Pueblo de Los Angeles and American Los Angeles; the Los Angeles Basin and San Gabriel Valley regions; and Southern California from 1830 to 1930 in Mexican Alta California and the subsequent state of California, United States.

== William Workman ==
=== England ===
William ('Don Julian') Workman (January 15, 1802–May 17, 1876) was born in Temple Sowerby, Westmorland, now Cumbria, England, to Thomas Workman (1763–1843) and Nancy Hook (1771–1830). When William was eleven years old, his father inherited a substantial home and property in nearby Clifton from a childless aunt and uncle and relocated his family there. In 1814, the Workmans issued cash bequests upon their three sons, with the eldest, David Workman, using half his money to migrate to the United States in 1817. David settled in the new town of Franklin, Missouri, the virtual western end of the country, in 1819. There he opened a saddlery, returning to England three years later to retrieve the remainder of his bequest. In the process, David convinced William to join him, and the two brothers sailed from Liverpool and landed at Philadelphia, Pennsylvania in September 1822.

=== New Mexico ===
William Workman stayed in Franklin for three years, working for his brother, before joining an early caravan on the Santa Fe Trail, which opened in Franklin, Missouri in 1821. He traveled to Santa Fe de Nuevo México-New Spain in the spring of 1825. He settled in Taos where he did some fur trapping, opened a store, and, in partnership with American John A. Rowland, manufactured liquor. Taos was popular among fur traders who wintered in the town and enjoyed their liquor after months in the back country.

== Workman family ==
William Workman had a common-law marriage with Maria Nicolasa Urioste de Valencia (April 19, 1802–February 4, 1892), (Pueblo), for more than a decade. After they migrated to Pueblo de Los Angeles in 1844, they had a church marriage at the nearby Mission San Gabriel Arcángel. The couple had two surviving children, Antonia Margarita (1830–1892) and Joseph Manuel Workman (ca. 1833–1901.)

While a success as a merchant and distiller, Workman was embroiled in the difficult local politics of the period in Nuevo México. He and his partner John A. Rowland were forced to swear loyalty to rebels in the Taos Revolt, who assassinated the departmental Mexican governor in 1837. After a counter-revolt squashed the Taoseño rebellion, Workman and Rowland were arrested for smuggling. A few years later, when the independent Republic of Texas and its president, Mirabeau B. Lamar, sought to extend its boundary to the Rio Grande, thereby annexing the principal towns of New Mexico, Workman and Rowland were named agents of the Texans in New Mexico. Although it is unclear whether they sought the position, and they were soon replaced, they decided to leave for Alta California early in 1841.

=== Southern California ===
In September of that year, a group of up to sixty-five or so members, including Americans, Europeans and New Mexicans, left New Mexico and took the Old Spanish Trail to the Los Angeles pueblo. The 1,200-mile (1,900 km) journey was completed by late fall, when John Rowland presented a letter of recommendation from New Mexico's American consul and a list of expedition members to the authorities in Los Angeles.

The Workman-Rowland Party was long considered the first American wagon train to Los Angeles. But in fact the party could not use wagons because of the difficult Old Spanish Trail route, nor were they solely Americans. Workman commemorated his arrival in Southern California with a glass plaque (still in family hands) that dated his landfall as November 5, 1841, a British national holiday called Guy Fawkes' Day.

==== Rancho La Puente ====
Early in 1842, John A. Rowland obtained a Mexican land grant to Rancho La Puente, at that time 18,000 acres (73 km^{2}), from Governor Juan Bautista Alvarado. The Rancho was in the San Gabriel Valley about twenty miles (32 km) from Los Angeles. William Workman was not officially an owner at that time (possibly because he had not yet become a naturalized Mexican citizen), but he received an official document allowing him the privileges of an owner in settling on the rancho. In July 1845, Governor Pío Pico amended the La Puente grant, adding Workman's name officially as owner and expanding the rancho to the maximum allowable under Mexican land law, eleven square leagues, or almost 49,000 (48,790.55) acres, 48,790-acre (197 km^{2}). A portion of Rancho La Puente later was developed as the city of La Puente. Workman occupied the western portions of the rancho and built an adobe home on the property in 1842. It was expanded by 1856 and significantly remodeled by 1870.

=== Mexican American War ===
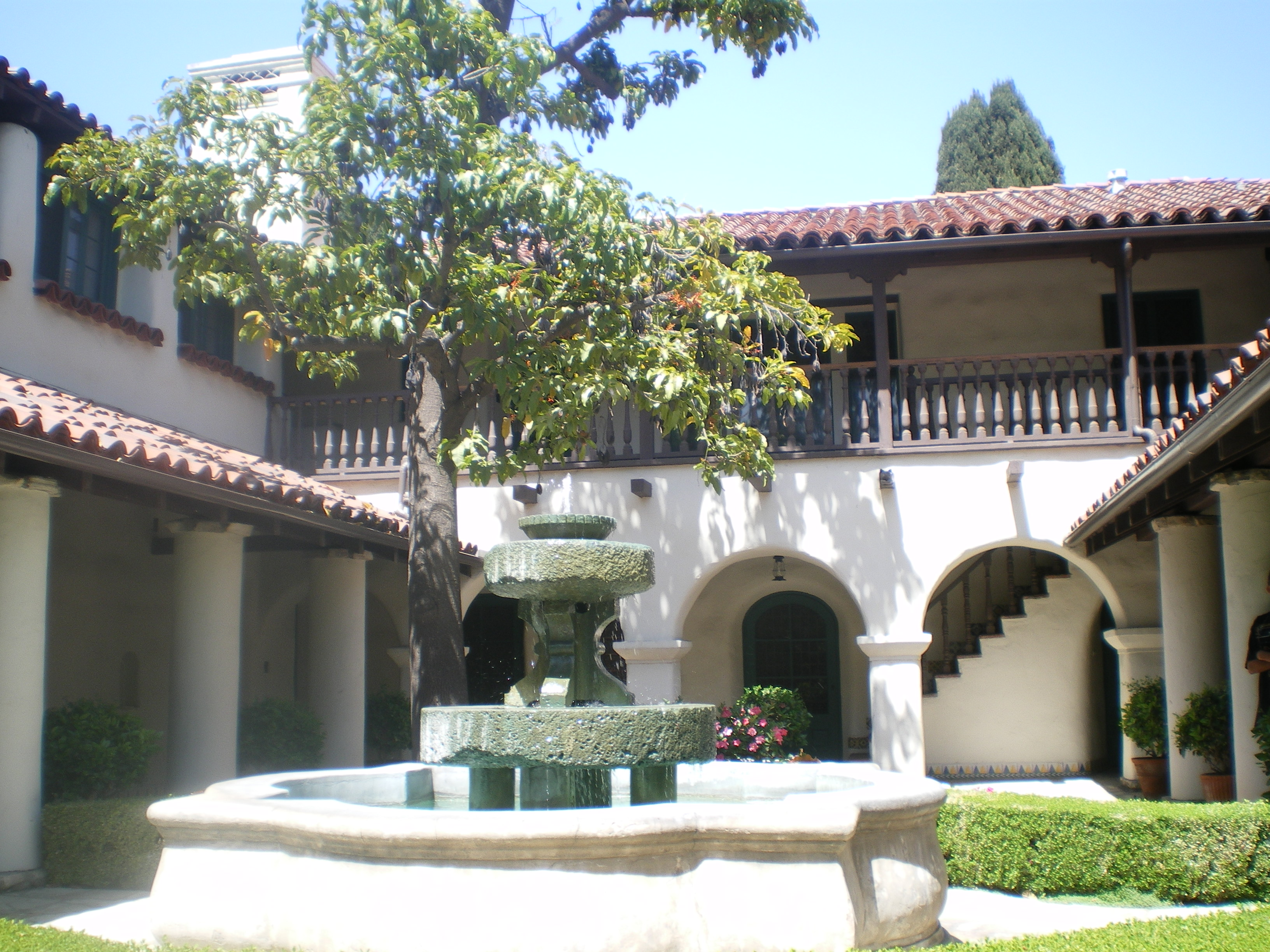
The Workman House courtyard, at the Workman and Temple Family Homestead Museum.

The mid-1840s were a tumultuous period because there were two closely timed military actions occurring: the struggle between the Californios and Mexican appointed leaders from outside California, and the occupation and annexation of California by US forces and migrants following its victory in the Mexican-American War. In early 1845, William Workman was appointed captain of a cadre of Americans and Europeans serving with Governor Pío Pico in his standoff with appointed Governor Manuel Micheltorena at the battle at Cahuenga Pass of the Mexican–American War, northwest of Los Angeles. Although the battle that ensued was limited to minimal gunfire and no casualties, Workman, his lieutenant John Rowland, Benjamin Davis Wilson, and James McKinley from the Pico side worked out a surrender option with Americans and Europeans on the Micheltorena side. The former Mexican governor was allowed to leave California by ship.

Pico assumed the governorship. He relocated the Alta California capital from Monterey to Los Angeles. Together with his plan to move the customs house to San Pedro Bay, among other issues, this roused northerner José Castro to mount a challenge to Pico's authority. Workman was appointed to lead the defense of Los Angeles against an incursion by Castro's forces. At the same time he learned that the United States army was ready to invade the department of Alta California for other actions in the Mexican-American War.

William Workman played an important role in subsequent events during the Mexican–American War. A group of Americans, including Benjamin D. Wilson and Rowland, were seized in late summer 1846 at the Rancho Santa Ana del Chino house of Isaac Williams. Workman and neighboring ranchero Ignacio Palomares worked to free the prisoners, who were held at Paredon Blanco (later Boyle Heights.) After the native Californios, in the Siege of Los Angeles, were successful in expelling the American force left to guard the town after the initial conquest by U.S. forces, another American invasion was being led by Commodore Robert F. Stockton. Workman met Stockton at Mission San Juan Capistrano just after New Year's Day 1847 and arranged an amnesty for all Californios who would resist the American retaking of Los Angeles.

When the last battle of the war on California soil was fought in the San Fernando Valley in Cahuenga Pass on 9 January 1845, Workman and two others brought out the flag of truce the following morning at Campo de Cahuenga. Notably, the legislature of Alta California ordered Governor Pío Pico to go to Mexico (based in Mexico City) and request assistance. When Pico returned to Los Angeles in 1848, he spent some time at Workman's residence. When the ex-governor refused to present himself to Jonathan D. Stevenson, the US military commander at Los Angeles, Stevenson raged that Workman was complicit in this defiance. He said that Workman was "ever hostile to the American cause." Suspicion by the US military was also cast toward the motives of ranchero and major landowner Hugo Reid, who had settled in California after immigrating from Scotland.

Nine days before the Treaty of Guadalupe Hidalgo was ratified by the Mexican Congress, James W. Marshall discovered gold at Sutter's Mill on 24 January 1848. The resulting California Gold Rush brought a huge economic windfall to Workman, whose hide-and-tallow trade activities with his cattle ranching paled compared to the need for fresh beef and other supplies in the gold regions. The wealth generated allowed Workman to expand his ranching enterprises, enlarge his house, build a cemetery and chapel on his grounds, and acquire real estate.

=== Expansion and agriculture ===
One such acquisition came in 1850 when Workman, who had loaned money to grantee Casilda Soto de Lobo, foreclosed on the Rancho La Merced. He gave the property to his ranch foreman, Juan Matías Sánchez, and his daughter, Margarita, and her husband, P. F. Temple, Francisco P. Temple - F.P.T. Subsequently, with his son-in-law F.P. Temple and Juan Sanchez, Workman acquired neighboring ranchos, including Rancho Potrero Grande, Rancho Potrero de Felipe Lugo, and Rancho Potrero Chico, in the area generally known as Misión Vieja or Old Mission, around the first site of Mission San Gabriel at Whittier Narrows. Workman later had interests in what are today's Beverly Hills and Glendale. He also had a claim to the Lytle Canyon area near Rancho Cucamonga and Cajon Pass.

By 1861 Workman was engaged predominantly in livestock raising, holding 3,000 head of cattle and 600 horses. He had a ten-acre vineyard and fruit trees (apple, fig, peach, pear and pomegranate). His ornamental garden of about 90 square feet at the back of the house was stocked with tropical fruit and flowers. The chapel was being built with brick made on site. Workman provided horses to the US government during the Civil War. Although the cattle industry was buffeted by the decline of the Gold Rush and battered by the importation of better breeds from Texas, environmental disasters decimated it as a mainstay of the regional economy. The dual disasters of flood in 1861-62 and drought from 1862 to 1865, caused the loss of much stock. Fortunately for Workman, his friend, William Wolfskill, found water and grass in the Mojave Desert, in today's Apple Valley area. He invited Workman and John Rowland to send their herds there. Even after losing 25% of his cattle herd, Workman still maintained an inventory of thousands of head into the 1870s.

Still, after 1865 he moved quickly to expand and diversify his agricultural production. He had raised wine grapes since the 1840s, and now built three wine-making and storing structures of brick. He had d some 60,000 vines on about 100 acres (0.40 km^{2}) of vineyards. He also had 5,000 acres (20 km^{2}) of wheat on the "Wheatfield Ranch" north of his home, and built a grist mill near the San Gabriel River. During the Civil War, he had experimented successfully with cotton, when the southern states were losing crops and market share. Finding transport to Eastern markets to be too difficult, he abandoned this crop.

=== Land development and banking ===
By 1870, Los Angeles was growing rapidly and Workman joined his ambitious son-in-law, F. P. F.(Francis Pliny Fisk) Temple, in the emerging business arena of the nascent city. The two men invested in real estate subdivisions, notably: Lake Vineyard in today's Alhambra and San Marino in the San Rafael Hills; and Centinela near the Centinela Adobe area in Rancho Aguaje de la Centinela-Rancho Sausal Redondo, in the present day Los Angeles International Airport-LAX area; some of the first oil speculating in the Santa Susana Mountains near present-day Santa Clarita, and others.

The two men invested in early railroads too, such as the Los Angeles and Independence Railroad project from Santa Monica to Panamint City and the Panamint Range mines. To finance these projects, the two joined forces with young merchant Isaias W. Hellman and formed the second bank in Los Angeles: Hellman, Temple and Company (1868–71.) When Temple and Hellman split over disagreements, Workman being a silent partner, Hellman formed Farmers and Merchants Bank with ex-Governor and pioneer L.A. banker John G. Downey, while Temple and Workman went on their own.

The banking house of Temple and Workman (1871–1876) was popular, but largely for the wrong reasons. Temple's lending policy was liberal and the bank was poorly managed by head cashier Henry S. Ledyard. Further, the bank's investments in a wide range of projects were dangerously depleting cash reserves, especially after the state economy collapsed in a silver mining stock speculation fever at the Comstock Lode in Virginia City, Nevada in late August 1875. When news of the crash at San Francisco reached Los Angeles by telegraph, a panic broke out. Unable to meet the demand for cash by customers, Temple and Workman suspended business for thirty days and desperately needed an infusion of cash to stay open and stave off bankruptcy. After over three months, the bank finally reopened with a loan from Elias J. "Lucky" Baldwin, a San Francisco capitalist who precipitated the Virginia City crisis by selling off huge amounts of stock and who was investing in Los Angeles area real estate. Baldwin's demands for the loan were virtually impossible to meet, but Temple and Workman accepted nonetheless. With confidence in the bank irrevocably shaken, depositors quietly drained the institution dry of the borrowed funds and Temple and Workman closed on 13 January 1876.

The resulting inventory of the bank's affairs by the assignees revealed an unmitigated management disaster. Though Temple and Workman were worth several million dollars, most of that wealth was tied to land mortgaged to Baldwin. Workman, bewildered by events he had no hand in shaping, was visited by a court receiver named Richard Garvey, also an associate of Baldwin, on 17 May 1876. That evening, an ailing Workman took his own life at his home on his beloved rancho. He was 76 years old.

Workman's death led down the community by economic paralysis that plagued the community for the remainder of the decade and well into the next and the population of the city and county dropped for the only time since 1865. As a failed banker, Workman is little known today, though his home at the Workman and Temple Family Homestead Museum is open for visitation by those who want to know more about the life he lived in the Los Angeles area from the 1840s to the 1870s.

== Temple family - the next generation ==
The first marriage in Los Angeles city history in which both persons had "Anglo" surnames was in September 1845, of William Workman's daughter Antonia Margarita Workman (July 26, 1830–January 24, 1892) to Pliny Fisk Temple (Francisco P. Temple or F.P.T ) - February 13, 1822–April 27, 1880.) The Temples had eleven children, eight living into adulthood.

Pliny Fisk Temple-F.P.T was named for a Congregationalist missionary in Palestine, was born to Jonathan Temple and Lucinda Parker in Reading, Massachusetts, near Boston. After completing his education, he took ship around Cape Horn to California in January 1841, hoping to meet his half-brother, Jonathan Temple, who was twenty-six years older. Jonathan had left for the Sandwich Islands-Hawaiian Islands in the early 1820s before Pliny was born, then relocated to Pueblo de Los Angeles in 1828 and opened the town's first store. He became a prominent citizen. After six months sailing around the horn of South American to Monterey and then traveling south, Pliny arrived at Los Angeles around the first of July 1841. A visit with Jonathan turned into a permanent relocation and Pliny returned home just once, in summer 1870, to enroll two sons at Harvard and M.I.T. in Boston.

Pliny worked as a clerk in his brother Jonathan's store and, when the first small discovery of gold in California was made in Placerita Canyon in the San Gabriel Mountains north of Los Angeles in Spring 1842, he shipped gold dust to a brother in Reading who then sent it on to the national Philadelphia Mint. Perhaps it was at the Temple Store that Pliny met Margarita Workman.

The Antonia and Pliny Temple family lived in Los Angeles until 1849, while Pliny worked in Jonathan's store, and then left his employ for a brief sojourn in the northern gold fields. This was followed by F.P.Temple's return to Los Angeles, around which time William Workman granted them half of the 2,363-acre (9.56 km^{2}) Rancho La Merced in the Whittier Narrows near today's South El Monte, California. The Temples built a single-story adobe house, said to have measured 70 x 110 feet (34 m), and which later had a second floor of wood and was accompanied, by the 1870s, by a two-story French Second Empire (architecture)-style brick dwelling. The Temple ranch had vineyards, orchards, a grist mill, and was stocked with cattle, horses and other animals. Temple also was among the first in Los Angeles County to raise thoroughbred horses, starting in the early 1860s. He also was the owner of much property outside the county, including: horse grazing land in Alameda County, California; thousands of acres in Madera County and Fresno County, California; lumber mills in San Antonio Canyon in the San Gabriel Mountains above modern Claremont, California and at Rancho San Jacinto y San Gorgonio near today's Idyllwild, California; and cattle ranch lands, a slaughterhouse and a butcher shop in Springfield, California and Columbia, California in Tuolumne County's famed gold centers.

F.P.Temple was also politically involved, serving as Los Angeles City Treasurer in 1851–52, on the first Los Angeles County board of supervisors in 1852-53 and as Los Angeles county treasurer in 1876–77. He was a rare Whig/Republican in a county political world completely dominated by Democrats - specifically, Southern Democrats.

By the time Los Angeles experienced its first significant growth after the United States Civil War, F.P.Temple dove headlong into business projects that were intended to ride the wave of the boom. As discussed above in the section on William Workman, the silent partner in the partnership Temple spearheaded, the wave eventually crashed and ruined the fortunes of the Temple and Workman families by 1876. Temple's personal popularity among his fellow citizens spared him the wrath that might otherwise have been directed to the president of a failed bank, although he suffered the first of a series of strokes within months after the closure of the bank. Largely confined to a small portion of his Rancho La Merced, Temple died at age 58 of another stroke, then called apoplexy, though claims by some writers seeking to romanticize the story further than warranted claimed he died in a "rude sheepherder's hut" on a corner of the rancho.

=== Later generations ===
The tenth child of F. P.F. Temple and Margarita Workman, Walter P. Temple (June 7, 1869–November 13, 1938) brought a resurgence of his family in regional affairs through oil, real estate, construction, and philanthropy in the 1920s. In 1903, Walter Temple married Laurenza Gonzalez, a member of an early Californio family, who was born and raised just a stone's throw away from Temple in the Misión Vieja (Old Mission) community in present Whittier Narrows. The two had five children, four living to adulthood, and the family lived on a 50-acre (200,000 m^{2}) parcel inherited from Walter's mother after her death in 1892. With longtime friend, Milton Kauffman, however, Temple acquired 60 acres (240,000 m^{2}) to the west at the corner of the Montebello Hills that had belonged to his father before the 1876 failure of the bank of Temple and Workman and sold the former Temple Homestead. Living in an 1869 adobe built by Rafael Basye, the Temples ranched and farmed on their new holdings when their eldest child, Thomas, discovered oil in Spring 1914. After leasing the tract to Standard Oil Company of California, which brought in the first producing well in June 1917, the Temples were the beneficiaries of some two dozen wells drilled over the next several years, including a few major gushers.

William Workman's son José Manuel Workman (February 10, 1833–March 13, 1901) married Josephine Belt (December 19, 1851 – July 1, 1937), a native of Stockton in January 1870 in San Francisco. José and his wife had seven children. Their daughter Josephine Workman became silent movie actress Mona Darkfeather (January 13, 1883–September 3, 1977), who portrayed American Indian women in films.

== Legacy ==
The historic "Workman House", the original adobe from 1842, with brick additions and a thorough remodel by 1870; "La Casa Nueva," the 1920s Spanish Colonial Revival architecture residence of Walter Temple and Laura Gonzalez; the 1850s "El Campo Santo Cemetery" Cemetery, a private family burial ground. All are at the Workman and Temple Family Homestead Museum.

=== Workman and Temple Family Homestead Museum ===
The historic Workman and Temple Family Homestead Museum, city owned and funded, is located in the City of Industry, a mile north of the Pomona Freeway — SR-60 at 15415 East Don Julian Road, just west of Hacienda Boulevard.

It has:

- The Workman House - adobe
- La Casa Nueva
- El Campo Santo

Free public guided tours are given Wednesday through Sunday from 1 to 4 p.m. There are large festivals, weekend living history tours, and other public events year-round.

== See also ==
- Workman and Temple Family
  - Juan Temple
  - Francisco P. Temple (February 13, 1822–April 27, 1880)
  - Josephine M. Workman–Mona Darkfeather (January 13, 1883–September 3, 1977)
- Boyle-Workman family
  - William H. Workman (January 1, 1839–February 21, 1918)
  - Boyle Workman (September 20, 1868–December 25, 1942)
- Workman and Temple Family Homestead Museum
  - El Campo Santo Cemetery
  - Evergreen Cemetery, Los Angeles
