= Workman and Temple Family Homestead Museum =

Historic house in California, United States

- Workman Adobe
- U.S. National Register of Historic Places
- California Historical Landmark
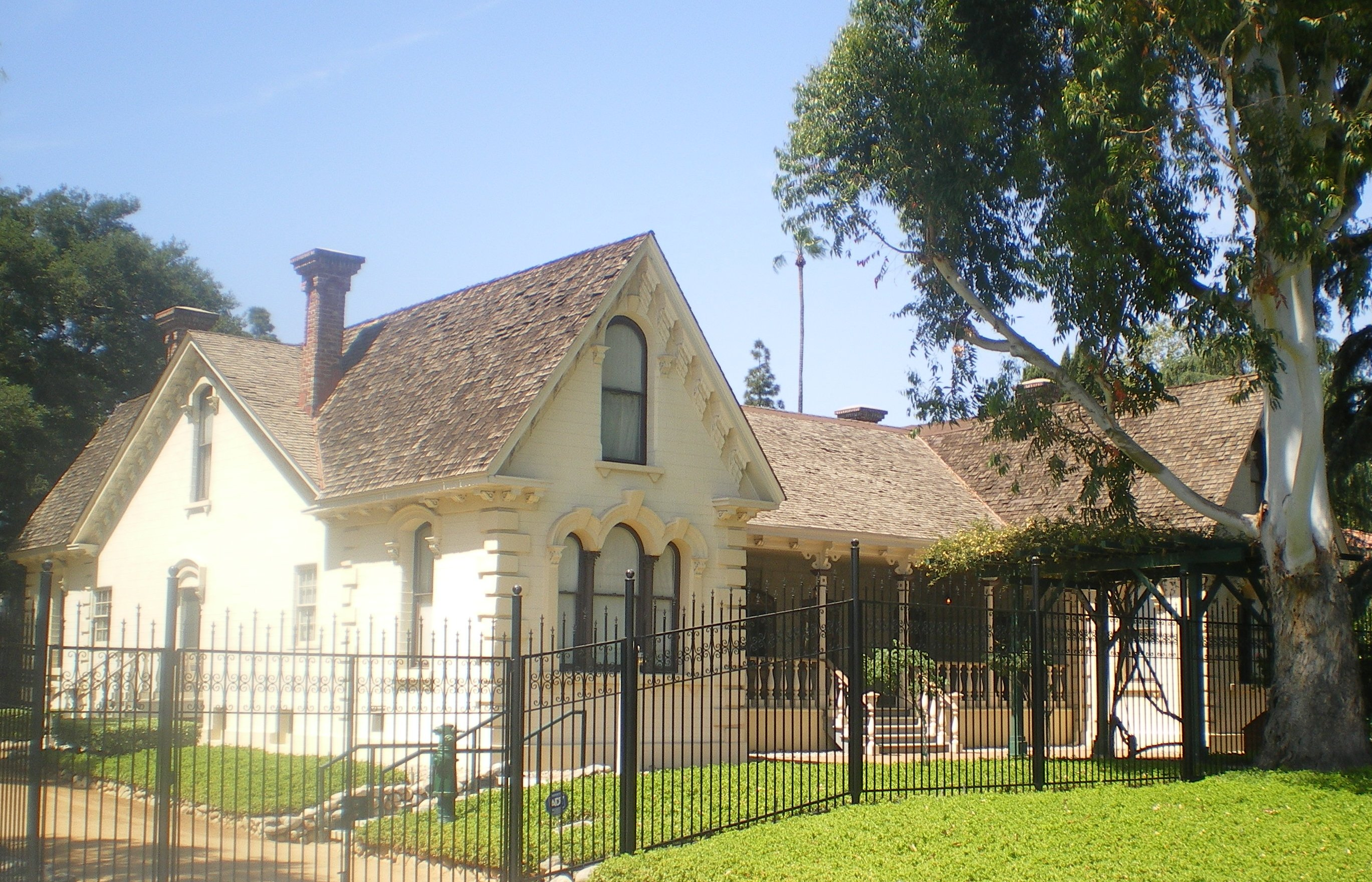

- Location within the Los Angeles metropolitan area Location within California Location within the United States
- Location: 15415 East Don Julian Rd., City of Industry, California
- Coordinates: 34°1′12″N 117°57′51″W
- Built: 1842, 1870 remodel
- Architect: Ezra F. Kysor (attributed 1870 remodel)
- Architectural style: Picturesque Country
- NRHP reference No.: 74000519
- CHISL No.: 874

Significant dates
- Added to NRHP: November 20, 1974
- Designated CHISL: November 18, 1974

The Workman and Temple Family Homestead Museum is a historic house museum at 15415 East Don Julian Road in City of Industry, California, that features the homes and private cemetery that belonged to the Workman-Temple family.

== Workman House ==
Born in England, William Workman (1799–1876) immigrated to the United States as a young man with his older brother David. He went to Taos, where he married and worked for some time. Then he went further west, to the San Gabriel Valley in 1841, then within Alta California of the Mexican Republic.

William bought part of the Rancho La Puente and built an adobe house in 1842. It was enlarged over the years and, by 1870, was remodeled with the addition of brick wings and a second story, as well as impressive exterior decorative details. This renovation was said to have been designed by the first trained architect in Los Angeles, Ezra F. Kysor, designer of the extant Pico House hotel, St. Vibiana's Cathedral, and the Perry House, all in Los Angeles. But there is no known documentation of Kysor's work on the building. The Workman Adobe was placed on the National Register of Historic Places (NRHP) on November 20, 1974. It was added to the California State Register of Historic Landmarks, No. 874, in conjunction with the family "El Campo Santo" Cemetery on the site. An historic marker was placed on the site on 5 November 1976, the 135th anniversary of the arrival of the Workman family to the area.

The broad outlines of the structure, including large porches on the north and south sides, measure 19' deep by 72' wide. There are eight rooms on the first floor and three finished rooms (with three others evidently finished in the late 19th century) on the second story. The home was dramatically altered over the years, especially when it was used for military school classrooms from 1930 to 1935. It was later used as a residence and then office and nurses' quarters for El Encanto sanitarium from 1940 to 1963. The home and cemetery were then purchased by the City of Industry. Many original details have long been lost, but historic elements survive, such as the ca. 1870 interior staircase, two marble coal-burning fireplaces from the same period, and a ceiling cartouche from that era. Late 1970s-era restoration efforts were limited to the outside of the structure. The entire east wall was reconstructed, as it was mostly of adobe and had collapsed during work in 1977.

== La Casa Nueva (Temple residence) ==
The Homestead Museum also includes "La Casa Nueva" – a spectacular example of Spanish Colonial Revival style, built by the Temple family between 1922 and 1927. The family's own design was drawn up by the well-known Los Angeles architectural firm of Walker and Eisen, although in 1924, Beverly Hills-based architect Roy Selden Price was hired to reconfigure the design.

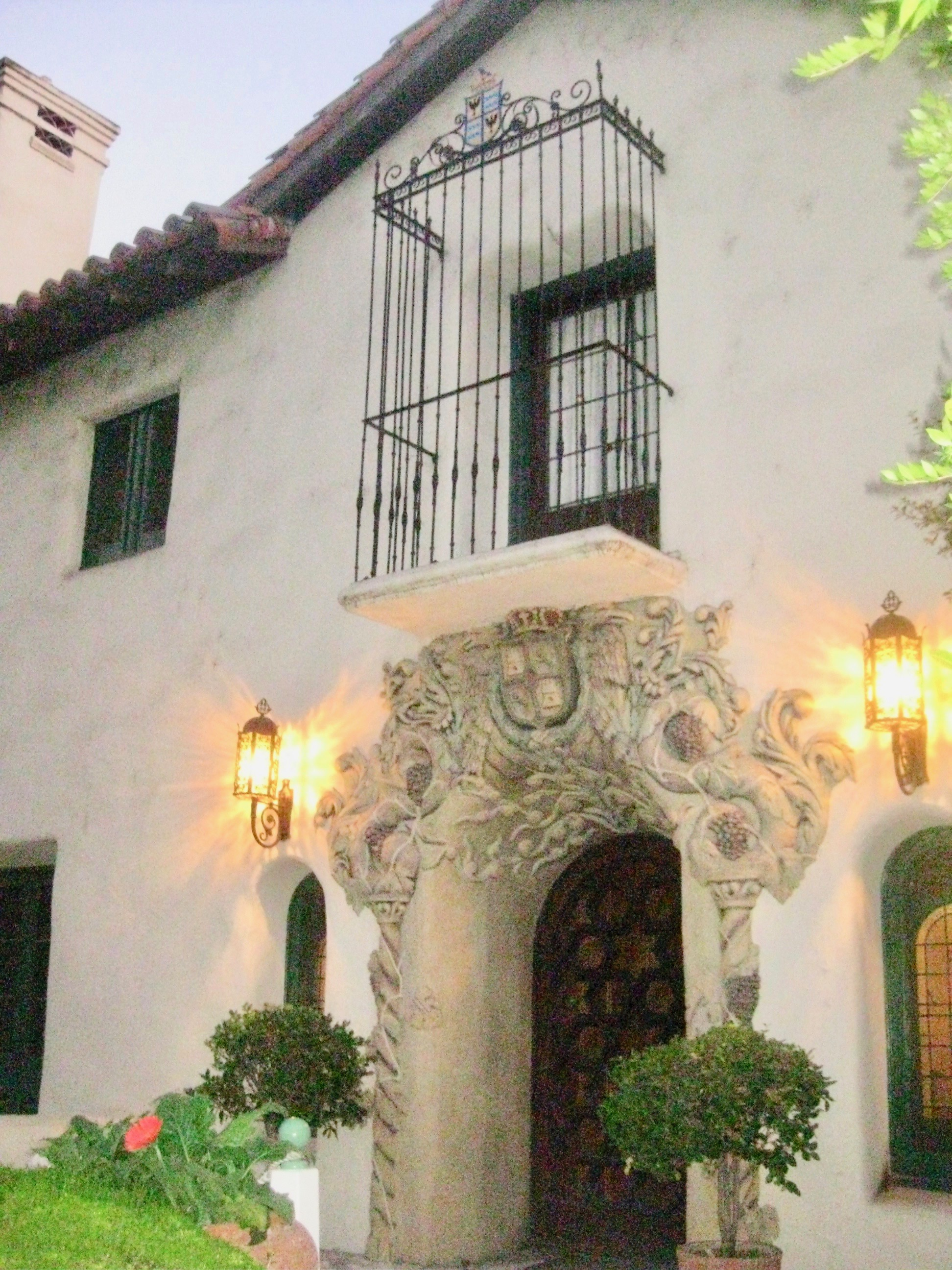
Temple residence entryway.

The structure is largely built of adobe bricks handmade by artisans led by Pablo Urzua of Guadalajara, Jalisco, while the supervising contractor was Sylvester Cook of Whittier. The home (9,000 square feet, as built, with 2,000 square feet (190 m^{2}) of dormitory space constructed in 1930 for a military school using the home) contains twenty-six rooms, including nine bedrooms, six bathrooms, a barber shop, commercial size electric cold storage unit, basement with a late 1870s bank vault for storage, and other notable features such as hand painted designs on windows as well as a vibrant use of stained glass of the period. The home is also unique as it features a madonna with child, however not with a traditional face, the face is more contemporary; wearing makeup, facial structure changed etc. The home was lived in by the Temple family for only two full years (1928 and 1929) as a fully completed structure, the home was leased to Lawrence Lewis, who was headmaster of a boys' military academy, Raenford (later Golden State), which moved from Redondo Beach and operated at the 92-acre (370,000 m^{2}) ranch from 1930 to 1935. The home and property were then owned by the California Bank and occupied by caretakers until purchased in October 1940 by Harry and Lois Brown, operators of El Encanto, a sanitarium moved to the site from Monrovia.

Restoration took place in subsequent years with the home opened as part of the Workman and Temple Family Homestead Museum in May 1981. While most of the house was intact, some replication was done and the house was almost entirely furnished with acquired period pieces, though some original family furniture and artifacts have been donated by Temple descendants.

== El Campo Santo Cemetery ==
The family cemetery, El Campo Santo, was established in the 1850s. The earliest documented date is the burial of founder William Workman's older brother, David, in November 1855. A year later, artist Henry Miller, touring California to visit and sketch the Spanish and Mexican-era Roman Catholic missions, stayed at the Workman House and prepared sketches for a chapel contemplated by Workman. On 30 May 1857, the cornerstone to St. Nicholas's Chapel (named in honor of Workman's wife, Nicolasa Urioste de Valencia) was laid and blessed by Bishop Thaddeus Amat. Construction of the Gothic Revival structure, which measured 24' x 48' and featured gilt ceilings and stained glass windows, was completed by the early 1860s. The cemetery was used exclusively as a private burial ground for Workman and Temple family members and friends. and Masses were regularly heard at the chapel, presumably celebrated by a priest visiting from Mission San Gabriel.

After the property, reduced from 24,000 to 75 acres (300,000 m^{2}) after the family's bank failed in 1876, was lost by the family in 1900, the chapel was said to have burned and was razed, as were three of the original brick enclosure walls. Numerous gravestones were removed and the site desecrated. A lawsuit by Walter Temple, Workman's grandson, in 1907 halted the destruction, but the cemetery languished for a decade until Temple, newly enriched with oil revenue from his Montebello ranch, bought the ranch and cemetery. From 1919 to 1921, Temple's first priority on the ranch was the renovation of El Campo Santo and the building of a mausoleum, designed by the architectural firm of Garstang and Rea, on the site of the chapel. The reopening of the cemetery took place in April 1921, at which time the remains of the last governor of Alta California, Pío Pico, and his wife, Ygnacia Alvarado, were placed in the mausoleum. It also contains the remains of other prominent pioneer families. The Workman Home And Family Cemetery are designated California Historical Landmark No. 874.

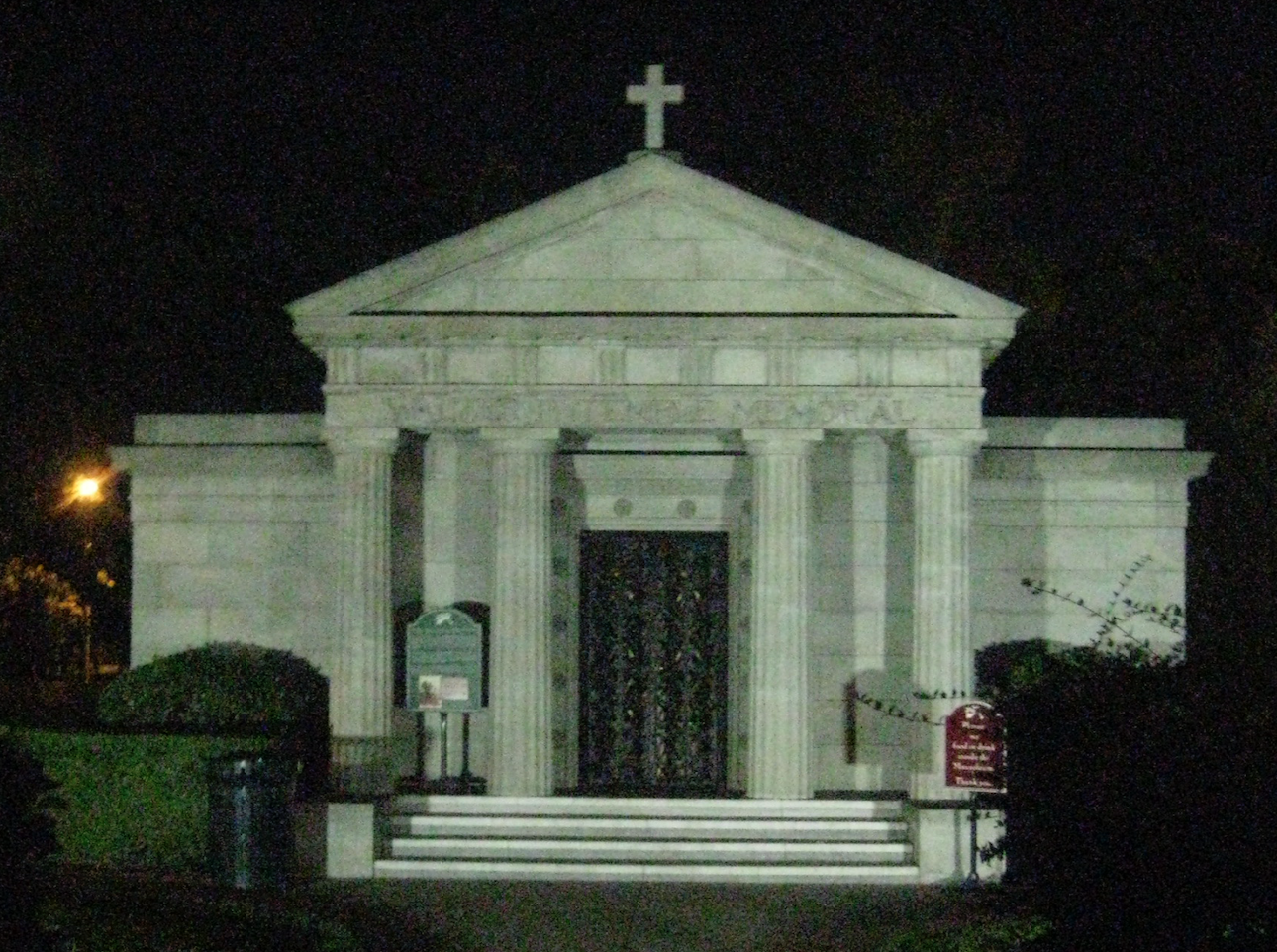
El Campo Santo mausoleum.

The cemetery remained in use during the occupancy of the Temple family in the 1920s and during that of the Brown family from 1940 to 1981. In recent years there have been three burials. Walter P. Temple was relocated to the site in 2002 from Mission San Gabriel, where he was buried in 1938 after the cemetery's owner, California Bank, refused the Temples' request to have him buried there. Temple's son, Walter Jr., the last member of the family to have lived at the Homestead, and daughter-in-law, Nellie Didier, were buried in the cemetery in 1998. A spot is reserved for their daughter, after which the cemetery will cease being in active use.

== Public access to the Homestead Museum ==
The museum, opened 1 May 1981, is owned and fully funded by the City of Industry and its management is contracted to Historical Resources, Inc., owned by museum director Paul R. Spitzzeri. Guided public tours of the Workman Home, 'La Casa Nueva' , and El Campo Santo Cemetery at the Homestead Museum are available on the hour from 1 to 4 p.m. Wednesday through Sunday, excepting major holidays. The museum also maintains a full schedule of festivals, weekend living history tours, behind-the-scenes tours, workshops and other events throughout the year.

== California Historic Landmark Marker ==
California Historic Landmark Marker on the site reads:

- NO. 874 WORKMAN HOME AND FAMILY CEMETERY - William Workman and John Rowland organized the first wagon train of permanent eastern settlers, which arrived in Southern California on November 5, 1841. Together they owned and developed the 48,790-acre La Puente Rancho. Workman began this adobe home in 1842 and remodeled it in 1872 to resemble a manor house in his native England. He also established 'El Campo Santo,' this region's earliest known private family cemetery, in 1850, the miniature Classic Grecian mausoleum was built in 1919 by grandson Walter P. Temple.

== Gallery of photographs from Homestead Museum ==
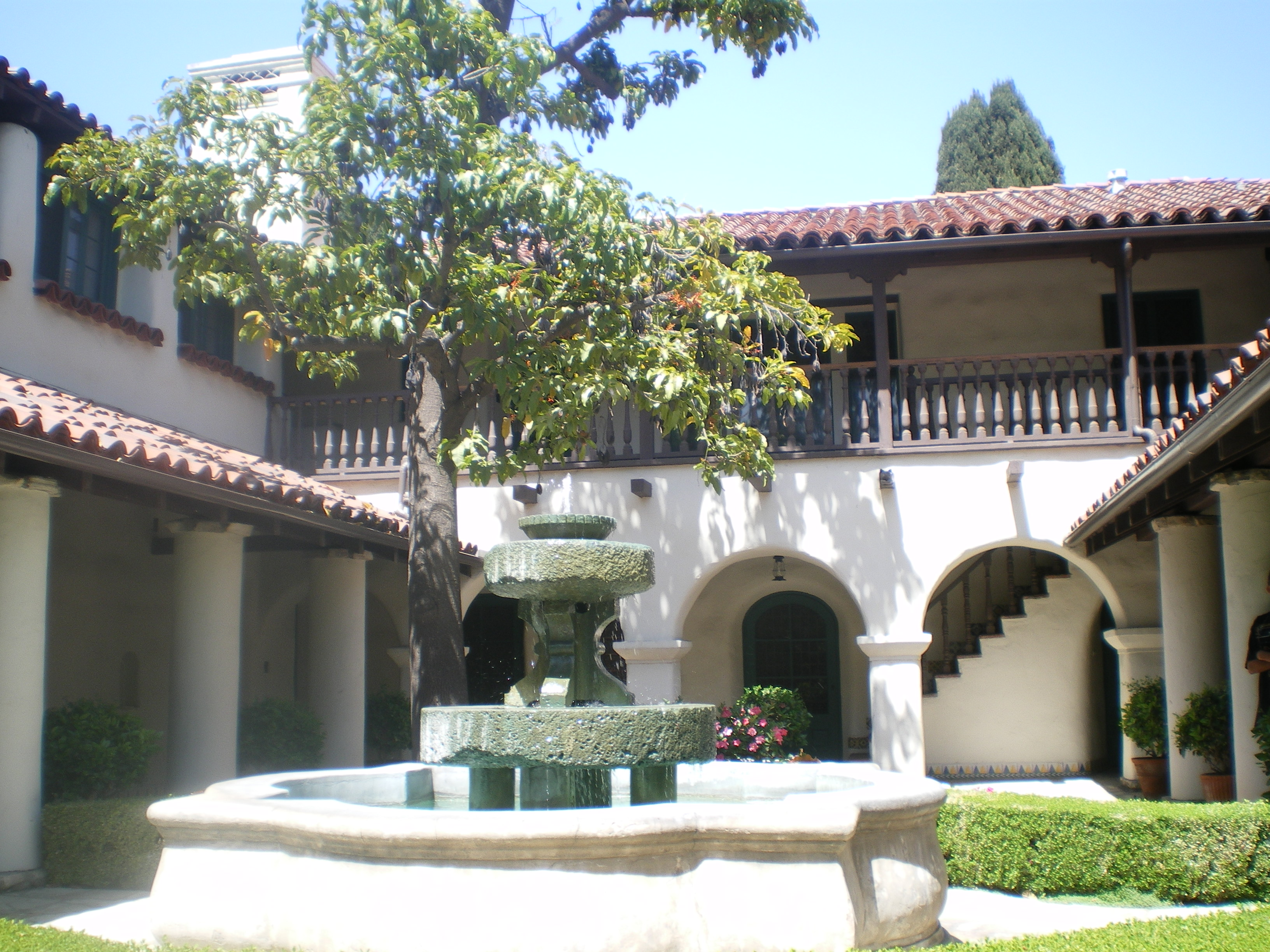
Temple Mansion

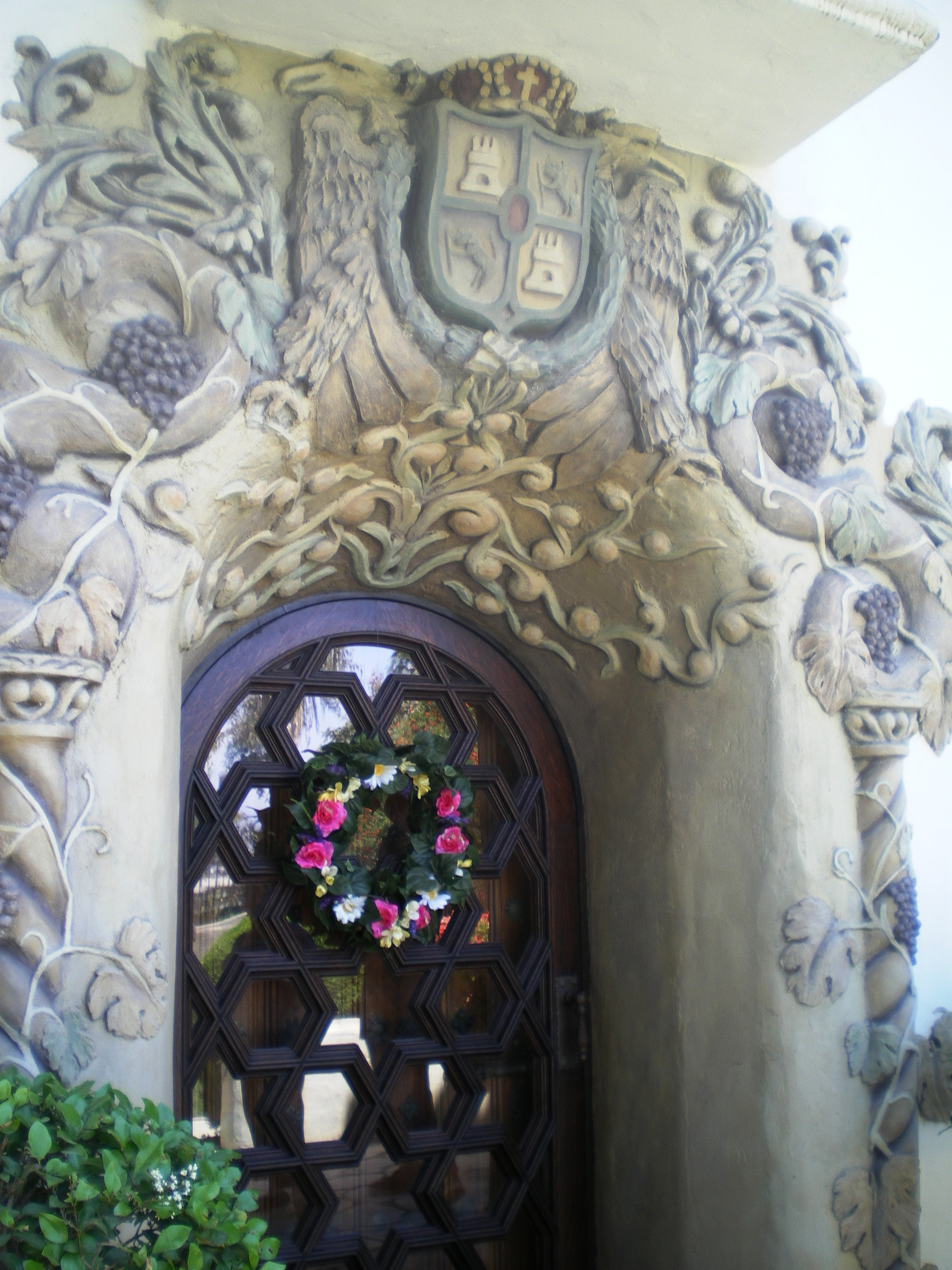
Entrance to La Casa Nueva

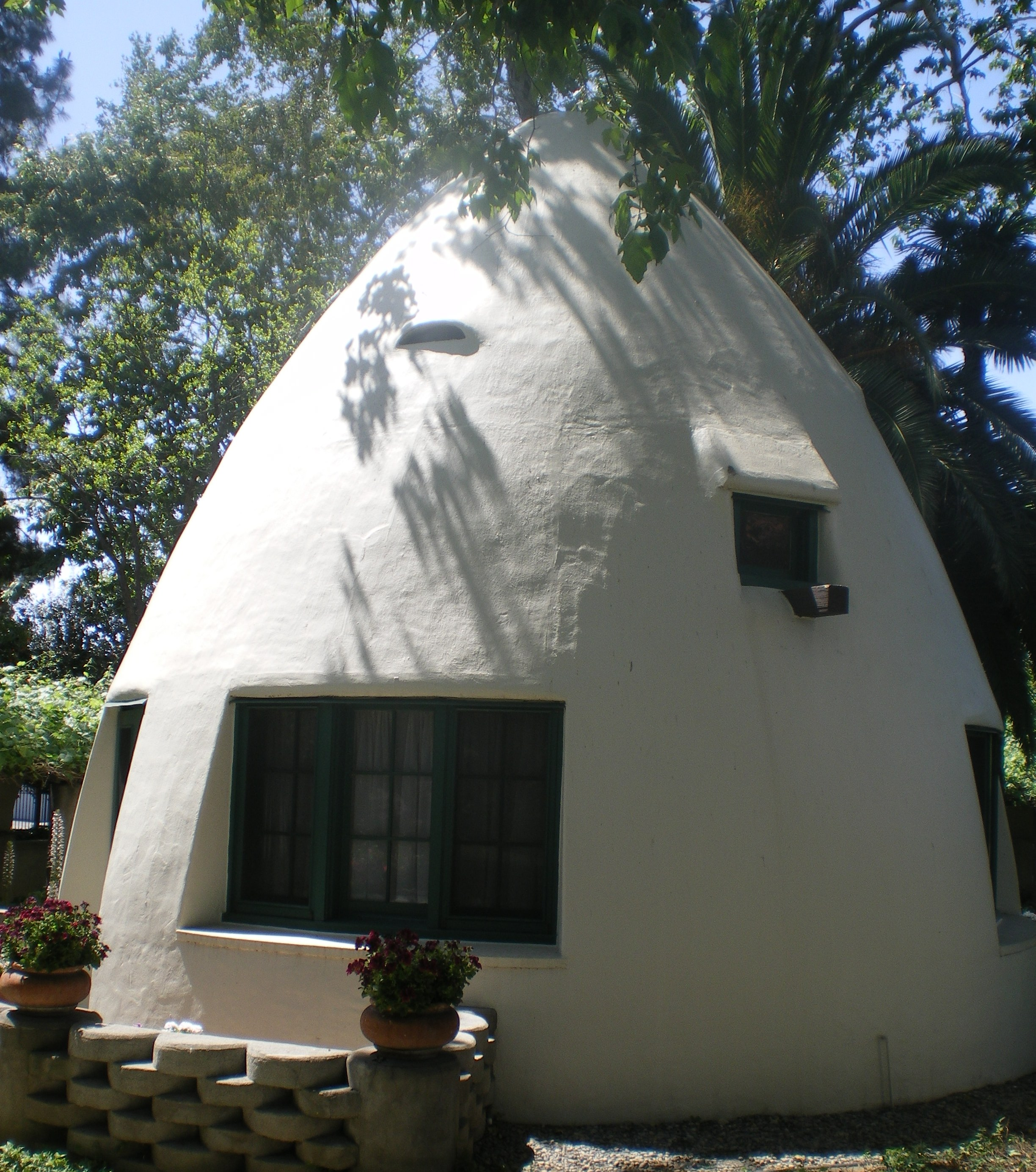
"Tepee" at La Casa Nueva
