= Rancho La Merced =

Mexican land grant in California

Coordinates: 34.030°N 118.100°W

- Land grant of Mexico
- 1844–1872
  - Type: Mexican land grant
- History
  - Established: 1844
  - Disestablished: 1872
- Today part of: United States

Rancho La Merced was a 2,363-acre (9.56 km^{2}) Mexican land grant in present day Los Angeles County, California, given in 1844 by Governor Manuel Micheltorena to Casilda Soto de Lobo. The name means "Mercy of God". The northwest section of Montebello and the southeastern part of Monterey Park now occupy the area of what was Rancho La Merced.

== History ==
Governor Micheltorena granted Rancho La Merced to Casilda Soto de Lobo in 1844. Casilda Soto de Lobo was the widow of a soldier assigned to the San Gabriel Mission. In 1850, William Workman foreclosed on the $2500 loan he had made to Casilda Soto, who had put up Rancho La Merced as collateral. In 1851, Workman gave his son-in-law, Francisco P. Temple and former ranch foreman, Juan Matias Sanchez, each an undivided half interest in Rancho La Merced.

With the cession of California to the United States following the Mexican–American War, the 1848 Treaty of Guadalupe Hidalgo provided that the land grants would be honored. As required by the Land Act of 1851, a claim for Rancho La Merced was filed with the Public Land Commission in 1853, and the grant was patented to Temple and Sanchez in 1872.

In 1876 the Temple and Workman Bank failed, and Temple and Sanchez, who had mortgaged the property to Elias J. "Lucky" Baldwin, lost their land when Baldwin foreclosed. Distraught and broke, William Workman shot himself in 1876. Temple suffered a stroke that left him partially paralyzed, and died penniless in 1880. Juan Matias Sanchez died in poverty in 1885. The rancho was acquired by Alessandro Repetto, an Italian sheep rancher. Businessman Harris Newmark, along with four others, bought the ranch from Repetto in 1886.

== Historic sites of the Rancho ==
- Juan Matias Sanchez Adobe. The Sanchez Adobe was partially constructed in 1845 by Casilda Soto de Lobo and her three sons. With William Workman's gift in 1851, Juan Matías Sanchez took possession and moved into the adobe house. Sanchez added a wing to the adobe, which was the center of his ranch. After the bank failure in 1876, Sanchez lived in the house and 200 acres (0.81 km^{2}) until his death in 1885. The Montebello Historical Society and the city of Montebello were given the deed to the Juan Matias Sanchez Adobe by Josephine Scott Crocker in 1972.

== See also ==
- Ranchos of California
- List of Ranchos of California
