= Francisco P. Temple =

American politician

Francis "Francisco" Pliny Fisk Temple (February 13, 1822 – April 27, 1880) served on the first Los Angeles County Board of Supervisors in 1852.

== Biography ==
Francis Pliny Fisk (F.P.F) Temple was born in Reading, Massachusetts, the youngest in a family of ten children. He traveled to Alta California, then a Mexican territory, by the way of Cape Horn and arrived in Los Angeles in the summer of 1841. His half-brother John a.k.a. Jonathan Temple, who had established himself in the Pueblo de Los Angeles in 1827, was at the time one of the city's leading merchants. 26 years younger than his half-brother, F.P.F. Temple was born after John had gone to sea and settled in California; the brothers had never met before the younger Temple's arrival in Los Angeles. Between 1841 and 1849, Temple was a clerk in John's store. He was nicknamed "Templito" or "Little Temple" by the locals because of his short height of five feet, four inches (163 cm).

In 1845, Temple married Antonia Margarita Workman (July 26, 1830 – January 24, 1892) the daughter of William Workman and his Taos Native American wife Maria Nicolasa Urioste de Valencia. With Alta California still a Mexican colony, and Antonia a Catholic, Temple had to be baptized into the Catholic faith at the San Gabriel Mission before the marriage, after which his Christian name was localized to "Francisco". He and Antonia had 12 children. In 1851, William Workman gave Temple an undivided half share of Rancho La Merced, located 12 miles (19 km) east of Los Angeles, where he made his home. He planted a vineyard of 30,000 vines, 30 acres (120,000 m²) of fruit trees, and a garden. Temple became involved with real estate and with breeding and selling cattle.

In 1850 Temple was elected Los Angeles city treasurer, and in 1852 he served on the first Los Angeles County Board of Supervisors. In 1856 he had the Temple Block built, which would become the undisputed center of commerce and social life in the town as it housed a saloon, the offices of the town's most prominent lawyers, and some of its best retail clothing stores.

In 1868 Temple, along with father-in-law William Workman and Isaias W. Hellman, formed the banking house of Hellman, Temple & Co. It was the first bank in Los Angeles. Hellman dropped out of the business three years later and the partnership between Temple and Workman continued as the Temple & Workman Bank (located in the Temple Block). In 1875, when nearly every bank in the state closed its doors for a time, the Temple & Workman Bank went bankrupt due to mismanagement. Both men lost everything. Temple never recovered from the financial disaster and Workman committed suicide a year later.

Temple died on April 27, 1880 and is buried in the Workman and Temple family's El Campo Santo Cemetery.

== See also ==
- Workman-Temple family
