= La Puente, California =

City in California, United States

- City
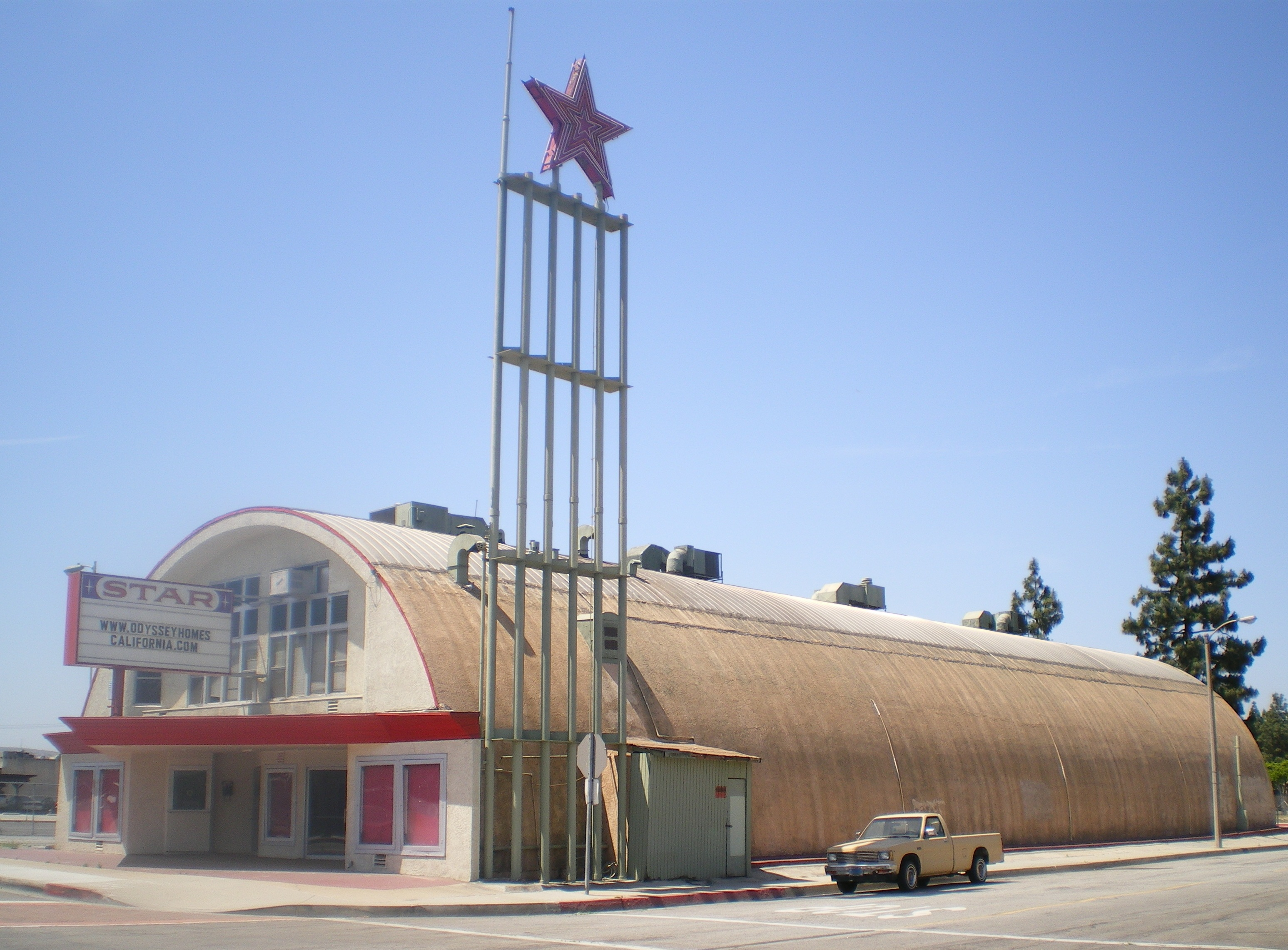
- La Puente's Star Theater in 2008 (demolished in 2019)

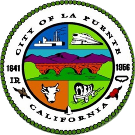
- Seal
- Motto: Where the Past Meets the Future
- Interactive map of La Puente, California
- Location in the United States
- Coordinates: 34°1′57″N 117°57′19″W
- Country: United States
- State: California
- County: Los Angeles
- Incorporated: August 1, 1956

Government
  - Type: Council-Manager
  - Mayor: Valerie Muñoz
  - Mayor Pro Tem: Charlie Klinakis
  - City Council: David E. Argudo; Nadia Mendoza; Gabriel Quiñones
  - City Manager: Bob Lindsey
  - City Treasurer: Troy Grunklee, CPA

Area
  - Total: 3.48 sq mi (9.01 km^{2})
  - Land: 3.48 sq mi (9.01 km^{2})
  - Water: 0 sq mi (0.00 km^{2}) 0.02%
- Elevation: 351 ft (107 m)

Population (2020)
  - Total: 38,062
  - Density: 10,900/sq mi (4,220/km^{2})
- Time zone: UTC-8 (PST)
  - Summer (DST): UTC-7 (PDT)
- ZIP codes: 91744-91749
- Area code: 626
- FIPS code: 06-40340
- GNIS feature IDs: 1660865, 2411581
- Website: www.lapuente.org

La Puente (Spanish for "The Bridge") is a city in the San Gabriel Valley of Los Angeles County, California, United States. The city had a population of 38,062 at the 2020 census and is approximately 15 miles (24 km) east of Los Angeles.

== History ==
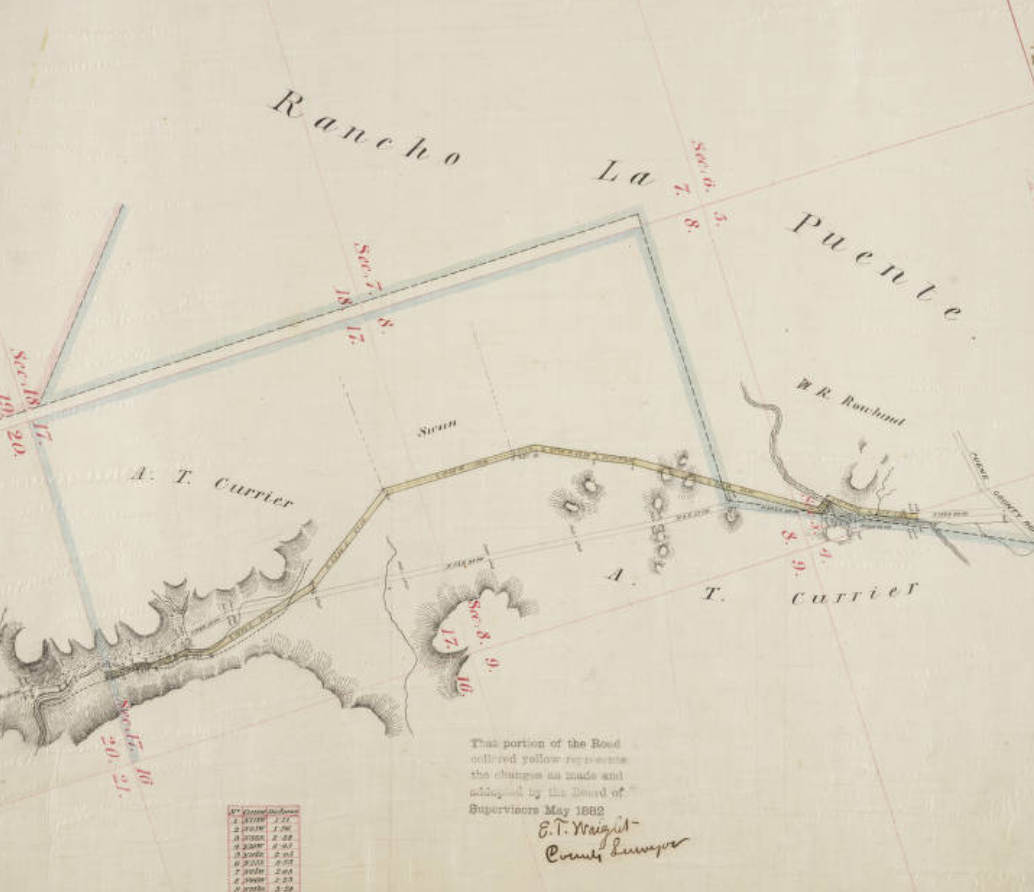
La Puente sits on land that was originally part of Rancho La Puente, a Mexican era rancho granted in 1840. The area had already been named La Puente by Juan Crespí during the 1769 Portolá expedition.

The original inhabitants of the area now occupied by the city of La Puente were the Tongva lived in a village called Awingna, which linguists translate as "abiding place." The Awingna chief Matheo (who also held sway over several other nearby villages) was baptized at Mission San Gabriel in 1774.

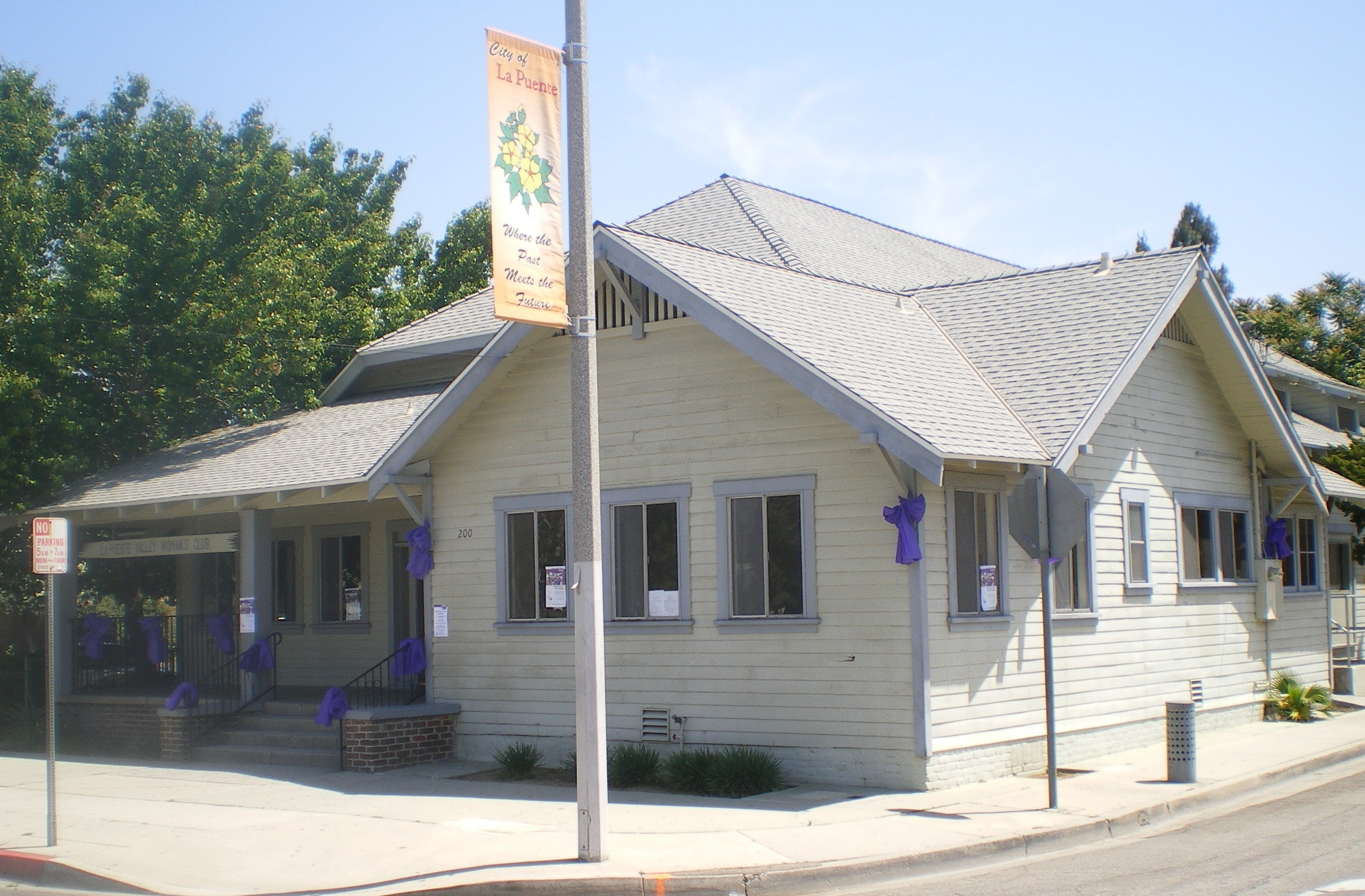
La Puente Valley Women's Club is listed on the National Register of Historic Places.

In 1769, the Spanish Portolá expedition became the first Europeans to see inland portions of Alta California. On July 30, the party camped on the east side of the San Gabriel River, in today's unincorporated area of Bassett. Father Juan Crespi wrote in his diary that, the next day, they had to build a bridge (Spanish "puente") to cross the miry San Gabriel River.

With the establishment of Mission San Gabriel, the area encompassing Awingna and what is now the city of La Puente became part of Rancho La Puente, established as a mission outpost and ranch. The rancho was visited by the Jedediah Smith party in November 1826, the first Americans to travel overland to California.

Following secularization of the missions in the 1830s, former mission ranchos passed into private ownership. In 1842, John Rowland and William Workman were granted the 48,000-acre (190 km^{2}) Rancho La Puente. In 1884, the area was named Puente (bridge in Spanish; in old Spanish the noun was often feminine, as opposed to modern Spanish el puente). In Crespi's diary, it was written as "la puente", and that spelling has persisted.

The area was known for its fruit and walnut groves during the 1930s. The city was even home to the world's largest walnut packing plant. A small airport called the 'Skyranch' operated in La Puente from 1944 to 1951 before it was closed and developed for housing. Today, the city is heavily urbanized, but the area still has some historical landmarks from its founding days nearby, for instance, the Workman and Temple Family Homestead Museum in neighboring City of Industry.

Redevelopment of the business districts in La Puente have been ongoing. However, the local government has been relatively unsuccessful in its attempts to attract big-box retailers and restaurant chains. La Puente retains many aging 1950s-era strip malls.

== Geography ==
La Puente is located at 34°1′57″N 117°57′19″W (34.032410, -117.955195). The city, which is mostly flat, covers about 3.5 square miles (9.1 km^{2}) of land in the San Gabriel Valley.

== Demographics ==
Historical population
Census	Pop.	Note	%±
1960	24,723		—
1970	31,092		25.8%
1980	30,882		−0.7%
1990	36,955		19.7%
2000	41,063		11.1%
2010	39,816		−3.0%
2020	38,062		−4.4%
U.S. Decennial Census; 1860–1870 1880-1890; 1900 1910 1920; 1930 1940 1950; 1960 1970 1980; 1990 2000 2010; 2020

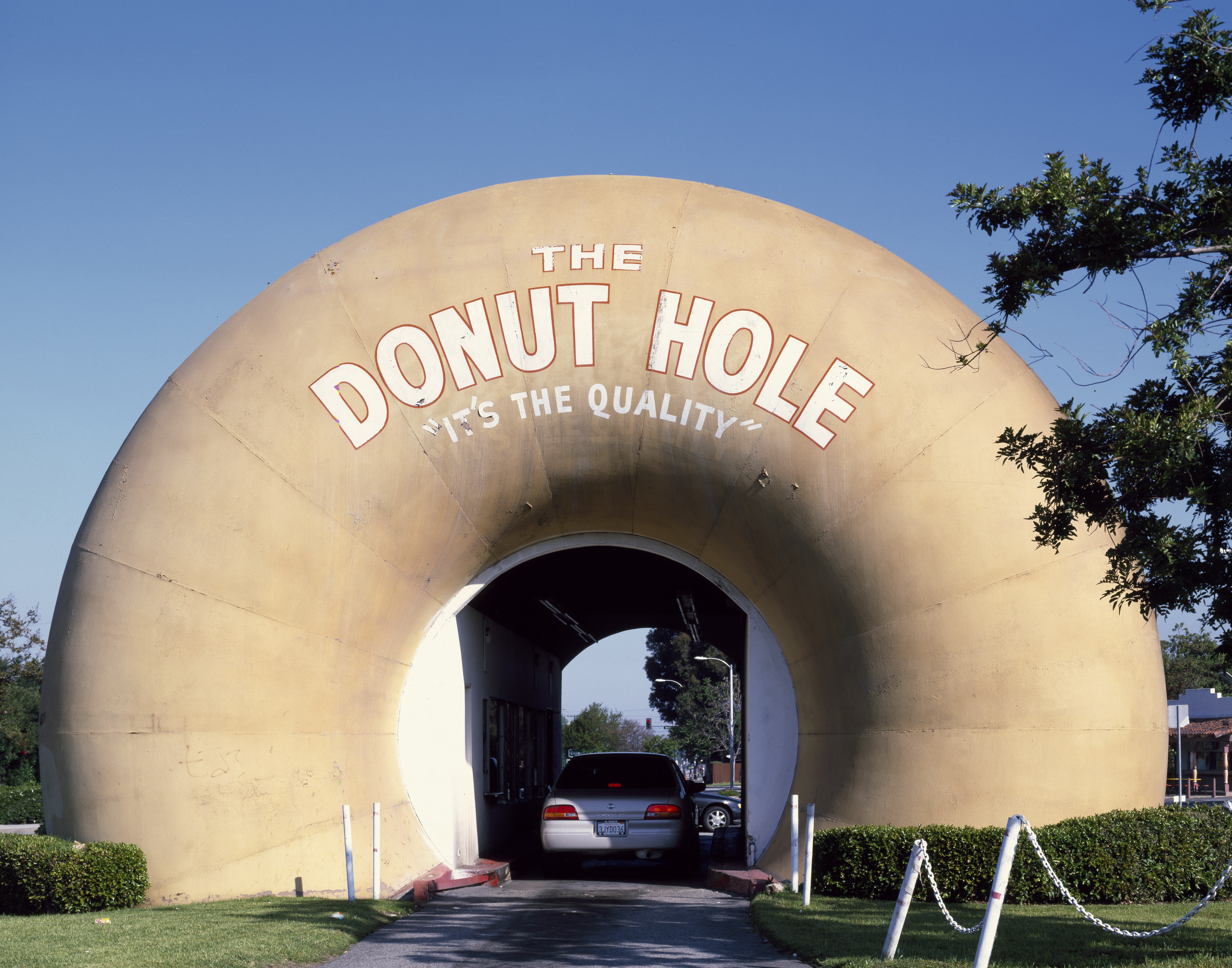
The Donut Hole

La Puente first appeared as a city in the 1960 U.S. census as part of the East San Gabriel Valley census county division. Prior to 1960, the area was part of the unincorporated portion of the now-defunct El Monte Township.

=== Racial and ethnic composition ===
La Puente city, California – Racial and ethnic composition Note: the US Census treats Hispanic/Latino as an ethnic category. This table excludes Latinos from the racial categories and assigns them to a separate category. Hispanics/Latinos may be of any race.
Race / Ethnicity (NH = Non-Hispanic)	Pop 1980	Pop 1990	Pop 2000	Pop 2010	Pop 2020	% 1980	% 1990	% 2000	% 2010	% 2020
White alone (NH)	9,465	5,350	2,749	1,835	1,257	30.65%	14.48%	6.69%	4.61%	3.30%
Black or African American alone (NH)	1,026	1,133	688	451	386	3.32%	3.07%	1.68%	1.13%	1.01%
Native American or Alaska Native alone (NH)	167	111	139	75	44	0.54%	0.30%	0.34%	0.19%	0.12%
Asian alone (NH)	733	2,641	2,865	3,270	4,846	2.38%	7.15%	6.98%	8.21%	12.73%
Native Hawaiian or Pacific Islander alone (NH)	733	2,641	40	31	46	2.38%	7.15%	0.10%	0.08%	0.12%
Other race alone (NH)	203	57	48	47	133	0.66%	0.15%	0.12%	0.12%	0.35%
Mixed race or Multiracial (NH)	x	x	412	211	270	x	x	1.00%	0.53%	0.71%
Hispanic or Latino (any race)	19,288	27,663	34,122	33,896	31,080	62.46%	74.86%	83.10%	85.13%	81.66%
Total	30,882	36,955	41,063	39,816	38,062	100.00%	100.00%	100.00%	100.00%	100.00%

=== 2020 census ===
As of the 2020 census, La Puente had a population of 38,062 and a population density of 10,940.5 inhabitants per square mile (4,224.2/km^{2}). The median age was 36.0 years, with 23.0% of residents under age 18 and 13.0% aged 65 or older. For every 100 females, there were 97.0 males, and for every 100 females age 18 and over, there were 95.3 males.

The census reported that 37,986 people (99.8%) lived in households, 76 people (0.2%) lived in non-institutionalized group quarters, and no one was institutionalized. There were 9,703 households, of which 45.9% had children under the age of 18. Of all households, 51.6% were married-couple households, 15.2% had a male householder with no spouse or partner present, and 26.4% had a female householder with no spouse or partner present. About 11.3% of households were one person, and 5.2% had someone living alone who was 65 years of age or older. The average household size was 3.92. There were 8,139 families (83.9% of all households).

There were 9,919 housing units at an average density of 2,851.1 units per square mile (1,100.8 units/km^{2}), of which 9,703 (97.8%) were occupied. Of these, 58.5% were owner-occupied and 41.5% were occupied by renters. The remaining 2.2% were vacant; the homeowner vacancy rate was 0.3% and the rental vacancy rate was 2.2%.

100.0% of residents lived in urban areas, while 0.0% lived in rural areas.

=== 2023 ACS 5-year estimate ===
In 2023, the US Census Bureau estimated that the median household income was $84,811, and the per capita income was $26,501. About 8.1% of families and 9.9% of the population were below the poverty line.

=== 2010 census ===
The 2010 United States census reported that La Puente had a population of 39,816. The population density was 11,443.2 inhabitants per square mile (4,418.2/km^{2}). La Puente is 49.4% White (4.6% Non-Hispanic White), 1.4% Black or African American, 1.1% Native American, 8.4% Asian, and 0.1% Pacific Islander. Hispanic or Latino of any race were 33,896 persons (85.1%).

The Census reported that 39,773 people (99.9% of the population) lived in households, 43 (0.1%) lived in non-institutionalized group quarters, and 0 (0%) were institutionalized.

There were 9,451 households, out of which 5,186 (54.9%) had children under the age of 18 living in them, 5,367 (56.8%) were opposite-sex married couples living together, 1,824 (19.3%) had a female householder with no husband present, 930 (9.8%) had a male householder with no wife present. There were 584 (6.2%) unmarried opposite-sex partnerships, and 65 (0.7%) same-sex married couples or partnerships. 989 households (10.5%) were made up of individuals, and 472 (5.0%) had someone living alone who was 65 years of age or older. The average household size was 4.21. There were 8,121 families (85.9% of all households); the average family size was 4.34.

The population was spread out, with 11,423 people (28.7%) under the age of 18, 4,640 people (11.7%) aged 18 to 24, 11,468 people (28.8%) aged 25 to 44, 8,619 people (21.6%) aged 45 to 64, and 3,666 people (9.2%) who were 65 years of age or older. The median age was 31.5 years. For every 100 females, there were 99.7 males. For every 100 females age 18 and over, there were 97.8 males.

There were 9,761 housing units at an average density of 2,805.3 per square mile (1,083.1/km^{2}), of which 5,693 (60.2%) were owner-occupied, and 3,758 (39.8%) were occupied by renters. The homeowner vacancy rate was 1.0%; the rental vacancy rate was 3.9%. 24,961 people (62.7% of the population) lived in owner-occupied housing units and 14,812 people (37.2%) lived in rental housing units.

According to the 2010 United States census, La Puente had a median household income of $53,794, with 14.3% of the population living below the federal poverty line.

== Government ==
In the California State Legislature, La Puente is in the 30th senatorial district, represented by Democrat Bob Archuleta, and in the 56th Assembly district, represented by Democrat Lisa Calderon.

In the United States House of Representatives, La Puente is in California's 31st congressional district, represented by Democrat Gil Cisneros.

== Infrastructure ==
The Los Angeles County Sheriff's Department operates the Industry Station in the City of Industry, serving La Puente.

The Los Angeles County Department of Health Services operates the Pomona Health Center in Pomona, serving La Puente.

The city is served by Los Angeles County Fire Department Battalion 12's Fire Stations 26 and 43.

== Economy ==
The income per capita of the city of La Puente is $16,899, which includes all children and adults. The city's median household income is $62,709.

=== Top employers ===
According to the city's Annual Budget for FY2020–21, the top employers in the city are:

Rank	Employer	No. of employees
1	Northgate González Markets	120
2	Bodega Latina Corp (El Super)	111
3	Alert Insulation Co., Inc.	88
4	Walmart	80
5	Food 4 Less	75
6	McDonald's	68
7	Big Saver Foods	60
8	Ed Butts Ford	59
9	Ross Dress for Less	46
10	El Sushi Loco	43

== Education ==
School districts include:

- Hacienda La Puente Unified School District
- Bassett Unified School District
- Rowland Unified School District

Elementary (primary) schools: Lasallette Elementary School, Temple Academy (Closed starting 2021-22), Baldwin Academy, Nelson Elementary School, Sparks Elementary School, California Elementary School, Sunkist Elementary School, Del Valle Elementary School, Northam Elementary School

Private (primary) schools: Saint Joseph School, Saint Louis of France, Saint Martha's Catholic School

High (secondary) schools: Bassett High School, La Puente High School, Nogales High School, William Workman High School (in the City of Industry)

Private high schools: Bishop Amat Memorial High School

== Notable people ==
- Alfie Agnew – mathematician, songwriter and musician
- Sutan Amrull – make-up artist and performer
- Tony Baltazar – professional boxer (former resident)
- Eric Bieniemy – University of Colorado Boulder and NFL running back, attended Bishop Amat HS
- Anthony Calvillo – record-breaking Canadian Football League quarterback
- David Denson – first professional baseball player affiliated with an MLB organization to come out as gay
- Cecil Fielder – former Nogales HS and Detroit Tigers slugger, father of Prince Fielder
- Jeff Garcia – stand-up comedian and voice actor; voice for the character Sheen Estevez in The Adventures of Jimmy Neutron, Boy Genius
- Norberto Garrido – lineman for the NFL's Carolina Panthers
- Pat Haden – former USC and NFL quarterback, attended Bishop Amat HS
- Dan Haren – MLB pitcher, attended Bishop Amat HS
- Efren Herrera – UCLA and NFL kicker, attended La Puente HS
- Padma Lakshmi – Indian American author, activist, model, and television host.
- Mike Lamb – MLB infielder, attended Bishop Amat HS
- Billy Laughlin – "Froggy" from the Our Gang comedies
- Darryll Lewis – University of Arizona and NFL cornerback, attended Nogales HS
- Steven Luevano – professional boxer
- Kid Congo Powers – musician who has played in bands such as The Cramps, The Gun Club and Nick Cave and the Bad Seeds
- Lionel Manuel – University of the Pacific and NFL wide receiver, attended Bassett HS
- Arturo Marquez – composer of orchestra music (former resident)
- Crispin Castro Monroy – municipal president of Santa Cruz Atizapán
- Max Montoya – UCLA and NFL offensive lineman, attended La Puente HS
- Ruben Ramos Jr – soccer player
- D'Angelo Ross – NFL cornerback
- William R. Rowland – eleventh Los Angeles County Sheriff, major La Puente landowner
- Kelly Seyarto - Firefighter and politician. Former mayor of Murrieta, California. Member of the California State Senate from the District 32. Born in La Puente.
- John Sciarra – UCLA and NFL quarterback, attended Bishop Amat HS
- Hilda Solis – politician, member of Los Angeles County Board of Supervisors for the First District
- Eric Winter – actor, model
- Michael Young – MLB 7-time All-Star infielder, attended Bishop Amat HS
