= Norberto Davidds-Garrido =

American football player (born 1972)

No. 76, 64
- Position: Offensive tackle

Personal information
- Born: October 4, 1972 (age 54); La Puente, California, U.S.
- Listed height: 6 ft 6 in (1.98 m)
- Listed weight: 336 lb (152 kg)

Career information
- High school: Workman (Industry, California)
- College: USC
- NFL draft: 1996: 4th round, 108th overall pick

Career history
- Carolina Panthers (1996–1999); Arizona Cardinals (2000–2001)

Career NFL statistics
- Games played: 68
- Games started: 41
- Fumble recoveries: 1
- Stats at Pro Football Reference

Norberto Davidds-Garrido Jr. (born October 4, 1972) is an American former professional football player who was an offensive lineman in the National Football League (NFL). He played college football for the USC Trojans.

== Early life ==
Garrido prepped at William Workman High School in City of Industry, California.

== College career ==
Garrido graduated from the University of Southern California, where he was also a member of the Delta Chi fraternity, after transferring from Mount San Antonio College.

== Professional career ==
Garrido was selected with the 106th pick in the fourth round of the 1996 NFL draft by the Carolina Panthers. He played with them until 1999. In 2000, he played for the Arizona Cardinals.
