= List of largest biomedical companies by revenue =

The following is a list of independent pharmaceutical, biotechnology and medical companies listed on a stock exchange (as indicated) that have generated a revenue of at least US$10 billion, ranked by their revenue in the respective financial year.

It does not include biotechnology companies that are now owned by, or form a part of, larger pharmaceutical groups.

== Ranking by revenue ==
The following table lists the largest biotechnology and pharmaceutical companies ranked by revenue in billion USD. The change column indicates the company's relative position in this list compared to its relative position in the preceding year; i.e., an increase would be moving closer to rank 1 and vice versa. Green cells indicate years where revenue increased compared to the preceding year. Red cells indicate those years when there has been a decrease.

Largest biotechnology and pharmaceutical companies ranked by revenue in billion USD.
Rank	Chg	Company	Country	Traded on	2025	2024	2023	2022	2021	2020	2019	2018	2017	2016
1	Steady	Johnson & Johnson	USA	NYSE: JNJ	94.19	88.82	85.16	79.99	93.78	82.59	82.06	81.60	76.50	71.89
2	Steady	Sinopharm	CHN	SEHK: 1099	81.31	83.64	84.06	80.19	75.68	71.75	60.18	48.75	43.63	36.56
3	Steady	Roche	SUI	SIX: ROG	80.31	66.42	68.48	69.77	67.83	62.99	63.85	56.86	57.37	50.11
4	▲7	Eli Lilly & Co	USA	NYSE: LLY	65.18	45.03	34.12	28.54	28.32	24.54	22.32	21.49	22.90	21.22
5	▼1	Merck & Co.	USA	NYSE: MRK	65.01	64.17	60.12	59.28	48.70	41.52	46.84	42.30	40.10	39.80
6	▼1	Pfizer	USA	NYSE: PFE	62.58	63.63	59.55	100.33	81.29	41.91	41.17	40.83	52.54	52.82
7	▼1	AbbVie	USA	NYSE: ABBV	61.16	56.33	54.32	58.05	56.20	45.80	33.27	32.75	28.22	25.56
8	▼1	AstraZeneca	GBR; SWE	LSE: AZN	58.74	54.07	45.81	44.35	37.42	26.62	24.38	22.09	22.47	23.00
9	Steady	Novartis	SUI	NYSE: NVS	54.53	50.32	45.44	50.55	51.63	48.66	47.45	44.75	49.11	48.52
10	▲2	Sanofi	FRA	NYSE: SNY	52.15	42.68	46.84	46.86	43.24	41.27	39.28	39.07	42.91	36.57
11	▼3	Bayer	GER	FWB: BAYN	49.56	51.07	51.72	53.88	49.46	47.40	48.02	45.06	37.94	25.27
12	▲2	Novo	DEN	NYSE: NVO	48.86	40.52	33.83	25.46	21.66	19.52	18.30	6.99	18.77	16.61
13	▼3	Bristol Myers Squibb	USA	Nasdaq: BMY	48.19	48.30	45.01	46.16	46.39	42.52	26.15	22.56	20.80	19.43
14	▲1	GlaxoSmithKline	GBR	LSE: GSK	44.59	39.28	38.63	36.14	46.91	46.17	43.92	43.14	42.05	34.79
15	▼2	Abbott Laboratories	USA	Nasdaq: ABT	44.33	41.95	40.11	43.65	43.08	34.61	31.90	30.60	27.39	20.85
16	Steady	Shanghai Pharmaceuticals	CHN	SSE: 601607	39.40	38.65	36.68	32.33	31.82	29.29	27.50	23.45	19.28	17.80
17	Steady	Amgen	USA	Nasdaq: AMGN	36.75	33.42	28.19	26.32	25.98	25.42	23.40	23.70	22.80	22.99
18	Steady	Boehringer Ingelheim	GER	Private		29.37	27.70	25.90	22.50	22.40	21.75	21.67	17.54	16.41
19	Steady	Takeda Pharmaceutical	JPN	TYO: 4502		29.31	30.24	30.34	29.31	27.76	31.17	19.10	16.70	15.96
20	Steady	Gilead Sciences	USA	Nasdaq: GILD	29.44	28.75	27.12	27.28	27.31	24.69	22.45	22.13	25.70	30.39
21	Steady	Siemens Healthineers	GER	FWB: SHL		23.21	23.32	23.09	20.61	16.56	16.62	15.37	16.56	14.25
22	Steady	Merck Group	GER	ETR: MRK		23.18	22.79	23.64	21.40	20.08	18.25	16.48	18.70	16.62
23	Steady	Jointown Pharmaceutical	CHN	SSE: 600998		21.32	21.15	19.81	18.04	16.34	14.67	12.85	10.90	9.07
24	Steady	GE Healthcare	USA	Nasdaq: GEHC	20.63	19.67	19.55	18.34	17.73	18.01	19.94	19.78	19.02	18.21
25	Steady	Teva Pharmaceuticals	ISR	Nasdaq: TEVA	17.26	16.54	15.85	14.93	15.88	16.66	16.89	18.90	22.40	21.90
26	Steady	Otsuka Holdings	JPN	TYO: 4578		15.78	14.23	13.05	11.65	11.06	10.85	10.04	9.64	9.29
27	Steady	Kenvue	USA	NYSE: KVUE	15.12	15.46	15.44	14.95						
28	▲2	Haleon	GBR	LSE: HLN	15.01	14.15	14.29	13.14	11.77					
29	Steady	Regeneron Pharmaceuticals	USA	Nasdaq: REGN	14.34	14.20	13.12	12.17	16.07	8.50	7.86	6.71	5.87	4.86
30	▼2	Viatris	USA	Nasdaq: VTRS	14.30	14.69	15.43	16.22	17.81	11.95				
31	Steady	Astellas Pharma	JPN	TYO: 4503		12.68	10.54	10.87	10.08	10.85	11.29	12.27	12.07	12.63
32	Steady	Daiichi Sankyo	JPN	TYO: 4568		12.51	10.52	8.40	6.87	6.33	6.45	6.11	6.31	6.28
33	Steady	Vertex Pharmaceuticals	USA	Nasdaq: VRTX	12.00	11.02	9.87	8.93	7.57	6.20	4.16	3.04	2.16	1.68
34	Steady	Baxter International	USA	NYSE: BAX	11.24	10.64	14.81	15.11	12.78	11.63	11.36	11.13	10.56	10.16

== See also ==
- List of largest biomedical companies by market capitalization
