= Los Altos High School =

There are two high schools in California sharing the name Los Altos:

- Los Altos High School (Hacienda Heights, California)
- Los Altos High School (Los Altos, California)
