= Utility trailer =

Utility Trailer may refer to:

- Trailer (vehicle), an unpowered vehicle pulled by a powered vehicle
- Utility Trailer Manufacturing Company, an American semi-trailer manufacturer
