= Valinda, California =

- census-designated place
- Interactive map of Valinda, California
- Location in the United States
- Coordinates: 34°2′16″N 117°55′44″W
- Country: United States
- State: California
- County: Los Angeles

Area
  - Total: 2.013 sq mi (5.214 km^{2})
  - Land: 2.013 sq mi (5.214 km^{2})
  - Water: 0 sq mi (0 km^{2}) 0%
- Elevation: 348 ft (106 m)

Population (2020)
  - Total: 22,437
  - Density: 11,150/sq mi (4,303/km^{2})
- Time zone: UTC-8 (PST)
  - Summer (DST): UTC-7 (PDT)
- ZIP code: 91744
- Area code: 626
- FIPS code: 06-81638
- GNIS feature ID: 1661610

Valinda is a census-designated place (CDP) in the San Gabriel Valley, in Los Angeles County, California, United States. At the 2020 census, the population was 22,437, down from 22,822 at the 2010 census.

== Geography ==
Valinda is located at 34°2′16″N 117°55′44″W (34.037760, -117.928939).

According to the United States Census Bureau, the CDP has a total area of 2.0 square miles (5.2 km^{2}), all land.

== Demographics ==
Historical population
Census	Pop.	Note	%±
1970	18,837		—
1980	18,700		−0.7%
1990	18,735		0.2%
2000	21,776		16.2%
2010	22,822		4.8%
2020	22,437		−1.7%
U.S. Decennial Census; 1860–1870 1880-1890; 1900 1910 1920; 1930 1940 1950; 1960 1970 1980; 1990 2000 2010; 2020

Valinda first appeared as an unincorporated place in the 1970 U.S. census as part of the East San Gabriel Valley census county division; and as a census designated place in the 1980 United States census.

=== Racial and ethnic composition ===
Valinda CDP, California – Racial and ethnic composition Note: the US Census treats Hispanic/Latino as an ethnic category. This table excludes Latinos from the racial categories and assigns them to a separate category. Hispanics/Latinos may be of any race.
Race / Ethnicity (NH = Non-Hispanic)	Pop 2000	Pop 2010	Pop 2020	% 2000	% 2010	% 2020
White alone (NH)	2,522	1,597	1,117	11.58%	7.00%	4.98%
Black or African American alone (NH)	508	356	281	2.33%	1.56%	1.25%
Native American or Alaska Native alone (NH)	62	40	47	0.28%	0.18%	0.21%
Asian alone (NH)	1,999	2,627	3,815	9.18%	11.51%	17.00%
Native Hawaiian or Pacific Islander alone (NH)	35	35	44	0.16%	0.15%	0.20%
Other race alone (NH)	50	39	85	0.23%	0.17%	0.38%
Mixed race or Multiracial (NH)	329	151	201	1.51%	0.66%	0.90%
Hispanic or Latino (any race)	16,271	17,977	16,847	74.72%	78.77%	75.09%
Total	21,776	22,822	22,437	100.00%	100.00%	100.00%

=== 2020 census ===
As of the 2020 census, Valinda had a population of 22,437 and a population density of 11,146.1 inhabitants per square mile (4,303.5/km^{2}). The racial makeup was 16.3% White, 1.5% African American, 2.1% Native American, 17.4% Asian, 0.2% Pacific Islander, 42.2% from other races, and 20.4% from two or more races. Hispanic or Latino of any race were 75.1% of the population.

100.0% of residents lived in urban areas, while none lived in rural areas. The census reported that 99.7% of the population lived in households, 0.3% lived in non-institutionalized group quarters, and 0.0% were institutionalized.

There were 5,193 households, of which 46.1% had children under the age of 18 living in them. Of all households, 56.2% were married-couple households, 6.0% were cohabiting couple households, 14.1% were households with a male householder and no spouse or partner present, and 23.7% were households with a female householder and no spouse or partner present. About 9.0% of all households were made up of individuals and 4.5% had someone living alone who was 65 years of age or older. The average household size was 4.31, and 4,502 households (86.7% of all households) were families.

The age distribution was 22.4% under the age of 18, 10.9% aged 18 to 24, 27.9% aged 25 to 44, 25.7% aged 45 to 64, and 13.1% who were 65 years of age or older. The median age was 36.0 years. For every 100 females there were 97.5 males, and for every 100 females age 18 and over there were 95.8 males.

There were 5,290 housing units at an average density of 2,627.9 units per square mile (1,014.6 units/km^{2}), of which 5,193 (98.2%) were occupied. Of these, 72.9% were owner-occupied and 27.1% were occupied by renters. The homeowner vacancy rate was 0.5%, and the rental vacancy rate was 0.6%.

Racial composition as of the 2020 census
Race	Number	Percent
White	3,653	16.3%
Black or African American	331	1.5%
American Indian and Alaska Native	467	2.1%
Asian	3,893	17.4%
Native Hawaiian and Other Pacific Islander	49	0.2%
Some other race	9,472	42.2%
Two or more races	4,572	20.4%
Hispanic or Latino (of any race)	16,847	75.1%

=== 2010 census ===
At the 2010 census Valinda had a population of 22,822. The population density was 11,330.9 inhabitants per square mile (4,374.9/km^{2}). The racial makeup of Valinda was 11,058 (48.5%) White (7.0% Non-Hispanic White), 439 (1.9%) African American, 240 (1.1%) Native American, 2,718 (11.9%) Asian, 42 (0.2%) Pacific Islander, 7,530 (33.0%) from other races, and 795 (3.5%) from two or more races. Hispanic or Latino of any race were 17,977 persons (78.8%).

The census reported that 22,733 people (99.6% of the population) lived in households, 83 (0.4%) lived in non-institutionalized group quarters, and 6 (0%) were institutionalized.

There were 4,927 households, 2,852 (57.9%) had children under the age of 18 living in them, 3,100 (62.9%) were opposite-sex married couples living together, 814 (16.5%) had a female householder with no husband present, 479 (9.7%) had a male householder with no wife present. There were 243 (4.9%) unmarried opposite-sex partnerships, and 31 (0.6%) same-sex married couples or partnerships. 375 households (7.6%) were one person and 183 (3.7%) had someone living alone who was 65 or older. The average household size was 4.61. There were 4,393 families (89.2% of households); the average family size was 4.63.

The age distribution was 6,672 people (29.2%) under the age of 18, 2,651 people (11.6%) aged 18 to 24, 6,320 people (27.7%) aged 25 to 44, 5,191 people (22.7%) aged 45 to 64, and 1,988 people (8.7%) who were 65 or older. The median age was 31.7 years. For every 100 females, there were 100.5 males. For every 100 females age 18 and over, there were 98.1 males.

There were 5,071 housing units at an average density of 2,517.7 per square mile, of the occupied units 3,755 (76.2%) were owner-occupied and 1,172 (23.8%) were rented. The homeowner vacancy rate was 0.9%; the rental vacancy rate was 3.3%. 17,054 people (74.7% of the population) lived in owner-occupied housing units and 5,679 people (24.9%) lived in rental housing units.

According to the 2010 United States Census, Valinda had a median household income of $66,727, with 11.1% of the population living below the federal poverty line.

=== Income ===
In 2023, the US Census Bureau estimated that the median household income was $99,979, and the per capita income was $30,128. About 7.1% of families and 8.8% of the population were below the poverty line.

== Government and infrastructure ==
In the state legislature, Valinda is located in the 30th senatorial district, represented by Democrat Bob Archuleta, and in the 48th Assembly district, represented by Democrat Blanca Rubio. Federally, Valinda is located in California's 31st congressional district, represented by Democrat Gil Cisneros.

The Los Angeles County Sheriff's Department operates the Industry Station in the City of Industry, serving Valinda.

The Los Angeles County Department of Health Services operates the Pomona Health Center in Pomona, serving Valinda.

== Education ==
The majority of the CDP is served by the Hacienda La Puente Unified School District while a portion of Northern Valinda is served by the West Covina Unified School District.
