= La Puente High School =

Location
- 15615 East Nelson Avenue; La Puente, California 91744; United States; 34°01′30″N 117°57′22″W

Information
- Type: Public secondary
- Motto: 'Once A Warrior, Always A Warrior'
- Established: 1915
- School district: Hacienda La Puente Unified School District
- Principal: Dr. Lisa Lopez
- Staff: 44.57 (FTE)
- Grades: 9–12
- Enrollment: 865 (2023–2024)
- Student to teacher ratio: 19.41
- Colors: Black; White; Orange
- Athletics conference: CIF Southern Section; Miramonte League
- Mascot: Warrior
- Rival: Workman High School
- Newspaper: The Tomahawk
- Yearbook: Imagaga
- Website: School website

La Puente High School is a public high school in La Puente, California, located in the San Gabriel Valley, serving grades 9–12. It was established in 1915. It is one of six high schools (including two alternative schools) in the Hacienda La Puente Unified School District. It is a California Distinguished School and about 80% of seniors graduate every year.

The school has a number of small learning communities known as "academies," including the University Academy, Law Enforcement Academy, Business Academy, Multimedia Academy, Science and Engineering Academy, and Performing Arts Academy. The Law Enforcement Academy works in partnership with the Los Angeles County Sheriff's Department to educate students interested in a career in public service.

La Puente High School currently has 1425 students and 63 teachers.

== History ==
The school was built on the Tongva village site of Awigna, which was one of the main villages that supplied Mission San Gabriel with labor during the Spanish mission period. During the construction of the school in 1915, many artifacts from the village were unearthed. These artifacts were put on display at the school for many years. In 2004, it was reported that the whereabouts of these artifacts were unknown.

== Notable alumni ==
- Anthony Calvillo, an All-Star CFL quarterback, formerly playing for the Montreal Alouettes and currently most prolific passer in professional football history
- Jimmy Childs, former professional football wide receiver who played two seasons in the National Football League (NFL) for the St. Louis Cardinals. He played college football at Cal Poly
- George Farmer, former wide receiver in the NFL, played for the Chicago Bears and the Detroit Lions
- Efren Herrera, former All-Pro placekicker in the NFL, played for the Dallas Cowboys and the Seattle Seahawks
- Max Montoya, former Pro Bowl offensive guard in the NFL, played for the Cincinnati Bengals and the Los Angeles Raiders
- Judy Mosley-McAfee, professional basketball player with the Sacramento Monarchs
- Hilda Solis, Los Angeles County Supervisor, former House Representative for the 32nd district and former Secretary of Labor under President Obama
