= Efrén Herrera =

American football player (born 1951)

No. 1
- Position: Placekicker

Personal information
- Born: July 30, 1951 (age 75); Guadalajara, Mexico
- Listed height: 5 ft 9 in (1.75 m)
- Listed weight: 185 lb (84 kg)

Career information
- High school: La Puente (La Puente, California, U.S.)
- College: UCLA
- NFL draft: 1974: 7th round, 169th overall pick

Career history
- Detroit Lions (1974)*; Dallas Cowboys (1974–1977); Seattle Seahawks (1978–1981); Buffalo Bills (1982); Los Angeles Raiders (1983)*; Chicago Blitz (1984)*; Arizona Outlaws (1984)
- * Offseason or practice squad member only

Awards and highlights
- Super Bowl champion (XII); First-team All-Pro (1977); Second-team All-Pro (1976); Pro Bowl (1977); PFWA All-Rookie Team (1974); Second-team All-Pacific-8 (1973)

Career NFL statistics
- Games played: 106
- Field goals: 116 / 171
- Field goal %: 67.8
- Extra points: 256 / 268
- Stats at Pro Football Reference

Efrén Herrera (born July 30, 1951) is a Mexican-American former football player who was a placekicker in the National Football League (NFL). He played college football for the UCLA Bruins and was selected in the seventh round of the 1974 NFL draft. Herrera played in the NFL for the Dallas Cowboys, Seattle Seahawks and Buffalo Bills. He also was a member of the Oklahoma Outlaws in the United States Football League (USFL).

== Early life ==
At age 15, Herrera's family moved to the United States from Guadalajara, Mexico. He attended La Puente High School and practiced soccer with no knowledge about football, until he was spotted kicking a basketball into a soccer goal. He eventually joined the football team, playing as a placekicker and safety. He also lettered in baseball, wrestling and track.

== College career ==
Herrera accepted a football scholarship from the University of California, Los Angeles, where he was a placekicker for the football team and a forward/midfielder for the soccer team.

In 1971, Herrera became a starter and against the University of Washington, he set the school record for made field goals (4) in one game. In the opening game of the 1972 season, he kicked the game-winning field goal, with 20 seconds left, in the 20–17 upset of two-time defending national champion Nebraska. In 1973, he broke the school's PATs attempted (64) and made (61) record. In 1974, he led the nation in kick scoring (84 points).

During Herrera's career, the UCLA Bruins football team regularly finished among the leaders in the nation in scoring, which helped him leave as the school and NCAA career leader in scoring with 368 points (1971–1974). He also set the 7 career records including PATs attempted (127) and made (121).

The UCLA soccer team also made it to the NCAA Finals in 1972 and 1973 while Herrera was a player, losing both years to Saint Louis.

== Professional career ==
=== Detroit Lions ===
Herrera was selected by the Detroit Lions in the seventh round (169th overall) of the 1974 NFL draft. He was also selected in the third round by the Los Angeles Aztecs of the NASL draft. He is distinguished as being the second Mexican born player to be drafted into the National Football League (Tom Fears was the first one). He was waived on September 12.

=== Dallas Cowboys ===
On October 3, 1974, the Dallas Cowboys signed Herrera as a free agent after kicker Toni Fritsch was lost for the season with a knee injury and Mac Percival made two out of eight field goal attempts in the first three games. The next year, he was lost with a knee injury in pre-season and was placed on the injured reserve list.

In 1976, Herrera competed with Fritsch to regain his starting job in pre-season and tied for the league lead in field goal percentage with 78.3%. He also became proficient doing "pooch kicks" (punts from field goal formation).

In 1977, Herrera made 18 out of 29 field goals, 39 extra points (tied for the league lead), was the second leading scorer (93 points) in the NFL, had a career-long 52-yard field goal against the Washington Redskins and tied the league record for most field goals attempted (5) in a game. He was an All-Pro selection and made the 1978 Pro Bowl at the end of the season. He also helped the Cowboys win Super Bowl XII.

On August 14, 1978, Herrera was traded to the Seattle Seahawks in exchange for a fifth-round draft choice (#128-Curtis Anderson), because of a contract holdout. He left with the top career field goal percentage in franchise history (.677). The Cowboys replaced him with Rafael Septién.

=== Seattle Seahawks ===
In 1978, Herrera underwent appendectomy surgery following the 15th game of the season and came back the next week against the Kansas City Chiefs to make a 31-yard field goal and two out of three extra points.

In Seattle, he became a fan favorite as part of a special teams unit that was known for its fake field goal plays, where he had to pass, catch, block and run. In 1979, Herrera recorded a career high 100 points and was third in the league with an 82.6% field goal percentage. The next year, he set club and career records for most field goals in a season (20) and in a game (4).

In 1981, Herrera made a career-long 54-yard field goal. He was placed on the injured reserve list with a knee injury on November 16. He was waived in favor of rookie Norm Johnson on September 8, 1982.

=== Buffalo Bills ===
On September 20, 1982, Herrera was signed by the Buffalo Bills to replace Nick Mike-Mayer during the strike abbreviated season (playing seven of the team's nine games). He was released on July 11, 1983. At the time, Herrera ranked second all-time in career field goal accuracy with 67.8%.

=== Los Angeles Raiders ===
In July 1983, Herrera was signed by the Los Angeles Raiders, but he could not pass Chris Bahr on the depth chart and was cut on August 16.

=== Chicago Blitz (USFL) ===
On January 25, 1984, Herrera was signed by the Chicago Blitz of the United States Football League. He was released on February 24.

=== Oklahoma/Arizona Outlaws (USFL) ===
On March 15, 1984, Herrera signed with the Oklahoma Outlaws of the United States Football League. On December 4, the team merged with the Arizona Wranglers. On January 25, 1985, he was released after the team acquired Luis Zendejas.

== Personal life ==
Herrera is currently an assistant coach at Claremont High School in Claremont, California.
