= List of largest biomedical companies by market capitalization =

The following is a list of independent pharmaceutical, biotechnology and medical companies listed on a stock exchange (as indicated) with current market capitalization of at least US$10 billion, ranked by their market capitalization.

It does not include biotechnology companies that are currently owned by, or form a part of, larger pharmaceutical groups.

== Ranking by market capitalization ==
The following table lists the largest biotechnology and pharmaceutical companies ranked by market capitalization in billion US dollars. The change column indicates the company's relative position in this list compared to their relative position in the preceding year; i.e., an increase would be moving closer to rank 1 and vice versa.

Largest biotechnology and pharmaceutical companies ranked by market capitalization in billion US dollars.
| Rank | Chg | Company | Country | Traded on | Largest | 2020 | 2019 | 2018 | 2017 | 2016 | 2015 | 2014 | 2013 |
|---|---|---|---|---|---|---|---|---|---|---|---|---|---|
| 1 | Steady | Johnson & Johnson^{[P]} | USA | NYSE: JNJ | 399.9 (Dec 2020) | 399.99 | 385.0 | 346.1 | 375.4 | 314.1 | 284.2 | 277.8 | 258.3 |
| 2 | ▲1 | Roche^{[P]} | SUI | SIX: ROG | 291.1 (Dec 2020) | 291.12 | 281.1 | 209.3 | 216.7 | 192.1 | 234.7 | 258.5 | 240.3 |
| 3 | ▲2 | Pfizer^{[P]} | USA | NYSE: PFE | 310.5 (Jul 2000) | 208.11 | 216.7 | 259.7 | 215.9 | 196.3 | 199.3 | 205.4 | 196.0 |
| 4 | ▼1 | Novartis^{[P]} | SUI | NYSE: NVS | 275.2 (Jul 2015) | 202.09 | 240.0 | 200.0 | 196.7 | 170.5 | 206.1 | 229.8 | 195.0 |
| 5 | ▼1 | Merck & Co.^{[P]} | USA | NYSE: MRK | 232.9 (Dec 2019) | 201.80 | 232.9 | 205.8 | 153.3 | 164.3 | 147.6 | 166.9 | 146.5 |
| 6 | | Moderna^{[P]} | USA | NSE: MRNA | 201 (Sep 2021) | 68.5 | 45.0 | | | | | | - |
| 7 | Steady | Abbott Laboratories^{[P]} | USA | NYSE: ABT | 190.4 (Dec 2020) | 190.44 | 153.5 | 126.8 | 99.3 | 56.4 | 67.0 | 67.9 | 59.3 |
| 8 | ▲2 | AbbVie^{[B]} | USA | NYSE: ABBV | 196.2 (Jan 2018) | 182.27 | 130.9 | 146.3 | 154.4 | 100.2 | 96.8 | 104.1 | 83.8 |
| 9 | Steady | Novo Nordisk^{[P]} | DEN | NYSE: NVO | 161.9 (Dec 2020) | 161.99 | 137.1 | 111.9 | 131.2 | 92.6 | 153.9 | 125.4 | - |
| 10 | ▲2 | Eli Lilly & Co^{[P]} | USA | NYSE: LLY | 158.3 (Dec 2020) | 158.30 | 126.9 | 125.6 | 93.0 | 80.9 | 93.4 | 76.6 | 57.0 |
| 11 | ▲3 | Bristol-Myers Squibb^{[P]} | USA | Nasdaq: BMY | 137.8 (Dec 2020) | 137.85 | 105.0 | 85.0 | 100.3 | 98.2 | 114.8 | 97.6 | 87.2 |
| 12 | ▼4 | Amgen^{[B]} | USA | Nasdaq: AMGN | 145.8 (Dec 2019) | 129.79 | 144.6 | 128.8 | 126.2 | 108.9 | 122.5 | 93.1 | 78.7 |
| 13 | ▼2 | AstraZeneca^{[P]} | GBR; SWE | LSE: AZN | 130.8 (Dec 2019) | 129.44 | 130.8 | 96.2 | 87.9 | 68.8 | 85.8 | 88.9 | 74.6 |
| 14 | ▲4 | Sanofi^{[P]} | FRA | NYSE: SNY | 151.3 (Sep 2014) | 120.66 | 63.5 | 108.4 | 108.2 | 101.8 | 111.8 | 138.1 | 142.0 |
| 15 | ▼2 | GlaxoSmithKline^{[P]} | GBR | LSE: GSK | 174.9 (May 2006) | 90.15 | 117.2 | 94.8 | 87.9 | 93.3 | 97.6 | 128.9 | 129.6 |
| 16 | ▲1 | Stryker Corporation^{[P]} | USA | NYSE: SYK | 88.8 (Dec 2020) | 88.81 | 78.5 | 58.6 | 58.0 | 45.1 | 34.7 | 35.7 | 28.4 |
| 17 | ▲2 | Zoetis^{[P]} | USA | Nasdaq: ZTS | 76.6 (Aug 2020) | 75.97 | 63.2 | 41.4 | 35.1 | 26.4 | 23.8 | 21.6 | 16.3 |
| 18 | ▼3 | Gilead Sciences^{[B]} | USA | Nasdaq: GILD | 179.6 (Jun 2013) | 71.93 | 82.3 | 81.6 | 93.6 | 96.6 | 145.8 | 109.0 | 78.4 |
| 19 | ▲6 | Daiichi Sankyo^{[P]} | JPN | Nasdaq: DSNKY | 45.3 (Dec 2019) | 63.92 | 45.3 | 22.7 | 27.5 | 35.3 | 38.8 | 33.2 | 28.7 |
| 20 | ▲1 | Vertex Pharmaceuticals^{[B]} | USA | Nasdaq: VRTX | 78.9 (Jul 2020) | 61.33 | 56.3 | 42.2 | 37.9 | 18.3 | 31.0 | 28.7 | 17.4 |
| 21 | ▼4 | Bayer^{[P]} | GER | FWB: BAYN | 129.0 (Mar 2015) | 58.12 | 80.1 | 63.1 | 101.9 | 85.3 | 103.2 | 113.2 | 117.4 |
| 22 | ▼2 | Takeda Pharmaceutical^{[P]} | JPN | Nasdaq: TAK | 61.5 (Dec 2019) | 56.78 | 61.5 | 52.9 | 40.2 | 45.6 | 47.8 | 37.5 | 34.3 |
| 23 | ▲1 | Illumina^{[B]} | USA | Nasdaq: ILMN | 56.0 (Jul 2019) | 53.51 | 48.2 | 44.1 | 40.2 | 39.4 | 35.4 | 28.6 | 25.7 |
| 24 | ▲2 | Regeneron Pharmaceuticals^{[B]} | USA | Nasdaq: REGN | 61.4 (Aug 2015) | 52.52 | 41.2 | 40.3 | 40.4 | 39.3 | 56.5 | 42.0 | 27.4 |
| 25 | ▼3 | Biogen^{[B]} | USA | Nasdaq: BIIB | 111.7 (Mar 2015) | 38.66 | 54.7 | 63.5 | 67.4 | 61.6 | 68.3 | 79.7 | 66.1 |
| 26 | ▲2 | Alexion Pharmaceuticals^{[P]} | USA | Nasdaq: ALXN | 47.0 (Jul 2015) | 33.52 | 24.3 | 21.7 | 26.7 | 27.4 | 43.1 | 36.7 | 26.0 |
| 27 | ▲3 | Seagen^{[B]} | USA | Nasdaq: SGEN | 38.2 (Oct 2020) | 34.44 | 19.5 | 13.8 | | | | | |
| 28 | ▼1 | Astellas^{[P]} | JPN | TYO: 4503 | 40.6 (Dec 2015) | 27.52 | 32.7 | 23.8 | 29.3 | 25.7 | 40.6 | 35.8 | 27.6 |
| 29 | ▲4 | Genmab^{[B]} | DEN | Nasdaq: GMAB | 25.9 (Nov 2020) | 25.53 | 14.5 | 10.6 | 10.8 | 10.8 | 8.8 | 3.8 | 2.6 |
| 30 | ▼1 | Eisai Pharmaceutical^{[P]} | JPN | TYO: 4523 | 37.3 (Dec 2016) | 19.93 | 21.5 | 23.0 | 24.5 | 37.3 | 28.8 | 30.2 | 28.7 |
| 31 | | Alnylam Pharmaceuticals ^{[P]} | USA | NSE: ALNY | 23.36 | 18.5 | 24.0 | 21.0 | 16.0 | | | | - |
| 32 | Steady | Incyte^{[P]} | USA | NSE: INCY | 31.2 (Mar 2017) | 19.25 | 18.8 | 13.5 | 18.3 | 15.4 | 10.6 | 7.3 | 4.6 |
| 33 | Steady | BioMarin^{[P]} | USA | NSE: BMRN | 24.0 (Jul 2015) | 16.03 | 15.2 | 15.1 | 18.3 | 20.4 | 13.8 | 12.9 | 10.8 |
| 34 | ▲ | BeiGene ^{[P]} | CHN | SSE: 688235 | 33.14 (Nov 2021) | 34.20 | 27.00 | 26.00 | 24.03 | 10.28 | 8.33 | 4.45 | 1.20 |
| 35 | ▼1 | BioNTech^{[P]} | GER | NSE: BNTX | 44.07 | 62.52 | 19.62 | 7.68 | | | | | - |
| 36 | ▲1 | Horizon Therapeutics^{[P]} | USA | NSE: HZNP | 18.06 (Dec 2020) | 14.2 | 11.6 | 9.3 | 5.0 | 6.5 | 2.8 | 2.0 | - |
| 37 | ▲1 | 10x Genomics^{[P]} | USA | NSE: TXG | 17.54 | 11.2 | | | | | | | - |
| 38 | ▼1 | Jiangsu Hengrui Medicine^{[P]} | CHN | SSE: 600276 | 41.17 | 59.98 | 93.42 | 60.85 | 30.53 | 30.54 | 16.79 | 15.10 | - |
| 39 | ▲1 | Elanco^{[P]} | USA | NYSE: ELAN | 13.06 (Nov 2020) | 11.2 | | | | | | | - |
| 40 | ▼1 | Celltrion^{[P]} | ROK | KRX: 068270 | 23.03 (2021) | 40.90 | 19.22 | | | | | | - |
| 41 | ▲1 | Viatris^{[P]} | USA | NSE: VTRS | 18.50 (Dec 2021) | | | | | | | | - |
| 42 | ▲1 | Sun Pharma^{[P]} | IND | NSE: SUNPHARMA | 27.15 (2021) | 19.01 | | | | | | | - |
| 43 | ▲1 | Divi's Laboratories^{[P]} | IND | NSE: DIVISLAB | 15.29 (Nov 2021) | | | | | | | | - |
| 44 | ▼1 | Dr. Reddy's Laboratories^{[P]} | IND | NSE: DRREDDY | 10.94 (2021) | 11.75 | | | | | | | - |
| 45 | ▼31 | Teva Pharmaceuticals ^{[P]} | ISR | NYSE: TEVA | 110.5 (Jul 2015) | 10.69 | 48.3 | 16.2 | 24.4 | 32.7 | 13.2 | 70.5 | 29.3 |
| 46 | ▲1 | Cipla^{[P]} | IND | NSE: CIPLA | 10.21 (Dec 2021) | 10.19 | | | | | | | - |

- ^{B} – Biotechnology company
- ^{P} – Pharmaceutical company

== See also ==
- List of largest biomedical companies by revenue
