= Hacienda La Puente Unified School District =

School district in California

The Hacienda La Puente Unified School District (HLPUSD) is a school district located in Southern California. It is the largest school district in the east San Gabriel Valley in terms of student population, serving 20,000 students from the unincorporated community of Hacienda Heights, portions of the cities of Industry, La Puente and West Covina and portions of the unincorporated communities of Avocado Heights, Valinda and West Puente Valley. The district's headquarters are located in the City Of Industry.

The school year begins in early August and ends in May, the week before the Memorial Day holiday.

== Schools ==
Comprehensive high schools

- La Puente High School, La Puente
- Los Altos High School, Hacienda Heights
- Glen A. Wilson High School, Hacienda Heights
- William Workman High School, City Of Industry

Alternative High Schools

- Puente Hills School/Community Day School, La Puente
- Valley Alternative High School, Hacienda Heights
- Stimson Learning Center, Hacienda Heights

K-8 Schools

- Lassalette School, La Puente
- Fairgrove Academy, La Puente
- Mesa Robles School, Hacienda Heights
- Cedarlane Academy, Hacienda Heights

Middle schools

- Grandview School, Valinda
- Newton Middle, Hacienda Heights
- Orange Grove Middle, Hacienda Heights
- Sierra Vista Middle, La Puente
- Sparks Middle, La Puente

Elementary schools

- Baldwin Academy, La Puente, California
- Bixby Elementary, Hacienda Heights
- California Academy, La Puente
- Del Valle Elementary, La Puente
- Kwis Elementary, Hacienda Heights
- Grazide Elementary, Hacienda Heights
- Los Altos Elementary, Hacienda Heights
- Los Molinos Elementary, Hacienda Heights
- Los Robles Academy, Hacienda Heights
- Nelson Elementary, La Puente
- Palm Elementary, Hacienda Heights
- Shadybend Elementary, Hacienda Heights
- Sparks Elementary, La Puente
- Sunset Elementary and Orthopedic Handicapped, La Puente
- Temple Academy, La Puente
- Valinda School of Academics, La Puente
- Wedgeworth Elementary, Hacienda Heights
- Wing Lane Elementary, Valinda
- Workman Elementary, La Puente

== Board of Education ==
The Board of Education has five members, each serving a four-year term. Starting with the November 2022 election, members began to be elected by trustee area instead of at-large. This change was made to meet the California Voting Rights Act, and the trustee map was approved on February 10, 2022.

== Recent History ==
Since the established changes by the California Voting Rights Act, each trustee is dedicated to serving students and faculty within a respective section of the district. As of the 2024-25 school year, the trustees are as follows.

- Stephanie Serrano (Area 1)
- Nancy Loera (Area 2)
- Adriana Quiñones (Area 3)
- Gino Kwok (Area 4)
- Jeffrey De La Torre (Area 5)

The enrollment numbers for the district's 2024-25 school year show an estimated 15,480 students across the district.
