= Crispin Castro Monroy =

Mexican politician

Lauro Crispin Castro Monroy

Municipal president of Santa Cruz Atizapán
- In office 1970–1972
- Preceded by: Ismael Molina
- Succeeded by: Genaro Molina

Personal details
- Born: August 18, 1936 (age 90) Santa Cruz Atizapán, State of Mexico, Mexico
- Party: PRI
- Website: Enciclopedia de los Municipios de México

Crispín Castro Monroy (born 18 August 1936) was the municipal president of Santa Cruz Atizapán in the State of Mexico, from January 1970 to January 1972. While in office he made changes to help the town and citizens. He was a member of the Institutional Revolutionary Party (PRI).

In 1955 he had left Santa Cruz Atizapán to work in Anaheim, California. He returned to Mexico to serve as municipal president.

During the period of Operation Wetback, Crispín was one of many Mexican immigrants that was given permission to work in the United States under the Bracero Program.

In 1960, Crispín married Natalia Briseño García. They had 5 total children, all men. His second oldest, David Castro, died in a car accident in 1981. He has two sons that live in California and two back home in Mexico. Crispín and Natalia were married up until her death in 2021.

Castro Monroy now lives in La Puente, California. He lives faithfully as a Christian with his son and two grandsons.
