= Utility Trailer Manufacturing Company =

American semi-trailer manufacturer

- Type: Private
- Founded: 1914
- Founders: H. C. Bennett; E. W. Bennett
- Headquarters: City of Industry, Los Angeles County, California, United States, U.S.
- Products: Semi-trailers, refrigerated vans & trailers
- Website: www.utilitytrailer.com

Utility Trailer Manufacturing Company is an American semi-trailer truck dry van, flatbed, and refrigerated van trailer manufacturing company, with its headquarters in the City of Industry, Los Angeles County, California, and sales office in Alpharetta, Georgia and a Parts Distribution Center in Batavia, Ohio. The company also designs and manufactures dry freight vans, curtainsided trailers, and aerodynamic technologies. It is the largest manufacturer of refrigerated van trailers in the United States.

Utility was founded in 1914, by brothers H. C. Bennett and E. W. Bennett. Before founding Utility, the two brothers had previously owned a lumber business in Phoenix, Arizona. After selling off that company, the two purchased the assets of a wagon company in Los Angeles and incorporated a new company there. The name Utility was adopted after the company had pivoted toward the manufacturing of trailers for the burgeoning diesel truck market of the early 20th century; most of Utility's clientele were California's original utility companies, and the name stuck. Ownership of Utility has remained within the Bennett family since its founding. The company's operations remained localized within the western United States until the 1960s, when it began its gradual expansion east of the Rocky Mountains. By the mid-1990s, most of the company's business was in the East Coast as opposed to the west, although its base of operations remained in the City of Industry in Los Angeles County.

Utility has six trailer manufacturing facilities in North America. Utility's single temp and multi-temp refrigerated trailers are manufactured at the Clearfield, Utah, Atkins, Virginia, and Piedras Negras, Mexico plants. Utility's dry vans are manufactured at the Glade Spring, Virginia and Paragould, Arkansas plants. Utility also manufactures several flatbed models including an aluminum/steel combination flatbed, an all-steel flatbed, drop decks, and curtainsided trailers, all produced at the Enterprise, Alabama facility. The company's manufacturing plant in Clearfield, Utah, was opened up in 1993, occupying a 58 acres (230,000 m^{2}) plot of land. In 1994, they opened up the Atkins, Virginia, plant, occupying 55 acres (220,000 m^{2}) there. After the city of Clearfield denied them a permit to expand their operations beyond their plot of land in 1998, Utility opened up the Glade Spring, Virginia, facility in 1999.

The company also has an independent dealer network in over 100 locations in the United States, Canada, Mexico and South America. Authorized dealers offer trailer sales, aftermarket parts, and service.
