= Awigna, California =

Awigna
- Former settlement
- Location in California
- Coordinates: 34°01′12″N 117°56′58″W
- Country: United States
- State: California
- County: Los Angeles County
- Elevation: 351 ft (107 m)

Awigna (also, Awiz-na) is a former Tongva-Gabrieleño Native American settlement located at the site of modern-day La Puente High School, in the San Gabriel Valley in Los Angeles County, California.

The settlement was one of twenty seven villages included in the records of Mission San Gabriel, indicating that villagers from Awigna were baptized there after its establishment in the Los Angeles Basin in 1776. Awigna was described as "one of the principal rancherias to supply it [the mission] with neophytes."

In 1915, La Puente High School was built on the village site. During the construction process, many artifacts from the village were unearthed and were reportedly put on display at the school for many years. In 2004, it was reported that the whereabouts of these artifacts were unknown.

== See also ==
- Genga
- Toviscanga
- Yaanga
- Category: Tongva populated places
  - Tongva language
