= Los Altos High School (Hacienda Heights, California) =

High school located in California, United States

Coordinates: 34.00769°N 117.97646°W

Location
- 15325 East Los Robles Ave. Hacienda Heights, Los Angeles County, California; USA

Information
- Type: Public
- Established: 1958
- School district: HLPUSD School District
- Principal: Jeff Hess
- Staff: Assistant Principal: Assistant Principal: Samuel Pena Assistant Principal: Danny Hong
- Grades: 9-12
- Enrollment: 1,574 (2023–2024)
- Student to teacher ratio: 23.20
- Schedule type: Block Schedule
- Colors: Royal blue White; Red
- Mascot: Joe the Conqueror
- Rival: Glen A. Wilson High School
- USNWR ranking: 363rd Place as of 2017
- Newspaper: The Conqueror
- Yearbook: Los Recuerdos
- Website: lahs.hlpschools.org

Los Altos High School is a comprehensive four-year public education high school located in the bedroom community of Hacienda Heights, California, United States, in eastern Los Angeles County.

== History ==
The school was founded in 1958 as the second of seven high schools in the former La Puente Union High School District. It is now one of four high schools in the Hacienda La Puente Unified School District, which was created in 1970 by a vote of the electorate unifying four high schools and the Hudson Elementary School District.

Enrollment levels of the school have varied over the years. In 1978, it reached its highest enrollment, of 2,850 students. In the early 1990s the enrollment dropped to about 1,500. It currently hovers around 2,100.

== Sports ==
=== Football ===
Los Altos High School Football has a long history of CIF Championships, especially during the coaching period of Dwayne DeSpain from 1966 to 1996. In August 2022, Los Altos High School dedicated the football field, re-naming it the 'Dwayne DeSpain Field'.

=== Boys' Volleyball ===
The Boys' Volleyball team won the CIF Division IV Title in 2019 for the first time in school history by defeating the Windward Wildcats. This was Los Altos' first championship appearance since back-to-back title losses in 1984 and '85.

=== Girls' Water Polo ===
The Girls' Water Polo team won the CIF Division V Title in 2015 for the first time in school history by defeating number one-seeded Palm Desert High School 8-7.

== Los Altos Academy of Engineering ==
The Los Altos Academy of Engineering was founded in 1989 by Robert Franz, (a science teacher at the time). It started as a joint program between the Hacienda La Puente Unified School District and the La Puente Valley Regional Occupational Program. They have won awards for building and racing a solar car in international competition, and won 1st place in the DaimlerChrysler/Trellis Build Your Dream Vehicle Competition in 2005 and 2006. From 2007 to 2009 the Academy's engineering students competed in the Shell Eco-Marathon Americas, taking 1st place in the hydrogen division in 2007 and presenting the first hydrogen internal combustion engine to compete in 2008.

== Los Altos Visual and Performing Arts Academy ==
The Visual and Performing Arts Academy (VPAA) is a cross-curricular program. The program is available to students for performing arts on a higher level. The five areas that comprise the VPAA (drama, dance, instrumental and vocal music, and technology) come together for spring productions.

== Notable alumni ==
- Phillip Bladh - Academy Award winning production sound mixer of the film Sound of Metal
- Travis Brown - former New Mexico Lobo standout (two-time 1st Team All-MWC) and NFL football player (St. Louis Rams)
- Shaun Cody - Parade All American, former USC Trojan Star, former NFL player, now current commentator for the USC Trojans
- Renae Cuéllar - former player for Mexico Women's National Football Team
- Alan Foster - MLB Baseball Player
- Jenn Im - beauty vlogger and fashion designer
- Bob May - former PGA Tour golfer, lost to Tiger Woods in a playoff at the 2000 PGA Championship
- Michael Smith - former All-America basketball player at BYU and first-round pick of the Boston Celtics (13th overall), current television and color announcer for the Los Angeles Clippers
- Troy Tanner - former member of the national men's volleyball team, which played at the Seoul Olympic Games (1988)
- Joseph Vargas - former US National Team water polo player; helped US National Team win silver at the 1984 Summer Olympics in Los Angeles
- John Vargas - former US National Team water polo player; helped US National Team to fourth place finish at the 1992 Summer Olympics in Barcelona; Stanford Men's Water Polo Head Coach
- Eric Winter - actor
