= Workman High School =

William Workman High School

Location
- 16303 E Temple Ave; Industry, California 91744; United States; 34°01′45″N 117°56′12″W

Information
- Type: Public High School
- Motto: Once a Lobo;Always a Lobo
- Established: 1967
- School district: HLPUSD
- Principal: Tim Espinosa
- Staff: 42.29 (on an FTE basis)
- Grades: 9-12
- Enrollment: 773 (2023-2024)
- Student to teacher ratio: 18.28
- Colors: Red; Black; Gold
- Nickname: Lobos
- Rival: La Puente High School
- Yearbook: Pioneer
- Website: wohs.hlpschools.org

William Workman High School is the only public high school located in City of Industry, California. It is one of four high schools in the Hacienda La Puente Unified School District. For sports, it is a member of the Montview League.

== History ==
School was named after William Workman whom had great success in the Los Angeles area, before moving to Rancho La Puente.

School opened at the beginning of the 1967–68 school year. 1969, James Faul was the Principal, the current principal is Timothy Espinosa.

Located in the City of Industry is the Workman and Temple Family Homestead Museum with William Workman being part of the history of the area. The building is a California Historic Landmark.

== Athletics ==
- Cheer
- Cross Country
- Baseball
- Basketball
- Football
- Soccer
- Softball
- Tennis
- Volleyball
- Water Polo
- Swimming
- Golf
- Track and field.

== Championship Tradition ==
1969, Ben Rico at the track and field league finals set league records in the 100 and 440 yard dashes. Tom Lomax tripled jumped 48'-10" and 49'-11 1/2" to rank one of 1976 top Southern California prep jumpers. Lomax placed 4th at the 1976 CIF state championship in the triple jump. 1991, Myra Smith won the CIF Southern Section 2A shot put and discus. The boys varsity basketball team was, combined with those of two other schools, 196-90 under the leadership of coach Rich Skelton. The first official day of the basketball season, the Lobos varsity basketball team practiced after midnight, and slept the night in the gym. The midnight practiced began under coach Rich Skelton in 1974 (for five years) and was revived in 1982 with coach Tim Stimpfel. Four of five of these years Workman won league. 1984, boys varsity basketball team won CIF 2-A division championship game. 2013, boys varsity basketball team won the Montview League championship four out of five consecutive seasons. Workman has won several CIF southern section wrestling championships, Mike Ramos (1987 4A 165-Lb), Reymond Molina (1989 3A 145-Lbs), Justin Ferrenti (2001 V 152-Lbs), and Cesar Martin (2001 V 171-Lbs).

Dave McGuire 7'-0" center averaged 18 rebounds per game during the 1977 basketball season.

1987, Richard Horrmann started the space shuttle club, created a Challenger time capsule, and was selected to serve on committee to select a new school principal.

1985 Workman hosted the annual Fast Action Summer Basketball Camp that included former Los Angeles Lakers players Keith Erickson and Brad Holland. 2018 Workman hosted the Superstar Basketball League.

Teacher John Horn was recognized as 1975 California Biology Teacher of the Year by the National Association of Biology Teachers.

== Musical Excellence ==
- 2012 Marching Band Finalist SCSBOA 1A Division Championships
- 2013 Marching Band Finalist SCSBOA 2A Division Championships
- 2014 Marching Band Finalist SCSBOA 2A Division Championships
- 2015 Marching Band Finalist SCSBOA 3A Division Championships
- 2016 Marching Band Finalist SCSBOA 3A Division Championships
- 2017 Marching Band Finalist SCSBOA 3A Division Championships
- 2019 Marching Band 3rd Place (Bronze Medal) SCSBOA 1A Division Championships
- 2021 Marching Band Finalist SCSBOA 1A Division Championships
- 2022 Marching Band Finalist SCSBOA 1A Division Championships
- 2023 Marching Band Finalist SCSBOA 1A Division Championships

== Winter Guard Excellence ==
- 2019 Winter Guard Association of Southern California HSAA Bronze Medalist
- 2024 Winter Guard Association of Southern California HSA Gold Medalist
- 2026 Winter Guard Association of Southern California HSA Silver Medalist

== Alumni ==
- Norbert Davidds-Garrido, NFL football player
- Padma Lakshmi, class of 1988, model and host of Top Chef
- Steven Luevano, class of 1998, boxer and WBO Featherweight Champion
- David Castañeda, actor

== See also ==
- Past Workman High School Team Championships
- Workman Football roster 2005 to 2020
- Workman boys Basketball roster 2004-2005 to 2020-2021
- Workman girls Basketball roster 2006-2007 to 2019-2020
