= City of Industry, California =

City in the United States

City of Industry
- City
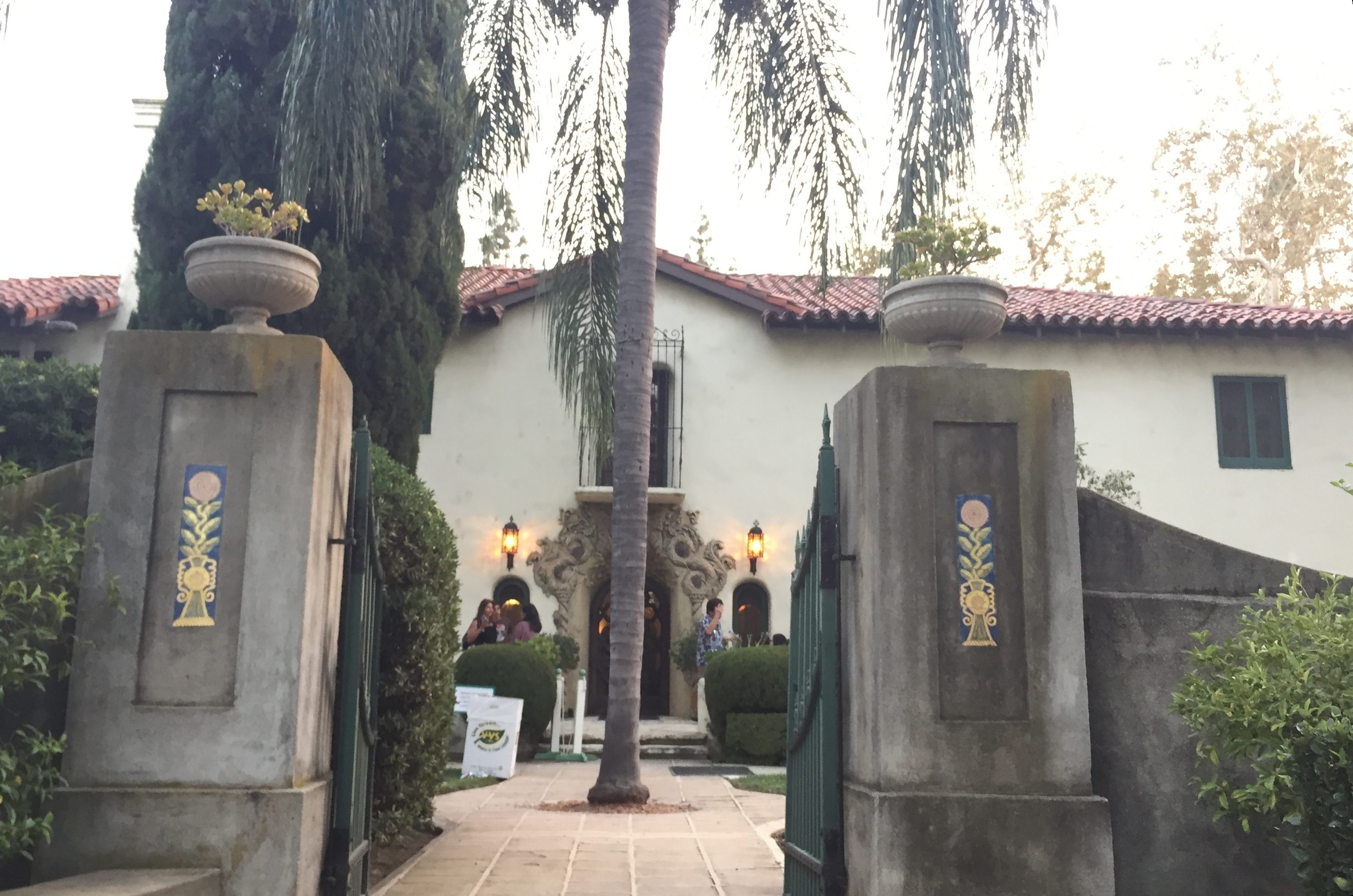
- La Casa Nueva

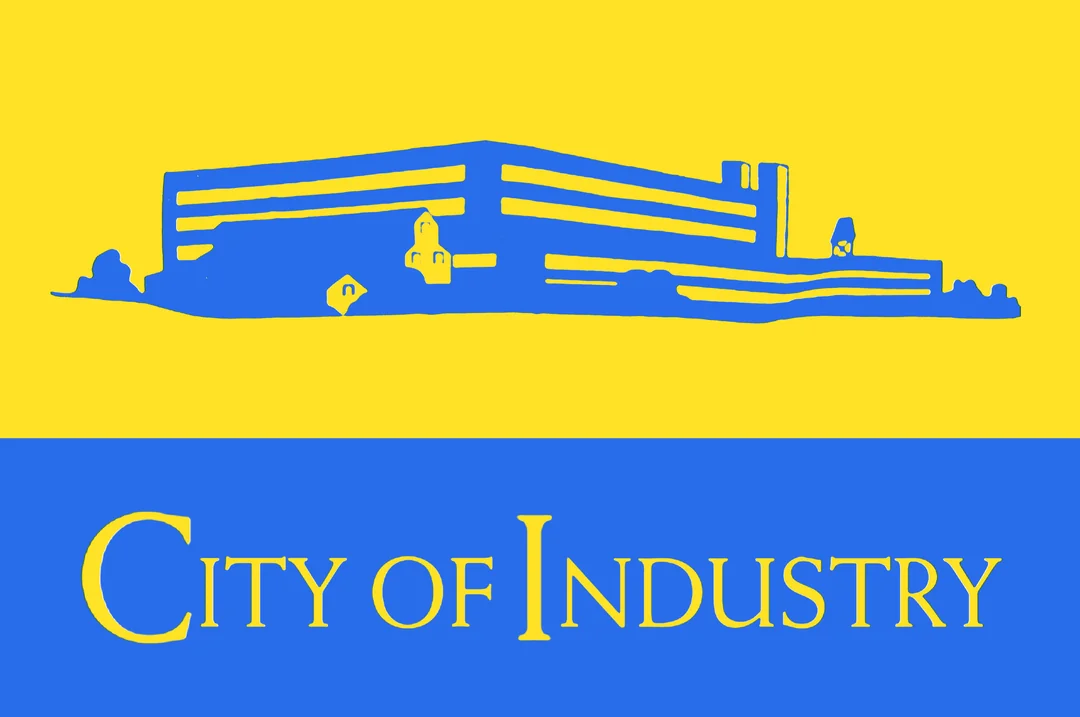
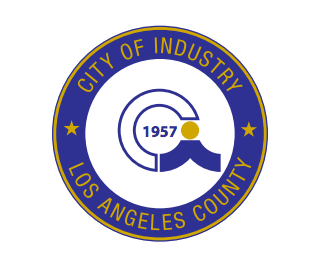
- Flag Seal
- Motto: Jobs, Enterprise, and Regional Infrastructure
- Interactive map of City of Industry
- Location within Los Angeles Metropolitan Area Location within California Location within the United States
- Coordinates: 34.005°N 117.939°W
- Country: United States
- State: California
- County: Los Angeles
- Incorporated: June 18, 1957
- Named for: The city's goals to develop its industrial facilities

Government
  - Type: Council-manager government
  - Mayor: Cory C. Moss
  - Mayor Pro-Tem: Michael Greubel
  - City Council: Mark Radecki; Newell W. Ruggels; Steve Marcucci
  - City Manager: Joshua Nelson, PE

Area
  - Total: 12.06 sq mi (31.24 km^{2})
  - Land: 11.78 sq mi (30.52 km^{2})
  - Water: 0.28 sq mi (0.72 km^{2})
- Elevation: 322 ft (98 m)

Population (2020)
  - Total: 264
  - Density: 22.4/sq mi (8.65/km^{2})
- Time zone: UTC-8 (PST)
  - Summer (DST): UTC-7 (PDT)
- ZIP Codes: 90601, 91714–91716, 91732, 91744–91746, 91748, 91789
- Area codes: 562, 626, 909
- FIPS code: 06-36490
- GNIS feature IDs: 243853, 2410102
- Website: www.cityofindustry.org

The City of Industry is a city in the San Gabriel Valley in eastern Los Angeles County, California, United States. It is almost entirely industrial, containing over 3,000 businesses employing 67,000 people, with only 264 residents as of the 2020 census, making it the third least populous city in the state. It was incorporated on June 18, 1957, and has become the economic hub for the San Gabriel Valley.

== History ==
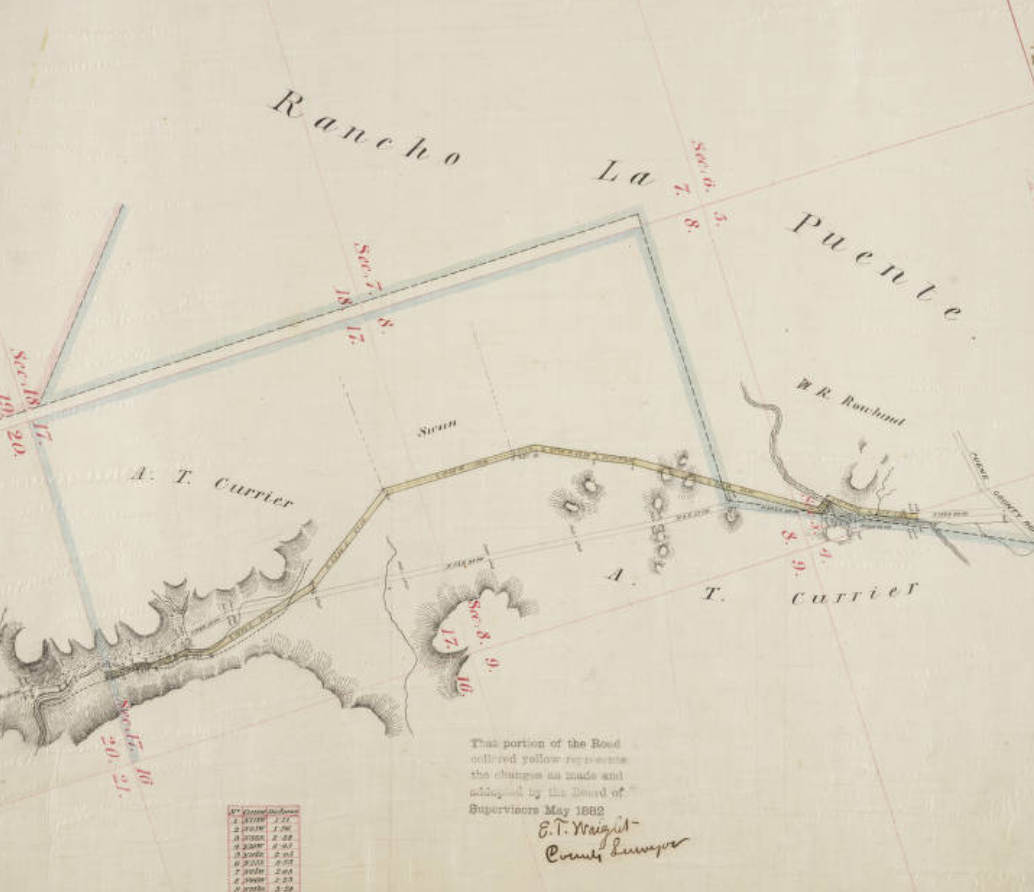
The City of Industry sits on land that was originally part of Rancho La Puente, a Mexican era rancho grant.

In 1841, William and Nicolasa Workman, who migrated from elsewhere in Mexico with John Rowland and others, received a land grant for Rancho La Puente from the governor of Alta California, Juan Bautista Alvarado. The ranch eventually grew to almost 49,000 acres. The Workmans quickly established themselves as cattle ranchers and did well financially during the Gold Rush, supplying fresh beef to the gold fields. Following the discovery of oil by their son on land they owned in the Montebello hills, the Workmans' grandson, Walter P. Temple, and his wife, Laura, bought the Workman House and surrounding land in 1917. This property is now known as the Workman and Temple Family Homestead Museum and is a museum and heritage site in present-day City of Industry that is free and open to the public. In the 1910s, Tract 1343 was created and shows a large portion of 2017's City boundaries.

In the late 19th and early 20th century, both the Southern Pacific and Union Pacific Railroad were built through the San Jose Creek valley in what is now Industry. The Union Pacific would establish a major railyard at the Marne siding in what is now Industry. Valley Boulevard, a major artery connecting Los Angeles with points east, was also laid through what would become the City of Industry. The presence of the railroads and Valley Boulevard would lead to the development of warehouses that became a large part of Industry's economy.

The City of Industry was incorporated as a charter city on June 18, 1957, after an election in the previous December where voters approved incorporation, with 118 in favor and 28 against. A little under fifteen years from its incorporation, the City of Industry created a general plan as required by state law to guide its future development. The 1971 document remains in effect in an amended form as of 2020, nearly a half century later. The plan was overseen by planning consultants Gruen Associates, a firm established in 1950 by Austrian-born Victor Gruen, an architect and urban planner.

The city's first mayor, John Ferrero (1912–1996), was elected to the City Council at Industry's incorporation, and served in such capacity for 39 years, becoming the longest serving mayor in California.

The City of Industry was named for the goals and objectives section of the general plan which identified the primary goal of the city as "creating and maintaining an ideal setting for manufacturing, distribution and industrial facilities."

In 1962, the City of Industry Chamber of Commerce formed and in 1974, the Workman House became a historical landmark. In 1979/1980 a former landfill near Azusa Avenue was converted into the Industry Hills Golf Club, including a hotel and the Eisenhower golf course. In 1981, the Industry Hills Expo Center opened as a community multi-purpose event facility.

In 1985, the inaugural Charity Pro Rodeo took place, to raise funds for youth in the San Gabriel Valley. The Rodeo still takes place annually. In 1991, in partnership with the Los Angeles County Sheriff's Department, the Youth Activities League was formed to offer sports to at-risk children as an alternative to gang activity.

In recognition of the importance of mass transit, the city invested heavily in the development of a Metrolink transit station near the confluence of the 60 and 57 freeways and in 1993, the City of Industry Metrolink Station opened. In 2004, the Environmental Impact Report and Design for the 57/60 Confluence Project was completed. The three-phased program of improvements consists of ramp and interchange reconfigurations as well as the addition of bypass lanes to reduce weaving, resulting in less congestion for the sixth-worst congested and dangerous freeway interchange in the nation.

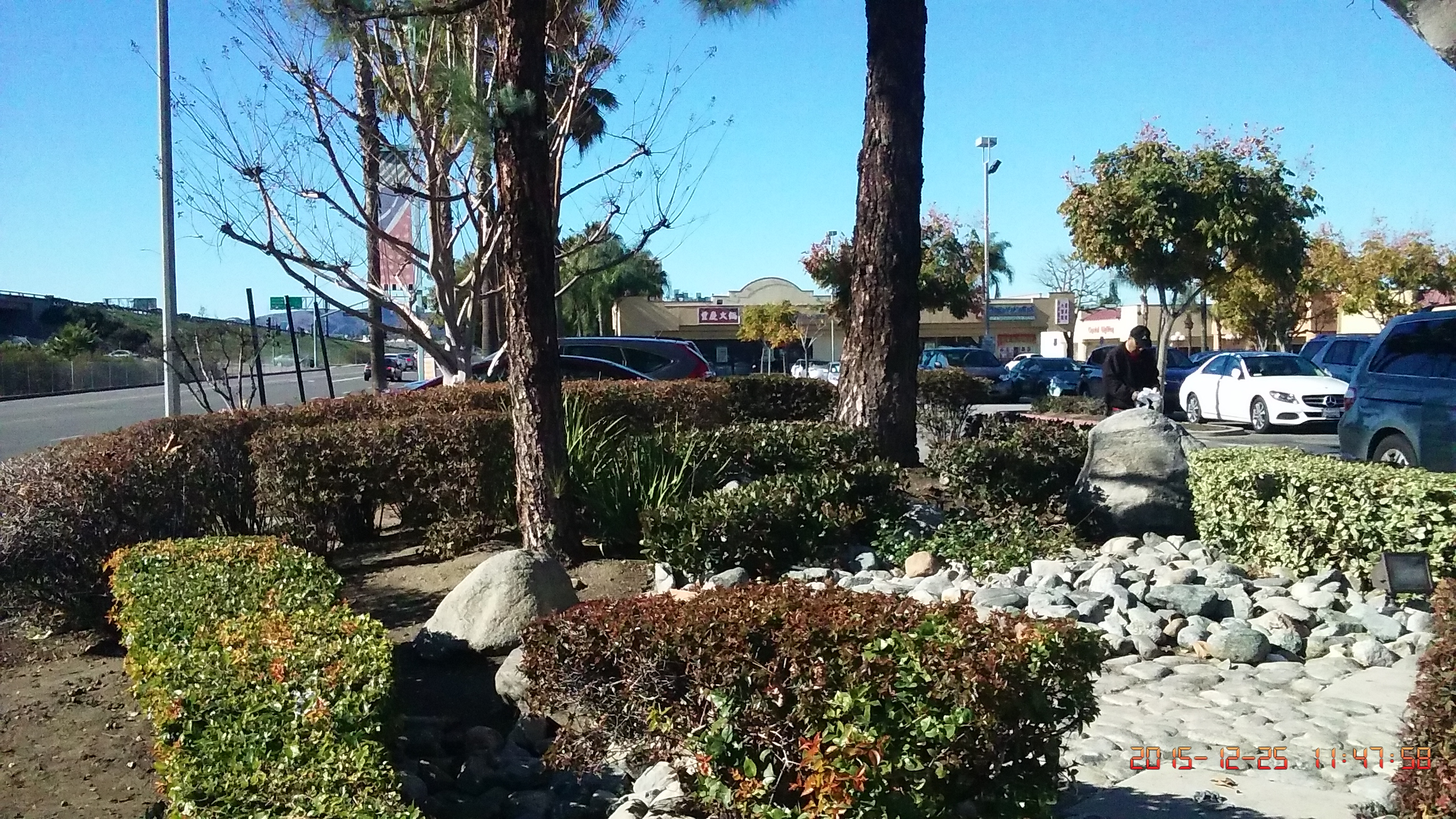
Street view in the City of Industry

In the late 2000s, Edward P. Roski, part-owner of the Los Angeles Lakers and Los Angeles Kings, announced plans for a new NFL stadium in the City of Industry. The intended purpose was to attract a team to the Los Angeles region which was without any NFL team at the time. Roski, who built the Staples Center, stated that the new 75,000-seat stadium, a part of a 600-acre entertainment and retail project, would all be privately financed and be the centerpiece of a new entertainment complex in the City of Industry. In June 2008, reports surfaced that the City of Industry could become the home of the San Francisco 49ers or the Oakland Raiders as early as 2010 when both teams' stadium leases expired, or could become home to another team. The project was cleared to begin construction, though it kept waiting on the negotiations of the NFL's commitment to move a team (or possibility two) to Los Angeles. The NFL eventually returned to the LA area, with the Los Angeles Rams and Los Angeles Chargers moving into SoFi Stadium in Inglewood.

City of Industry will host the mountain bike competition at the 2028 Summer Olympics, with the competition taking place adjacent to the Pacific Palms Resort.

== Geography ==
The City of Industry is located 17.6 miles (28.4 km) east of Los Angeles. According to the United States Census Bureau, the city has a total area of 12.07 square miles (31.3 km^{2}), of which 11.79 square miles (30.5 km^{2}) is land and 0.28 square miles (0.73 km^{2}) (2.32%) is water.

Climate data for City of Industry, California
Month	Jan	Feb	Mar	Apr	May	Jun	Jul	Aug	Sep	Oct	Nov	Dec	Year
Mean daily maximum °F (°C)	69 (21)	70 (21)	71 (22)	76 (24)	77 (25)	83 (28)	87 (31)	88 (31)	87 (31)	82 (28)	75 (24)	70 (21)	78 (26)
Mean daily minimum °F (°C)	44 (7)	46 (8)	48 (9)	51 (11)	55 (13)	59 (15)	63 (17)	63 (17)	62 (17)	56 (13)	48 (9)	44 (7)	53 (12)
Average precipitation inches (mm)	3.94 (100)	4.42 (112)	3.63 (92)	0.93 (24)	0.37 (9.4)	0.14 (3.6)	0.03 (0.76)	0.10 (2.5)	0.41 (10)	0.53 (13)	1.25 (32)	2.07 (53)	17.82 (453)

=== Surrounding areas ===
West Puente Valley / La Puente / Valinda / South San Jose Hills / West Covina / Walnut
El Monte / Baldwin Park Pomona
South El Monte / Avocado Heights Diamond Bar
Pico Rivera / Rose Hills Diamond Bar
Hacienda Heights / Rowland Heights

== Demographics ==
Historical population
Census	Pop.	Note	%±
1960	778		—
1970	712		−8.5%
1980	412		−42.1%
1990	631		53.2%
2000	777		23.1%
2010	219		−71.8%
2020	264		20.5%
U.S. Decennial Census; 1860–1870 1880-1890; 1900 1910 1920; 1930 1940 1950; 1960 1970 1980; 1990 2000 2010; 2020

Industry first appeared as a city in the 1960 U.S. census. Prior to 1960, it was part of unincorporated El Monte and San Jose townships.

Industry city, California – Racial and ethnic composition Note: the US Census treats Hispanic/Latino as an ethnic category. This table excludes Latinos from the racial categories and assigns them to a separate category. Hispanics/Latinos may be of any race.
Race / Ethnicity (NH = Non-Hispanic)	Pop 2000	Pop 2010	Pop 2020	% 2000	% 2010	% 2020
White alone (NH)	209	83	82	26.90%	37.90%	31.06%
Black or African American alone (NH)	32	1	8	4.12%	0.46%	3.03%
Native American or Alaska Native alone (NH)	13	0	0	1.67%	0.00%	0.00%
Asian alone (NH)	30	18	33	3.86%	8.22%	12.50%
Native Hawaiian or Pacific Islander alone (NH)	0	0	0	0.00%	0.00%	0.00%
Other race alone (NH)	0	0	2	0.00%	0.00%	0.76%
Mixed race or Multiracial (NH)	25	2	9	3.22%	0.91%	3.41%
Hispanic or Latino (any race)	468	115	130	60.23%	52.51%	49.24%
Total	777	219	264	100.00%	100.00%	100.00%

=== 2020 ===
The 2020 United States census reported that Industry had a population of 264. The population density was 22.4 inhabitants per square mile (8.6/km^{2}). The racial makeup of Industry was 119 (45.1%) White, 9 (3.4%) African American, 0 (0.0%) Native American, 37 (14.0%) Asian, 0 (0.0%) Pacific Islander, 55 (20.8%) from other races, and 44 (16.7%) from two or more races. Hispanic or Latino of any race were 130 persons (49.2%).

The census reported that 152 people (57.6% of the population) lived in households, 16 (6.1%) lived in non-institutionalized group quarters, and 96 (36.4%) were institutionalized.

There were 57 households, out of which 21 (36.8%) had children under the age of 18 living in them, 19 (33.3%) were married-couple households, 11 (19.3%) were cohabiting couple households, 13 (22.8%) had a female householder with no partner present, and 14 (24.6%) had a male householder with no partner present. 12 households (21.1%) were one person, and 3 (5.3%) were one person aged 65 or older. The average household size was 2.67. There were 40 families (70.2% of all households).

The age distribution was 50 people (18.9%) under the age of 18, 11 people (4.2%) aged 18 to 24, 55 people (20.8%) aged 25 to 44, 54 people (20.5%) aged 45 to 64, and 94 people (35.6%) who were 65 years of age or older. The median age was 51.0 years. For every 100 females, there were 82.1 males.

There were 74 housing units at an average density of 6.3 units per square mile (2.4 units/km^{2}), of which 57 (77.0%) were occupied. Of these, 9 (15.8%) were owner-occupied, and 48 (84.2%) were occupied by renters.

=== 2010 ===
At the 2010 census, the City of Industry had a population of 219. The population density was 18.2 inhabitants per square mile (7.0/km^{2}). The population was 58.9% White (37.9% Non-Hispanic White), 0.5% Black or African American, and 8.2% Asian. Hispanics or Latinos of any race made up 52.5% of the population.

The census reported that 214 people (98% of the population) lived in households, 5 (2%) lived in non-institutionalized group quarters, and none were institutionalized.

There were 69 households, 32 (46%) had children under the age of 18 living in them, 37 (54%) were opposite-sex married couples living together, 7 (10%) had a female householder with no husband present, 9 (13%) had a male householder with no wife present. There were 3 (4%) unmarried opposite-sex partnerships, and 2 (3%) same-sex married couples or partnerships. Twelve households (17%) were one person and 6 (9%) had someone living alone who was 65 or older. The average household size was 3.1. There were 53 families (77% of households); the average family size was 3.6.

The population was spread out by age with 59 people (27%) under the age of 18, 25 people (11%) aged 18 to 24, 51 people (23%) aged 25 to 44, 62 people (28%) aged 45 to 64, and 22 people (10%) who were 65 or older. The median age was 37.5 years. For every 100 females, there were 108.6 males. For every 100 females age 18 and over, there were 102.5 males.

There were 73 housing units at an average density of 6.1 per square mile, of the occupied units 22 (32%) were owner-occupied and 47 (68%) were rented. The homeowner vacancy rate was 0%; the rental vacancy rate was 6%. Sixty-six people (30% of the population) lived in owner-occupied housing units and 148 people (68%) lived in rental housing units.

According to the 2010 United States Census, the City of Industry had a median household income of $49,329, with 1.0% of the population living below the federal poverty line.

== Government and infrastructure ==
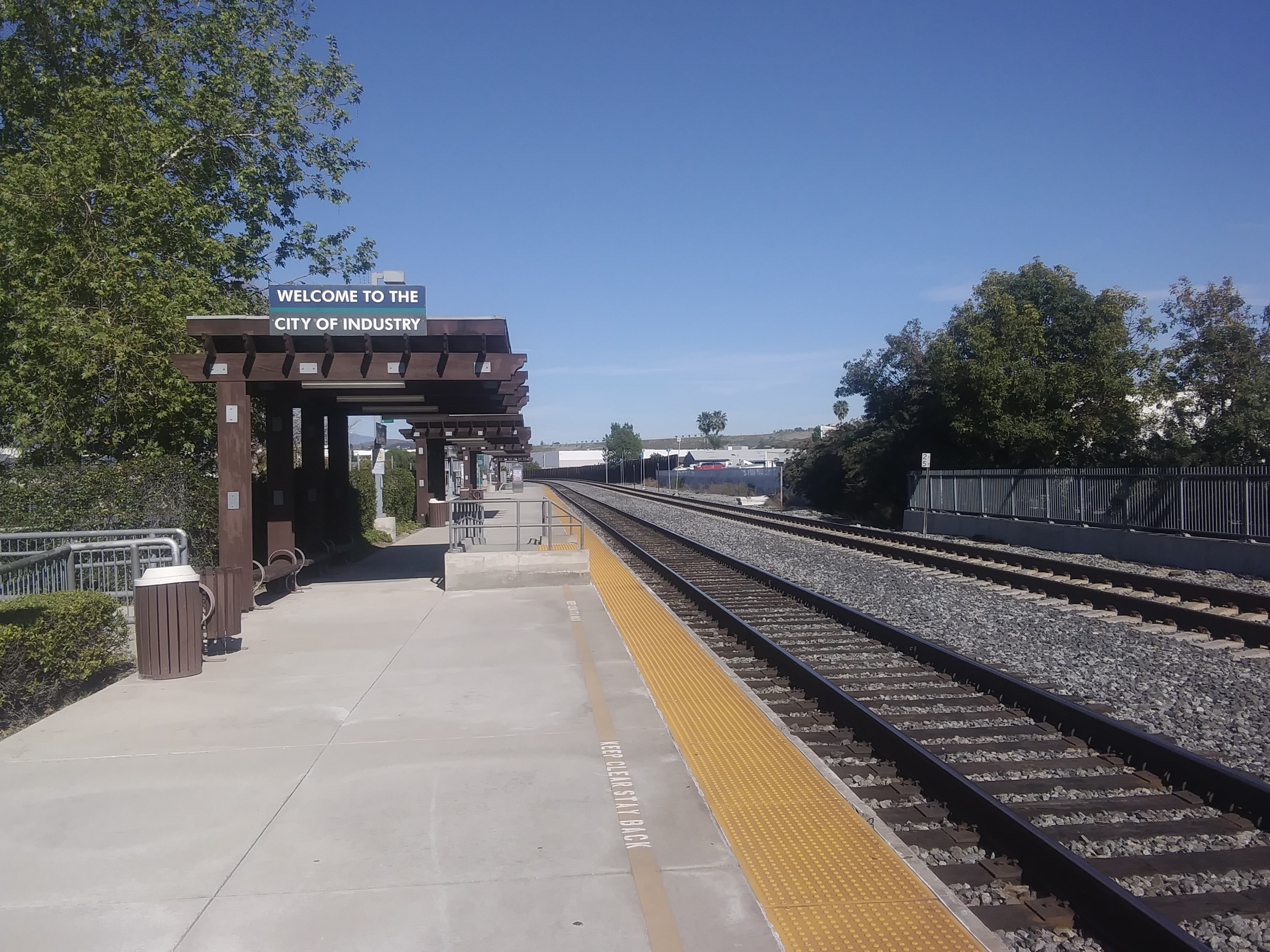
Train platform at Industry station.

In the California State Legislature, the City of Industry is in the 30th senatorial district, represented by Democrat Bob Archuleta, and in the 56th Assembly district, represented by Democrat Lisa Calderon.

In the United States House of Representatives, the City of Industry is split between California's 31st congressional district, represented by Democrat Gil Cisneros and California's 38th congressional district, represented by Democrat Linda Sánchez.

The Los Angeles County Department of Health Services operates the Pomona Health Center in Pomona, serving Industry.

The United States Postal Service City of Industry Post Office is located at 15559 Rausch Rd.

City of Industry's City Council members, composed of five members, are elected at large and the elections are held on a Tuesday after the first Monday in June of odd-numbered years.

=== Transportation ===
The City of Industry is served by Metrolink’s Riverside Line which stops at Industry station. The Riverside Line offers service to Los Angeles Union Station and Riverside–Downtown station.

== Emergency services ==
The Los Angeles County Sheriff's Department operates the Industry Station in the City of Industry.

== Economy ==
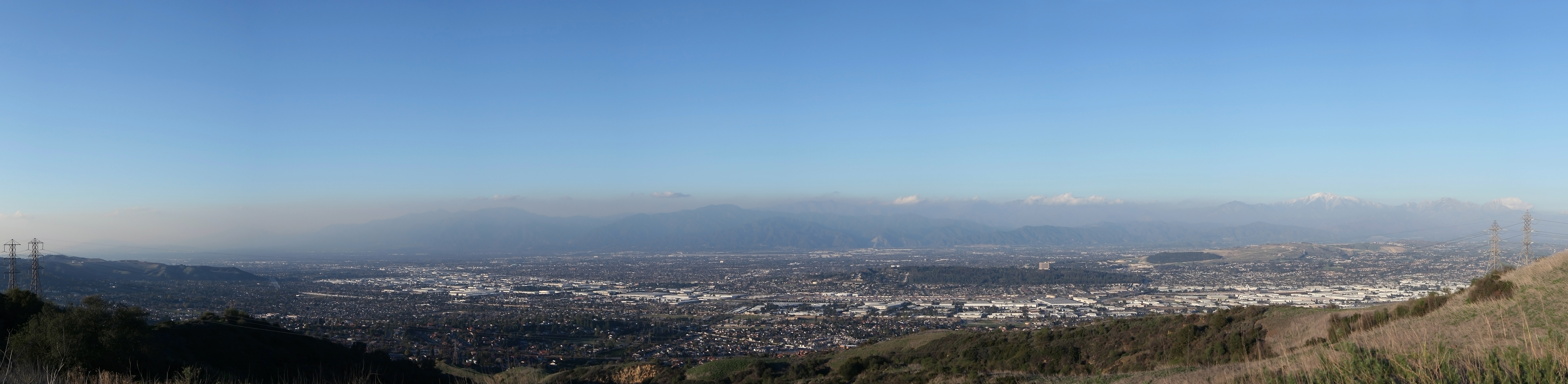
View of the City of Industry

The city's zoning is primarily devoted to business: 92% is industrial, 8% is commercial. The few residences in the city either existed before incorporation, are on properties adjacent to either Industry Hills Golf Club, Industry Hills Recreation Center or in the small neighborhood adjacent to City Hall. In addition, there are residents at the El Encanto Healthcare Center, a nursing home owned by the city.

The City of Industry has no business taxes and is primarily funded through retail sales tax from shopping centers located within the city limits, and property tax on parcels within the city. The city has the highest property tax rate in Los Angeles County, at 1.92%. In addition, there is a revenue-generating hillside hotel resort, known as the Pacific Palms Resort (formerly the Industry Hills Sheraton), which is almost completely surrounded by the city of La Puente but actually located in the City of Industry.

City of Industry is a popular investment area for Chinese businesspeople and the city has also emerged as a high-tech import/export center for computer parts, with business links to the Asian marketplace. For convenience, many Chinese entrepreneurs and staff live in nearby Rowland Heights, Hacienda Heights, West Covina, Diamond Bar and Walnut.

=== Businesses ===
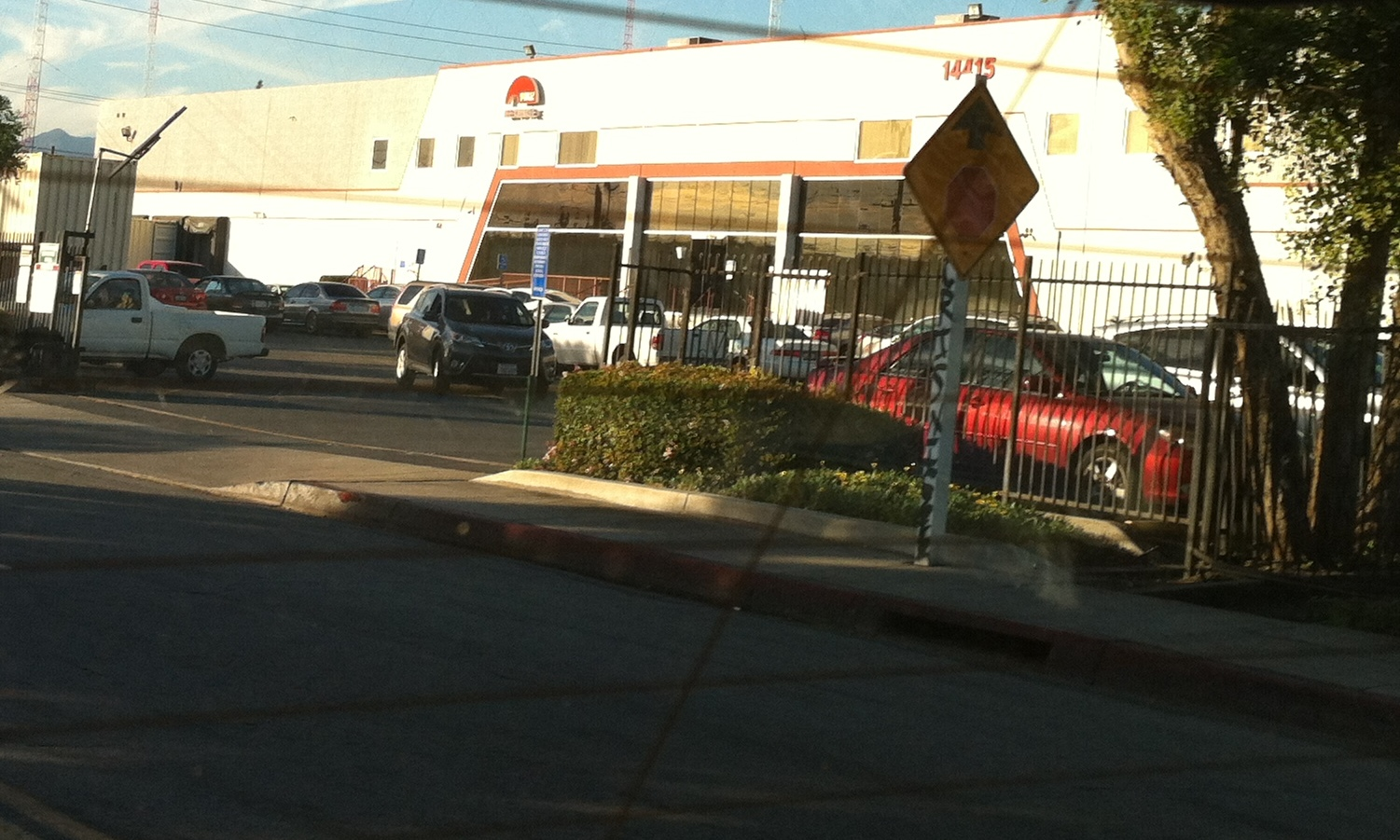
The Lee Kum Kee factory in Industry

Some of the companies with headquarters in the City of Industry are:

- Alta Dena
- AMI ClubWear
- Antec
- Arconic
- CSC Enterprise Corp.
- CyberPowerPC
- Dacor (kitchen appliances)
- DUB
- Emtek Products
- Engineering Model Associates/Plastruct
- Gigabyte Technology Called GBT Co, Ltd. as its corporate name in the United States
- Holosun Technologies
- Hot Topic
- iStarUSA Group
- ITC-Diligence, Inc.
- Jada Toys
- Jointown Pharmaceutical Group
- Medlock Industries
- Metro United Bank (a subsidiary of MetroCorp Bancshares)
- Newegg.com
- NZXT
- Public Health Foundation Enterprises, Inc.
- Serec of California
- Sophos Ltd.
- Utility Trailer Manufacturing Company
- Yum-Yum Donuts

Other businesses with a major presence in the City of Industry include:

- Biostar
- Bank of the West
- CoolerMaster
- DIRECTV
- Fashion Nova
- FedEx
- Golden State Foods (two locations)
- Goya Foods' California division
- Health One Pharmaceuticals
- Kellwood Company
- Lee Kum Kee USA Los Angeles Office
- Micro-Star International stylized as MSI
- Silverstone Technology

== Education ==
The city is served by multiple school districts:

- Whittier City Elementary School District and Whittier Union High School District
- Hacienda La Puente Unified School District
  - Workman High School is in the City of Industry
- Bassett Unified School District
- Rowland Unified School District
- Walnut Valley Unified School District
- Pomona Unified School District

Bishop Amat Memorial High School in La Puente, of the Roman Catholic Archdiocese of Los Angeles, is in proximity to Industry.

Nearby community colleges include Mt. San Antonio College and Rio Hondo College.

== Public safety ==
The Los Angeles County Sheriff's Department has a regional station on Hudson Avenue, just off Hacienda Boulevard which services the city and the neighboring cities of La Habra Heights, La Puente, and the unincorporated communities of Avocado Heights, Valinda, Bassett, Hacienda Heights and North Whittier (Spyglass/Rose Hills). The Los Angeles County Fire Department uses two stations (#118 on Gale Avenue, and Station #43 on Stimson Avenue on the west side of town).

According to the 2011 FBI uniform crime reports, with a population of 222, the City of Industry had 1,136 known property crimes, giving it the highest average per-resident property crime rate (5.117) in California. The average property crime rate for the entire US that year was 0.029. The same report indicates 44 violent crimes, giving it the second highest per-resident violent crime rate (0.198) in California.

== Landmarks ==
The Workman and Temple Family Homestead Museum is a historic house and gardens museum of 19th-century and early-20th-century Southern California history and architecture, and of the generations of the Workman-Temple family that were influential here and in the region. The property is entered on the National Register of Historic Places.

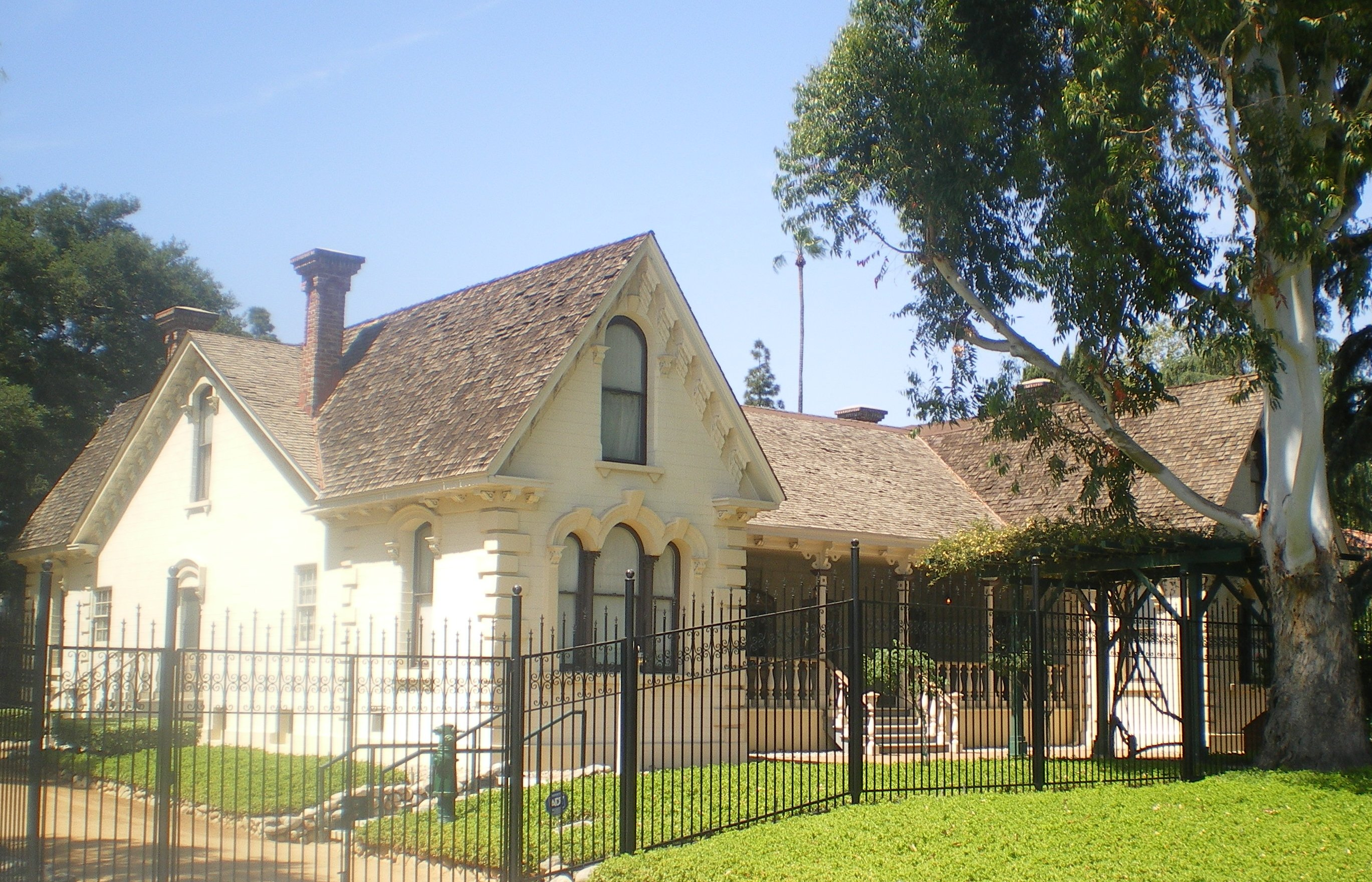
Workman and Temple Family Homestead Museum: the William Workman Home in City of Industry

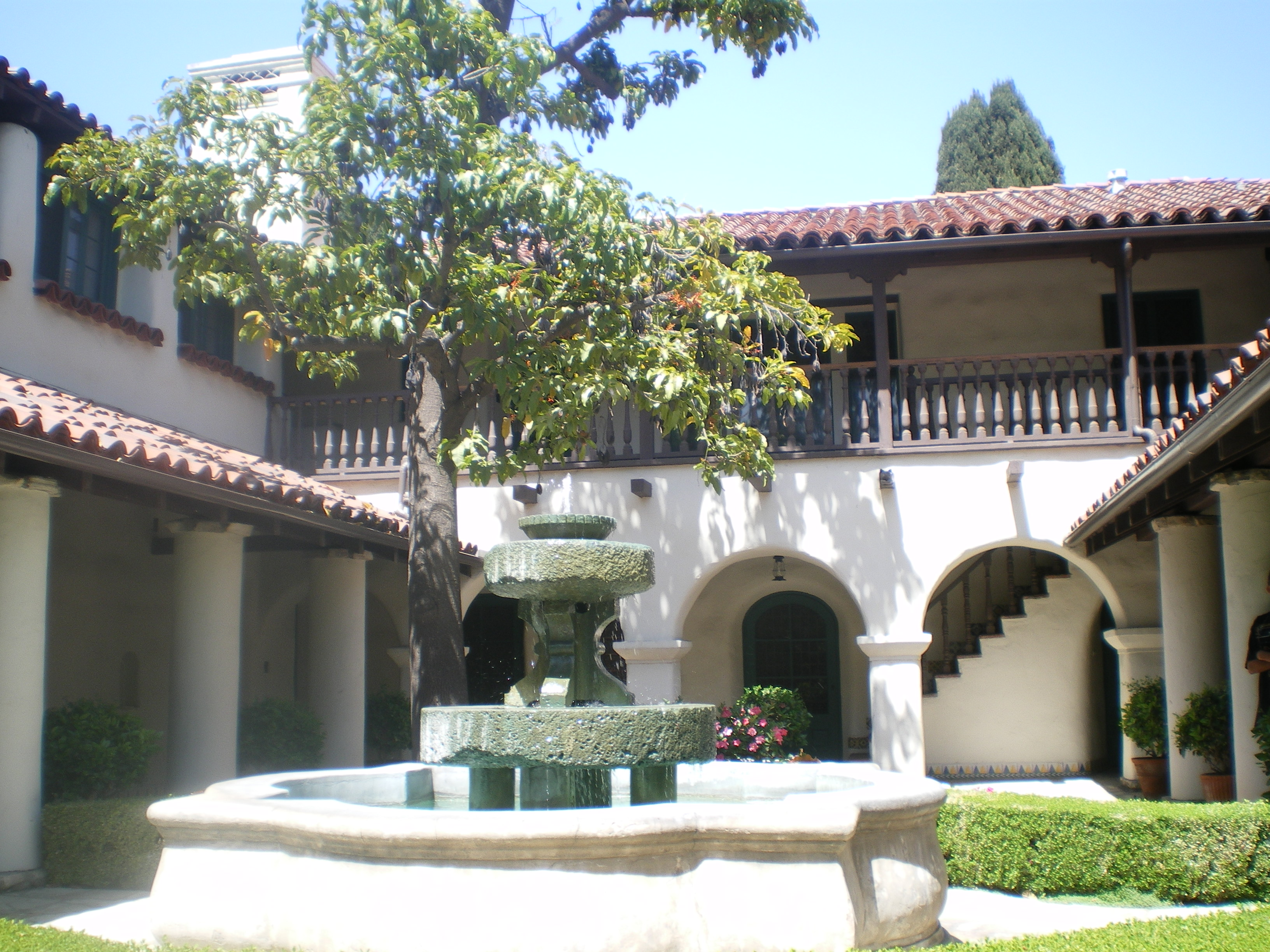
The historic Temple Mansion and gardens at the Workman and Temple Family Homestead Museum in City of Industry

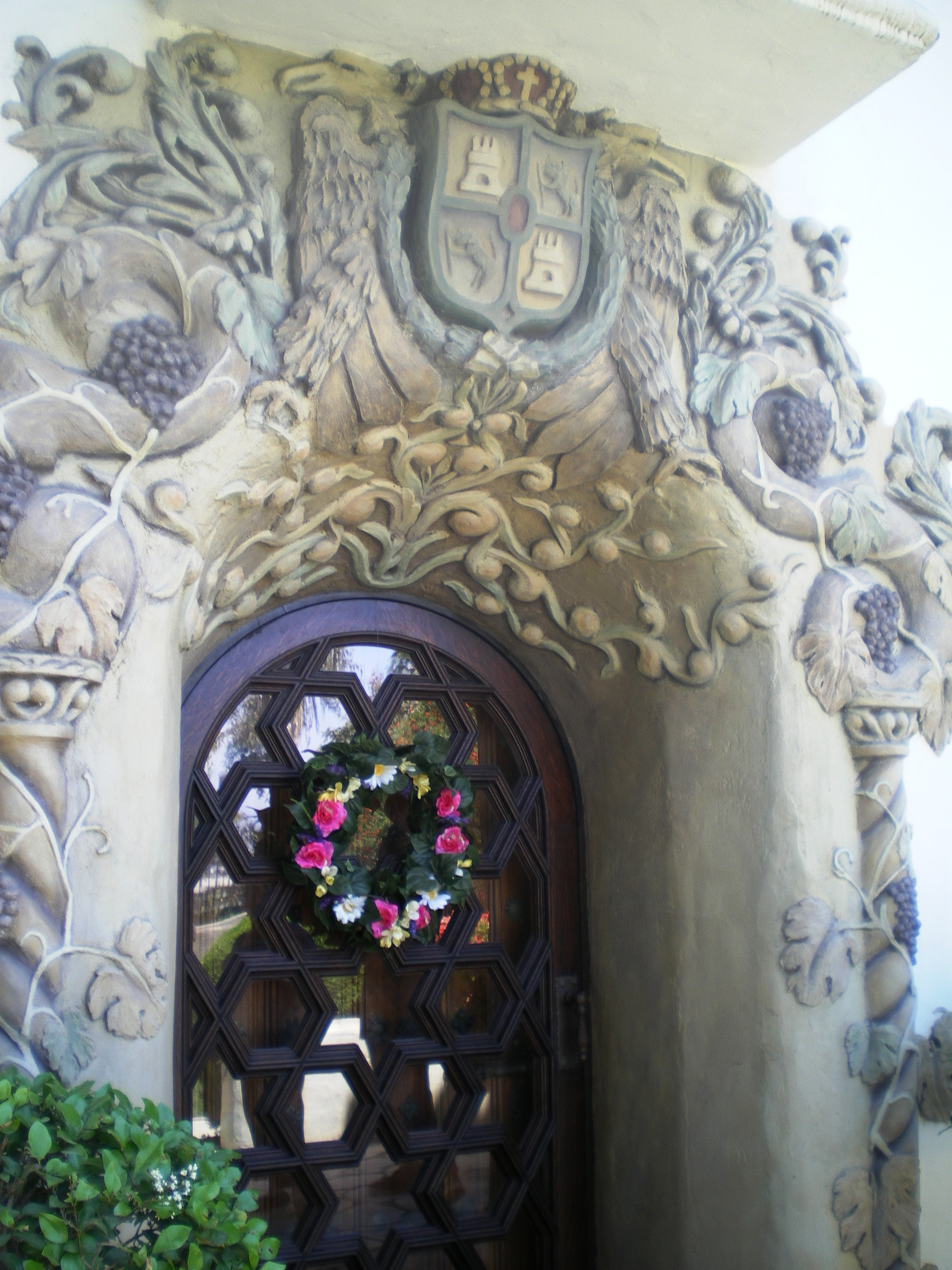
Sculpted plaster entrance to the Temple Mansion

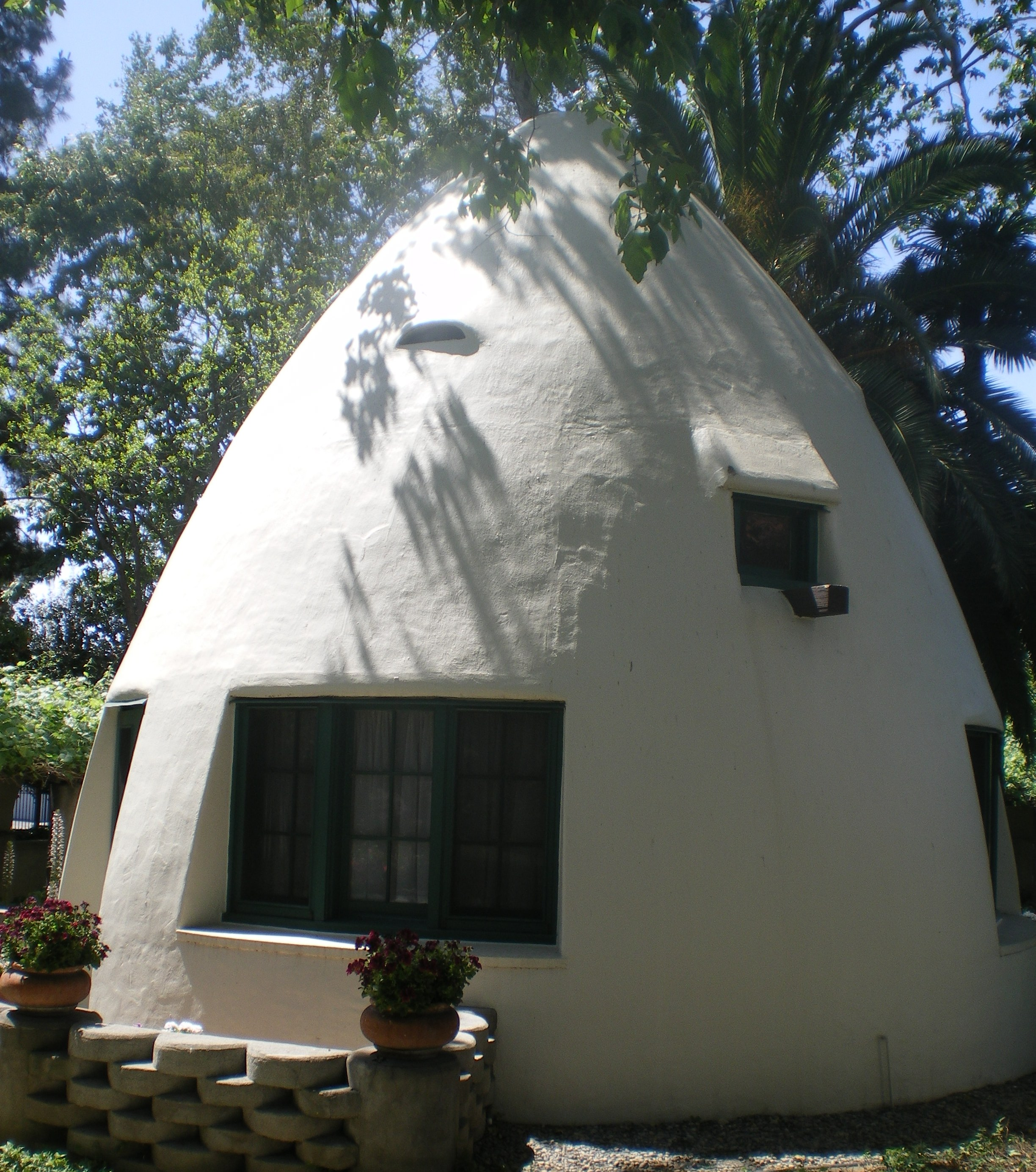
The "Igloo" at the Workman and Temple Family Homestead Museum in City of Industry

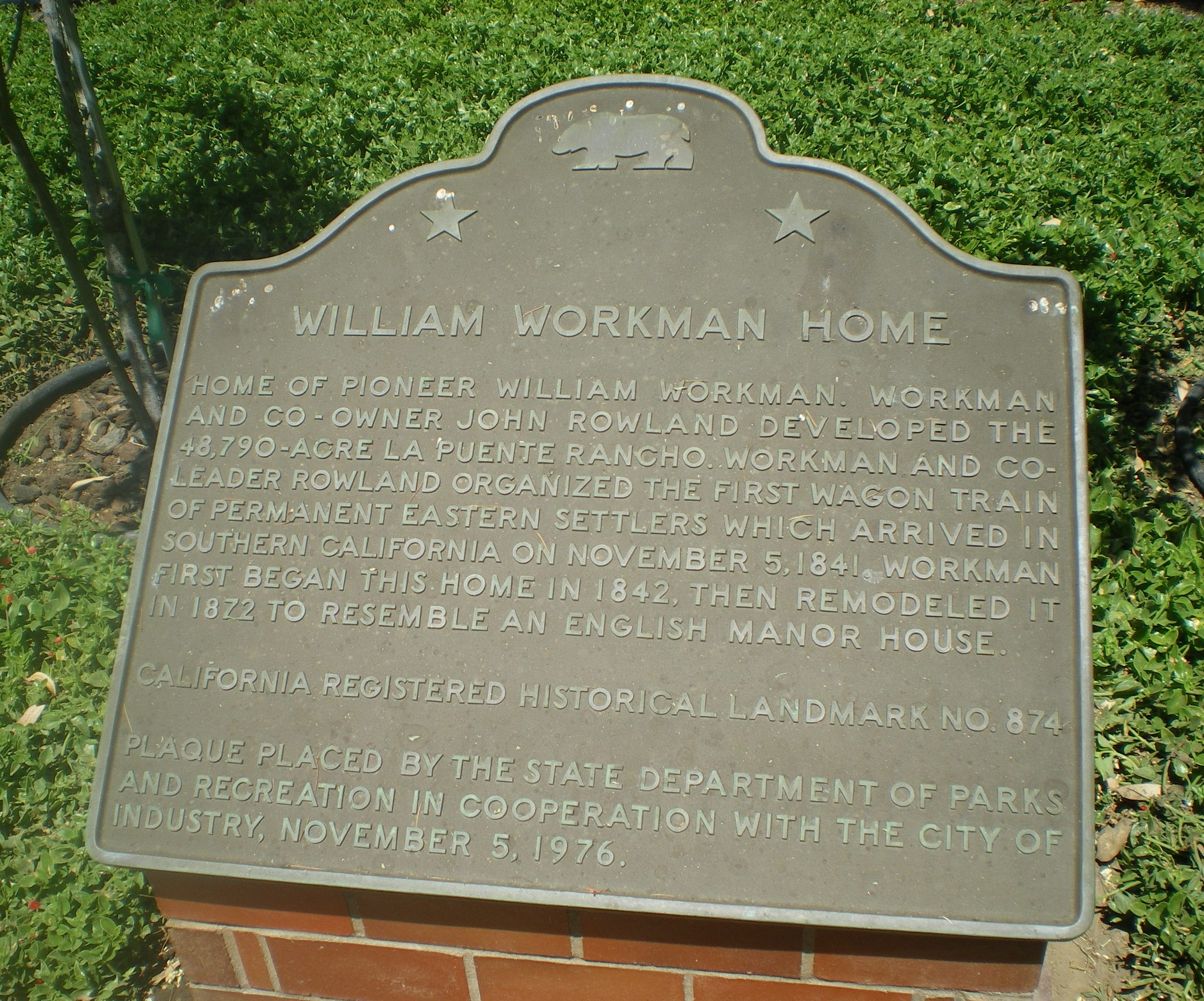
Historical Marker at the Workman and Temple Family Homestead Museum

== Film industry ==
The City of Industry is the home of the Puente Hills Mall, a major shopping center that was the Twin Pines/Lone Pine Mall in the Back to the Future movie series. Adjacent to the mall's property is a SpeedZone entertainment center, which was featured in a prominent scene of Kevin Smith's Clerks II. A former IKEA store (opened as the first STØR location in 1987) located north of the Puente Hills Mall and across the State Route 60 freeway was used as a shooting location for the final fight scene in Mr. & Mrs. Smith. Its exterior was renovated so it could be used for both exterior and interior filming. Another movie called Fun with Dick and Jane was filmed as a fictional retail store KostMart (a parody of Costco Wholesale). The building was later demolished. The IKEA store later moved to a bigger location in Covina, California, which opened in 2003.

The City of Industry also features a fake McDonald's restaurant that is used strictly for filming movies and commercials, which is inside the 30-mile studio zone. Also in the city is Vineland Drive-In, one of only two operating drive-in theaters in Los Angeles and Orange County. The city-owned Industry Hills Expo Center is also used for filming.

== Notable people ==
- Jaime Chavez (born 1987) – soccer player
- Dave Farmer (born 1954) – National Football League (NFL) player
- John A. Rowland (1791–1873) – merchant and rancher who settled in the area of Industry and built the John A. Rowland House
