= Jointown Pharmaceutical Group =

Chinese company

Jointown Pharmaceutical Group Co., Ltd.
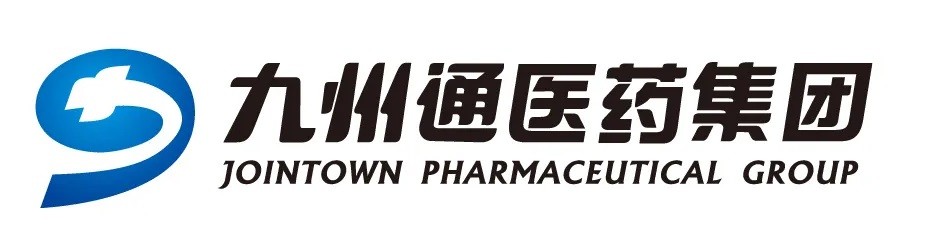

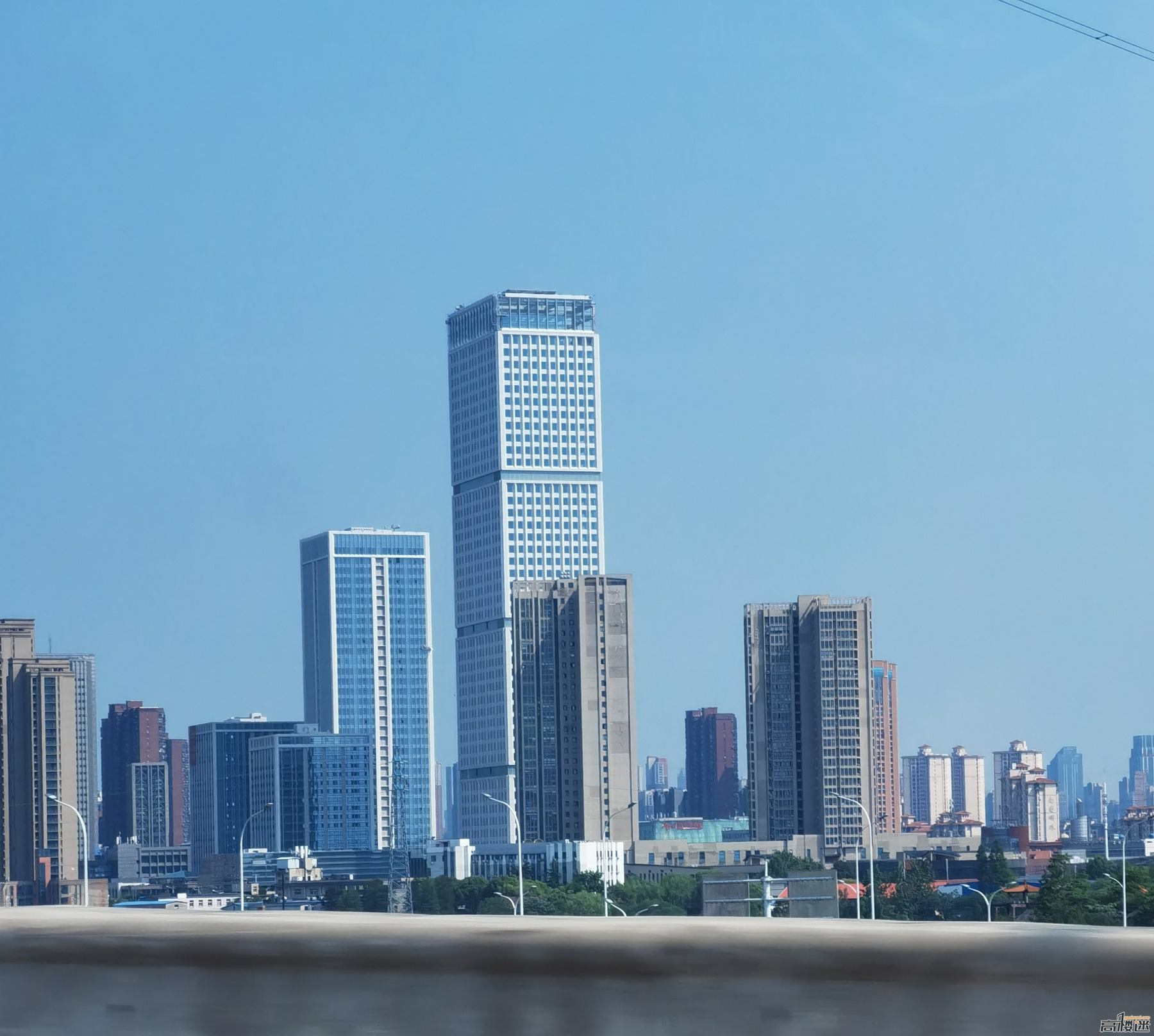
- Global headquarters (the tallest white building)
- Company type: Public
- Traded as: SHA 600998
- Industry: Healthcare
- Founded: 2000
- Founder: Liu Baolin
- Headquarters: Wuhan, China
- Area served: Worldwide
- Key people: Liu Baolin (Founder & Honorable President) Liu Zhaonian (Co-Founder) Liu Shulin (Co-Founder) Liu Changyun (President & CEO)
- Products: Medical and pharmaceutical products and services
- Revenue: ▲US$19.8 billion (2022)
- Number of employees: 29338
- Website: www.jztey.com

Jointown Pharmaceutical Group Co., Ltd. (Chinese: 九州通医药集团) is a publicly traded multinational healthcare services company. By revenue, it is the largest medical company in China that is not state-owned. It is also the 4th largest overall. Its global headquarters are in Wuhan, China and its international headquarters are in Los Angeles, California. The company specializes in the distribution of pharmaceuticals and medical products, distributing more than 510,000 products. The company also manufactures products, including gloves, surgical masks, medical equipment and medications. In addition, it operates the largest network of medical warehouses in China. It is one of the largest in the world, at over 44 million square feet (4.1 million square meters). The company has over 400 subsidiaries and provides medical products to all 31 provinces in mainland China.

== History ==
Founded in 1985 as Swan Pharmaceutical Wholesale (Chinese: 天鹅医药批发部) by Liu Baolin, the company was initially a one-person store that sold medical products in the rural area of Yingcheng, Hubei. A couple of years later, the company moved to Wuhan, the capital city of Hubei and the largest city in Central China.

In 1990, the company expanded outside Hubei and started Qiongying Pharmaceutical Trading in Hainan province.

On March 28, 2000, the 25th anniversary of Swan Pharmaceutical Wholesale, Liu Baolin merged and restructured his companies and officially founded Jointown Pharmaceutical Group.

In 2001, Jointown started operations in Beijing, Henan and Xinjiang. In 2002, Jointown expanded to China's largest city Shanghai. In 2003, Jointown founded its subsidiary in the most populous Chinese province Guangdong. In 2004, Jointown Shandong was founded. In 2005, Jointown Fujian was founded. In 2017, Jointown began in Jiangsu and Chongqing It also received an investment of US$60 million in the same year and started its medical equipment business sector. In 2008, Jointown Jiangxi and Lanzhou were first opened. In 2009, Jointown founded Liaoning and Inner Mongolia subdivisions, reaching the milestone of covering 80% of China's administrative division.

The company went public on the Shanghai Stock Exchange in 2010.

In 2016, Jointown started to explore the overseas market and opened its first facility outside China in the City of Industry, CA, US under the name of Jointown International, which later expanded to New York and Chicago. In 2018, Jointown acquired a New York pharmacy chain Starside Drugs that mainly operates in Queens.

In 2020, during the outbreak of COVID-19, Jointown was a first responder in both China and the US. The company worked 24/7 globally to ensure the supply of PPE and helped stabilize the PPE market. Jointown brand face mask was the best-selling item on Amazon in the US for several consecutive months. The company became the 3rd largest medical distributor in China and ranked 93rd on Fortune 500 China. In 2022, Jointown reached an annual revenue of CN¥140.4 billion (US$19.8 billion).

In 2022, Jointown founded its global e-commerce platform JK.com, Inc. in Long Island City, New York.

Between 2010 and 2021, Jointown maintained an annual revenue increase rate of at least 20%.

== Locations ==
Asia

Jointown operates in all 31 provincial level municipalities in China and 158 cities. It serves 95% land area of China.

North America

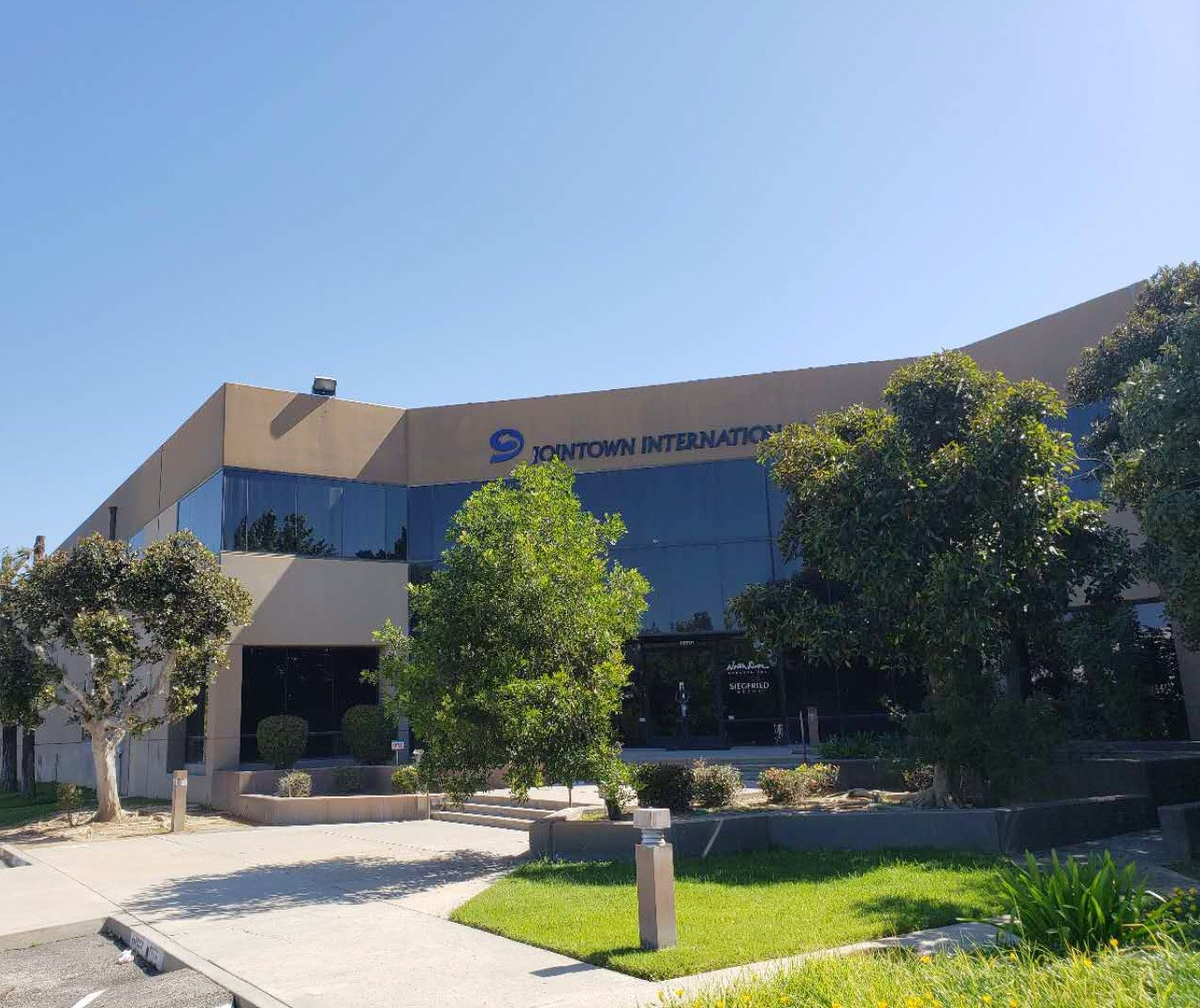
Jointown International Headquarters in Los Angeles

Jointown has offices and warehouses in Los Angeles and New York, and 3 subsidiaries: Jointown International, JK.com and Starside Drugs.

Europe

Jointown has operation in Frankfurt, Germany.

Oceania

Jointown has operation in Melbourne, Australia.

== Business sectors ==
- Pharmaceutical
- Medical Devices
- Medical Supplies
- Pharmacy
- Business to Business Wholesale E-Commerce
- Business to Consumer Retail E-Commerce
- 3rd Party Logistics

== Finances ==
For the fiscal year 2021, Jointown reported an annual revenue of CN¥122.407 billion (US$18.8 billion). increase of 10.41% over the previous fiscal cycle. Jointown's stocks traded at CN¥12.15 per share, and its market capitalization was valued at over CN¥22.66 billion in June 2022.

Year	Revenue in bil. CNY¥	Revenue in bil. USD$
2009	19	2.9
2010	21.3	3.3
2011	24.8	3.8
2012	29.5	4.5
2013	33.4	5.1
2014	44.1	6.8
2015	49.6	7.6
2016	61.6	9.5
2017	73.9	11.4
2018	87.1	13.4
2019	99.5	15.3
2020	110.8	17.0
2021	122.4	18.8
