= Arroyo High School (El Monte, California) =

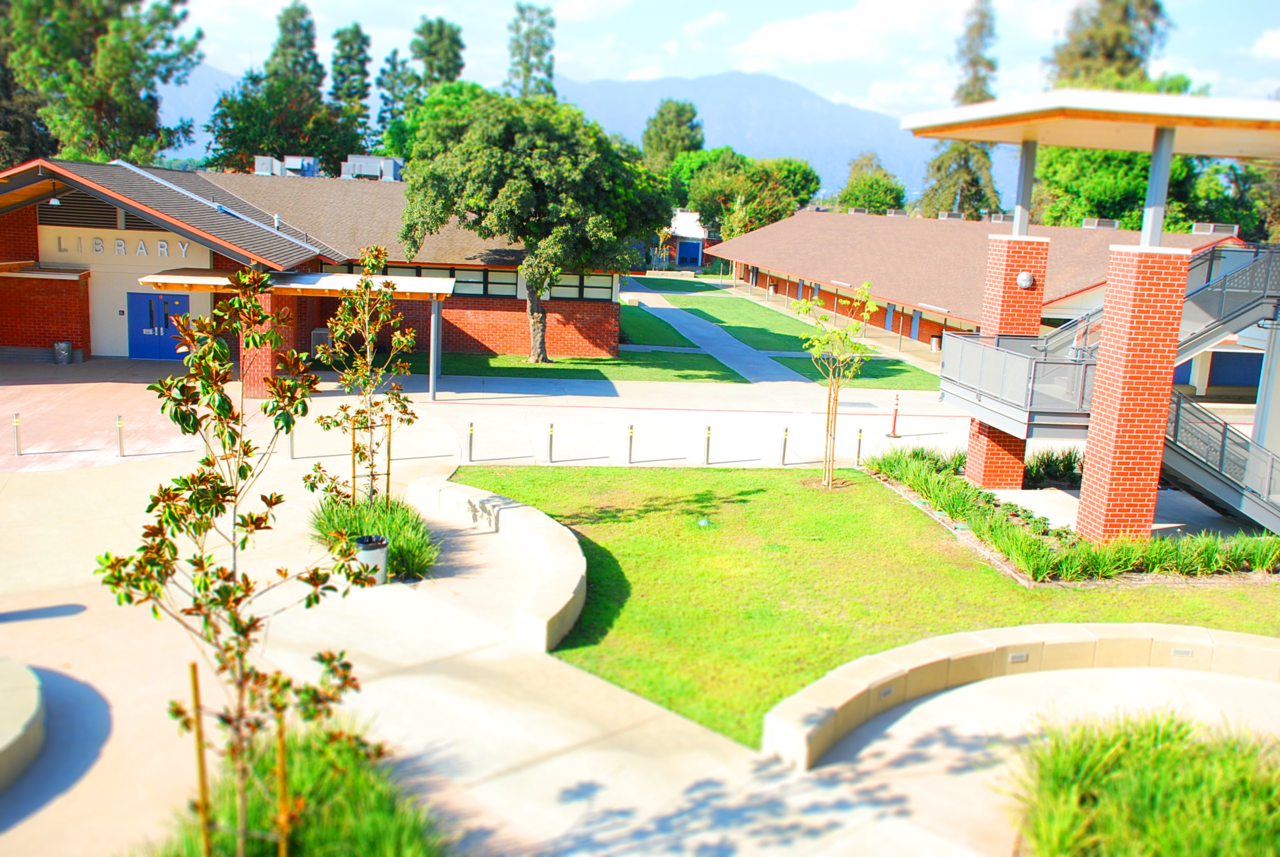

Location
- 4921 North Cedar Avenue; El Monte, California; United States; 34°5′38″N 118°1′14″W

Information
- Type: Public
- Motto: Pursuing Excellence
- Established: 1955
- School district: El Monte Union High School District
- Principal: Dr. Jorge Morales
- Staff: 78.04 (FTE)
- Grades: 9–12
- Student to teacher ratio: 24.18
- Colors: Columbia Blue, White, and Black
- Nickname: Knights
- Rival: Rosemead High School
- Newspaper: Knight's Banner
- Yearbook: Shield
- Website: ahs.emuhsd.org
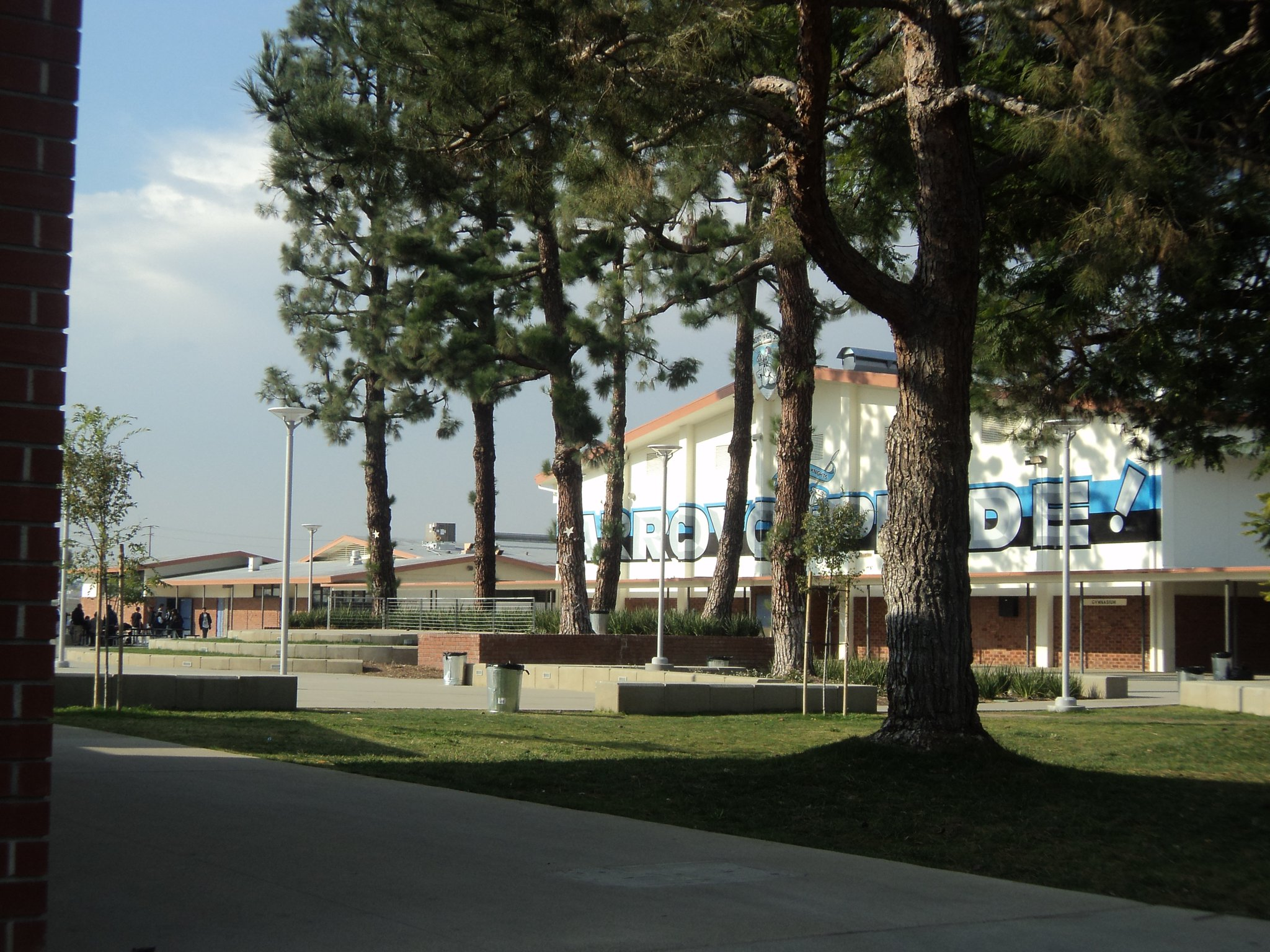

Arroyo High School, located in El Monte, California, United States, is a school in the El Monte Union High School District. The attendance area served by Arroyo High School consists of four different communities: El Monte, Temple City, Arcadia, and an unincorporated area of Los Angeles County.

Arroyo High School's main rival is Rosemead High School.

== History ==
Arroyo High School opened its doors in 1955 and its first graduating class was the class of 1958. Since then, more than 20,000 students have received their high school diplomas from AHS.

== Extracurriculars ==
=== Athletics ===
Arroyo's athletic teams compete in the Mission Valley League, which is part of the CIF Southern Section.

Athletic programs at Arroyo High School include: Football, Cheer, Tennis, Volleyball, Cross Country, Basketball, Soccer, Wrestling, Track and Field, Baseball, and Softball.

=== Performing Arts ===
Arroyo High School offers a variety award-winning performing arts programs, including Drama, Choir, Orchestra, Band, and Color Guard. These programs have showcased their talents at prestigious events across Southern California and throughout the United States.

Arroyo High School's music program consists of three bands: Concert Band, Wind Ensemble, and Symphonic Band. It also consists of four choirs: Treble Choir, Glee Chorus, Acapella Choir, and Chamber Choir.

In the Fall, the marching band and color guard compete in field tournaments and parade band reviews across Southern California.

- In 1973, the marching band performed at the Tournament of Roses Parade in Pasadena, California.
- The band and color guard are 5-time SCSBOA bronze medalists (2016, 2017, 2021, 2022, 2024) and were the 2023 SCSBOA 5A gold medalists.
- In 2014, the Wind Ensemble performed at the John F. Kennedy Center for the Performing Arts in Washington D.C.
- In 2016 and 2024, the Wind Ensemble performed at Carnegie Hall in New York City.
- During the spring, the Chamber Choir performs at the Walt Disney Concert Hall in Los Angeles for the LA Master Chorale High School Festival.

== Academics ==
=== Career Technical Education ===
Arroyo High School offers Career Technical Education (CTE) courses including: Culinary Arts, Business and Finance, Engineering, Stagetech, and Graphic Arts.

These courses prepare students for job and skill certification and career opportunities.

=== Dual Enrollment ===
Arroyo High School also offers dual enrollment courses in partnership with Rio Hondo College to provide students with the opportunity to earn free college credits while earning high school credits at the same time.

=== Foreign Language ===
Arroyo High School offers several foreign language programs, including Spanish and Chinese. Students are required to complete at least 2 years of foreign language courses in order to meet their A-G requirements for eligibility to enter the California State University (CSU) and University of California (UC) system.

=== AP Courses ===
As of 2022, AP courses being offered at Arroyo High School include:

- Biology
- Calculus AB
- Calculus BC
- Chinese Language and Culture
- Computer Science Principles
- English Language and Composition
- English Literature and Composition
- Environmental Science
- Physics 1: Algebra-Based
- Psychology
- Spanish Language and Culture
- Spanish Literature and Culture
- United States History
- United States Government and Politics
- World History

== Notable alumni ==
- Rob Bottin, special effects make-up artist, class of 1977
- Alexandra Hay, actress
- Laura Molina, Chicana artist, actress and musician, class of 1976
- Steven Parent, aka "Stereo Steve", victim of the Charles Manson murders, class of 1969
- Kimberly Rhode double trap and skeet shooter, Olympic medalist winner and national champion, class of 1997
- Javier Vazquez (fighter), wrestler; retired mixed martial artist
- Jackie Warner, Former professional baseball player (California Angels)
- Bob Mackie, Fashion Designer
- David Willman, Pulitzer Prize-winning journalist, class of 1974
