= South El Monte, California =

City in California, United States

- City
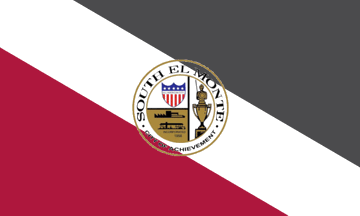
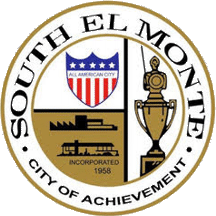
- Flag Seal
- Motto: "Growing Our Future"
- Interactive map of South El Monte, California
- Location in the contiguous United States
- Coordinates: 34°2′56″N 118°2′54″W
- Country: United States
- State: California
- County: Los Angeles
- Incorporated: July 30, 1958

Government
  - Type: Council-Manager
  - Mayor: Gloria Olmos
  - Mayor Pro Tem: Hector Delgado
  - Councilmember: Rudy Bojorquez; Manuel Acosta; Larry Rodriguez
  - City Manager: Rene Salas

Area
  - Total: 2.85 sq mi (7.38 km^{2})
  - Land: 2.84 sq mi (7.36 km^{2})
  - Water: 0.0039 sq mi (0.01 km^{2}) 0.19%
- Elevation: 249 ft (76 m)

Population (2020)
  - Total: 19,567
  - Density: 6,890/sq mi (2,660/km^{2})
- Time zone: UTC-8 (Pacific)
  - Summer (DST): UTC-7 (PDT)
- ZIP code: 91733
- Area code: 626
- FIPS code: 06-72996
- GNIS feature ID: 1656635
- Website: www.cityofsouthelmonte.org

South El Monte is a city in the San Gabriel Valley of Los Angeles County, California, United States. At the 2020 census, the city had a population of 19,567, down from 20,116 at the 2010 census.

== Geography ==
According to the United States Census Bureau, the city has a total area of 2.8 square miles (7.4 km^{2}), virtually all land.

== Demographics ==
Historical population
Census	Pop.	Note	%±
1960	4,850		—
1970	13,443		177.2%
1980	16,623		23.7%
1990	20,850		25.4%
2000	21,144		1.4%
2010	20,116		−4.9%
2020	19,567		−2.7%
U.S. Decennial Census; 1860–1870 1880-1890; 1900 1910 1920; 1930 1940 1950; 1960 1970 1980; 1990 2000 2010; 2020

South El Monte first appeared as a city in the 1960 U.S. census as part of the Upper San Gabriel Valley census county division.

=== Racial and ethnic composition ===
South El Monte city, California – Racial and ethnic composition Note: the US Census treats Hispanic/Latino as an ethnic category. This table excludes Latinos from the racial categories and assigns them to a separate category. Hispanics/Latinos may be of any race.
Race / Ethnicity (NH = Non-Hispanic)	Pop 1980	Pop 1990	Pop 2000	Pop 2010	Pop 2020	% 1980	% 1990	% 2000	% 2010	% 2020
White alone (NH)	3,442	2,056	1,005	683	448	20.71%	9.86%	4.75%	3.40%	2.29%
Black or African American alone (NH)	13	75	29	33	51	0.08%	0.36%	0.14%	0.16%	0.26%
Native American or Alaska Native alone (NH)	18	39	49	24	23	0.11%	0.19%	0.23%	0.12%	0.12%
Asian alone (NH)	193	1,014	1,749	2,179	3,348	1.16%	4.86%	8.27%	10.83%	17.11%
Native Hawaiian or Pacific Islander alone (NH)	193	1,014	20	10	0	1.16%	4.86%	0.09%	0.05%	0.00%
Other race alone (NH)	30	33	13	36	22	0.18%	0.16%	0.06%	0.18%	0.11%
Mixed race or Multiracial (NH)	x	x	89	72	90	x	x	0.42%	0.36%	0.46%
Hispanic or Latino (any race)	12,927	17,633	18,190	17,079	15,585	77.77%	84.57%	86.03%	84.90%	79.65%
Total	16,623	20,850	21,144	20,116	19,567	100.00%	100.00%	100.00%	100.00%	100.00%

=== 2020 census ===
As of the 2020 census, South El Monte had a population of 19,567 and a population density of 6,880.1 inhabitants per square mile (2,656.4/km^{2}). The median age was 35.6 years. 23.7% of residents were under the age of 18 and 12.9% were 65 years of age or older. For every 100 females, there were 100.7 males, and for every 100 females age 18 and over there were 98.5 males age 18 and over.

The census reported that 99.6% of residents lived in households, 0.3% lived in non-institutionalized group quarters, and 0.1% were institutionalized. 100.0% of residents lived in urban areas, while 0.0% lived in rural areas.

There were 4,921 households, of which 47.9% had children under the age of 18 living in them. Of all households, 49.0% were married-couple households, 7.3% were cohabiting couple households, 18.5% had a male householder with no spouse or partner present, and 25.3% had a female householder with no spouse or partner present. About 11.0% of households were made up of individuals, and 4.9% had someone living alone who was 65 years of age or older. The average household size was 3.96. There were 4,103 families, comprising 83.4% of households.

There were 5,058 housing units at an average density of 1,778.5 units per square mile (686.7 units/km^{2}); 2.7% were vacant. Of occupied units, 46.6% were owner-occupied and 53.4% were occupied by renters. The homeowner vacancy rate was 0.8%, and the rental vacancy rate was 2.3%.

=== 2023 ACS 5-year estimate ===
In 2023, the US Census Bureau estimated that the median household income was $67,153, and the per capita income was $22,743. About 19.2% of families and 23.7% of the population were below the poverty line.

=== 2010 census ===
At the 2010 census South El Monte had a population of 20,116. The population density was 7,061.5 inhabitants per square mile (2,726.5/km^{2}). The racial makeup of South El Monte was 10,136 (50.4%) White (3.4% Non-Hispanic White), 107 (0.5%) African American, 250 (1.2%) Native American, 2,211 (11.0%) Asian, 12 (0.1%) Pacific Islander, 6,718 (33.4%) from other races, and 682 (3.4%) from two or more races. Hispanic or Latino of any race were 17,079 persons (84.9%).

The census reported that 20,059 people (99.7% of the population) lived in households, 47 (0.2%) lived in non-institutionalized group quarters, and 10 (0%) were institutionalized.

There were 4,569 households, 2,643 (57.8%) had children under the age of 18 living in them, 2,554 (55.9%) were opposite-sex married couples living together, 925 (20.2%) had a female householder with no husband present, 524 (11.5%) had a male householder with no wife present. There were 329 (7.2%) unmarried opposite-sex partnerships, and 21 (0.5%) same-sex married couples or partnerships. 397 households (8.7%) were one person and 208 (4.6%) had someone living alone who was 65 or older. The average household size was 4.39. There were 4,003 families (87.6% of households); the average family size was 4.45.

The age distribution was 6,041 people (30.0%) under the age of 18, 2,323 people (11.5%) aged 18 to 24, 5,894 people (29.3%) aged 25 to 44, 4,062 people (20.2%) aged 45 to 64, and 1,796 people (8.9%) who were 65 or older. The median age was 30.4 years. For every 100 females, there were 101.9 males. For every 100 females age 18 and over, there were 101.2 males.

There were 4,711 housing units at an average density of 1,653.7 per square mile, of the occupied units 2,208 (48.3%) were owner-occupied and 2,361 (51.7%) were rented. The homeowner vacancy rate was 0.7%; the rental vacancy rate was 3.5%. 9,304 people (46.3% of the population) lived in owner-occupied housing units and 10,755 people (53.5%) lived in rental housing units.

According to the 2010 United States Census, South El Monte had a median household income of $44,104, with 19.4% of the population living below the federal poverty line.

== Education ==
Elementary school districts include:

- El Monte City School District
  - Loma Elementary School
  - Potrero Elementary School
- Mountain View School District
  - Miramonte Elementary School
  - Monte Vista Elementary School
- Valle Lindo School District
  - New Temple Elementary School
  - Dean L. Shively Elementary School

The El Monte Union High School District operates South El Monte High School.

Private Schools:

- Epiphany Catholic School

== Government ==
The City of South El Monte has four Council members elected at large for a term of four years. The Mayor is elected at large for a term of four years.

The South El Monte City Council consists of:

- Mayor Gloria Olmos
- Mayor Pro Tem Rudy Bojorquez
- Councilmember Hector Delgado
- Councilmember Manny Acosta
- Councilmember Larry Rodriguez

=== State and federal representation ===
In the state legislature South El Monte is in the 22nd senatorial district, represented by Democrat Susan Rubio and the 56th Assembly district, represented by Democrat Lisa Calderon.

In the United States House of Representatives, South El Monte is in California's 31st congressional district, represented by Democrat Gil Cisneros.

== Media ==
South El Monte community news is provided by the San Gabriel Valley Tribune.

== Infrastructure ==
=== Public safety ===
The Los Angeles County Sheriff's Department (LASD) operates the Temple Station in Temple City, serving South El Monte.

==== Fire ====
The Los Angeles County Fire Department provides fire protection services for the city of South El Monte.
