= El Monte =

El Monte (Spanish for "the Mountain", also in archaic Spanish for "the wood") may refer to:

- El Monte, California, United States, a city
- El Monte, Chile, a city

== See also ==
- El Monte station (Los Angeles Metro), a bus station in El Monte, California
- El Monte station (Metrolink), a commuter rail station in El Monte, California
