= El Monte High School =

Coordinates: 34.064642°N 118.033456°W

Location
- 3048 Tyler Ave. El Monte, California 91731

Information
- School type: Public
- Motto: One school, One team
- Established: 1901
- School district: El Monte Union High School District
- Principal: Eddie Cuevas
- Teaching staff: 80.28 (FTE)
- Grades: 9 – 12
- Enrollment: 1,738 (2018–19)
- Student to teacher ratio: 21.65
- Campus size: 28 acres
- Campus type: Suburban
- Colors: Blue and White
- Fight song: Our Director
- Athletics conference: CIF Southern Section; Mission Valley League
- Nickname: Home of the Lions
- Rivals: South El Monte High School; Arroyo High School; Mountain View High School
- Communities served: Central and parts of Western El Monte
- Feeder schools: Columbia School; Kranz Intermediate School

El Monte High School in El Monte, California, is a public high school of the El Monte Union High School District. It is one of the oldest high schools in the San Gabriel Valley. Founded in 1901, it began operation in a single, upstairs classroom in the old Lexington Avenue Grammar School, with an enrollment of 12-15 students. By 1908, the high school had its own campus and 65 students. Today, enrollment is approximately 2000. Over 80% of students are of Hispanic origin and over 17% are characterized as Asian/Pacific Islander.

== Notable alumni ==
- Davon Booth, NFL running back for the Cleveland Browns
- Don Cheto, Mexican American radio and television personality, comedian
- Doug Griffin, Major League Baseball player
- Don Johnson, basketball player and coach
- Lance Larson, Olympic swimming gold and silver medalist
- Fred Lynn, Major League Baseball player
- Tom Morgan, Major League Baseball player
- Leonard Nathan, poet
- Sandra Neilson, Olympic swimming 3-time gold medalist
- William W. Norton, screenwriter
- Albie Pearson, Major League Baseball player
- Felipe Rodriguez, retired soccer player
- Joseph Tommasi, neo-Nazi
- Bill Shoemaker, horse racing Hall of Fame jockey, did not graduate
