= Mayflower Village, California =

- census-designated place
- Location of Mayflower Village in Los Angeles County, California.

- Location in the United States
- Coordinates: 34°7′4″N 118°0′34″W
- Country: United States
- State: California
- County: Los Angeles

Area
  - Total: 0.686 sq mi (1.777 km^{2})
  - Land: 0.686 sq mi (1.777 km^{2})
  - Water: 0 sq mi (0 km^{2}) 0%
- Elevation: 367 ft (112 m)

Population (2020)
  - Total: 5,402
  - Density: 7,873/sq mi (3,040/km^{2})
- Time zone: UTC-8 (PST)
  - Summer (DST): UTC-7 (PDT)
- ZIP code: 91006 & 91016
- Area code: 626
- FIPS code: 06-46436
- GNIS feature ID: 1867040

Mayflower Village is a census-designated place (CDP) in the San Gabriel Valley of Los Angeles County, California, United States. The population was 5,402 at the 2020 census, down from 5,515 at the 2010 census. The ZIP Codes serving the community are 91006, which is served by Arcadia and 91016, which is served by Monrovia.

== Geography ==
According to the United States Census Bureau, the CDP has a total area of 0.7 square miles (1.8 km^{2}), all land.

== Demographics ==
Historical population
Census	Pop.	Note	%±
1980	5,017		—
1990	4,978		−0.8%
2000	5,081		2.1%
2010	5,515		8.5%
2020	5,402		−2.0%
U.S. Decennial Census; 1850–1870 1880-1890; 1900 1910 1920; 1930 1940 1950; 1960 1970 1980; 1990 2000 2010; 2020

Mayflower Village first appeared as a census designated place in the 1980 United States census. Prior to that, it was part of the unincorporated portion of the Upper San Gabriel Valley census county division.

=== Racial and ethnic composition ===
Mayflower Village CDP, California – Racial and ethnic composition Note: the US Census treats Hispanic/Latino as an ethnic category. This table excludes Latinos from the racial categories and assigns them to a separate category. Hispanics/Latinos may be of any race.
Race / Ethnicity (NH = Non-Hispanic)	Pop 2000	Pop 2010	Pop 2020	% 2000	% 2010	% 2020
White alone (NH)	2,680	2,047	1,469	52.75%	37.12%	27.19%
Black or African American alone (NH)	54	76	63	1.06%	1.38%	1.17%
Native American or Alaska Native alone (NH)	9	10	9	0.18%	0.18%	0.17%
Asian alone (NH)	837	1,711	2,127	16.47%	31.02%	39.37%
Native Hawaiian or Pacific Islander alone (NH)	7	4	1	0.14%	0.07%	0.02%
Other race alone (NH)	13	9	23	0.26%	0.16%	0.43%
Mixed race or Multiracial (NH)	129	137	203	2.54%	2.48%	3.76%
Hispanic or Latino (any race)	1,352	1,521	1,507	26.61%	27.58%	27.90%
Total	5,081	5,515	5,402	100.00%	100.00%	100.00%

=== 2020 census ===
As of the 2020 census, Mayflower Village had a population of 5,402 and a population density of 7,874.6 inhabitants per square mile (3,040.4/km^{2}). The median age was 44.0 years. 18.6% of residents were under the age of 18, 7.8% were aged 18 to 24, 24.5% were aged 25 to 44, 29.7% were aged 45 to 64, and 19.4% were 65 years of age or older. For every 100 females there were 90.8 males, and for every 100 females age 18 and over there were 88.3 males age 18 and over.

The census reported that 99.7% of the population lived in households, 0.3% lived in non-institutionalized group quarters, and no one was institutionalized. 100.0% of residents lived in urban areas, while 0.0% lived in rural areas.

There were 1,853 households, of which 29.5% had children under the age of 18 living in them. Of all households, 53.8% were married-couple households, 4.3% were cohabiting couple households, 26.4% had a female householder with no partner present, and 15.5% had a male householder with no partner present. About 20.8% of households were one person, and 11.8% had someone living alone who was 65 years of age or older. The average household size was 2.91. There were 1,376 families (74.3% of all households).

There were 1,916 housing units at an average density of 2,793.0 units per square mile (1,078.4 units/km^{2}); 3.3% of housing units were vacant. The homeowner vacancy rate was 0.9%, and the rental vacancy rate was 4.6%. Of occupied housing units, 76.8% were owner-occupied and 23.2% were occupied by renters.

=== Income and poverty ===
In 2023, the US Census Bureau estimated that the median household income was $95,521, and the per capita income was $39,146. About 3.9% of families and 8.5% of the population were below the poverty line.

=== 2010 census ===
At the 2010 census Mayflower Village had a population of 5,515. The population density was 8,030.2 inhabitants per square mile (3,100.5/km^{2}). The racial makeup of Mayflower Village was 2,929 (53.1%) White (37.1% Non-Hispanic White), 83 (1.5%) African American, 28 (0.5%) Native American, 1,734 (31.4%) Asian, 4 (0.1%) Pacific Islander, 491 (8.9%) from other races, and 246 (4.5%) from two or more races. Hispanic or Latino of any race were 1,521 persons (27.6%).

The census reported that 5,511 people (99.9% of the population) lived in households, 4 (0.1%) lived in non-institutionalized group quarters, and no one was institutionalized.

There were 1,905 households, 656 (34.4%) had children under the age of 18 living in them, 1,078 (56.6%) were opposite-sex married couples living together, 249 (13.1%) had a female householder with no husband present, 98 (5.1%) had a male householder with no wife present. There were 81 (4.3%) unmarried opposite-sex partnerships, and 9 (0.5%) same-sex married couples or partnerships. 385 households (20.2%) were one person and 177 (9.3%) had someone living alone who was 65 or older. The average household size was 2.89. There were 1,425 families (74.8% of households); the average family size was 3.34.

The age distribution was 1,197 people (21.7%) under the age of 18, 435 people (7.9%) aged 18 to 24, 1,433 people (26.0%) aged 25 to 44, 1,692 people (30.7%) aged 45 to 64, and 758 people (13.7%) who were 65 or older. The median age was 41.1 years. For every 100 females, there were 92.5 males. For every 100 females age 18 and over, there were 89.7 males.

There were 1,975 housing units at an average density of 2,875.7 per square mile, of the occupied units 1,559 (81.8%) were owner-occupied and 346 (18.2%) were rented. The homeowner vacancy rate was 1.0%; the rental vacancy rate was 6.0%. 4,464 people (80.9% of the population) lived in owner-occupied housing units and 1,047 people (19.0%) lived in rental housing units.

According to the 2010 United States Census, Mayflower Village had a median household income of $76,461, with 5.6% of the population living below the federal poverty line.

== Government ==
In the California State Senate, Mayflower Village is in the 25th senatorial district, represented by Democrat Sasha Renée Pérez. In the California State Assembly, it is in the 48th Assembly district, represented by Democrat Blanca Rubio.

In the United States House of Representatives, Mayflower Village is in California's 31st congressional district, represented by Democrat Gil Cisneros.

== Education ==
Most of Mayflower Village is served by the Monrovia Unified School District, while a southern portion is served by the El Monte City School District and by the El Monte Union High School District.
