= Mountain View School District =

Mountain View School District may refer to:

- Mountain View School District (Arkansas), Mountain View, Arkansas
- Mountain View School District (Los Angeles County, California), a public school district based in Los Angeles County, California, United States
- Mountain View School District (San Bernardino County, California)
- Mountain View High School (Idaho)
- Mountain View School District (Pennsylvania), Susquehanna County, Pennsylvania
