= Mountain View High School (El Monte, California) =

Location
- 2900 Parkway Drive; El Monte, California 91732; United States

Information
- Type: Public
- Motto: Inspire Greatness
- Established: 1971; 55 years ago
- School district: El Monte Union High School District
- Principal: Jose Relson Banas
- Teaching staff: 68.05 (FTE)
- Grades: 9-12
- Enrollment: 1,347 (2018–19)
- Student to teacher ratio: 19.79
- Schedule type: Blocked
- Campus size: 45 acres
- Campus type: Suburban
- Colors: Purple, Gold, Black, and White
- Fight song: Go U Northwestern Bravura
- Athletics conference: CIF Southern Section; Mission Valley League SCSBOA
- Nickname: Vikings
- Rivals: El Monte High School, South El Monte High School
- Newspaper: Viking Scroll
- Website: www.emuhsd.org/mvhs

Mountain View High School is a 4-year public high school in the El Monte Union High School District, in the city of El Monte, California, United States. It was established in 1971 along the city's eastern boundary.

The attendance boundaries of the school roughly consist of Lambert Ave. to the North, Peck Rd. and Mountain View Rd. to the West, Rush St. to the South, and the San Gabriel River to the East.

The school's campus is located on a slope adjacent to the San Gabriel River with a clear line of sight towards the San Gabriel Mountains, which the school derives its name from.

== History ==
On 31 January 2013, a fire, reported at about 2:30 am, burned down the cafeteria building, which also housed the student store, commission room for the associated student body, activities office, and maintenance garage.

== New cafeteria ==
Hundreds of El Monte Union students, staff, alumni and community members gathered at Mountain View High School on Jan. 23 to celebrate the grand opening of the Bobby Salcedo Student Union – named in honor of former student, beloved teacher and successful administrator Agustin Roberto “Bobby” Salcedo. The festive celebration included a ribbon-cutting and name unveiling ceremony of the 30,000-square-foot facility, which will house the school's much-anticipated cafeteria and kitchen, as well as a multipurpose room, Associated Student Body (ASB) meeting spaces and a student store. Mountain View's former cafeteria was destroyed by fire in January 2013.
