= Felipe Rodriguez (soccer, born 1975) =

American soccer player

Personal information
- Date of birth: September 12, 1975 (age 51)
- Place of birth: El Monte, California, U.S.
- Height: 5 ft 7 in (1.70 m)
- Position: Midfielder

Youth career
- 1992: Standard Liège

Senior career*
Years	Team	Apps	(Gls)
1993	Montclair Standard Falcons		
1994	Querétaro		
1995	Pumas		
1996	Colorado Rapids	10	(0)
1997	Los Angeles Galaxy	0	(0)
1997–1998	Orange County Zodiac		

Managerial career
- El Monte High School
- * Club domestic league appearances and goals

Felipe Rodriguez (born September 12, 1975) is an American retired soccer midfielder who played for the Colorado Rapids of Major League Soccer in 1996.

In 1992, Rodriguez spent a year in the Standard Liège youth system. He then returned to the United States and graduated from El Monte High School. In 1993, he played for the Montclair Standard Falcons in the USISL. In 1994, he moved to Mexico and signed with Querétaro FC in the Second Division. At some point during the season, he moved to the UNAM Pumas in the Primera División de México. In February 1996, the Colorado Rapids selected Rodriguez in the 10th round (92nd overall) of the 1996 MLS Inaugural Player Draft. He played ten games for the Rapids. In August, he injured his left hip flexor which forced him to miss several games. On November 8, 1996, the Rapids traded Rodriguez to the Los Angeles Galaxy in exchange for a potential 1997 draft pick. He never played a first game with the Galaxy before moving to the Orange County Zodiac of the USISL. He played the 1997 and 1998 season with the Zodiac.

Since retiring from playing, Rodriguez has coached youth soccer. He is currently the Director of Technical Training with the Cresecenta Valley Soccer Club, as well as representing the club in various coaching capacities.
