= North El Monte, California =

- Census-designated place
- Location of North El Monte in Los Angeles County, California

- Location in the United States
- Coordinates: 34°6′11″N 118°1′24″W
- Country: United States
- State: California
- County: Los Angeles

Area
  - Total: 0.425 sq mi (1.102 km^{2})
  - Land: 0.425 sq mi (1.102 km^{2})
  - Water: 0 sq mi (0 km^{2}) 0%
- Elevation: 331 ft (101 m)

Population (2020)
  - Total: 3,730
  - Density: 8,770/sq mi (3,380/km^{2})
- Time zone: UTC-8 (PST)
  - Summer (DST): UTC-7 (PDT)
- ZIP code: 91006
- Area code: 626
- FIPS code: 06-51820
- GNIS feature ID: 1867046

North El Monte is a census-designated place (CDP) in the San Gabriel Valley, in Los Angeles County, California, United States. The population was 3,730 at the 2020 census, up from 3,723 at the 2010 census.

== Geography ==
According to the United States Census Bureau, the CDP has a total area of 0.4 square miles (1.0 km^{2}), all land.

== Demographics ==
Historical population
Census	Pop.	Note	%±
1990	3,384		—
2000	3,703		9.4%
2010	3,723		0.5%
2020	3,730		0.2%
U.S. Decennial Census; 1860–1870 1880-1890; 1900 1910 1920; 1930 1940 1950; 1960 1970 1980; 1990 2000 2010; 2020

North El Monte first appeared as a census designated place in the 1990 U.S. census as part of the Upper San Gabriel Valley census county division.

=== Racial and ethnic composition ===
North El Monte CDP, California – Racial and ethnic composition Note: the US Census treats Hispanic/Latino as an ethnic category. This table excludes Latinos from the racial categories and assigns them to a separate category. Hispanics/Latinos may be of any race.
Race / Ethnicity (NH = Non-Hispanic)	Pop 2000	Pop 2010	Pop 2020	% 2000	% 2010	% 2020
White alone (NH)	2,302	1,193	793	38.08%	32.04%	21.26%
Black or African American alone (NH)	144	27	65	2.38%	0.73%	1.74%
Native American or Alaska Native alone (NH)	20	3	5	0.33%	0.08%	0.13%
Asian alone (NH)	1,207	1,431	1,697	19.97%	38.44%	45.50%
Native Hawaiian or Pacific Islander alone (NH)	3	4	0	0.05%	0.11%	0.00%
Other race alone (NH)	6	2	11	0.10%	0.05%	0.29%
Mixed race or Multiracial (NH)	233	61	80	3.85%	1.64%	2.14%
Hispanic or Latino (any race)	2,130	1,002	1,079	35.24%	26.91%	28.93%
Total	6,045	3,723	3,730	100.00%	100.00%	100.00%

=== 2020 census ===
As of the 2020 census, North El Monte had a population of 3,730. The median age was 46.7 years. 16.4% of residents were under the age of 18 and 23.2% were 65 years of age or older. For every 100 females, there were 89.4 males, and for every 100 females age 18 and over, there were 88.1 males.

100.0% of residents lived in urban areas, while 0.0% lived in rural areas.

There were 1,275 households, of which 29.6% had children under the age of 18 living in them. Of all households, 54.4% were married-couple households, 12.9% were households with a male householder and no spouse or partner present, and 27.8% were households with a female householder and no spouse or partner present. About 18.2% of all households were made up of individuals, and 10.3% had someone living alone who was 65 years of age or older.

There were 1,311 housing units, of which 2.7% were vacant. The homeowner vacancy rate was 1.2%, and the rental vacancy rate was 2.9%.

=== 2010 census ===
At the 2010 census North El Monte had a population of 3,723. The population density was 8,794.7 inhabitants per square mile (3,395.7/km^{2}). The racial makeup of North El Monte was 1,768 (47.5%) White (32.0% Non-Hispanic White), 33 (0.9%) African American, 13 (0.3%) Native American, 1,437 (38.6%) Asian, 4 (0.1%) Pacific Islander, 336 (9.0%) from other races, and 132 (3.5%) from two or more races. Hispanic or Latino of any race were 1,002 persons (26.9%).

The census reported that 3,669 people (98.5% of the population) lived in households, no one lived in non-institutionalized group quarters and 54 (1.5%) were institutionalized.

There were 1,254 households, 426 (34.0%) had children under the age of 18 living in them, 747 (59.6%) were opposite-sex married couples living together, 163 (13.0%) had a female householder with no husband present, 56 (4.5%) had a male householder with no wife present. There were 46 (3.7%) unmarried opposite-sex partnerships, and 5 (0.4%) same-sex married couples or partnerships. 218 households (17.4%) were one person and 99 (7.9%) had someone living alone who was 65 or older. The average household size was 2.93. There were 966 families (77.0% of households); the average family size was 3.31.

The age distribution was 742 people (19.9%) under the age of 18, 301 people (8.1%) aged 18 to 24, 962 people (25.8%) aged 25 to 44, 1,109 people (29.8%) aged 45 to 64, and 609 people (16.4%) who were 65 or older. The median age was 42.2 years. For every 100 females, there were 92.1 males. For every 100 females age 18 and over, there were 90.6 males.

There were 1,304 housing units at an average density of 3,080.4 per square mile, of the occupied units 945 (75.4%) were owner-occupied and 309 (24.6%) were rented. The homeowner vacancy rate was 0.6%; the rental vacancy rate was 5.2%. 2,761 people (74.2% of the population) lived in owner-occupied housing units and 908 people (24.4%) lived in rental housing units.

According to the 2010 United States Census, North El Monte had a median household income of $63,750, with 5.8% of the population living below the federal poverty line.

=== 2000 census ===
At the 2000 census there were 3,703 people, 1,270 households, and 994 families in the CDP. The population density was 8,751.9 inhabitants per square mile (3,379.1/km^{2}). There were 1,302 housing units at an average density of 3,077.2 per square mile (1,188.1/km^{2}). The racial makeup of the CDP was 49.76% White, 0.76% African American, 0.27% Native American, 52.17% Asian, 0.05% Pacific Islander, 10.21% from other races, and 2.78% from two or more races. Hispanic or Latino of any race were 15.28%.

Of the 1,270 households 32.8% had children under the age of 18 living with them, 61.0% were married couples living together, 11.5% had a female householder with no husband present, and 21.7% were non-families. 17.9% of households were one person and 8.6% were one person aged 65 or older. The average household size was 2.87 and the average family size was 3.23.

The age distribution was 23.0% under the age of 18, 6.9% from 18 to 24, 29.9% from 25 to 44, 23.8% from 45 to 64, and 16.4% 65 or older. The median age was 39 years. For every 100 females, there were 91.8 males. For every 100 females age 18 and over, there were 88.6 males.

The median household income was $48,583 and the median family income was $80,000. Males had a median income of $45,195 versus $28,125 for females. The per capita income for the CDP was $19,192. About 6.2% of families and 7.4% of the population were below the poverty line, including 14.4% of those under age 18 and 4.5% of those age 65 or over.

== Government ==
In the state legislature North El Monte is located in the 22nd Senate District, represented by Democrat Susan Rubio, and in the 49th Assembly District, represented by Democrat Mike Fong. Federally, North El Monte is located in California's 31st congressional district, which is represented by Democrat Gil Cisneros.

== Education ==
North El Monte is served by the El Monte City School District and by the El Monte Union High School District.
