= California's 31st congressional district =

U.S. House district for California

Coordinates: 34°06′36″N 117°21′12″W

- Interactive map of district boundaries
- Representative: Gil Cisneros; D–Covina
- Population (2025): 718,679
- Median household income: $100,519
- Ethnicity: 60.6% Hispanic; 19.6% Asian; 15.0% White; 2.3% Black; 1.8% Two or more races; 0.7% other
- Cook PVI: D+10

California's 31st congressional district is a congressional district in Los Angeles County, in the U.S. state of California. The district is located in the San Gabriel Valley and contains most of the Hispanic-majority areas in that region.

From January 3, 2023, following the 2020 redistricting cycle, the district is currently represented by Democrat Gil Cisneros.

== Recent election results from statewide races ==
=== 2023–2027 boundaries ===
Year	Office	Results
2008	President	Obama 63% - 36%
2010	Governor	Brown 57% - 37%
2010	Lt. Governor	Newsom 51% - 36%
2010	Secretary of State	Bowen 56% - 35%
2010	Attorney General	Harris 47% - 45%
2010	Treasurer	Lockyer 60% - 32%
2010	Controller	Chiang 56% - 34%
2012	President	Obama 66% - 34%
2014	Governor	Brown 59% - 41%
2016	President	Clinton 66% - 29%
2018	Governor	Newsom 64% - 36%
2018	Attorney General	Becerra 67% - 33%
2020	President	Biden 64% - 33%
2022	Senate (Reg.)	Padilla 61% - 39%
2022	Governor	Newsom 58% - 42%
2022	Lt. Governor	Kounalakis 59% - 41%
2022	Secretary of State	Weber 59% - 41%
2022	Attorney General	Bonta 58% - 42%
2022	Treasurer	Ma 58% - 42%
2022	Controller	Cohen 56% - 44%
2024	President	Harris 57% - 40%
2024	Senate (Reg.)	Schiff 57% - 43%

== Composition ==
FIPS County Code	County	Seat	Population
37	Los Angeles	Los Angeles	9,663,345

Under the 2020 redistricting, California's 31st congressional district is located in Southern California, taking up part of eastern Los Angeles County. It includes the cities of El Monte, West Covina, Baldwin Park, Azusa, San Dimas, La Verne, Duarte, South El Monte, Industry, La Puente, Bradbury, Irwindale, and Covina; the south sides of the cities of Glendora and Monrovia; and the census-designated places Avocado Heights, North El Monte, South San Jose Hills, West Puente Valley, Valinda, Mayflower Village, South Monrovia Island, Vincent, Citrus, and Charter Oak.

Los Angeles County is split between this district, the 28th district, the 34th district, and the 38th district. The 31st and the 28th are partitioned by Rio Hondo River, Garvey Ave, Highway 19, Highway 10, Eaton Wash, Temple City Blvd, Valley Blvd, Ellis Ln, Lower Azusa Rd, Grande Ave, Santa Anita Ave, Lynrose St, Flood Control Basin, Peck Rd, Randolph St, Cogswell Rd, Clark St, Durfree Ave, Santa Anita Wash, S 10th Ave, Jeffries Ave, Mayflower/Fairgreen Ave, Alta Vista/Fairgreen Ave, El Norte Ave, S 5th Ave, Valencia Way/N 5th Ave, Hillcrest Blvd, E Hillcrest Blvd, Grand Ave, E Greystone Ave, N Bradoaks Ave, Angeles National Forest, W Fork Rd, Highway 39, Cedar Creek, Iron Fork, Glendora Mountain Rd, Morris Reservoir, W Sierra Madre Ave, N Lorraine Ave, E Foothill Blvd, E Carroll Ave, Steffen St, S Lorraine Ave, AT and SF Railway, E Route 66, N Cataract Ave, San Dimas Canyon Rd, Clayton Ct, Live Oak Canyon, Rotary Dr, Highway 30, Williams Ave, Highway 210, Garey Ave, and Summer Ave.

The 31st, 35th, and 38th are partitioned by Whittier Narrows Recreation Area, N Lexington-Gallatin Rd, N Durfree Ave, E Thienes Ave, E Rush St, N Burkett Rd, Cunningham Dr, Eaglemont Dr, Oakman Dr, Arciero Dr, Grossmont Dr, Workman Mill Rd, Bunbury Dr, Fontenoy Ave, Ankerton, Whittier Woods Circle, Union Pacific Railroad, San Gabriel Freeway, N Peck Rd, Mission Mill Rd, Rose Hills Rd, Wildwood Dr, Clark Ave, San Jose Creek, Turnbull Canyon Rd, E Gale Ave, Pomona Freeway, Colima Rd, E Walnut Dr N, Nogales St, E Walnut Dr S, Fairway Dr, E Valley Blvd, Calle Baja, La Puente Rd, S Sentous Ave, N Nogales St, Amar Rd, Walnut City Parkland, San Bernardino Freeway, Fairplex Dr, Via Verde, Puddingstone Reservoir, McKinley Ave, N Whittle Ave, Arrow Highway, Fulton Rd, and Foothill Blvd.

=== Cities and CDPs with 10,000 or more people ===
- West Covina – 109,501
- El Monte – 109,450
- Baldwin Park – 72,176
- Glendora – 52,558
- Covina – 51,268
- Azusa – 50,000
- La Puente – 38,062
- Monrovia – 37,931
- San Dimas – 34,064
- La Verne – 31,334
- West Puente Valley – 22,959
- Valinda – 22,437
- Duarte – 21,727
- South San Jose Hills – 19,855
- South El Monte – 19,567
- Vincent – 15,714
- Avocado Heights – 13,317
- Citrus – 10,243

=== 2,500 to 10,000 people ===
- Charter Oak – 9,739
- South Monrovia Island – 6,515
- Mayflower Village – 5,402
- North El Monte – 3,730

== Future composition ==
- Los Angeles (part)
- San Bernardino (part)

== List of members representing the district ==
Member	Party	Dates	Cong ress(es)	Electoral history	Counties
District created January 3, 1963
Charles H. Wilson (Hawthorne)	Democratic	January 3, 1963 – January 3, 1981	88th 89th 90th 91st 92nd 93rd 94th 95th 96th	Elected in 1962. Re-elected in 1964. Re-elected in 1966. Re-elected in 1968. Re-elected in 1970. Re-elected in 1972. Re-elected in 1974. Re-elected in 1976. Re-elected in 1978. Lost re-nomination.	1963–1969; Los Angeles
Charles H. Wilson (Hawthorne)	Democratic	January 3, 1963 – January 3, 1981	88th 89th 90th 91st 92nd 93rd 94th 95th 96th	Elected in 1962. Re-elected in 1964. Re-elected in 1966. Re-elected in 1968. Re-elected in 1970. Re-elected in 1972. Re-elected in 1974. Re-elected in 1976. Re-elected in 1978. Lost re-nomination.	1969–1973; Los Angeles
Charles H. Wilson (Hawthorne)	Democratic	January 3, 1963 – January 3, 1981	88th 89th 90th 91st 92nd 93rd 94th 95th 96th	Elected in 1962. Re-elected in 1964. Re-elected in 1966. Re-elected in 1968. Re-elected in 1970. Re-elected in 1972. Re-elected in 1974. Re-elected in 1976. Re-elected in 1978. Lost re-nomination.	1973–1975; Los Angeles
Charles H. Wilson (Hawthorne)	Democratic	January 3, 1963 – January 3, 1981	88th 89th 90th 91st 92nd 93rd 94th 95th 96th	Elected in 1962. Re-elected in 1964. Re-elected in 1966. Re-elected in 1968. Re-elected in 1970. Re-elected in 1972. Re-elected in 1974. Re-elected in 1976. Re-elected in 1978. Lost re-nomination.	1975–1983; Los Angeles
Mervyn Dymally (Compton)	Democratic	January 3, 1981 – January 3, 1993	97th 98th 99th 100th 101st 102nd	Elected in 1980. Re-elected in 1982. Re-elected in 1984. Re-elected in 1986. Re-elected in 1988. Re-elected in 1990. Retired.	1975–1983; Los Angeles
Mervyn Dymally (Compton)	Democratic	January 3, 1981 – January 3, 1993	97th 98th 99th 100th 101st 102nd	Elected in 1980. Re-elected in 1982. Re-elected in 1984. Re-elected in 1986. Re-elected in 1988. Re-elected in 1990. Retired.	1983–1993; Los Angeles (Carson, Compton)
Matthew G. Martínez (Monterey Park)	Democratic	January 3, 1993 – July 27, 2000	103rd 104th 105th 106th	Redistricted from the 30th district and re-elected in 1992. Re-elected in 1994. Re-elected in 1996. Re-elected in 1998. Lost re-nomination.	1993–2003; Los Angeles (Baldwin Park, East L.A.)
Matthew G. Martínez (Monterey Park)	Republican	July 27, 2000 – January 3, 2001	106th	Switched to Republican Party after losing re-nomination.	1993–2003; Los Angeles (Baldwin Park, East L.A.)
Hilda Solis (El Monte)	Democratic	January 3, 2001 – January 3, 2003	107th	Elected in 2000. Redistricted to the 32nd district.	1993–2003; Los Angeles (Baldwin Park, East L.A.)
Xavier Becerra (Los Angeles)	Democratic	January 3, 2003 – January 3, 2013	108th 109th 110th 111th 112th	Redistricted from the 30th district and re-elected in 2002. Re-elected in 2004. Re-elected in 2006. Re-elected in 2008. Re-elected in 2010. Redistricted to the 34th district.	2003–2013 Los Angeles (Hollywood, Northeast L.A.)
Gary Miller (Rancho Cucamonga)	Republican	January 3, 2013 – January 3, 2015	113th	Redistricted from the 42nd district and re-elected in 2012. Retired.	2013–2023 Inland Empire including San Bernardino and Rancho Cucamonga
Pete Aguilar (Redlands)	Democratic	January 3, 2015 – January 3, 2023	114th 115th 116th 117th	Elected in 2014. Re-elected in 2016. Re-elected in 2018. Re-elected in 2020. Redistricted to the 33rd district.	2013–2023 Inland Empire including San Bernardino and Rancho Cucamonga
Grace Napolitano (Norwalk)	Democratic	January 3, 2023 – January 3, 2025	118th	Redistricted from the 32nd district and re-elected in 2022. Retired.	2023–present Arcadia, El Monte, Baldwin Park, Duarte, West Covina, Covina, Azusa, southern Glendora, and most of Ramona in eastern Los Angeles County
Gil Cisneros (Covina)	Democratic	January 3, 2025 – present	119th	Elected in 2024. Re-elected in 2026.	2023–present Arcadia, El Monte, Baldwin Park, Duarte, West Covina, Covina, Azusa, southern Glendora, and most of Ramona in eastern Los Angeles County

== Election results ==
=== 1962 ===
1962 United States House of Representatives elections in California
Party	Candidate	Votes	%
Democratic	Charles H. Wilson (Incumbent)	76,631	52.2
Republican	Gordon Hahn	70,154	47.8
Total votes		146,785	100.0
Democratic win (new seat)			

=== 1964 ===
1964 United States House of Representatives elections in California
Party	Candidate	Votes	%
Democratic	Charles H. Wilson (Incumbent)	114,246	64.0
Republican	Norman G. Shanahan	64,256	36.0
Total votes		178,502	100.0
Democratic hold			

=== 1966 ===
1966 United States House of Representatives elections in California
Party	Candidate	Votes	%
Democratic	Charles H. Wilson (Incumbent)	92,875	63.4
Republican	Norman G. Shanahan	53,708	36.6
Total votes		146,583	100.0
Democratic hold			

=== 1968 ===
1968 United States House of Representatives elections in California
Party	Candidate	Votes	%
Democratic	Charles H. Wilson (Incumbent)	94,387	58.9
Republican	James R. Dunn	62,711	39.1
American Independent	Stanley L. Schulte	3,134	2.0
Total votes		160,232	100.0
Democratic hold			

=== 1970 ===
1970 United States House of Representatives elections in California
Party	Candidate	Votes	%
Democratic	Charles H. Wilson (Incumbent)	102,071	73.2
Republican	Fred L. Casmir	37,416	26.8
Total votes		139,487	100.0
Democratic hold			

=== 1972 ===
1972 United States House of Representatives elections in California
Party	Candidate	Votes	%
Democratic	Charles H. Wilson (Incumbent)	85,954	52.3
Republican	Ben Valentine	69,876	42.5
Peace and Freedom	Roberta Lynn Wood	8,582	5.2
Total votes		164,412	100.0
Democratic hold			

=== 1974 ===
1974 United States House of Representatives elections in California
Party	Candidate	Votes	%
Democratic	Charles H. Wilson (Incumbent)	60,560	70.5
Republican	Norman A. Hodges	23,039	26.8
Peace and Freedom	William C. Taylor	2,349	2.7
Total votes		85,948	100.0
Democratic hold			

=== 1976 ===
1976 United States House of Representatives elections in California
Party	Candidate	Votes	%
Democratic	Charles H. Wilson (Incumbent)	83,155	100.0
Democratic hold			

=== 1978 ===
1978 United States House of Representatives elections in California
Party	Candidate	Votes	%
Democratic	Charles H. Wilson (Incumbent)	55,667	67.8
Republican	Don Grimshaw	26,490	32.2
Total votes		82,157	100.0
Democratic hold			

=== 1980 ===
1980 United States House of Representatives elections in California
Party	Candidate	Votes	%
Democratic	Mervyn M. Dymally	69,146	64.4
Republican	Don Grimshaw	38,203	35.6
Total votes		107,349	100.0
Democratic hold			

=== 1982 ===
1982 United States House of Representatives elections in California
Party	Candidate	Votes	%
Democratic	Mervyn M. Dymally (Incumbent)	86,718	72.4
Republican	Henry C. Minturn	33,043	27.6
Total votes		119,761	100.0
Democratic hold			

=== 1984 ===
1984 United States House of Representatives elections in California
Party	Candidate	Votes	%
Democratic	Mervyn M. Dymally (Incumbent)	100,658	70.7
Republican	Henry C. Minturn	41,691	29.3
Total votes		142,349	100.0
Democratic hold			

=== 1986 ===
1986 United States House of Representatives elections in California
Party	Candidate	Votes	%
Democratic	Mervyn M. Dymally (Incumbent)	77,126	70.3
Republican	Jack McMurray	30,322	27.6
Peace and Freedom	B. Kwaku Duren	2,333	2.1
Total votes		109,781	100.0
Democratic hold			

=== 1988 ===
1988 United States House of Representatives elections in California
Party	Candidate	Votes	%
Democratic	Mervyn M. Dymally (Incumbent)	100,919	71.6
Republican	Arnold C. May	36,017	25.5
Peace and Freedom	B. Kwaku Duren	4,091	2.9
Total votes		151,027	100.0
Democratic hold			

=== 1990 ===
1990 United States House of Representatives elections in California
Party	Candidate	Votes	%
Democratic	Mervyn M. Dymally (Incumbent)	56,394	67.1
Republican	Eunice N. Sato	27,593	32.9
Total votes		83,987	100.0
Democratic hold			

=== 1992 ===
1992 United States House of Representatives elections in California
Party	Candidate	Votes	%
Democratic	Matthew G. Martínez (Incumbent)	68,324	62.6
Republican	Reuben D. Franco	40,873	37.4
Total votes		109,197	100.0
Democratic hold			

=== 1994 ===
1994 United States House of Representatives elections in California
Party	Candidate	Votes	%
Democratic	Matthew G. Martínez (Incumbent)	50,541	59.1
Republican	John V. Flores	34,926	40.9
Total votes		85,467	100.0
Democratic hold			

=== 1996 ===
1996 United States House of Representatives elections in California
Party	Candidate	Votes	%
Democratic	Matthew G. Martínez (Incumbent)	69,285	67.5
Republican	John Flores	28,705	28.0
Libertarian	Michael Everling	4,700	4.5
Total votes		102,690	100.0
Democratic hold			

=== 1998 ===
1998 United States House of Representatives elections in California
Party	Candidate	Votes	%
Democratic	Matthew G. Martínez (Incumbent)	61,173	70.0
Republican	Frank C. Moreno	19,786	22.7
Green	Krista Lieberg-Wong	4,377	5.0
Libertarian	Michael B. Everling	1,121	1.3
Natural Law	Gary Hearne	903	1.03
Total votes		87,360	100.0
Democratic hold			

=== 2000 ===
2000 United States House of Representatives elections in California
Party	Candidate	Votes	%
Democratic	Hilda Solis	89,600	79.4
Green	Krista Lieberg-Wong	10,294	9.1
Libertarian	Michael McGuire	7,138	6.3
Natural Law	Richard D. Griffin	5,882	5.2
Total votes		112,914	100.0
Democratic gain from Republican			

=== 2002 ===
2002 United States House of Representatives elections in California
Party	Candidate	Votes	%
Democratic	Xavier Becerra (Incumbent)	54,569	81.2
Republican	Luis Vega	12,674	18.8
Total votes		67,243	100.0
Democratic hold			

=== 2004 ===
2004 United States House of Representatives elections in California
Party	Candidate	Votes	%
Democratic	Xavier Becerra (Incumbent)	89,363	80.3
Republican	Luis Vega	22,048	19.7
Total votes		111,411	100.0
Democratic hold			

=== 2006 ===
2006 United States House of Representatives elections in California
Party	Candidate	Votes	%
Democratic	Xavier Becerra (Incumbent)	64,952	100.0
Democratic hold			

=== 2008 ===
2008 United States House of Representatives elections in California
Party	Candidate	Votes	%
Democratic	Xavier Becerra (Incumbent)	110,955	100.0
Democratic hold			

=== 2010 ===
2010 United States House of Representatives elections in California
Party	Candidate	Votes	%
Democratic	Xavier Becerra (Incumbent)	76,363	83.8
Republican	Stephen C. Smith	14,740	16.2
Total votes		91,103	100.0
Democratic hold			

=== 2012 ===
2012 United States House of Representatives elections in California
Party	Candidate	Votes	%
Republican	Gary Miller (Incumbent)	88,964	55.2
Republican	Robert Dutton	72,255	44.8
Total votes		161,219	100.0
Republican hold			

=== 2014 ===
2014 United States House of Representatives elections in California
Party	Candidate	Votes	%
Democratic	Pete Aguilar	51,622	51.7
Republican	Paul Chabot	48,162	48.3
Total votes		99,784	100.0
Democratic gain from Republican			

=== 2016 ===
2016 United States House of Representatives elections in California
Party	Candidate	Votes	%
Democratic	Pete Aguilar (Incumbent)	121,070	56.1
Republican	Paul Chabot	94,866	43.9
Total votes		215,936	100.0
Democratic hold			

=== 2018 ===
2018 United States House of Representatives elections in California
Party	Candidate	Votes	%
Democratic	Pete Aguilar (Incumbent)	110,343	58.7
Republican	Sean Flynn	77,352	41.3
Total votes		187,695	100.0
Democratic hold			

=== 2020 ===
2020 United States House of Representatives elections in California
Party	Candidate	Votes	%
Democratic	Pete Aguilar (Incumbent)	175,315	61.3
Republican	Agnes Gibboney	110,735	38.7
Total votes		286,045	100
Democratic hold			

=== 2022 ===
2022 United States House of Representatives elections in California
Party	Candidate	Votes	%
Democratic	Grace Napolitano (Incumbent)	91,472	59.5
Republican	Daniel Bocic Martinez	62,153	40.5
Total votes		153,625	100.0
Democratic hold			

== Historical district boundaries ==
Formerly, from 2003 to 2013, the district was the only congressional district entirely based within the City of Los Angeles, and included Hollywood and some predominantly Hispanic/Latino sections of central and northeast Los Angeles.

== See also ==
- List of United States congressional districts
- California's congressional districts
