= Mission Valley League =

High school athletic league in California

The Mission Valley League was a high school athletic league that was part of the CIF Southern Section. Member schools were all in the west side of the San Gabriel Valley region of Los Angeles County It was created in 1972 with eight schools: El Monte, Arroyo, Rosemead, Mt. View, Schurr, San Gabriel, Keppel, and Monrovia. The 2025-2026 school year was its final year. Five of its final members were moved to the new Metro Alliance Conference (MAC-12).

== Final members ==
- Arroyo High School (El Monte, California) - 1972
- El Monte High School - 1972
- Gabrielino High School (San Gabriel, California) - 1996
- Marshall Fundamental Secondary School (Pasadena, California) - 2014
- Mountain View High School (El Monte, California) - 1972
- Rosemead High School - 1972
- South El Monte High School - 1992

== Former members ==
- Cerritos High School (1994 - 1998)
- Duarte High School (1972 - 1992)
- Mark Keppel High School (Alhambra, California) (1972 - 1992)
- Monrovia High School (1972 - 1982)
- San Gabriel High School (1972 - 1982)
- Schurr High School (Montebello, California) (1972 - 1982)
