= El Monte Union High School District =

School district in California

- 3537 Johnson Avenue El Monte, California, 91731

District information
- Type: Public
- Motto: Excellence
- Grades: 9 - 12
- Established: 1901
- Superintendent: Dr. Edward Zuniga
- School board: Florencio F. Briones, Qui Nguyen, Ricardo Padilla, Esthela Torres de Siegrist, Carlos Salcedo
- Chair of the board: Florencio F. Briones
- Accreditation: WASC
- Schools: Arroyo High School; El Monte High School; Mountain View High School; Rosemead High School; South El Monte High School; Fernando R. Ledesma High School; Community Day School; El Monte-Rosemead Adult School

Students and staff
- Students: about 10,000
- Staff: about 1,250
- Athletic conference: CIF Southern Section; Mission Valley League

Other information
- Website: http://www.emuhsd.org/

The El Monte Union High School District (EMUHSD) is a public high school district headquartered in El Monte, California. The district employs 623 certificated employees and 625 classified employees. The professional staff provides educational programs for over 10,000 students in grades 9 through 12. It serves the cities of El Monte, South El Monte, the unincorporated community of North El Monte, the northern portion of Rosemead, and the southeastern portion of Temple City. Population studies show that approximately 200,000 people reside within the district's attendance boundaries. It includes 5 comprehensive high schools, a continuation high school, and an adult school.

== Board of trustees ==
Starting with the November 2022 election, board members are elected by geographical district with the population numbers released after the 2020 US Census. Prior to the change, voters elected the board members at-large. District 3, 4 and 5 are elected starting with the November 2022 election, while District 1 and 2 are elected starting with the November 2024 election.

== Schools ==
=== Comprehensive High Schools ===
- El Monte High School (El Monte, California, Opened in 1901)
- Rosemead High School (Rosemead, California, Opened in 1949)
- Arroyo High School (El Monte, California, Opened in 1955)
- Mountain View High School (El Monte, California, Opened in 1971)
- South El Monte High School (South El Monte, California, Opened in 1992)

=== Other Schools ===
- Fernando R. Ledesma High School (Formerly known as Valle Lindo Continuation School)
- El Monte Union Community Day School
- El Monte-Rosemead Adult School

== Feeder districts ==
- El Monte City School District
- Mountain View School District
- Rosemead School District
- Valle Lindo Elementary School District
