= Rosemead High School =

School in Rosemead, California, United States

Location
- 9063 Mission Dr; Rosemead, California; United States; 34.0854°N 118.0715°W

Information
- Type: Public secondary
- Motto: Sincerity, Honor, Tolerance, Service
- Established: 1949
- School district: El Monte Union High School District
- Principal: Janine Salanitro
- Teaching staff: 85.86 (FTE)
- Grades: 9–12
- Enrollment: 1,844 (2018–19)
- Student to teacher ratio: 21.48
- Colors: Maroon, gray, and white
- Sports: Basketball, baseball, cheer, colorguard, cross-country, football, soccer, tennis, track and field, soccer, softball, swimming, volleyball, wrestling
- Mascot: Panthers
- Yearbook: Pantherama
- Website: rhs.emuhsd.org

Rosemead High School is a secondary school located at 9063 East Mission Drive in Rosemead, California. It is a secondary school in the El Monte Union High School District.

Rosemead High School requires 220 credits for graduation, including 40 credits in English and 20 in science, mathematics and physical education, respectively. The school offers Chinese and Spanish as foreign languages. The school also offers a number of Advanced Placement courses.

== Academics ==
Rosemead High School provides a wide range of support programs to meet the academic needs of its students. The following programs are made available: English Language Arts support classes, which include; English Intensive for ninth-grade students, ALD 2 & ALD 3 English, for tenth and 11th-grade students, all of which are two-hour blocks; AVID; a math intervention lab was introduced during the 2017–2018 school year. An after-school PREP program is also available for use by students, providing tutoring in all core subject areas. Instructional services are provided to all Limited English Proficient (LEP) students by the California Education Code and Title V of the California Administrative Code. Special Education students have their needs met through Individualized Educational Programs (IEPs).

=== AP Courses ===
For the 2019–2020 school year, Rosemead High School offers 20 Advanced Placement classes: AP United States Government and Politics, AP United States History, AP World History: Modern, AP English Language and Composition, AP English Literature and Composition, AP Seminar, AP Calculus AB, AP Calculus BC, AP Statistics, AP Biology, AP Chemistry, AP Environmental Science, AP Physics 1, AP Chinese Language and Culture, AP Spanish Language and Culture, AP Spanish Literature and Culture, AP 2D Art and Design, AP Macroeconomics, and AP Psychology.

=== Career Technical Education programs ===
Some Rosemead High School students participate in certain Career and Technical Education courses including: • Arts Media and Entertainment with a career pathway to Graphic Arts • Hospitality, Tourism, and Recreation with a career pathway to Food Services and Hospitality • Finance and Banking with a career pathway to Financial Services Business Accounting • Engineering and Design with a career pathway to Engineering Design (Project Lead the Way)

== Extracurriculars ==
Rosemead High School offers a wide variety of clubs and sports run by students and administered by the principal of student affairs and corresponding advisors/coaches.

=== Sports ===
The following sports are currently active at Rosemead High School: boys and girls basketball, baseball, cheer, color guard, boys and girls cross-country, football, boys and girls soccer, tennis, track and field, soccer, softball, swimming, volleyball, and wrestling..

== School facilities ==
Built to house approximately 1,800 students, it has been in continuous operation ever since. Seventy-nine classrooms provide space for the school's comprehensive college preparatory and vocational curriculum, including ten science labs, two industrial technology classrooms, one family/consumer science state of the art culinary facility, two art classrooms, four performing arts (instrumental and vocal music, piano and drama) classrooms, three business computer labs, two Internet-connected computer labs, a full-sized gymnasium, dance room, and weight room, a library and an up-to-date cafeteria.

With the passage of Measure Y in 2003 and Measure D in 2008, the school and district began an extensive construction program to upgrade facilities. Rosemead has received new bleachers for its football stadium, upgrades, and renovation of all student and adult restrooms on campus, improved paving, grading, and drainage throughout the campus—including the renovation of Panther Square, and a complete rewiring of the bell, fire, and public address systems. Additional upgrades were a new two-story classroom building, and the doubling in size of the current library/media center was also added.

During the 2009-2010 school years, Rosemead High School underwent a bond-funded renovation and modernization. With the help of the bond a new two-story building composed of eighteen new classrooms, new parking lot, new track, new air-conditioning system in the auditorium, and the construction of a new weight room have all been completed. All landscaping and hardscape on campus are also new. The library, culinary arts kitchen, graphic arts classroom, all science labs, and administration building were all modernized.

== Achievements ==
- 2015 California Gold Ribbon School
- 2016 Best High School by US Newsweek
- 2017-18 State Honor Roll for High Performance

== Notable alumni ==
- Molly Bee, singer and actress
- Vikki Carr, singer
- Audie Desbrow, drummer for the band Great White
- Jaime Luis Gomez (1993), also known as Taboo, one of the members of The Black Eyed Peas
- Rene Gonzales, major league baseball player, Baltimore Orioles
- Maria Jimenez Henley, dancer and stage manager, appeared in the 1961 musical film West Side Story
- Humberto Leon, American fashion designer, founder of Opening Ceremony and creative director of the French fashion brand Kenzo
- Bob Mackie, fashion designer
- Rod Marinelli, former NFL head coach
- Prima J, Mexican American musical group
