= El Monte Transit =

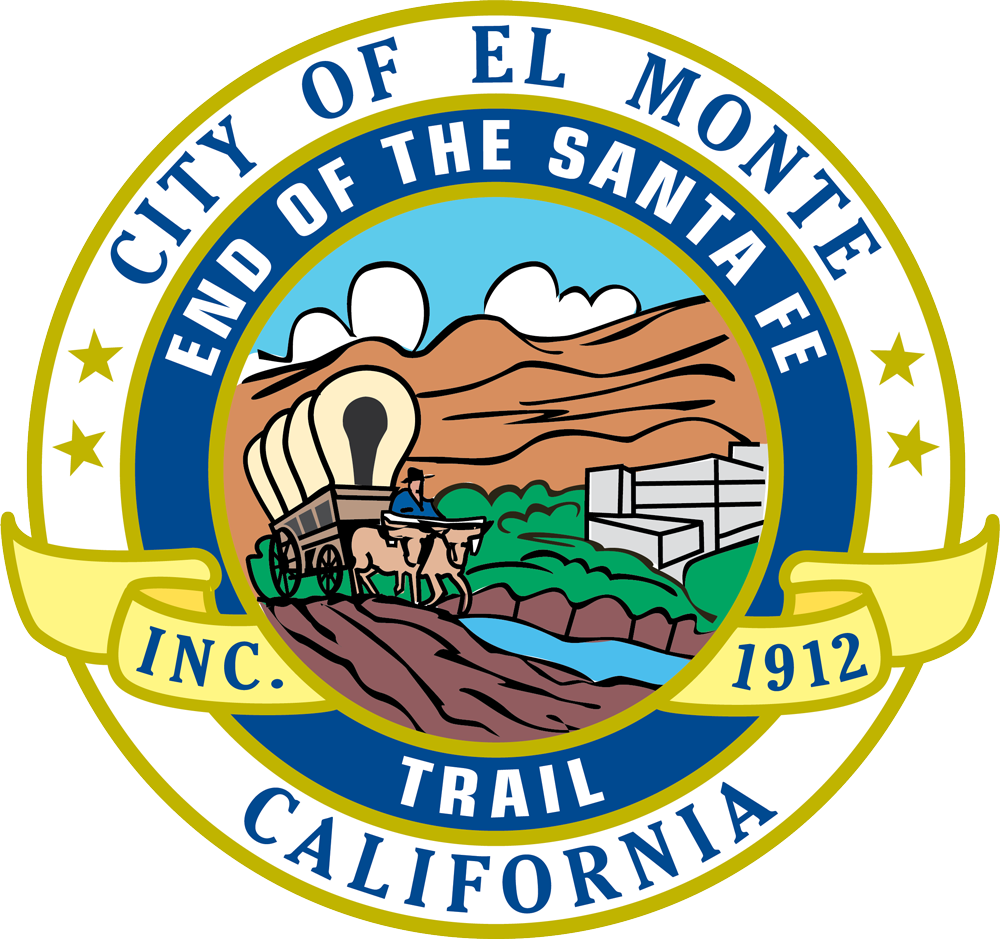
- Headquarters: 3629 Cypress Avenue
- Locale: El Monte, California
- Service type: bus service, paratransit
- Routes: 7
- Fleet: 18 buses
- Fuel type: CNG, gasoline
- Operator: Southland Transit
- Website: El Monte Transit

El Monte Transit provides mass transportation in the Los Angeles suburb of El Monte, California. Five local routes complement Los Angeles Metro's crosstown routes through the city.

== Route overview ==
El Monte Transit operates 5 fixed routes operating in loops with terminal at El Monte Trolley Station on Center Avenue. In addition, two shuttle services also connect commuters with the El Monte Metrolink station.

=== Fixed-Route ===
Route	Terminals	Service Area	Weekday Service Hours	Weekend Service Hours	Frequency
Blue Route	El Monte El Monte Trolley Station	Cogswell	6:40 a.m. - 6:40 p.m.	9:20 a.m. - 5:20 p.m.	40 minutes
Green Route	El Monte El Monte Trolley Station	Valley Mall	6:40 a.m. - 6:40 p.m.	9:20 a.m. - 5:20 p.m.	40 minutes
Orange Route	El Monte El Monte Trolley Station	Klingerman	6:40 a.m. - 6:40 p.m.	9:20 a.m. - 5:20 p.m.	40 minutes
Red Route	El Monte El Monte Trolley Station	Hemlock	6:40 a.m. - 6:40 p.m.	9:20 a.m. - 5:20 p.m.	40 minutes
Yellow Route	El Monte El Monte Trolley Station	Maxson	6:40 a.m. - 6:40 p.m.	9:20 a.m. - 5:20 p.m.	40 minutes

- Trolley buses does not operate on New Year's Day, Presidents’ Day, Easter, Memorial Day, Independence Day, Labor Day, Thanksgiving Day and Christmas Day; Service will end at 5:15 p.m. on Christmas Eve and New Year's Eve.
- Cash fare to ride trolley bus is $0.50. Passengers can also pay by Trolley Tokens, which are sold in Value Packs to provide savings to riders.

=== Commuter Shuttle ===
Route	Terminals	Service Area	Weekday Service Hours
Flair Park	El Monte; El Monte Metrolink Station	Flair Business Park	6:11 a.m. - 6:21 p.m.
Civic Center	El Monte; El Monte Metrolink Station	El Monte Civic Center	6:11 a.m. - 8:12 a.m.

- Commuter Shuttles does not operate on Weekends, New Year's Day, Presidents’ Day, Memorial Day, Independence Day, Labor Day, Thanksgiving Day and Christmas Day.
- Cash fare to ride Commuter Shuttle is $0.50, or free to passengers with the valid Metrolink ticket or pass.

== Bus fleet ==
=== Fixed-Route ===
Make/Model	Fleet numbers	Thumbnail	Year	Engine	Transmission	Notes
ENC EZ Rider II BRT 32’ CNG	53		2015	Cummins Westport ISL G	Allison B300R	
ENC EZ Rider II BRT 32’ CNG	54-56		2016	Cummins Westport ISL G	Allison B300R	
ENC EZ Rider II BRT 32’ CNG	57-59		2017	Cummins Westport ISL G NZ	Allison B300R	

=== Commuter Shuttle ===
Make/Model	Fleet numbers	Thumbnail	Year	Engine	Transmission	Notes
Ford F550	1-2		2013			
ENC Aero Elite	1-2		2013			
Chevrolet C5	8-9		2008			
Glaval Titan	8-9		2008			
Ford F550	14-15, 17		2013			
ENC Aero Elite	14-15, 17		2013			
Ford E-Series E450	35, 77, 79		2017			
Starcraft Bus Allstar	35, 77, 79		2017			
ENC EZ Rider II BRT 32’ CNG	95		2015	Cummins Westport ISL G	Allison B300R	

=== Retired ===
Make/Model	Fleet numbers	Thumbnail	Year	Engine	Transmission	Notes
Blue Bird CSRE 32	44B					
DCCBNA SLF-232 CNG	40-50		2004	Cummins Westport B Gas Plus	Allison B300R	
Blue Bird Ultra LF 35' CNG	51		2006	Cummins Westport B Gas Plus	Allison B300R	
DCCBNA SLF-232 CNG	52		2003	Cummins Westport B Gas Plus	Allison B300R	
