= El Monte station (Metrolink) =

Commuter rail station in El Monte, California

El Monte
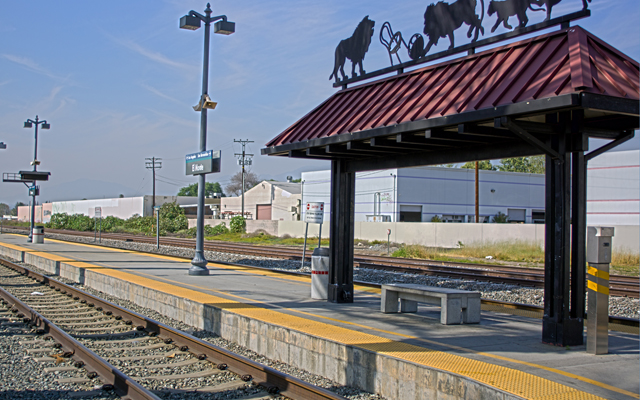
- El Monte station platform

General information
- Location: 10925 Railroad Street; El Monte, California; United States
- Coordinates: 34.0768°N 118.0356°W
- Owner: City of El Monte
- Line: SCRRA San Gabriel Subdivision
- Platforms: 1 island platform
- Tracks: 4
- Connections: See Connections section

Construction
- Parking: 238 spaces, 11 accessible spaces
- Cycle facilities: Racks, lockers
- Accessible: Yes

History
- Opened: October 26, 1992

Passengers
- FY 2026: 203 (avg. wkdy boardings)

Services
Preceding station	Metrolink	Following station
Cal State L.A. toward L.A. Union Station	San Bernardino Line	Baldwin Park toward San Bernardino or Redlands
Location

El Monte station is a train station on Metrolink's San Bernardino Line in El Monte, California. It is at 10925 Railroad Street between Santa Anita and Tyler Avenues north of Valley Boulevard. It has 238 parking spaces. The station is owned by the City of El Monte.

== Hours and frequency ==
El Monte station is served by 32 Metrolink San Bernardino Line trains (16 in each direction) on weekdays, between 5:04 a.m. and 10:08 p.m. Weekend train service is less: 16 trains (8 in each direction) on Saturdays and Sundays between 7:55 a.m. and 9:59 p.m.

Los Angeles Metro has plans to relocate the station to be closer to the bus station. Currently, the stations are approximately three-fourths of a mile apart from each other.

== Connections ==
The station is located directly across Railroad Street from the El Monte Trolley Station, the hub for the city's El Monte Transit system. Each of the agencies five color-coded routes (Blue, Green, Orange, Red, Yellow) stop at the Trolley Station every day of the week. In addition, the city also operates two commuter shuttles to the Civic Center and Flair Park on weekdays.

In addition, other regional bus operators stop near the station. Foothill Transit route 492 and Los Angeles Metro Bus route 287 stop on Santa Anita Ave to the west of the station, while Los Angeles Metro Bus route 268 stops on Tyler Avenue to the east of the station.
