= Mountain View School District (Los Angeles County, California) =

School district in California, United States

Address
- 3320 Gilman Road El Monte, California, 91732; United States

District information
- Type: Public
- Grades: K–8
- NCES District ID: 0626190

Students and staff
- Students: 5,788 (2020–2021)
- Teachers: 256.97 (FTE)
- Staff: 386.87 (FTE)
- Student–teacher ratio: 22.52:1

Other information
- Website: www.mtviewschools.com

Mountain View School District is a public school district based in Los Angeles County, California, United States that operates ten elementary schools, two middle schools, and two learning centers. The district serves the eastern portion of El Monte. It serves as a feeder district to El Monte Union High School District.

== History ==
In 2021, the school district voted to close Cogswell Elementary, Kranz Intermediate, Madrid Middle and Voorhis Elementary schools due to declining enrollment. Several elementary schools were also reconfigured to K-8 schools to replace the middle schools that closed.

== Schools ==
=== Elementary schools ===
- Baker Elementary School
- La Primaria Elementary School
- Maxson Elementary School
- Miramonte Elementary School
- Payne Elementary School

=== K-8 schools ===
- Monte Vista K-8 School
- Parkview K-8 School
- Twin Lakes Academy
