= AP Spanish Literature and Culture =

Advanced Placement course

Advanced Placement (AP) Spanish Literature and Culture (also known as AP Spanish Literature, AP Spanish Lit, AP SpLit, or AP Spanish V) is a high school course and examination offered by the College Board's Advanced Placement Program.

== The course ==
This course is based on improving skills in written Spanish and critical reading of advanced Spanish and Latin American literature. It is typically taught as a Spanish V or VI course. The AP Spanish Literature course is designed to be comparable to a third-year college/university introductory Hispanic literature course. Students concentrate on developing proficiency in reading and writing in preparation for the AP Spanish Literature examination. In addition, this course emphasizes mastery of linguistic competencies at a very high level of proficiency.

The course has a required reading list that draws from a variety of sources, including such well-known authors and poets as Federico García Lorca, Miguel de Cervantes, Tirso de Molina, Gabriel García Márquez, Alfonsina Storni, Juan Rulfo, Isabel Allende and Miguel de Unamuno, as well as a miscellany of lesser-known short stories, poems, and novels. A complete list of the readings is regulated annually by the College Board. The course is meant to be taught entirely in Spanish, though English translations of the stories are often common resources for students, but these are not completely widespread.

Each AP Theme has several contexts. The theme of Societies in Contact has five contexts: Assimilation and Marginalization, Diversity, Socioeconomic Divisions, Imperialism, and Nationalism and Regionalism. Time and Space has six contexts: Carpe Diem and Memento Mori, The Individual in Their Environment (El individuo en su entorno), Nature and the Environment, The Relationship Between Time and Space, Linear Time and Circular Time, and Trajectory and Transformation. The Duality of Being has four contexts: Construction of Reality, Spirituality and Religion, Public and Private Image, and Introspection. The Construction of Gender has five contexts: Male Chauvinism (Machismo), Social Relations, Patriarchal System, Sexualization, and Tradition and Rupture. Interpersonal Relationships has six contexts: Friendship and Hostility, Love and Contempt, Communication or Lack of Communication, The Individual and the Community, Power Relations, and Family Relations. Finally, Literary Creation has four contexts: Intertextuality, Self-conscious Literature, The Creative Process, and Text and Its Contexts.

== The exam ==
The exam is divided into two sections with several parts. Section I, consisting of 65 multiple-choice questions, is split into two parts. Part A (15 questions) is the listening component, which includes a twice-recited poem, a recording of an interview with an author, and a presentation concerning a topic that relates to the course. Part B (50 questions) is reading comprehension based on a wide variety of works, including literary criticism and selections from works that are not on the required reading list. Eighty minutes are given for the entire section.

Section II is free-response, containing two short-answer questions and two longer essays. The first question is based on an excerpt from a work on the required reading list, and students must name the author, identify the time period, and, most importantly, elaborate on the theme presented in the passage (15 minutes). The second question asks students to read an excerpt from a work on the required reading list and compare the theme presented to that of an accompanying piece of artwork (15 minutes). The third question tests students' ability to link a piece of literature on the required reading list to the greater genre or movement to which it belongs (35 minutes). Finally, the fourth question directs students to analyze the literary techniques in two excerpts, one of which is from a work on the required reading list, that are used to convey a shared theme (35 minutes). One hundred minutes are allotted for this section.

In all, the test is 180 minutes (3 hours) in duration.

== Grade distribution ==
The grade distributions since 2010 were:

Score	2010	2011	2012	2013	2014	2015	2016	2017	2018	2019	2020	2021	2022	2023	2024	2025	2026
5	11.5%	11.6%	11.5%	10.8%	9.9%	10.0%	8.8%	9.6%	9.7%	9.5%	17.6%	7.8%	8.1%	8.5%	9%	8%	20%
4	20.5%	20.7%	21.5%	28.2%	25.5%	24.9%	24.3%	26.1%	24.5%	25.0%	18.6%	20.8%	22.8%	23.3%	23%	23%	23%
3	28.6%	28.9%	28.9%	37.6%	39.1%	38.1%	36.9%	37.6%	36.1%	37.7%	38.8%	36.3%	33.4%	35.6%	34%	29%	28%
2	16.6%	15.9%	16.5%	18.2%	19.5%	20.6%	22.5%	20.4%	21.7%	21.4%	20.7%	25.5%	23.8%	22.5%	22%	21%	20%
1	22.7%	22.8%	21.6%	5.2%	6.0%	6.4%	7.6%	6.4%	8.0%	6.3%	4.3%	9.6%	11.9%	10.1%	12%	9%	9%
% of Scores 3 or Higher	60.7%	61.3%	61.8%	76.6%	74.5%	73.0%	70.0%	73.2%	70.3%	72.3%	75.1%	64.9%	64.2%	67.4%	66%	60%	71%
Mean	2.82	2.82	2.85	3.21	3.14	3.12	3.04	3.12	3.06	3.10	3.25	2.92	2.91	2.98	2.95		
Standard Deviation	1.31	1.31	1.30	1.03	1.03	1.05	1.06	1.04	1.08	1.04	1.10	1.07	1.12	1.10	1.13		
Number of Students	17,136	18,103	17,919	18,785	20,118	21,755	24,061	25,834	27,451	29,345	24,137	21,796	23,009	22,860	26,442	27,266	29,000

== See also ==
- AP Spanish Language
