= South Monrovia Island, California =

- Census-designated place
- Location in Los Angeles County, California

- Position in California
- Coordinates: 34°07′05″N 117°59′45″W
- Country: United States
- State: California
- County: Los Angeles

Area
  - Total: 0.548 sq mi (1.420 km^{2})
  - Land: 0.548 sq mi (1.420 km^{2})
  - Water: 0 sq mi (0 km^{2}) 0%
- Elevation: 384 ft (117 m)

Population (2020)
  - Total: 6,515
  - Density: 11,880/sq mi (4,588/km^{2})
- Time zone: UTC-8 (Pacific (PST))
  - Summer (DST): UTC-7 (PDT)
- GNIS feature ID: 2629294

South Monrovia Island is a census-designated place in Los Angeles County, California, United States. It sits at an elevation of 384 feet (117 m). It is bounded to the west and north by Monrovia, to the east by Duarte, and to the south by Irwindale. The 2020 United States census reported that South Monrovia Island's population was 6,515.

== Geography ==
According to the United States Census Bureau, the CDP has a total area of 0.5 square mile (1.4 km^{2}), all land.

== Demographics ==
Historical population
| Census | Pop. | Note | %± |
|---|---|---|---|
| 2010 | 6,777 | | — |
| 2020 | 6,515 | | −3.9% |
U.S. Decennial Census; 2000 2010; 2020

South Monrovia Island first appeared as a census designated place in the 2010 U.S. census formed from area detached from Monrovia city and additional area.

=== Racial and ethnic composition ===
South Monrovia Island CDP, California – Racial and ethnic composition Note: the US Census treats Hispanic/Latino as an ethnic category. This table excludes Latinos from the racial categories and assigns them to a separate category. Hispanics/Latinos may be of any race.
| Race / Ethnicity (NH = Non-Hispanic) | Pop 2010 | Pop 2020 | % 2010 | % 2020 |
|---|---|---|---|---|
| White alone (NH) | 741 | 666 | 10.93% | 10.22% |
| Black or African American alone (NH) | 531 | 390 | 7.84% | 5.99% |
| Native American or Alaska Native alone (NH) | 8 | 3 | 0.12% | 0.05% |
| Asian alone (NH) | 394 | 733 | 5.81% | 11.25% |
| Native Hawaiian or Pacific Islander alone (NH) | 0 | 3 | 0.00% | 0.05% |
| Other race alone (NH) | 11 | 35 | 0.16% | 0.54% |
| Mixed race or Multiracial (NH) | 79 | 95 | 1.17% | 1.46% |
| Hispanic or Latino (any race) | 5,013 | 4,590 | 73.97% | 70.45% |
| Total | 6,777 | 6,515 | 100.00% | 100.00% |

=== 2020 census ===
As of the 2020 census, South Monrovia Island had a population of 6,515. The median age was 37.4 years. 22.2% of residents were under the age of 18 and 13.1% of residents were 65 years of age or older. For every 100 females there were 98.9 males, and for every 100 females age 18 and over there were 94.7 males age 18 and over.

100.0% of residents lived in urban areas, while 0.0% lived in rural areas.

There were 1,635 households in South Monrovia Island, of which 42.6% had children under the age of 18 living in them. Of all households, 53.3% were married-couple households, 15.5% were households with a male householder and no spouse or partner present, and 26.1% were households with a female householder and no spouse or partner present. About 11.2% of all households were made up of individuals and 4.8% had someone living alone who was 65 years of age or older.

There were 1,674 housing units, of which 2.3% were vacant. The homeowner vacancy rate was 0.4% and the rental vacancy rate was 4.1%.

=== 2010 census ===
At the 2010 census South Monrovia Island had a population of 6,777. The population density was 12,372.2 inhabitants per square mile (4,776.9/km^{2}). The racial makeup of South Monrovia Island was 3,433 (50.7%) White (10.9% Non-Hispanic White), 570 (8.4%) African American, 49 (0.7%) Native American, 418 (6.2%) Asian, 9 (0.1%) Pacific Islander, 2,003 (29.6%) from other races, and 295 (4.4%) from two or more races. Hispanic or Latino of any race were 5,013 persons (74.0%).

The census reported that 6,620 people (97.7% of the population) lived in households, 9 (0.1%) lived in non-institutionalized group quarters, and 148 (2.2%) were institutionalized.

There were 1,551 households, 857 (55.3%) had children under the age of 18 living in them, 907 (58.5%) were opposite-sex married couples living together, 271 (17.5%) had a female householder with no husband present, 142 (9.2%) had a male householder with no wife present. There were 92 (5.9%) unmarried opposite-sex partnerships, and 7 (0.5%) same-sex married couples or partnerships. 179 households (11.5%) were one person and 84 (5.4%) had someone living alone who was 65 or older. The average household size was 4.27. There were 1,320 families (85.1% of households); the average family size was 4.39.

The age distribution was 1,937 people (28.6%) under the age of 18, 772 people (11.4%) aged 18 to 24, 1,945 people (28.7%) aged 25 to 44, 1,574 people (23.2%) aged 45 to 64, and 549 people (8.1%) who were 65 or older. The median age was 32.0 years. For every 100 females, there were 99.2 males. For every 100 females age 18 and over, there were 99.5 males.

There were 1,613 housing units at an average density of 2,944.7 per square mile, of the occupied units 1,151 (74.2%) were owner-occupied and 400 (25.8%) were rented. The homeowner vacancy rate was 2.1%; the rental vacancy rate was 2.2%. 4,835 people (71.3% of the population) lived in owner-occupied housing units and 1,785 people (26.3%) lived in rental housing units.

According to the 2010 United States Census, South Monrovia Island had a median household income of $52,936, with 16.1% of the population living below the federal poverty line.

== Education ==
The western part is in the Monrovia Unified School District and the eastern part is in the Duarte Unified School District.
