= AP Environmental Science =

Advanced Placement course and exam

Logo of AP Environmental Science as of 2025

Advanced Placement (AP) Environmental Science (also known as APES, AP Enviro, AP Environmental, AP Environment, or AP EnviroSci) is a course and exam offered by the American College Board as part of the Advanced Placement Program to high school students interested in the environmental and natural sciences. AP Environmental Science was first offered in the 1997–1998 school year. The course is designed to replicate one-semester, introductory environmental science classes at typical American universities and colleges.

== Course ==
This course is designed to provide students with scientific principles, concepts, and methodologies necessary to comprehend the relationships abundant within the natural world, to identify and analyze environmental problems, to evaluate relative risks associated with these identified problems, and to examine alternative solutions for resolving and/or preventing similar problems facing the global environment. Lessons are taught in classroom settings as well as in the field through outdoor classrooms, field trips, and volunteer activities.

Topics covered in AP Environmental Science, according to the College Board, as of Fall 2019 include:

Unit	Topic	Topics May Include	Exam Weighting
1	The Living World: Ecosystems	Introduction to ecosystems; Terrestrial and aquatic biomes; Primary productivity; Carbon, nitrogen, phosphorus, and water cycles; Trophic levels; The flow of energy in an ecosystem and the 10% rule; Food chains and food webs	6–8%
2	The Living World: Biodiversity	Introduction to biodiversity; Ecosystem services; Island biogeography; Ecological tolerance; Natural disruptions to ecosystems; Ecological succession	6–8%
3	Populations	Generalist and specialist species; Survivorship curves; Population growth and resource availability; Age structure diagrams; Human population dynamics	10–15%
4	Earth Systems and Resources	Tectonic plates; Soil formation and erosion; Earth's atmosphere; Global wind patterns; Earth's geography and climate; El Niño and La Niña	10–15%
5	Land and Water Use	The tragedy of the commons; The Green Revolution; Types and effects of irrigation; Pest-control methods; Meat production methods and overfishing; The impacts of mining; Urbanization and ecological footprints; Introduction to sustainable practices including crop rotation and aquaculture	10–15%
6	Energy Resources and Consumption	Energy sources and fuel types, including fossil fuels, ethanol, and nuclear power; Global energy consumption and distribution of natural resources; Natural sources of energy, including solar power, wind, geothermal, and hydroelectric power; Energy conservation methods	10–15%
7	Atmospheric Pollution	Introduction to air pollution; Photochemical smog; Indoor air pollution; Methods to reduce air pollutants; Acid rain; Noise pollution	7–10%
8	Aquatic and Terrestrial Pollution	Sources of pollution; Human impact on ecosystems; Thermal pollution; Solid waste disposal and waste reduction methods; Pollution and human health; Pathogens and infectious diseases	7–10%
9	Global Change	Ozone depletion; Global climate change; Ocean warming and acidification; Invasive species; Human impacts on diversity	15–20%

Topics covered in AP Environmental Science prior to Fall 2019 include:

Topic	Percent
Earth Systems and Resources	10–15%
The Living World	10–15%
Population	10–15%
Land and Water use	10–15%
Energy Resources and Consumption	10–15%
Pollution	25–30%
Global Change	10–15%

These topics cover a broad range of subject matter in order to prepare students for environmental science roles and interdisciplinary disciplines.

=== Skills practiced in AP Environmental Science, according to the College Board ===
Skill	Description	Exam Weighting (Multiple Choice Section)	Exam Weighting (Free-Response Section)
1. Concept Explanation	Explain environmental concepts, processes, and models presented in written format	30%–38%	13%–20%
2. Visual Representations	Analyze visual representations of environmental concepts and processes	12%–19%	6%–10%
3. Text Analysis	Analyze sources of information about environmental issues	6%–8%	Not assessed in free-response section.
4. Scientific Experiments	Analyze research studies that test environmental principles	2%–4%	10%–14%
5. Data Analysis	Analyze and interpret quantitative data represented in tables, charts, and graphs	12%–19%	6%–10%
6. Mathematical Routines	Apply quantitative methods to address environmental concepts	6%–9%	20%
7. Environmental Solutions	Propose and justify solutions to environmental problems	17%–23%	26%–34%

== Exam ==
The AP Environmental Science exam is divided into a multiple choice and free response section.

=== Old exam (1998–2019) ===
The old exam was 3 hours long and contained two sections:

- Section I: Multiple Choice (100 questions, 90 minutes).
- Section II: Free-Response (one data-set question, one document-based question, and two synthesis and evaluation questions, 90 minutes).

=== Current exam (2020–present) ===
As of fall 2019, multiple changes have been made to the AP Environmental Science exam. These changes include but are not limited to: allowed calculator use, changes in the number of multiple choice questions, the use of stimuli in multiple choice questions, and changes in free response questions.
According to the College Board: "The exam is 2 hours and 40 minutes long and includes 80 multiple-choice questions and 3 free-response questions. A four-function, scientific, or graphing calculator is allowed on both sections of the exam." The exam is fully online using the Bluebook testing app. All responses are submitted upon exam completion. The new exam contains two sections with slight changes:

- Section I: Multiple Choice (80 questions, 90 minutes).
- Section II: Free-Response (one investigation design question, one solution to an environmental problem proposal question, and one solution to an environmental problem proposal question with calculations, 70 minutes).

=== Grade distribution ===
The percentage of students scoring a grade of "5" was only 7.0% in the 2021 testing administration. It remains one of the lowest "5" scoring AP Exams to this date right under AP Art History, AP English Literature & Composition, AP English Language & Composition, and AP World History. The AP Environmental Science exam was first administered in 1998.

Grade distributions since 2009 are:

Score	2009	2010	2011	2012	2013	2014	2015	2016	2017	2018	2019	2020	2021	2022	2023	2024	2025	2026
5	10.4%	10.4%	8.9%	8.9%	8.0%	8.3%	7.7%	7.6%	9.5%	8.8%	9.4%	11.9%	7.0%	8.9%	8.3%	9%	12%	13%
4	20.7%	22.6%	24.8%	24.9%	23.4%	23.6%	24.2%	23.2%	24.5%	23.9%	25.7%	28.5%	24.9%	27.4%	28.4%	27%	28%	29%
3	18.9%	17.0%	15.6%	16.6%	16.8%	15.3%	15.1%	14.8%	15.4%	15.0%	14.1%	13.0%	18.5%	17.5%	17.0%	18%	29%	27%
2	18.5%	18.1%	24.9%	24.3%	25.4%	25.5%	25.4%	25.8%	24.5%	25.8%	25.4%	25.5%	27.6%	25.9%	26.4%	26%	15%	15%
1	31.5%	32.0%	25.8%	25.3%	26.5%	27.2%	27.6%	28.6%	26.2%	26.5%	25.4%	21.0%	22.1%	20.3%	19.9%	20%	16%	16%
% of scores 3 or higher	50.0%	50.0%	49.4%	50.4%	48.2%	47.3%	47.0%	45.6%	49.4%	47.7%	49.2%	53.4%	50.3%	53.8%	53.7%	54%	69%	69%
Mean	2.60	2.61	2.66	2.68	2.61	2.60	2.59	2.55	2.67	2.63	2.68	2.85	2.67	2.79	2.79	2.79		
Standard deviation	1.38	1.40	1.33	1.33	1.31	1.32	1.32	1.32	1.34	1.33	1.34	1.35	1.26	1.29	1.28	1.28		
Number of students	73,575	86,650	98,959	108,839	118,288	130,321	138,703	149,096	159,578	166,433	172,456	162,469	160,771	179,957	209,757	236,371	245,371	245,000
