= Mountain View School District (San Bernardino County, California) =

School district in California, United States

Address
- 2585 South Archibald Avenue Ontario, California, 91761; United States

District information
- Type: Public
- Grades: K–8
- NCES District ID: 0626220

Students and staff
- Students: 2,625 (2020–2021)
- Teachers: 111.37 (FTE)
- Staff: 114.85 (FTE)
- Student–teacher ratio: 23.57:1

Other information
- Website: www.mtnview.k12.ca.us

Mountain View School District is located in Ontario, California. The district serves the eastern portion of Ontario. It is a feeder district for Chaffey Joint Union High School District. The School Board of composed of five members, elected at-large. The elections take place on a Tuesday after the first Monday in November of even-numbered years.

== Schools ==
The district operates five schools:

- Creek View Elementary School 3742 Lytle Creek North Loop, Ontario, California
- Mountain View Elementary School 2825 Walnut Street, Ontario, California
- New Haven Elementary School, 3998 South Turner Ave, Ontario, California
- Ranch View Elementary School 3300 Old Archibald Ranch Road, Ontario, California
- Grace Yokley Jr High School 2947 South Turner Avenue, Ontario, California
- Park View Elementary School 4860 S Celebration Avenue, Ontario, California
