= AP Spanish Language and Culture =

Advanced Placement course

Advanced Placement (AP) Spanish Language and Culture (also known as AP Spanish Language, AP Spanish IV, AP SpLang, or AP Spanish) is a course and examination offered by the College Board in the United States education system as part of the Advanced Placement Program.

== The course ==
This course is primarily a comprehensive review of all previous knowledge pertaining to the Spanish language. This class builds upon the skills developed within introductory and intermediate Spanish classes by applying each skill to a specific, contemporary context; common themes include health, education, careers, literature, history, family, relationships, and the environment. Students also improve their skills in writing, reading, speaking, and understanding spoken Spanish. Students concentrate on developing proficiency in such skills, specifically in preparation for the AP Spanish Language examination.

Despite efforts by the College Board, the AP Spanish Language curriculum is very fluid. Individual teachers can choose to present the material in a variety of ways, with varying results. Since the exam tests general Spanish proficiency rather than a certain aspect thereof, a unified curriculum covering specific vocabulary, verb forms, expressions, and other facets of the language is hard to develop.

While some students may be concerned about their ability to demonstrate proficiency in an assessment that is also taken by native Spanish speakers, only the scores of students who study Spanish as a second language are factored in when creating the distribution curve of scores 1–5. Native speakers or heritage language speakers of Spanish are then compared to non-native distribution and assigned a score accordingly.

There are six AP themes in the course, and within each theme there are six contexts.

Themes	Contexts
Families and Communities	Customs and Values, Education Communities, Family Structure, Global Citizenship, Human Geography, Social Networking
Personal and Public Identities	Alienation and Assimilation, Heroes and Historical Figures, National and Ethnic Identities, Personal Beliefs, Personal Interests, Self-Image
Beauty and Aesthetics	Architecture, Defining Beauty, Defining Creativity, Fashion and Design, Language and Literature, Visual and Performing Arts
Science and Technology	Access to Technology, Effects of Technology on Self and Society, Health Care and Medicine, Innovations, Natural Phenomena, Science and Ethics
Contemporary Life	Education and Careers, Entertainment, Travel and Leisure, Lifestyles, Relationships, Social Customs and Values
Global Challenges	Economic Issues, Environmental Issues, Philosophical Thought and Religions, Population and Demographics, Social Welfare, Social Conscience

== The exam ==
As of May 2017, the exam, normally administered on a Tuesday morning in May, is divided into two sections with multiple parts each. Section One, Part A contains sections of reading comprehension, in which students read four different passages and then answer multiple-choice questions about them. This section is 40 minutes.

Section One, Part B contains readings with audio accompaniment and asks students multiple-choice questions to compare and contrast the two as well as synthesize each one individually. Section three contains audio presentations of approximately three minutes and has multiple-choice questions. The two sections combined are allotted 55 minutes.

In Section Two, Part 1A: Email Response, students respond to a formal email with a short response and ask questions to the author. This section is 15 minutes.

In Section Two, Part 2A: Argumentative Essay, is a formal writing component takes the shape of a document-based question. Students must use two sources and a recording to give a written response to the question.

Section Two, Part 1B: Interpersonal Speaking, is an informal or formal speaking section, where students are expected to interact with a recorded dialogue, during which they have 20 seconds to answer each section.

Section Two, Part 2B: Presentational Speaking, asks students to give a formal oral presentation with a cultural comparison document and have four minutes to prepare and two minutes to record.

The test is approximately 3 1/2 hours in length.

As of 2017, all audio responses must be digitally submitted online as a mp3 file. CD players are no longer accepted.

Section	Item Type	Number of Questions and % Weight of Final Score		Time
Section I	Multiple Choice		50%	95 minutes
Part A: Reading Section	Print Texts	30 questions	25%	40 minutes
Part B: Reading and Listening Section	Print and Audio Texts	35 questions	25%	55 minutes
Section II	Free Response		50%	90 minutes
Part A: Writing	Formal Writing: Email Response	1 prompt (12.5%); 15 minutes	25%	70 minutes
Part A: Writing	Formal Writing: Argumentative Essay	1 prompt (12.5%); 55 minutes	25%	70 minutes
Part B: Speaking	Interpersonal Speaking (Simulated Conversation)	5-6 response prompts (12.5%); 20 seconds to respond to each	25%	18 minutes
Part B: Speaking	Presentational Speaking (Cultural Comparison)	1 prompt (12.5%); 4 minutes to prepare, 2 minutes to respond	25%	18 minutes

== Grade distribution ==
Both tables range from 2014 and beyond since that is the last time the AP Spanish course and exam were changed.

The table below is the grade distribution combining both the native speakers and Standard Group:

Score	2014	2015	2016	2017	2018	2019	2020	2021	2022	2023	2024	2025	2026
5	24.6%	27.4%	27.8%	19.5%	23.2%	24.9%	30.5%	17.3%	23.6%	24.3%	21.2%	22%	21%
4	34.9%	35.1%	34.7%	34.8%	35.0%	34.6%	36.4%	39.7%	28.5%	30.0%	31.4%	32%	31%
3	29.8%	27.5%	26.9%	34.2%	30.1%	29.5%	23.1%	33.0%	29.7%	29.6%	30.4%	31%	31%
2	9.2%	8.7%	9.2%	10.0%	10.4%	9.3%	8.8%	16.5%	15.0%	13.5%	14.0%	12%	14%
1	1.5%	1.2%	1.4%	1.5%	1.3%	1.7%	1.2%	3.5%	3.3%	2.7%	3.0%	3%	3%
% of Scores 3 or Higher	89.3%	90.1%	89.4%	88.5%	88.3%	89.0%	90.0%	80.0%	81.7%	83.8%	82.9%	85%	83%
Mean	3.72	3.79	3.78	3.61	3.68	3.72	3.86	3.41	3.54	3.60	3.54		
Standard Deviation	0.98	0.98	1.00	0.96	0.98	0.99	0.99	1.06	1.10	1.08	1.07		
Number of Students	135,341	144,561	155,258	168,307	159,351	187,133	168,998	148,486	155,931	164,434	177,819	182,670	198,000

The table below is the grade distribution from the Standard Group:

Score	2014	2015	2016	2017	2018	2019	2020	2021	2022	2023	2024	2025
5	18.5%	19.1%	19.4%	15.9%	16.5%	15.2%	17.0%	12.9%	15.5%	16.1%	16.2%	15.3%
4	33.2%	32.9%	32.2%	31.9%	31.8%	31.2%	37.1%	27.9%	27.5%	29.1%	29.5%	29.3%
3	32.9%	33.3%	32.4%	35.9%	34.6%	35.9%	30.1%	36.3%	35.4%	35.1%	33.7%	35.9%
2	12.6%	12.5%	13.7%	13.6%	14.6%	14.6%	13.6%	19%	18.1%	16.4%	16.8%	16.3%
1	2.8%	2.3%	2.2%	2.7%	2.5%	3.0%	2.2%	3.9%	3.5%	3.2%	3.8%	3.2%
% of Scores 3 or Higher	84.6%	85.2%	84.0%	83.7%	82.9%	82.4%	84.2%	77.1%	78.4%	80.4%	79.4%	80.5%
Mean	3.52	3.54	3.53	3.45	3.45	3.41	3.53	3.27	3.33	3.39	3.38	3.37
Standard Deviation	1.02	1.01	1.02	1.00	1.01	1.01	1.00	1.03	1.05	1.04	1.06	1.03
Number of Students	41,627	47,188	50,753	54,839	58,909	59,243	55,905	50,916	48,717	46,503	48,576	40,949

On the other hand, when considering only native speakers, they tend to perform outstandingly well on their own due to being already fluent in the language. For example, in 2020 (the year when overall scores peaked in recent times), the percentage of native speakers who earned each score is as follows: 5 - 37.2%, 4 - 36.0%, 3 - 19.6%, 2 - 6.4%, and 1 - 0.7%. Based on these scores, 92.8% passed the exam, with nearly three quarters earning a 4 or 5, and the mean score for this demographic was 4.03.
