= El Monte City School District =

School district in California

Address
- 3540 North Lexington Avenue El Monte, California, 91731; United States

District information
- Type: Public
- Grades: K–8
- NCES District ID: 0612090

Students and staff
- Students: 7,589 (2020–2021)
- Teachers: 348.86 (FTE)
- Staff: 483.0 (FTE)
- Student–teacher ratio: 21.75:1

Other information
- Website: www.emcsd.org

The El Monte City School District is in El Monte, California. The district serves western and central El Monte and the southeastern portion of Temple City. It serves as a feeder district for El Monte Union High School District. It includes 14 elementary schools: eight serving grades K-6, and six serving grades K-8. The district also administers four Head Start sites, which are located at the elementary schools. Current district board members include Lisette I. Mendez, Beth Rivas, Julia Ruedas, David Siegrist, and Jennifer Cobian.

== Schools ==
- Cherrylee Elementary School
- Cleminson Elementary School
- Columbia Elementary School
- Cortada Elementary School
- Durfee Elementary School
- Gidley Elementary School
- Frank M. Wright Elementary School
- Legore Elementary School
- New Lexington Elementary School
- Potrero Elementary School
- Rio Hondo Elementary School
- Rio Vista Elementary School
- Shirpser Elementary School
- Wilkerson Elementary School
