= South El Monte High School =

Coordinates: 34.037°N 118.044°W

Location
- 1001 Durfee Ave. South El Monte, California 91733

Information
- School type: Public
- Motto: A community where everyone thinks independently, works collaboratively, and lives responsibly.
- Established: 1992
- School district: El Monte Union High School District
- Principal: Olga Lopez
- Teaching staff: 62.21 (FTE)
- Grades: 9 – 12
- Enrollment: 1,240 (2018–19)
- Student to teacher ratio: 19.93
- Schedule type: Block
- Colors: Gold, navy, and white
- Athletics conference: CIF Southern Section; Mission Valley League
- Nickname: Eagles
- Website: semhs.emuhsd.org

South El Monte High School is a high school in South El Monte, California in the Los Angeles metropolitan area. It is a part of the El Monte Union High School District.

Asahi Gakuen, a part-time Japanese school, operates its San Gabriel campus (サンゲーブル校 Sangēburu-kō) at South El Monte High School.

In 2018, a 17-year-old boy who attended the high school was killed by his 16-year-old boyfriend and football teammate.
