= Jerry Voorhis =

Democratic politician from California

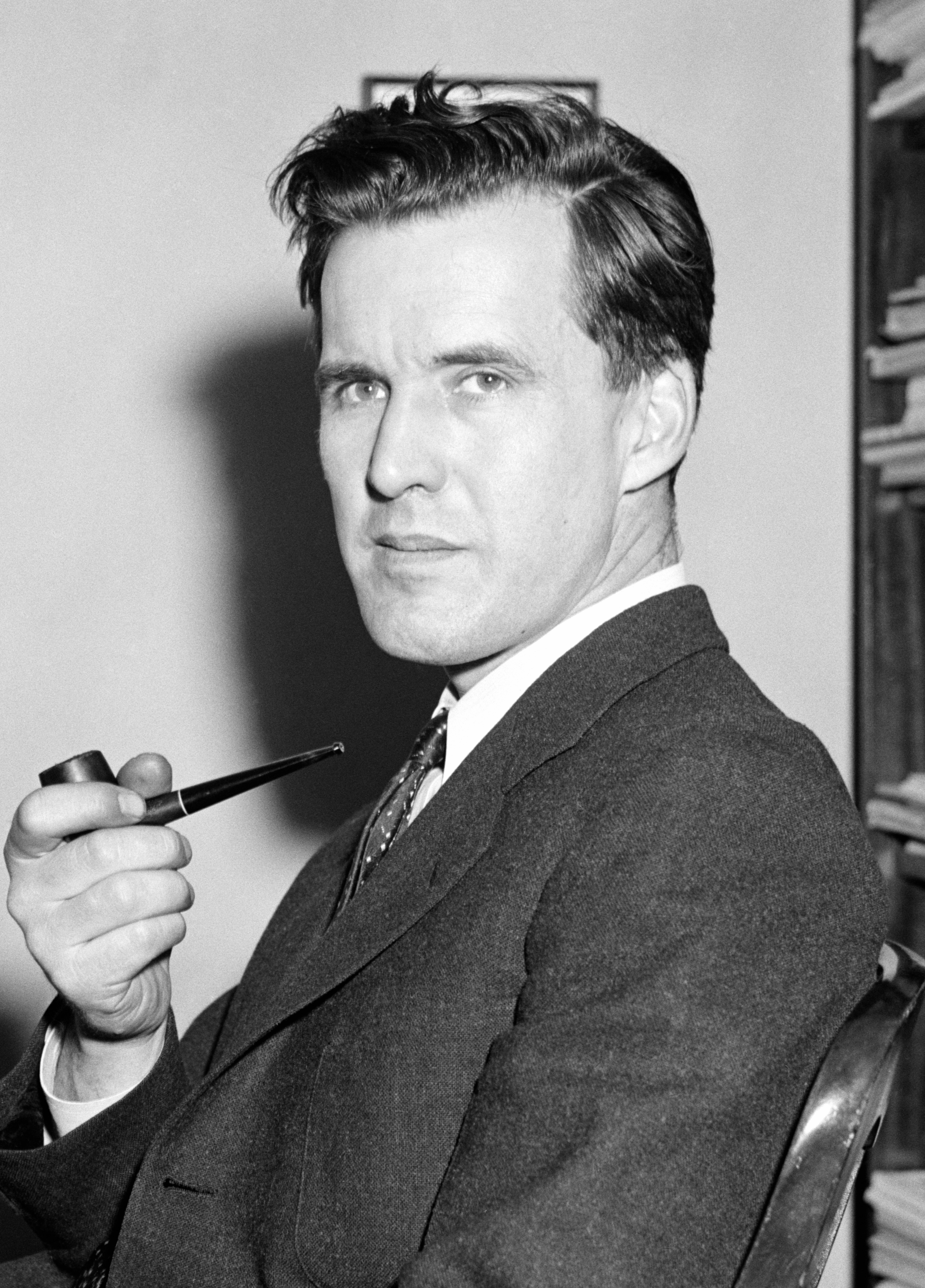
- Voorhis in 1939

Member of the U.S. House of Representatives from California's 12th district
- In office January 3, 1937 – January 3, 1947
- Preceded by: John H. Hoeppel
- Succeeded by: Richard Nixon

Personal details
- Born: Horace Jeremiah Voorhis; April 6, 1901 Ottawa, Kansas, U.S.
- Died: September 11, 1984 (aged 83) Claremont, California, U.S.
- Party: Socialist (before 1934); Democratic (after 1934)
- Spouse: Alice Louise Livingston (m. 1924)
- Education: Yale University; Claremont College

Horace Jeremiah "Jerry" Voorhis (April 6, 1901 – September 11, 1984) was an American politician and educator who served five terms in the United States House of Representatives representing California from 1937 to 1947. A member of the Democratic Party, he represented the 12th congressional district in Los Angeles County. He was the first political opponent of Richard M. Nixon, who defeated Voorhis for re-election in 1946 in a campaign cited as the first example of Nixon's use of red-baiting tactics during his political rise.

Voorhis was born in Kansas, but the family relocated frequently in his childhood. He earned a bachelor's degree from Yale University (where he was elected to the academic honor society Phi Beta Kappa) and a master's degree in education from Claremont Graduate School. In 1928, he founded the Voorhis School for Boys and became its headmaster. He retained the post into his congressional career.

In the House of Representatives, Voorhis was a loyal supporter of the New Deal and compiled a liberal voting record. His major legislative achievement was the Voorhis Act of 1940 requiring registration of certain organizations controlled by foreign powers. After being re-elected by comfortable margins four times, he faced Nixon in 1946 in a bitter campaign in which Voorhis's supposed endorsement by groups linked to the Communist Party was made into a major issue. Nixon won the Republican-leaning district by over 15,000 votes and Voorhis refused to run against him in 1948.

During a writing career spanning a half-century, Voorhis penned several books. Following his defeat by Nixon, he retired from politics and worked for almost twenty years as an executive in the cooperative movement. He died in a California retirement home in 1984 at the age of 83.

== Early life and education ==
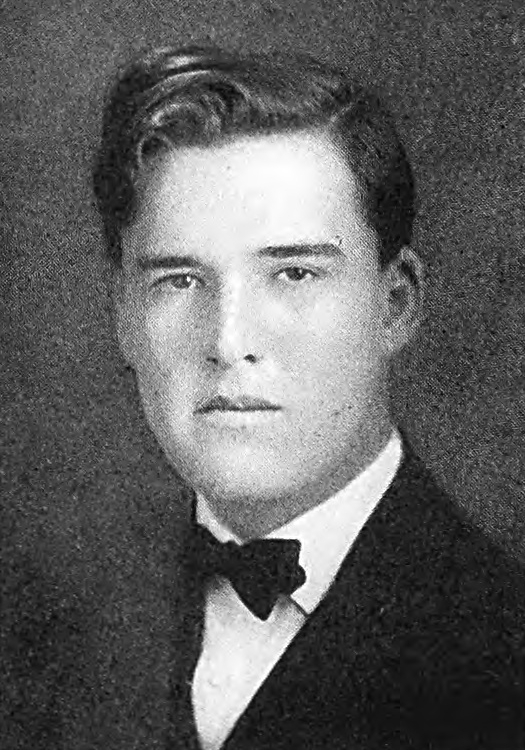
Voorhis's Yale University yearbook photo, 1923

Voorhis was born in Ottawa, Kansas, on April 6, 1901, to Charles Brown Voorhis, of Dutch descent, and Ella Ward (Smith) Voorhis. Jerry was the grandson (and future biographer) of Aurelius Lyman Voorhis, who had "ventured out to the frontier in western Kansas" as merchant, land agent, and self-taught lawyer, and had scraped to send his son to college until he was forced, halfway through, to give his son the only two dollars he could spare and advise him to get a job. Charles Voorhis took work in an investment company and as a semi-professional baseball player and rose to become an executive of the Kingman Plow Company. When that company dissolved, Charles Voorhis became an executive of the Oakland Motor Car Company, which became the Pontiac division of General Motors, and finally of the Nash Motor Company before his 1925 retirement.

Jerry Voorhis began school in Ottawa, but also attended school in Oklahoma City, Peoria, Illinois and Pontiac, Michigan. He attended the Hotchkiss School, an elite boys' boarding school in Connecticut with close ties to Yale University, and subsequently attended Yale, graduating in 1923. Voorhis was elected as a member of Phi Beta Kappa, was president of the Christian Association, and was greatly influenced by the Social Gospel movement, which gave its blessing to Christian socialism.

Voorhis resisted all encouragement toward a business or management career, much to his father's disappointment. While attending Yale, he came to believe that "the Christian Gospel is to be taken seriously, and that needless poverty and suffering on the one hand and special privilege and inordinate power on the other are entirely contrary to its precepts". He later stated that he lacked the faith in his own judgment to leave Yale and get a job in "the real world [which] lay beyond the college walls".

== Blue-collar work and boys academy ==
After graduating, Voorhis engaged a room at a boarding house and went to work as a receiving clerk, a job he soon exchanged for one as a freight handler. Later in 1923, he was laid off. In 1923 and 1924, he served as a traveling representative for the YMCA in Germany, though his stay was cut short by illness. Suffering from pneumonia, Voorhis spent six weeks recovering in a London nursing home.

Charles Voorhis's job with Nash had taken him to a new home in Kenosha, Wisconsin; Jerry Voorhis joined his parents there on his return from Europe. As part of his recovery from his illness, he spent several weeks in northwestern Wyoming, working on a ranch. In Kenosha, he met a social worker named Alice Louise Livingston, and married her on November 27, 1924, in her hometown of Washington, Iowa. Resuming his blue-collar career after his marriage, Voorhis moved to North Carolina with his wife and went to work in a Ford plant in Charlotte until being offered work as a teacher in an Illinois school for underprivileged boys, teaching three grades, coaching sports, and giving religious talks in the school's chapel each morning. This was followed by a year in Laramie, Wyoming, where the Voorhises founded and ran an orphanage for boys.

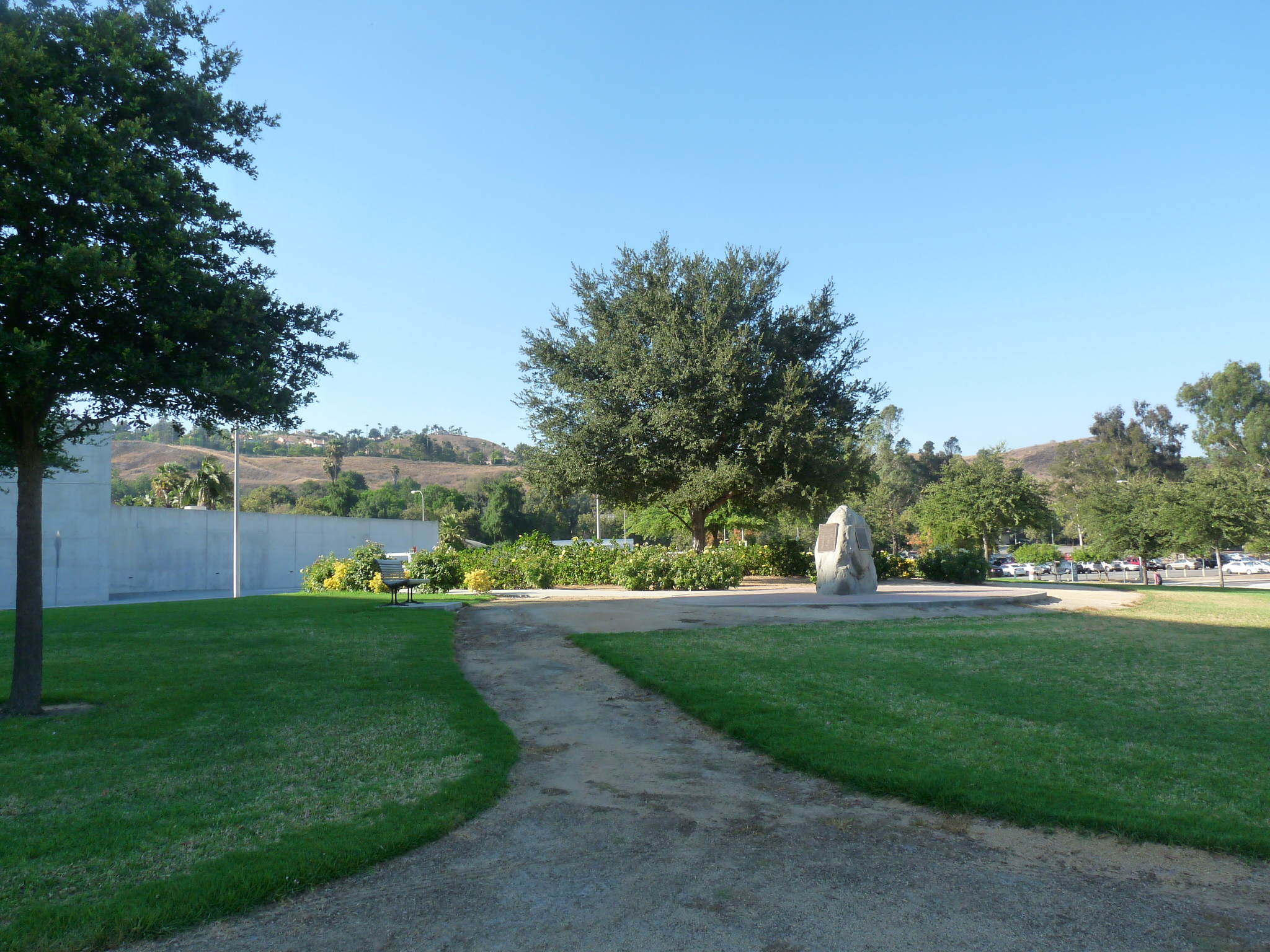
Voorhis Park, Cal Poly Pomona, containing a stone from the Voorhis School campus

In 1927, the now-retired Charles Voorhis offered his son an opportunity to found a boys academy near the elder Voorhis's home in Pasadena, California. Jerry Voorhis responded by moving to California. In 1928, he founded and became headmaster of the Voorhis School for Boys in San Dimas, California, a post he retained after his election to Congress. In addition to academic tutelage, the Voorhis School's boys received training in farming, mechanical work, and other manual vocations. Charles and Jerry Voorhis would put much of the family fortune into the school. After Voorhis's election to Congress, the school would be closed down, with the land and buildings donated to California State Polytechnic University, Pomona (Cal Poly Pomona), later serving as the university's Southern California campus until it moved in 1950 to Pomona. Voorhis remained in close touch with his school's alumni.

Voorhis also involved himself in the local community. He organized cooperatives among the local ranchers and farmers. When strikes occurred, he would walk the picket lines with the workers. Voorhis gave lectures at Pomona College from 1930 until 1935. He began publishing articles, writing in 1933, "We could produce plenty for all, but we don't do it ... we will do it only when all producing wealth is owned publicly. ... Incidentally, we would then be living in the kingdom of God."

== Political career ==
In the late 1920s and early 1930s, Voorhis was registered to vote as a Socialist. When he ran for a seat in the California State Assembly in 1934, he changed his party registration from Socialist and ran as a Democrat. Voorhis received the backing of the crusading socialist writer Upton Sinclair, who was the Democratic gubernatorial candidate, but was defeated by popular incumbent Herbert Evans.

=== Congressional service ===
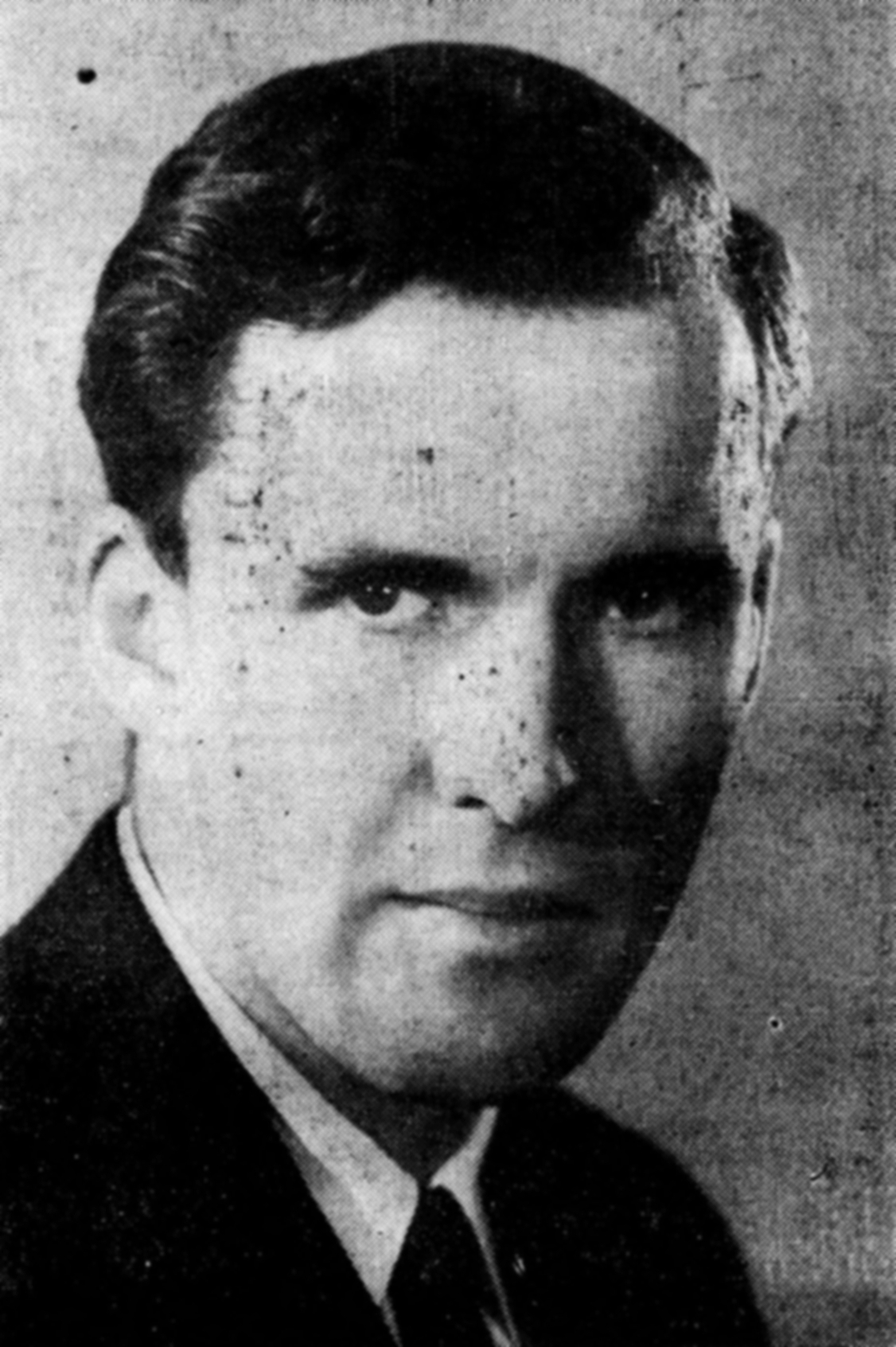
Voorhis as a candidate for Congress, 1936

Two years later, in 1936, Voorhis challenged incumbent John Hoeppel for the Democratic nomination in the 12th Congressional district. Hoeppel had been weakened by a recent conviction for attempting to sell a nomination to West Point, and Voorhis won the Democratic primary, with Hoeppel finishing in third place. Running as a "Progressive Roosevelt-Democrat", Voorhis easily defeated Republican nominee Frederick F. Houser in the general election.

Voorhis was reelected to Congress four times and had one of Congress's most liberal voting records. He supported New Deal initiatives, including Franklin Roosevelt's controversial court packing plan.

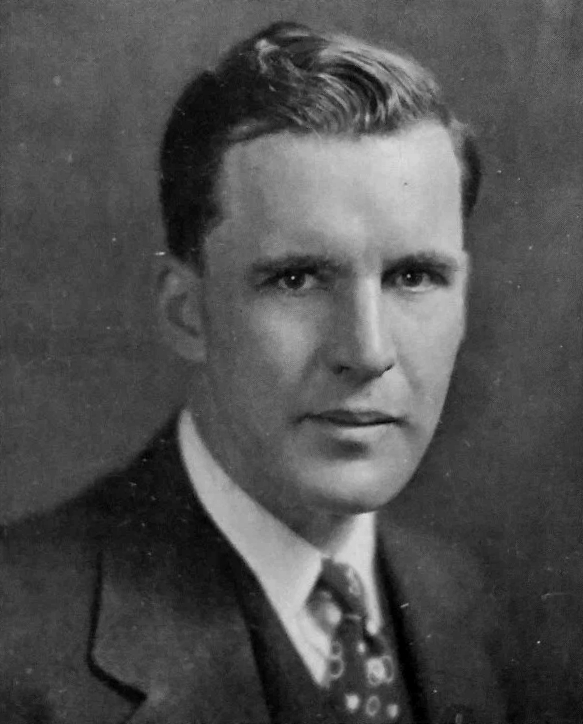
Portrait by Underwood & Underwood, 1940

In January 1937, Voorhis's first legislative initiative was to propose a dramatic increase in spending for the Works Progress Administration in order to increase employment. While this effort was unsuccessful, Congress, faced with an economic downturn the following year, increased WPA spending beyond the level which Voorhis had sought. While the 75th Congress had in excess of 300 Democrats, many of them were conservative, and Voorhis emerged as a leader of a progressive caucus of some 50 representatives.

Voorhis worked legislatively on monetary reforms like the Chicago Plan. He believed the federal government should not have to take on debt to create money. In 1938, Voorhis proposed legislation end fractional-reserve banking through the Federal Government purchasing the stock in the Federal Reserve Banks from member banks. This would finance government expenditures without issuing debt, and briefly got President Roosevelt to support the measure until the President's advisers caused Roosevelt to change his mind. Voorhis later allied with future House Banking Committee chairman Wright Patman to force Federal Reserve Banks to pay most of the interest they earned on federal securities to the U.S. Government, rather than to the bank stockholders.

In the run-up to World War II, Voorhis urged neutrality. He proposed enactment of a law which would require a national referendum on whether to go to war. According to Voorhis, laws banning the sale of munitions to foreign nations and forbidding Americans from making loans to other nations for war preparations would keep the United States out of war. In September 1939, when interviewed by The New York Times for his reaction to the President calling Congress into special session to consider amendments to the Neutrality Act, Voorhis stated that a special session should quickly increase relief to the working poor. In early November 1939, however, Voorhis announced his support for repealing the arms embargo mandated by the Act, at the same time urging that the country remain neutral. Voorhis also opposed a peacetime draft, and supported "lend-lease" legislation.

Once war was declared, Voorhis supported the internment of Japanese-Americans, though he suggested that the evacuations be done in as voluntary a manner as possible and that officials be appointed to administer their property to avoid forced sales at bargain prices. During the war, Voorhis advocated more efficiently taxing higher incomes and war profits, planning against postwar unemployment, and planning for the nutritional needs of Americans. Voorhis also opposed dominance of big business in the war effort. Congress, for the most part, ignored Voorhis's pleas.

Voorhis often opposed the petroleum industry, questioning the need for the oil depletion allowance. In 1943, he was told by a Pasadena attorney that the Navy Department was planning to grant Standard Oil exclusive free drilling rights in the vast Elk Hills naval reserve in central California, then thought to be the richest oil reserve outside the Arabian Peninsula. The congressman in a speech from the House floor in May 1943 exposed the deal, which was soon cancelled. The Washington Post hailed him as a hero, and House Naval Affairs Committee Chairman Carl Vinson of Georgia stated that Voorhis had performed "the greatest kind of service". However, the Los Angeles Times suggested that Voorhis had harmed the war effort by depriving the people of California of gasoline. In 1945, Voorhis fought a bill which would have given oil companies offshore drilling rights. The petroleum industry journal Second Issue blamed the defeat of the bill on Voorhis. Nixon biographer Roger Morris suggested that these stands led oil companies to give Nixon substantial, but surreptitious, financial assistance during the 1946 campaign against Voorhis.

=== Record and campaigns ===
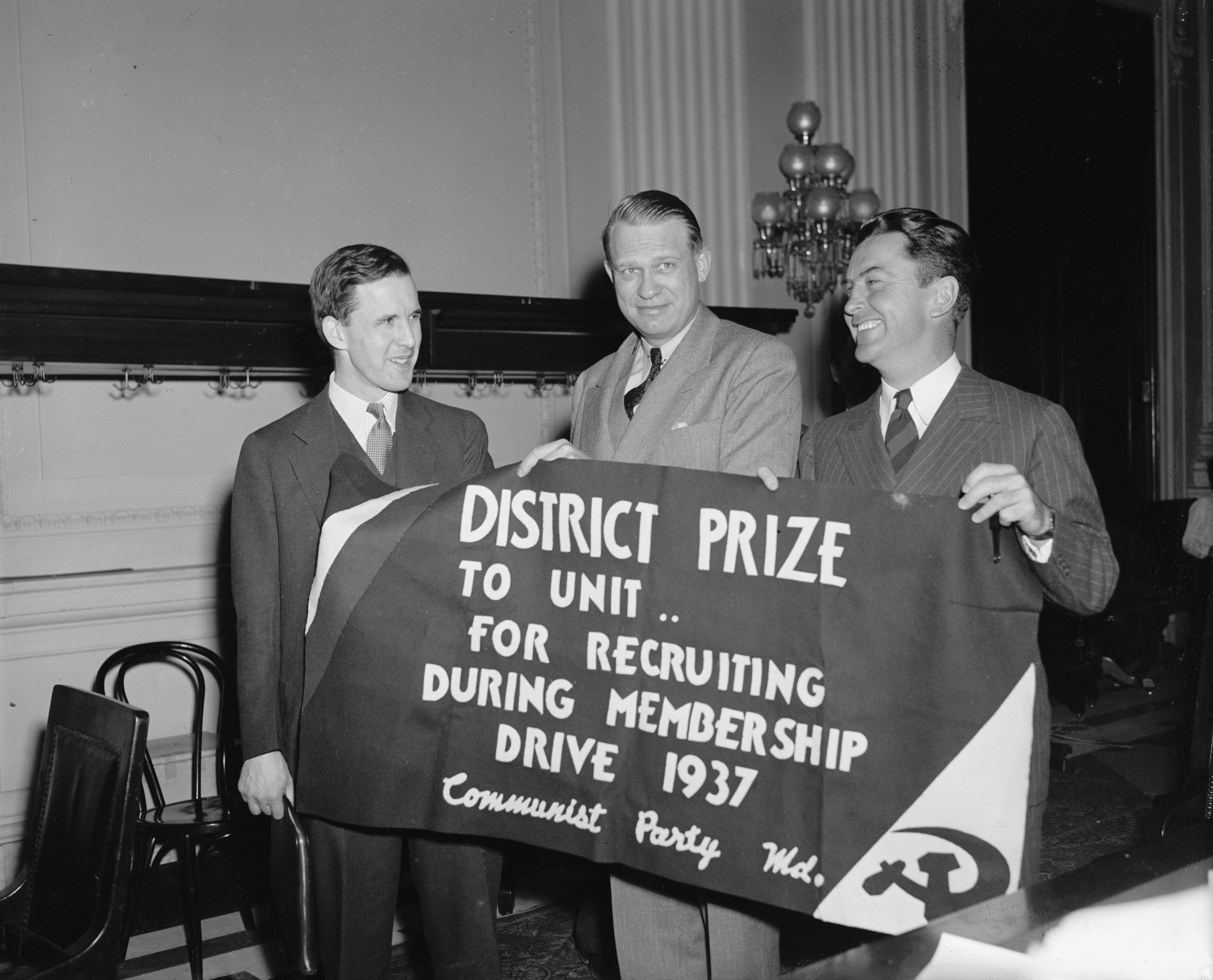
Representatives Voorhis, Dies, and Casey holding a Communist Party recruitment flag seized in a raid on a Baltimore, Maryland office, March 20, 1940

Voorhis "temperamentally and philosophically loathed" communism. He sponsored the Voorhis Act of 1940, which required political organizations which were controlled by a foreign power or which engaged in military activities to subvert the American government to register with the Justice Department. Voorhis also served as a member of the House Un-American Activities Committee (HUAC) though Time magazine stated he could be "counted upon ... to temper rightist blasts for leftist lambs".

Voorhis was generally highly regarded by his colleagues and others in Washington. Senator Paul Douglas of Illinois considered Voorhis "a political saint", and said of Voorhis, "Driven by conscience, he had a compulsion to master every subject that came before the House, and having mastered it, he spoke his mind." Voorhis would make five-minute speeches in the House of Representatives at any opportunity, on matters ranging from local concerns in his district to international monetary issues. The press nicknamed him "Kid Atlas", seeming to carry the weight of the world on his shoulders. The press corps also voted him the most honest congressman, and the fifth most intelligent. However, Interior Secretary Harold Ickes described Voorhis's 1943 resignation from HUAC as the representative being "[w]obbly as usual".

Voorhis's 12th district leaned Republican, the more so after Voorhis survived an attempt, in 1941, to gerrymander him out of office by removing strong Democratic precincts from the 12th during the decennial redistricting. Nevertheless, Voorhis was re-elected by 13,000 votes in 1942, and by a similar margin two years later. Despite the Republican leanings of his district, Voorhis had not faced any strong opposition prior to 1946. Elected as part of the Roosevelt landslide of 1936, in 1938 he faced an opponent so shy that Voorhis had to introduce him to the crowd at a joint appearance. In 1940, he faced a military school principal, and his 1942 opponent, radio preacher and former Prohibition Party gubernatorial candidate Robert P. Shuler, "even embarrassed GOP regulars". In 1944, the 12th district Republicans were bitterly divided, and Voorhis easily triumphed.

Voorhis was a conscientious congressman towards his constituents, careful to remember births, anniversaries, and in-district events. In fact, after the birth of Tricia Nixon near the start of the 1946 campaign, Voorhis's office sent the Nixon family a copy of a government publication called Infant Care, of which members of Congress received 150 copies a month. On April 1, 1946, Richard Nixon sent Voorhis a thank you letter for the pamphlet.

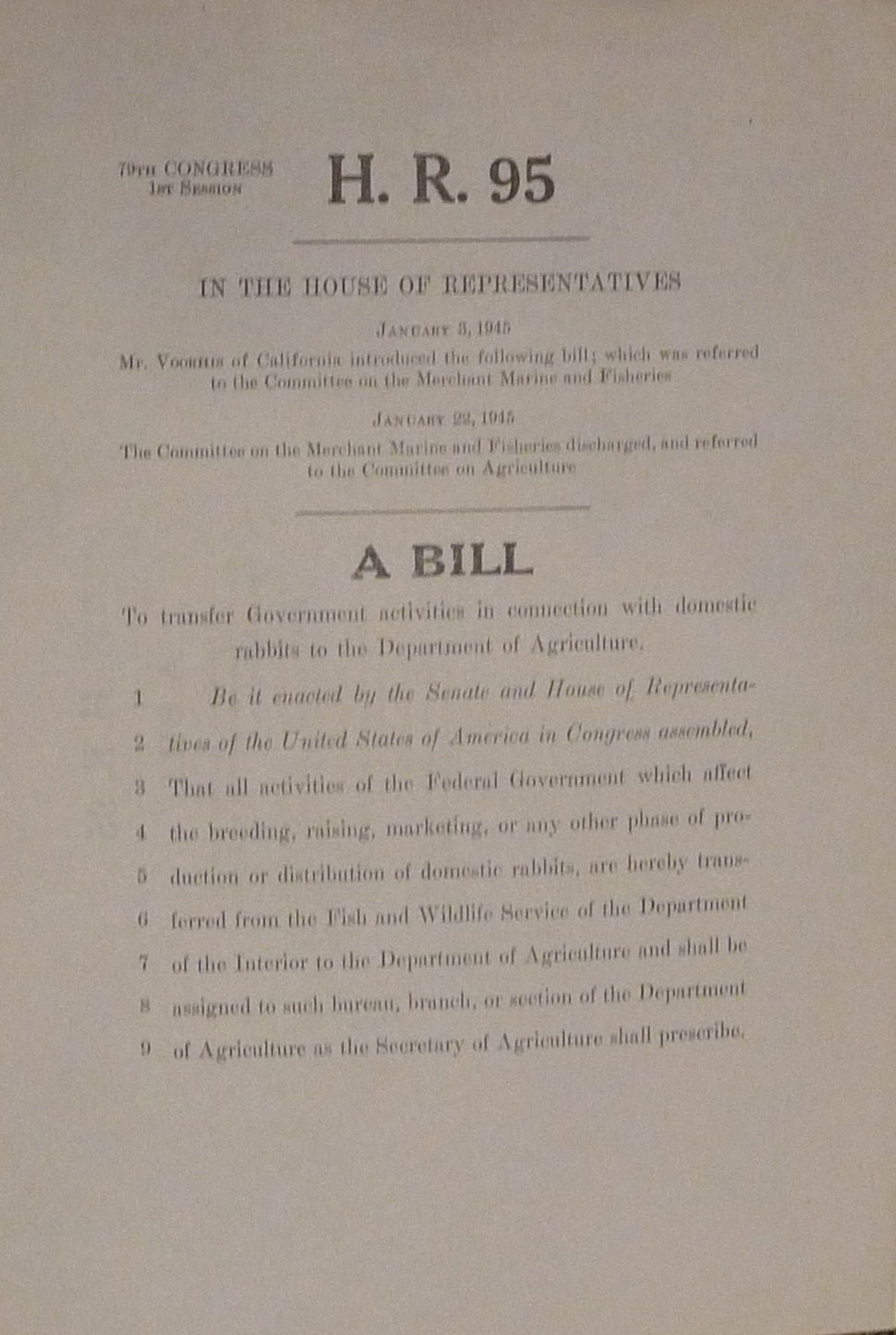
Voorhis's bill to transfer jurisdiction over rabbits

Aside from the act named for him, Voorhis succeeded in enacting few new laws, a fact Nixon used against him in 1946 when he argued that Voorhis's legislation had only "transferred jurisdiction over the raising of rabbits from one government department to another." The New York Times wrote of him in 1947, "He was ineffectual in terms of practical results."

==== 1946 campaign ====
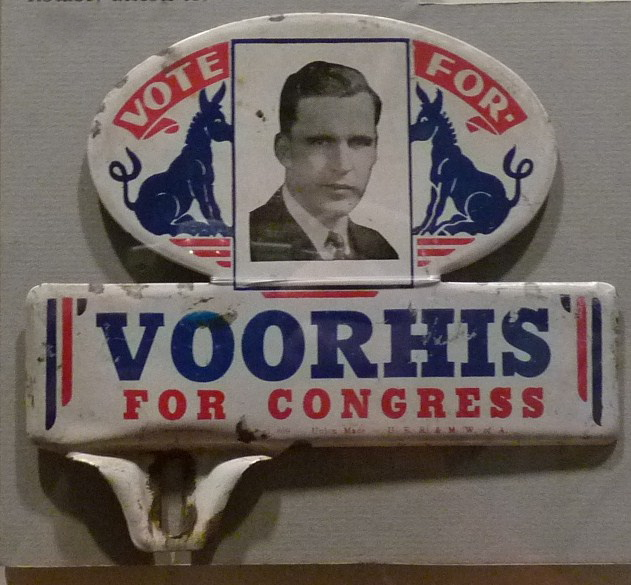
License plate attachment promoting Voorhis's candidacy

As Voorhis served his fifth term in the House, local Republicans searched for a candidate capable of defeating him. Richard Nixon answered the call. Nixon, who was still in the Navy when approached, wrote of Voorhis, "His 'conservative' reputation must be blasted. But my main efforts are being directed toward building up a positive, progressive group of speeches that tell what we want to do, not what the Democrats have failed to do ... I'm really hopped up over this deal, and I believe we can win." However, "wheelhorse" Republicans deemed Nixon's campaign hopeless.

As was usual in California at the time, both Nixon and Voorhis cross-filed in the other party's primary, a practice Voorhis had long adopted. Winning both primaries virtually assured election. Each candidate won his own party's primary, with Voorhis garnering a considerable number of votes in the Republican primary, and outpolling Nixon by 7,000 votes overall. Nixon gained momentum, however, when the newspapers pointed out that Voorhis's total percentage of the vote had decreased from 60% in 1944 to 53.5%.

Voorhis had the advantage of incumbency, but this was balanced by other factors favoring Nixon. Due to the pressure of Congressional business, Voorhis was able to devote only two months to the campaign, while Nixon campaigned in the district for ten months. Voorhis's time was further limited when, while en route to California from Washington D.C. in August, he was forced to have surgery for hemorrhoids in Ogden, Utah. He spent two weeks in an Ogden hotel recuperating from the operation.

Nixon alleged that a vote against Voorhis was "a vote against the P.A.C. Political Action Committee, affiliated with the Congress of Industrial Organizations (CIO), its Communist principles, and its gigantic slush fund." The Nixon campaign distributed 25,000 thimbles labeled "Nixon for Congress/Put the needle in the P.A.C."

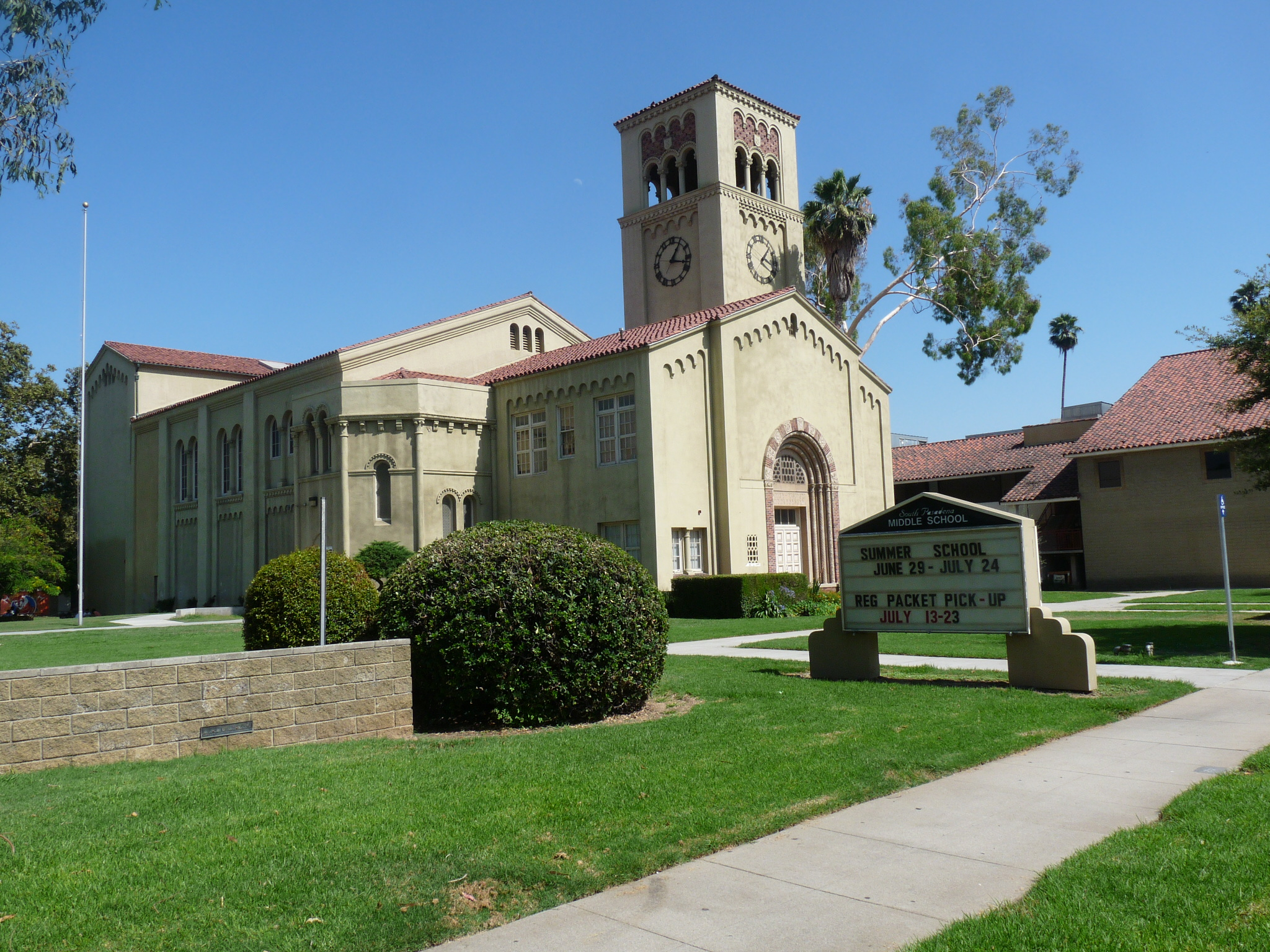
South Pasadena Middle School (formerly South Pasadena Junior High School)

Voorhis's supposed involvement with and endorsement by the CIO-PAC, which was believed to be a Communist front organization, was a major issue in the campaign. Nixon's campaign manager claimed to have proof of Voorhis's involvement with the group. On September 13, the two candidates met at a debate at South Pasadena Junior High School. When Nixon was challenged to produce proof of the allegation, Nixon took from his pocket a local bulletin of the National Citizens Political Action Committee that contained an endorsement of Voorhis. That was a different group, also affiliated with the CIO. While Voorhis's staff was aware of the endorsement, no one had told the representative. Voorhis, confronted with the bulletin, noted that they were two different groups. Nixon responded by reading the names of the boards of directors of the two groups, with many names in common. After the debate, Voorhis asked Congressman Chester E. Holifield for his view of how it had gone, and Holifield responded, "Jerry, he cut you to pieces." Voorhis had been successfully linked with "the PAC", though he had refused to accept the endorsement of any PAC unless it renounced Communist influence. Nixon defeated Voorhis by over 15,000 votes, and Time magazine praised the future president for "politely avoid[ing] personal attacks on his opponent".

The day after the election, Voorhis issued a concession statement, "I have given the best years of my life to serving this district in Congress. By the will of the people, that work is ended. I have no regrets about the record I have written." In his 1947 book, Confessions of a Congressman, Voorhis attributed his defeat to tremendous amounts of money supposedly spent by the Nixon forces. When Nixon read the book, he commented, "What I am wondering is where all the money went that we were supposed to have had!"

Nixon's defeat of Voorhis has been cited as the start of a number of red-baiting campaigns by the future president that later elevated him to the Senate and the vice presidency, and eventually put him in position to run for president. Voorhis later deemed himself "the first victim of the Nixon-Chotiner formula for political success." In 1958, Voorhis alleged that voters had received anonymous phone calls alleging that he was a Communist, that newspapers had stated that he was a fellow traveler, and that when Nixon got angry, he would "do anything."

In spite of any hard feelings, Voorhis sent Nixon a letter of congratulations in early December 1946. The two men met for an hour at Voorhis's office and parted as friends, according to Voorhis. Voorhis's final letter as a congressman, on December 31, was to his father, who had been his political adviser throughout his congressional career, "It has been primarily due to your help, your confidence, your advice ... above all to a feeling I have always had that your hand was on my shoulder. Thanks ... God bless you."

== Later life ==
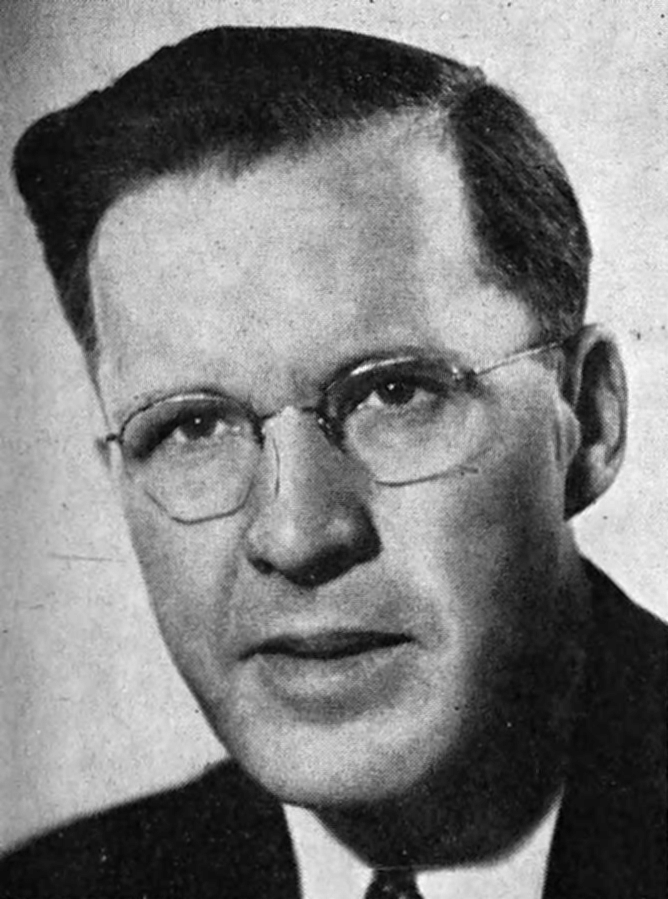
Voorhis c. 1951

After leaving office, Voorhis remained in his Alexandria, Virginia, house, completing his book, Confessions of a Congressman. In early 1947, he was offered the job of executive director of the Cooperative League of the USA. The Voorhis family relocated to Winnetka, Illinois, near the League's Chicago headquarters. The League, which included both consumer and producer cooperatives, had fallen on hard times in the postwar period. Under his leadership, the League's financial position gradually improved and some major cooperatives that had remained aloof from the League were persuaded to join. The League expanded its purview, founding the Group Health Association of America and the National Association of Housing Cooperatives.

Voorhis was urged to run again for Congress against Nixon in 1948 by Stephen Zetterberg, who, when Voorhis declined (in part for health reasons), himself ran in the Democratic primary. Nixon, facing no opposition in the Republican primary, entered and won the Democratic poll, eliminating Zetterberg from the race and ensuring his re-election.

In 1954, the former congressman led the U.S. delegation to the International Cooperative Alliance congress in Paris, successfully opposing Soviet plans to give greater representation to Eastern European countries, which was seen as a means of eventual communist control of the organization. Voorhis occasionally testified before Congressional committees, usually in opposition to bills which would tax cooperatives. He shut down the League's moribund New York office and opened an office in Los Angeles. Voorhis encouraged the forming of cooperatives in Latin America and in 1963, the first hemisphere-wide conference of cooperatives took place in Montevideo, Uruguay. Stanley Dreyer, Voorhis's eventual successor as executive director, was put in charge of these international operations. In January 1967, Voorhis retired from the League.

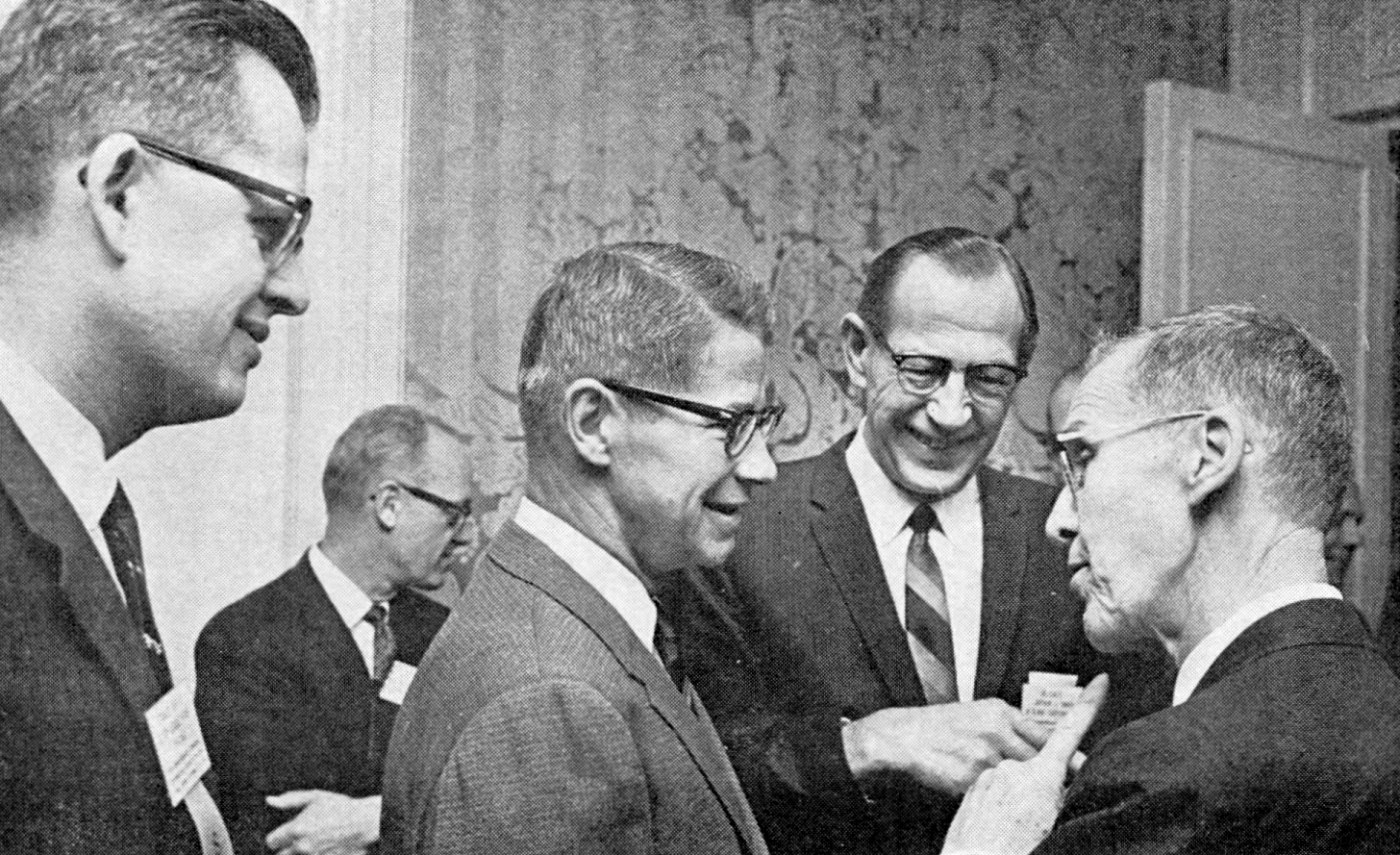
Voorhis (far right) meets with Secretary of Agriculture Orville Freeman (center) c. 1966

Five days after Nixon's defeat in the 1962 California gubernatorial election, Voorhis appeared on TV as a Nixon detractor, with Murray Chotiner and Republican Michigan Congressman Gerald Ford defending the former vice-president on Howard K. Smith's ABC News and Comment program, "The Political Obituary of Richard M. Nixon". Voorhis complained about the way Nixon had conducted himself in the 1946 race. but was overshadowed by fellow detractor and Nixon nemesis Alger Hiss. Hiss's participation led to such an uproar that sponsors pulled back from underwriting the program, and News and Comment left the air in the spring of 1963.

Having spent 23 years in Winnetka, Voorhis moved back with his wife to the old 12th district to an apartment in Claremont. After almost a quarter century of silence on his defeat by Nixon, he wrote The Strange Case of Richard Milhous Nixon, a book in which he stated that Nixon was "quite a ruthless opponent" whose "one cardinal and unbreakable rule of conduct" was "to win, whatever it takes to do it". "I did not expect my loyalty to America's constitutional government to be attacked," he wrote.

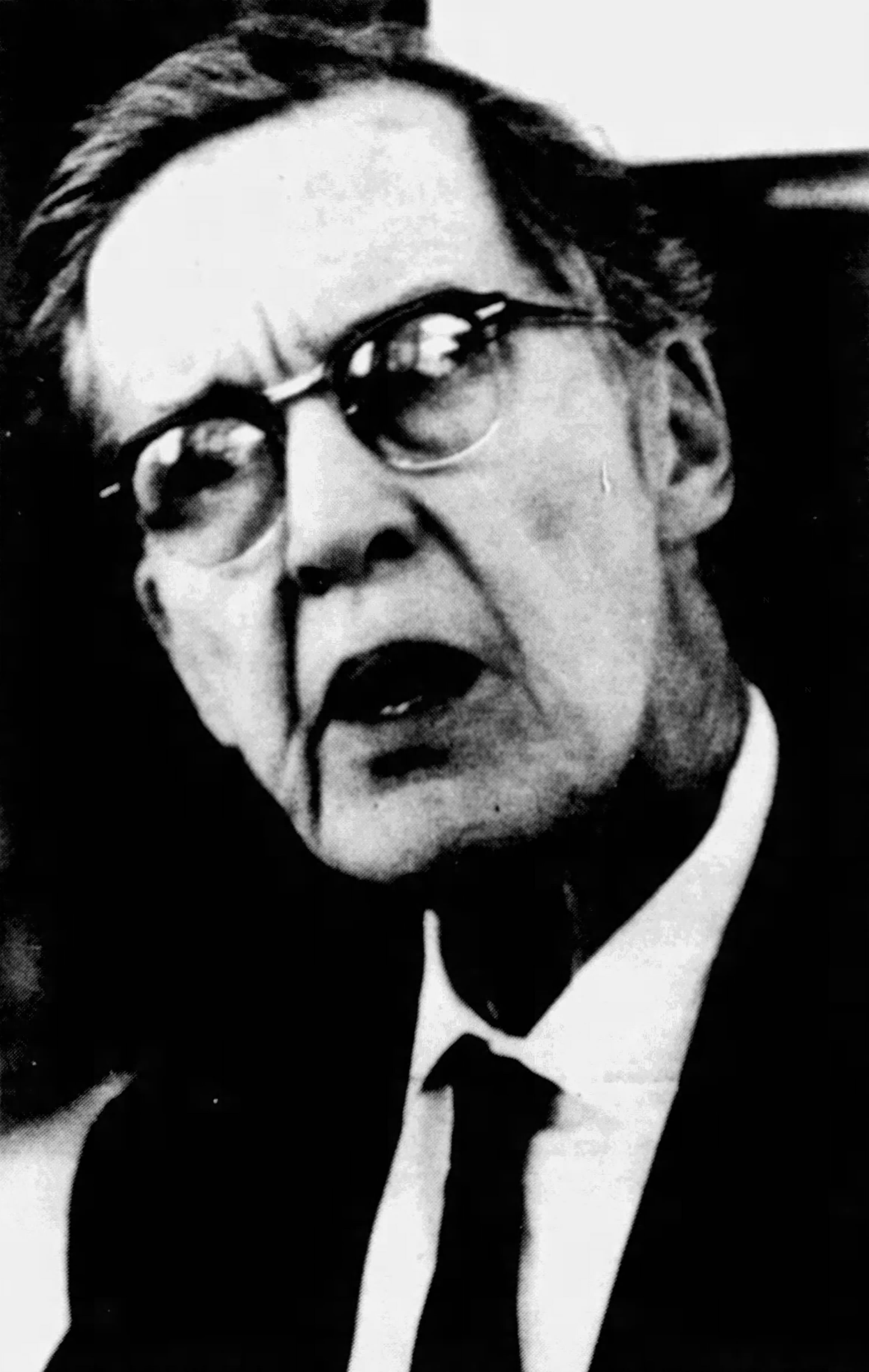
Voorhis addresses University of Utah students, October 15, 1973

As the Nixon presidency slowly collapsed, Voorhis spoke out more frequently. In 1972, he said, "Sour grapes to criticize the man who beat me, but I just wouldn't be human if I said I liked spending the second half of my life as 'the man who Nixon beat'". After Nixon resigned as president, Voorhis noted, "Here is the philosophy of doing-anything-to-win receiving its just and proper reward." Voorhis, believing he had been labeled a subversive by Nixon, "took some satisfaction" in stating that Nixon himself had been the subversive, seeking, according to Voorhis, to impose "a virtual dictatorship" on the country.

In 1972, Voorhis and his wife entered a retirement home in Claremont. Nonetheless, he continued to work on a number of committees and advisory boards. His activities ranged from the California Commission on Aging (appointed by Governor Jerry Brown) to working as a teacher's aide to Tom Hayden's Campaign for Economic Democracy.

=== Death and legacy ===
Voorhis died at the retirement home from emphysema on September 11, 1984. In addition to his widow, he left two sons and a daughter. Fellow Nixon opponent and former California governor Pat Brown eulogized him, saying, "He was a great man. Not many like him these days." Voorhis is buried in Mountain View Cemetery in Altadena, California. His papers are held by The Claremont Colleges Library Special Collections and California State Polytechnic University, Pomona's Special Collections.

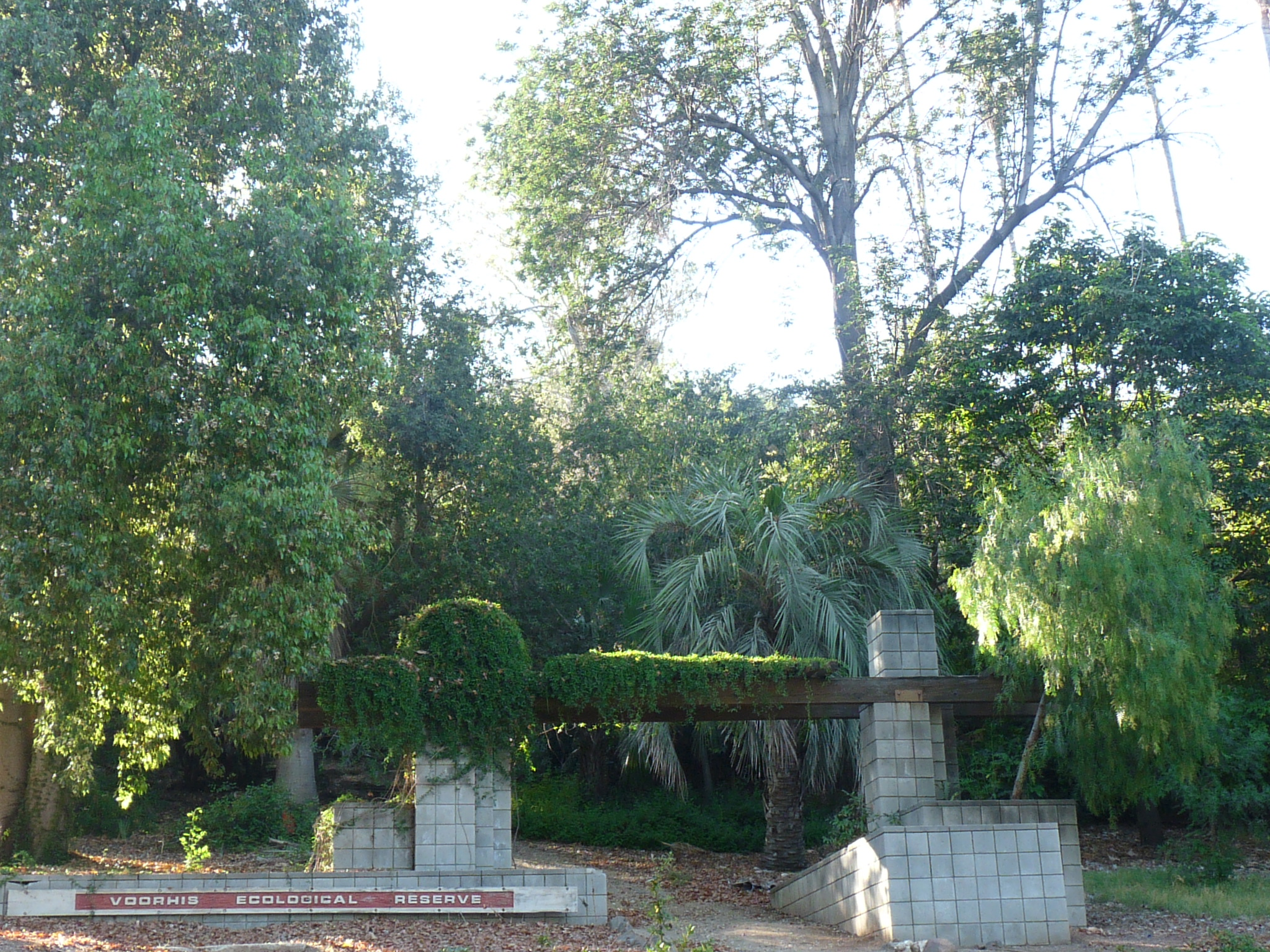
Voorhis Ecological Reserve, Cal Poly Pomona

An elementary school in El Monte, California, is named for the former congressman. Cal Poly Pomona considers Voorhis one of its founders and has named a park and an ecological reserve for him.

== Electoral history ==
1936 United States House of Representatives elections
Party	Candidate	Votes	%
Democratic	Jerry Voorhis	62,034	53.7%
Republican	Frederick F. Houser	53,445	46.3%
Total votes		115,479	100.0%
Turnout			
Democratic hold			

1938 United States House of Representatives elections
Party	Candidate	Votes	%
Democratic	Jerry Voorhis (Incumbent)	75,003	60.8%
Republican	Eugene W. Nixon	40,457	32.8%
Townsend	Russell R. Hand	7,903	6.4%
Total votes		123,363	100.0%
Turnout			
Democratic hold			

1940 United States House of Representatives elections
Party	Candidate	Votes	%
Democratic	Jerry Voorhis (Incumbent)	99,494	64.0%
Republican	Eugene W. Nixon	54,731	35.2%
Communist	Albert Lewis	1,152	0.8%
Total votes		155,377	100.0%
Turnout			
Democratic hold			

1942 United States House of Representatives elections
Party	Candidate	Votes	%
Democratic	Jerry Voorhis (Incumbent)	53,705	56.8%
Republican	Robert P. Shuler	40,780	43.2%
Total votes		94,485	100.0%
Turnout			
Democratic hold			

1944 United States House of Representatives elections
Party	Candidate	Votes	%
Democratic	Jerry Voorhis (Incumbent)	77,385	55.3%
Republican	Roy P. McLaughlin	62,524	44.7%
Total votes		139,909	100.0%
Turnout			
Democratic hold			

1946 United States House of Representatives elections
Party	Candidate	Votes	%
Republican	Richard Nixon	65,586	56.0%
Democratic	Jerry Voorhis (Incumbent)	49,994	42.7%
Prohibition	John Henry Hoeppel	1,476	1.3%
Total votes		117,056	100.0%
Turnout			
Republican gain from Democratic			

== See also ==
- List of members of the House Un-American Activities Committee

== Bibliography ==
- The Education of the Institution Boy (M.A. thesis) 1928
- The Story of Voorhis School for Boys. 1932
- The Morale of Democracy. 1941
- Out of Debt, Out of Danger. Proposals for War Finance and Tomorrow's Money. 1943
- Beyond Victory. 1944
- Confessions of a Congressman, 1947
- The Christian in Politics. 1951
- American Cooperatives. Where They Come From, What They Do, Where They are Going. 1961 (Reprint 1973)
- Credit Unions. Basic Cooperatives. 1965
- The Strange Case of Richard Milhous Nixon. 1972 (Reprint 1973)
- Cooperative Enterprise: The Little People's Chance in a World of Bigness. 1975
- The Life and Times of Aurelius Lyman Voorhis. 1976
- Confession of Faith. 1978

U.S. House of Representatives
Preceded by John H. Hoeppel	Member of the U.S. House of Representatives from California's 12th congressional district 1937–1947	Succeeded by Richard Nixon
