= John H. Hoeppel =

Democratic politician from California

John Hoeppel
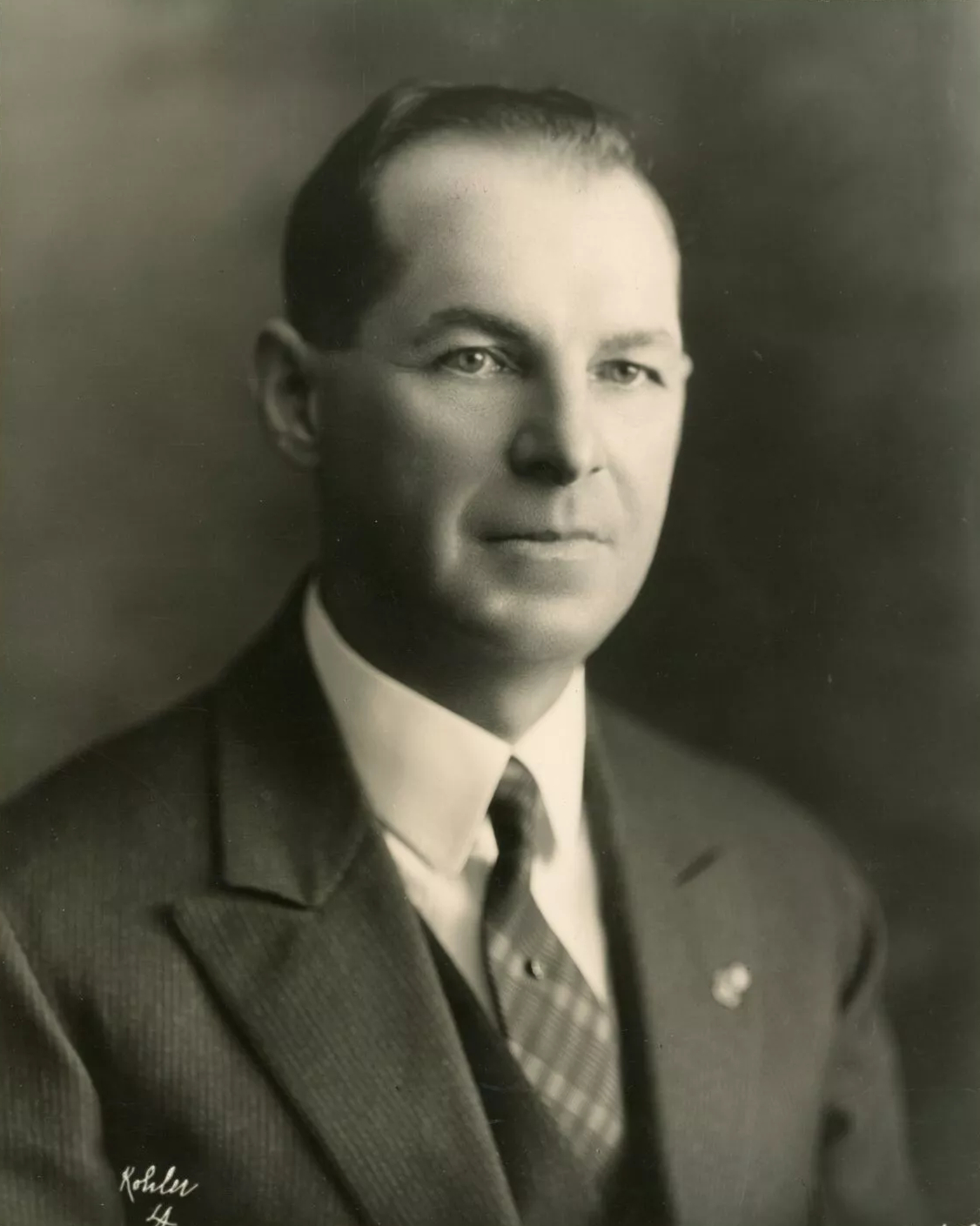
- Hoeppel in 1935

Member of the U.S. House of Representatives from California's 12th district
- In office March 4, 1933 – January 3, 1937
- Preceded by: District created
- Succeeded by: Jerry Voorhis

Personal details
- Born: John Henry Hoeppel; February 10, 1881 Tell City, Indiana, U.S.
- Died: September 21, 1976 (aged 95) Arcadia, California, U.S.
- Resting place: Resurrection Cemetery, San Gabriel, California
- Party: Democratic
- Other political affiliations: Prohibition (1946)

John Henry Hoeppel (February 10, 1881 – September 21, 1976) was an American World War I veteran who served as a U.S. representative from California. He served two terms, from 1933 through 1937, but was convicted for trying to profit from his appointment of a student to a military service academy.

== Early life ==
Born near Tell City, Indiana, Hoeppel attended grammar school in Evansville, Indiana but did not attend high school.

=== World War I ===
He enlisted in the United States Army on July 27, 1898, and served successively as private, corporal, and sergeant until 1921, with service in France during the First World War.

=== Early career ===
Hoeppel moved to Arcadia, California in 1919. He was the postmaster of Arcadia from 1923 to 1931. In 1928, he became editor of National Defense magazine.

== Political career ==
Hoeppel was elected as a Democrat to the Seventy-third and to the Seventy-fourth Congresses (March 4, 1933 – January 3, 1937). He served as chairman of the Committee on War Claims (Seventy-fourth Congress). In 1933 he was instrumental in persuading the U.S. Army to donate 183 acres of land from the Ross Field Army Balloon School to Los Angeles County to be developed into the Arcadia County Park.

He was accused in 1934 of conspiracy to sell an appointment to the U.S. Military Academy at West Point for $1,000. He was found guilty and sentenced to four to twelve months in prison.

His son Charles J. Hoeppel, who was seeking appointment to the U.S. Naval Academy as part of the deal, was also convicted. Their appeal in 1936 was unsuccessful.

Hoeppel was an unsuccessful candidate for renomination in 1936 to the Seventy-fifth Congress, afterwards resuming his editorial career. He was an unsuccessful Prohibition candidate for election in 1946 to the Eightieth Congress, losing to future U.S. President Richard Nixon.

== Death ==
Hoeppel died in Arcadia on September 21, 1976, and is buried in Resurrection Cemetery, San Gabriel, California.

== Electoral results ==
1932 United States House of Representatives elections
Party	Candidate	Votes	%
Democratic	John H. Hoeppel	43,122	45.8%
Republican	Frederick F. Houser	40,674	43.2%
Prohibition	Richard M. Cannon	10,308	11.0%
Total votes		94,104	100.0%
Turnout			
Democratic win (new seat)			

1934 United States House of Representatives elections
Party	Candidate	Votes	%
Democratic	John H. Hoeppel (Incumbent)	52,595	50.7%
Republican	Frederick F. Houser	51,216	49.3%
Total votes		103,811	100.0%
Turnout			
Democratic hold			

== See also ==
- List of American federal politicians convicted of crimes
- List of federal political scandals in the United States
- List of members of the American Legion

U.S. House of Representatives
New constituency	Member of the U.S. House of Representatives from California's 12th congressional district 1933–1937	Succeeded by Jerry Voorhis
