= South Pasadena Unified School District =

School district in California, United States

Address
- 1100 El Centro Street South Pasadena, California, 91030; United States

District information
- Type: Public
- Grades: K–12
- Superintendent: Dr. Angela Elizondo-Baxter
- NCES District ID: 0637500

Students and staff
- Students: 4,651 (2022–2023)
- Teachers: 192.14 (FTE)
- Staff: 411.79 (FTE)
- Student–teacher ratio: 24.21:1

Other information
- Website: www.spusd.net

South Pasadena Unified School District is the school district serving South Pasadena, California, United States. The South Pasadena Middle School was the site of a congressional debate in 1946 between Rep. Jerry Voorhis and then unknown Navy veteran Richard Nixon. Nixon won the debate according to most observers and upset Voorhis in the November election.

South Pasadena Unified School District's Board of Education members are elected by geographical district, composed of five members. Elections were held in November of odd-numbered years, but effective in November 2018, elections will be held in November of even-numbered years.

== Schools ==
=== Primary ===
- Marengo Elementary School

Marengo's mascot is the Lions.

- Monterey Hills Elementary School

Monterey Hills’ mascot is a Roadrunner.

- Arroyo Vista Elementary School

Arroyo Vista’s mascot is the Wildcats.

=== Secondary ===
- South Pasadena Middle School (Junior High)
- South Pasadena High School

== Governance ==
South Pasadena Unified School District is governed by a five-member Board of Education, which appoints a superintendent, who runs the daily operations of the district. Members of the board are elected by geographical district in even-numbered years to staggered four-year terms. The district's current superintendent is Dr. Geoff Yantz, who is retiring from the position on June 30, 2025 and his successor is Dr. Angela Elizondo-Baxter. The five current members of the Board of Education include Board President Dr. Michele Kipke, Karissa Adams, Patricia Martinez-Miller, Karen Tamis, and Zahir Robb.
