= Roger Morris (American writer) =

American historian

Roger Paul Morris (born January 15, 1938) is an American historian, foreign policy analyst, and journalist. He served on the staff of the U.S. National Security Council under the presidencies of both Lyndon Johnson and Richard Nixon. As an author he has won fellowships from the Guggenheim Foundation, the Society of American Historians and the National Endowment for the Humanities. On two occasions he has won the Investigative Reporters and Editors’ National Award for Distinguished Investigative Journalism.

== Biography ==
Roger Morris earned his doctorate in government from Harvard University. He entered government service in 1966 as a Junior Foreign Service Officer. After an assignment to Belgrade, he was chosen as a research assistant on a specific project to former United States Secretary of State Dean Acheson. He first joined the National Security Council staff under the administration of Democratic President Lyndon B. Johnson. When Republican Richard Nixon won the presidency in 1968, he appointed Henry Kissinger as his National Security Advisor, and Kissinger asked Morris to remain on the NSC staff as a senior staff member. However, Morris resigned in April 1970, when Nixon ordered the Cambodian Campaign.

Morris has served as a university lecturer, but is best known as a writer. His biography of Nixon, Richard Milhous Nixon: The Rise of an American Politician, was short-listed for the National Book Award. He served as a senior fellow of the Green Institute.

His major works include:

- Uncertain Greatness: Henry Kissinger and American Foreign Policy. 1978.
- The Devil's Butcher Shop: The New Mexico Prison Uprising, Franklin Watts, 1983.
- Haig: The General's Progress, Playboy Press, 1982, ISBN 0-87223-753-2. Covers the remarkable rise of Alexander Haig from boyhood to Secretary of State.
- Richard Milhous Nixon: The Rise of an American Politician, 1991.
- Partners in Power: The Clintons and Their America, Henry Holt, 1996, ISBN 0-89526-302-5. Detailed coverage of the rise of Bill Clinton and Hillary Clinton.
- The Money and the Power: the Making of Las Vegas (with Sally Denton).
- Shadow of the Eagle, Alfred Knopf, 2006.
- The Rise and Rise of Robert Gates: The Gates Inheritance.
- The Rise and Rise of Robert Gates: The World That Made Bob.
- The Rise and Rise of Robert Gates: The Specialist.
