= David Morris =

David Morris may refer to:

== Entertainment ==
- Dave Morris (actor) (1884–1955), American film actor of the silent era
- David Morris (actor) (1924–2007), English painter and actor
- Dave Morris (comedian) (1896–1960), English music hall comedian
- Hearty White, aka David Morris (born 1964), musician

== Politics ==
- David Morris (Whig politician) (1800–1864), Member of Parliament for Carmarthen, 1837–64
- David Morris (Wisconsin politician) (1849–1914), American farmer and politician
- David Morris (Labour politician) (1930–2007), Welsh politician and member of the European Parliament
- David Morris (Australian politician) (born 1955), Australian politician and member of the Victorian Legislative Assembly
- David Morris (Conservative politician) (born 1966), member of the UK House of Commons elected 2010

== Sports ==
- David Morris (English footballer) (1888–?), English footballer in the 1910s
- David Morris (Scottish footballer) (1897–1971), Raith Rovers FC and Scotland player
- David Morris (footballer, born 1957), Welsh professional footballer
- David Hyman Morris (1897–1985), English footballer
- David Morris (soccer) (born 1978), Canadian soccer defender
- David Morris (skier) (born 1984), Australian 2014 Olympic Aerial Skiing Silver Medallist
- David Morris (snooker player) (born 1988), Irish snooker player
- David Morris (runner), winner of the 1993 3000 meters at the NCAA Division I Indoor Track and Field Championships
- Dave Morris (sprinter) (born 1942), American sprinter, 1963 All-American for the USC Trojans track and field team
- David Morris (footballer, born 1971), English footballer, see List of AFC Bournemouth players (1–24 appearances)

== Other ==
- Dave Morris (game designer) (born 1957), British author of gamebooks, novels, comics, computer games
- David B. Morris, emeritus professor of literature at the University of Virginia
- David Morris (writer), American author and vice-president of the Institute for Local Self-Reliance
- David J. Morris (writer), American writer and former Marine infantry officer
- David M. Morris, American physiotherapist
- David Morris (jeweller), British jeweller
- David Morris (United States Army officer), American general
- David Morris (bishop) (born 1986), Welsh Anglican bishop
- David Morris, one of the two defendants in the McLibel case

== See also ==
- Dave Hennen Morris (1872–1944), American lawyer, diplomat and racehorse owner
- David Maurice (1626–1702), Welsh Anglican priest and translator
