= 1973 Temple City Rams football team =

College football season

1973 Temple City Rams football

CIF Southern Section 2-A champion
- Conference: Rio Hondo League
- Record: 12–1 ( Rio Hondo League)
- Head coach: Bob Hitchcock (14th season)
- Defensive coordinator: Don Swanson
- Home stadium: North Field

The 1973 Temple City Rams football team was an American football team that represented Temple City High School in the 1973 CIF Southern Section 2-A football season.

The Rams won 46 consecutive games from 1969 to 1973, setting the CIF Southern Section record for most consecutive wins. It also tied the California high school football state record originally set by St. Helena High School from 1960 to 1965. The streak was broken in a loss to Saint Francis High School on October 12, 1973, but Temple City still went on to win the Southern Section 2-A football championship for the fourth consecutive season. They beat North (Riverside) 21–13 in the 2-A championship game at Mt. San Antonio College's Hilmer Lodge Stadium.

The team returned 14 varsity lettermen from the 1972 team, and began training camp on August 27, 1973.

== Schedule ==
Date	Opponent	Site	Result	Source
September 21	San Gabriel	North Field; Temple City, CA	W 35–14	
September 28	Bonita	North Field; Temple City, CA	W 27–20	
October 5	Alhambra	Moor Field; Alhambra, CA	W 35–13	
October 12	Saint Francis	Unknown; La Cañada Flintridge, CA	L 0–10	
October 19	La Cañada	Unknown; La Cañada Flintridge, CA	W 28–0	
October 26	San Marino	Unknown; San Marino, CA	W 27–6	
November 3	Duarte	North Field; Temple City, CA	W 36–14	
November 9	Bell Gardens	North Field; Temple City, CA	W 47–17	
November 15	South Pasadena	North Field; Temple City, CA	W 9–0	
November 23	Baldwin Park	Unknown; Unknown (first round)	W 34–0	
November 30	Sonora	Unknown; Unknown (Quarterfinals)	W 14–0	
December 7	Rio Mesa	Hilmer Lodge Stadium; Walnut, CA (Semifinals)	W 21–6	
December 14	N. Riverside	Hilmer Lodge Stadium; Walnut, CA (Finals)	W 21–13	

== Postseason honors ==
Fullback Rick Brown was selected CIF Southern Section 2-A Player of the Year on December 26, 1973, by the Citizens Savings Athletic Foundation. Brown, end Rich Mueller, tackle Ron Blankenbaker, linebacker Jeff Edwards, and defensive lineman Ross Malinowski received first-team CIF Southern Section 2-A Division honors.
