= Temple City High School =

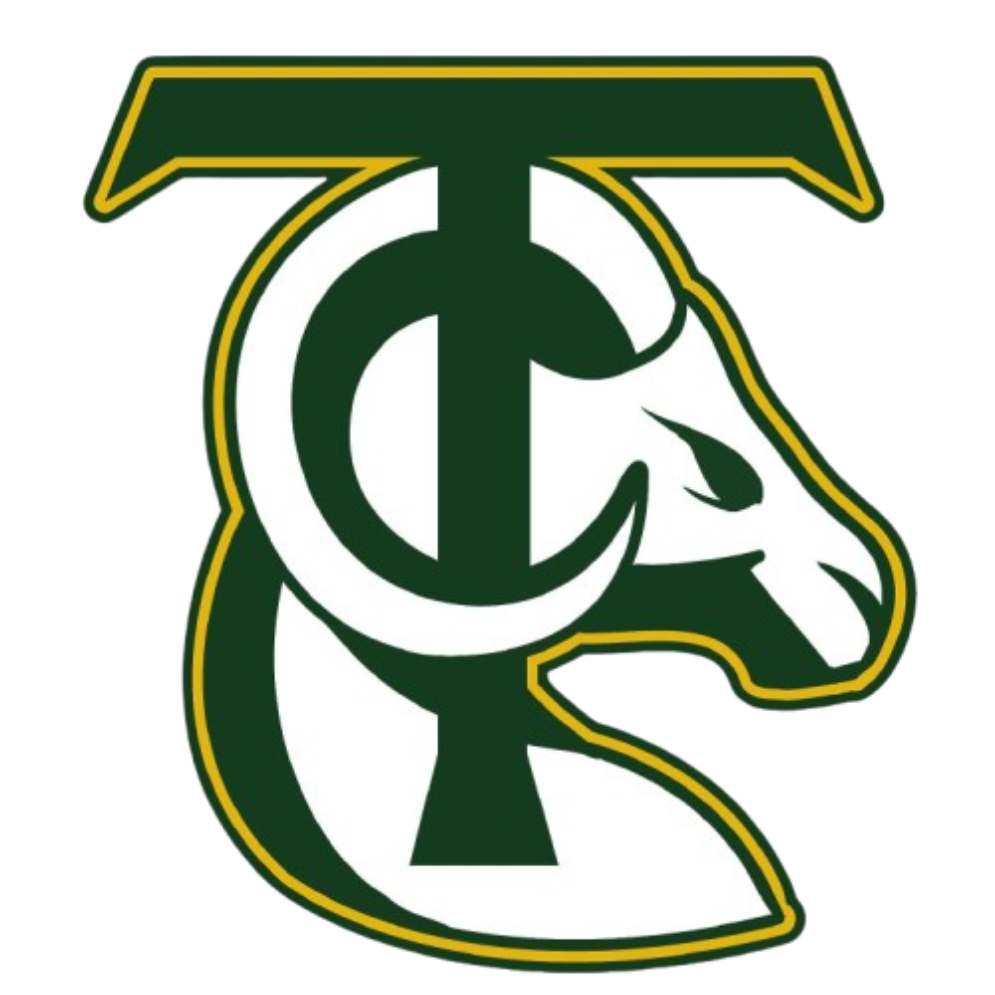

Location
- 9501 East Lemon Avenue; Temple City, California 91780; United States; 34.11884°N 118.065562°W

Information
- School type: Public high school
- Motto: Home of the Temple City Rams
- Established: 1954
- School district: Temple City Unified School District
- NCES District ID: 0638980
- School number: 19 65052 1938679
- Principal: Elena Li
- Faculty: 78.53 (FTE)
- Grades: 9–12
- Enrollment: 1,758 (2023-24)
- Student to teacher ratio: 22.39
- Campus type: Suburban
- Colors: Green and gold
- Athletics: Baseball, Basketball, cheerleading, cross country, football, golf, marching band, soccer, Softball, swimming, tennis, track and field, volleyball, water polo,
- Athletics conference: CIF Southern Section; Rio Hondo League
- Mascot: Rams
- Newspaper: TCHS Rampage
- Website: tcusd.net

Temple City High School (also known as TCHS) is a four-year comprehensive secondary school located in Temple City, California, in Los Angeles County. The high school was awarded the California Distinguished School award in 1996 and in 2019, and a California Gold Ribbon School award in 2017. Temple City High School was ranked #209 in the distinguished Newsweek list of America's Best High Schools.

== History ==
The Temple City Unified School District was established on July 1, 1954, and incorporated Oak Avenue Intermediate School, a junior high school formerly part of the Pasadena Unified School District. Before 1956, Temple City public school students would attend Pasadena High School after Oak Avenue, but in 1956 the first 12th grade class in the district graduated at Oak Avenue. The first graduation from Temple City High was a year later, when the Associated Student Body established the green and gold school colors and the Ram as the school mascot. Temple City High School holds its annual graduation ceremonies at the school's Hitchcock-North Stadium in the evening and the Grad Night celebration takes place after the ceremonies on campus instead of holding it at a Southern California theme park.

== Awards and recognition ==
Temple City High School has received several awards for its academic programs. Rampage, the school newspaper, was presented with the second place award for High School Newspaper Excellence in Division A by the Los Angeles Times at the Student Journalism Awards on May 26, 2005.

Temple City High has a vast number of science competition teams. Their Science Olympiad team has place many times throughout its history, notably placing 1st in 2026, 3rd in 2024 and 2023, and 2nd in 2022 and 2020 for regionals. Their Physics Bowl team in 2023 placed 1st nationally in all divisions and third internationally in all divisions.

== Temple City High School Yearbook: Templar ==
Over the years, Temple City's yearbook program has been both regionally and nationally recognized. The most prominent year was in 2007, where the Templar's 2005–06 edition yearbook, themed "It All Adds Up", received one of only six Columbia Scholastic Press Association "Gold Crown" awards in the nation. In 2009, the Templar received the "Herff Jones Yearbook Silver Crown" award for their 2007–08 edition yearbook entitled "Right Click". In 2009, at the East Los Angeles Journalism Education Association (ELAJEA) Write-Offs competition in Alhambra, the Templar also took home Grand Sweepstakes for accumulating the most points over a series of criteria that include Copywriting, Layout, and Pictures.

== Athletics ==
Temple City High School mascot

Temple City High School competes interscholastically as a member of the Rio Hondo League in baseball, softball, basketball, cross country, golf, marching band, soccer, swimming, tennis, track and field, volleyball, water polo, boys' football, girls' flag football, cheer, pep flags, song, color guard, and choreo.

In 1973, the football team set the California Interscholastic Federation (CIF) Southern Section record for most consecutive wins, with 46. It also tied the California high school football state record.

== Notable alumni ==
- Kent Kramer, class of 1962, professional football player; All-CIF pick in 1961 for the Rams
- Kent Cullers, class of 1967 valedictorian, the first totally blind physicist in the world and Director for NASA's Search for Extraterrestrial Intelligence R&D
- Reb Brown, class of 1966. Actor, Uncommon Valor, Yor, the Hunter from the Future, and Space Mutiny.
- Steve Busick, class of 1977, member of 1978 USC Trojans football team which earned UPI honors as national champion, also 7-year NFL career as a linebacker
- Steven W. Lindsey, class of 1978, is a United States Air Force Colonel and NASA astronaut
- Angela Morales, class of 1985, is a writer/essayist, author of The Girls in My Town, and winner of the PEN Diamonstein-Spielvogel Award for the Art of the Essay.
- Steve Jablonsky, class of 1988, composer and music director. Music Director for Desperate Housewives and Transformers movies
- Jimmy Conrad, class of 1994, made the U.S. roster for the 2006 FIFA World Cup, defender for the Kansas City Wizards
- Lee "Rocky" Biddle, class of 1994, former MLB relief pitcher for the Expos and White Sox.
- Rico Harris, class of 1995, former Harlem Globetrotter who disappeared in 2014
- Wesley Chan, class of 1996, American venture capitalist and the co-founder and managing partner of venture capital firm FPV. Known for founding Google Analytics and Google Voice, and for building Google's early advertising system.
- Joseph Meehan, class of 1997, professional wrestler
- Bryan Jordan, class of 2003, midfielder for the San Jose Earthquakes and formerly for the Los Angeles Galaxy
- Ryan Tucker, class of 2005, Major League Baseball pitcher for the Texas Rangers
- Sherry Cola, class of 2007, comedian and actress
- Alex "Xpecial" Chu, class of 2010, professional League of Legends player, former head coach for Harrisburg University
- Brandon Soo Hoo, class of 2013, actor

== See also ==
- List of high schools in Los Angeles County, California
