= General Morris =

General Morris may refer to:

- Basil Morris (1888–1975), Australian Army major general
- David Morris (United States Army officer) (fl. 1970s–2020s), U.S. Army major general
- Edmund Finucane Morris (1792–1871), British Army general
- Edwin Morris (British Army officer) (1889–1970), British Army general
- John Ignatius Morris (1842–1902), Royal Marines lieutenant general
- John W. Morris (1921–2013), U.S. Army lieutenant general
- Shaun Morris (fl. 1980s–2020s), U.S. Air Force lieutenant general
- Staats Long Morris (1728–1800), British Army general
- Thomas A. Morris (1811–1904), Indiana Militia brigadier general in service to the Union Army in the American Civil War
- William H. H. Morris Jr. (1890–1971), U.S. Army lieutenant general
- William H. Morris (1827–1900), Union Army brigadier general
- William W. Morris (1801–1865), Union Army brevet brigadier general

== See also ==
- Maurizio Moris (1860–1944), Italian Aeronautical Services lieutenant general
- Attorney General Morris (disambiguation)
