= TCUSD =

TCUSD may refer to:

- Temple City Unified School District
- Tuba City Unified School District
