= Butler & Wilson =

British jewellery brand

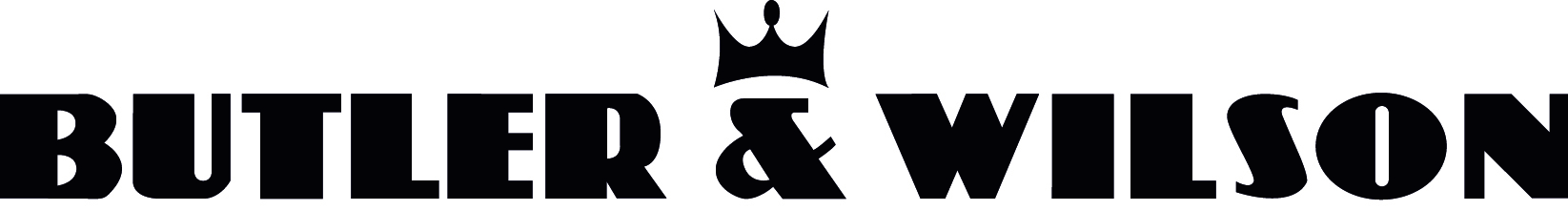
- Industry: Jewellery
- Founded: 1969; 57 years ago
- Founder: Nicky Butler and Simon Wilson
- Headquarters: London, United Kingdom
- Website: butlerandwilson.co.uk

Butler & Wilson is a British jewellery brand founded by Nicky Butler and Simon Wilson. The company is best-known for its crystal costume jewellery, and their pieces have been worn by celebrities and members of the Royal Family. Butler & Wilson, first started trading in 1969. Their collection has expanded over time and now includes clothing, accessories and fine jewellery.

== History ==
Butler & Wilson started in 1969 at Chelsea's Antiquarius Market. In 1972, the company moved to its flagship store on Fulham Road in London, then opened a further retail outlet on South Molton Street, London.

At the end of the 1970s, Butler & Wilson designed the Christmas Lights for Regent Street, and in the 1980s, they worked alongside Pirelli calendars and Giorgio Armani, whilst establishing a retail presence in Harrods and on Sunset Boulevard, Los Angeles.

In 1993, when Buckingham Palace first opened to the public, the company was invited to design a range of jewellery that took inspiration from the palace's interior.

QVC started selling Butler & Wilson's jewellery in 1995. The companies celebrated this twenty-five-year partnership in 2020.

In 2017, Butler & Wilson closed their South Molton store, which Simon Wilson referred to at the time as “depressing, sad”. He cited London's changing retail environment as the reason behind the decision.

== Reception ==
The company's jewellery has been worn by several notable celebrities over the years. Princess Diana was a frequent shopper at the Fulham Road store, and wore a pair of Butler & Wilson's crescent-moon-shaped earrings during a meeting with the Sultan of Oman. Other famous people that have worn the brand's jewellery in the past include Jerry Hall, Iman, Catherine Deneuve, Faye Dunaway and Elle Macpherson. More recently, Rihanna, Madonna and Rita Ora have worn Butler & Wilson jewellery, as has Catherine, Duchess of Cambridge.

== Products ==
Butler & Wilson have diversified their product range over the years and now sell both fine and fashion jewellery, as well as accessories and clothing. The brand is known for their individual and glamorous jewellery pieces.

In the early 2000's, the brand ventured into fine jewellery and started using semi-precious and precious stones in their designs such as ruby, opal and turquoise. In 2019, Butler & Wilson released a jewellery collection to celebrate their 50th anniversary which compiled their most well-known designs.

== Philanthropy ==
Butler & Wilson have donated the proceeds generated from some past events to various breast cancer charities. Simon Wilson has supported Breast Cancer as they have the biggest cancer hospital next to their store on Fulham Road.

The fundraising events included: the brand's 21st anniversary at Harrods, their 30th anniversary at The Natural History Museum, and their 40th anniversary at KOKO's Nightclub, London.

== See also ==
- Howell James & Co.
- David Morris (jeweller)
