= Bill Redell =

American football player and coach (born 1941)

Biographical details
- Born: April 17, 1941 (age 85); Red Bluff, California, U.S.

Playing career
- 1962–1963: Occidental
- 1964–1966: Edmonton Eskimos
- 1967–1968: Hamilton Tiger-Cats
- 1969: Calgary Stampeders
- Positions: Quarterback, cornerback, placekicker, punter

Coaching career (HC unless noted)
- 1982: Crespi Carmelite HS (CA)
- 1983–1984: Portland Breakers (TE)
- 1985–1991: Crespi Carmelite HS
- 1992–1999: St. Francis HS (CA)
- 2000–2011: Oaks Christian HS (CA)
- 2012: Occidental
- 2014: Oaks Christian HS (CA)

Head coaching record
- Overall: 2–7 (college)

Accomplishments and honors

Championships
- 8 CIF

Awards
- CFL All-Star (1966)
- College Football Hall of Fame; Inducted in 2001 (profile)

Bill Redell (born April 17, 1941) is an American former football coach and member of the College Football Hall of Fame. Born in Red Bluff, California, Redell played quarterback at San Marino High School in San Marino, California, earning a scholarship from the University of Southern California (USC), but later transferred to play at Occidental College, in 1962 and 1963. In his two years at Occidental he passed for 1,567 yards and rushed for 1,583. He passed for 11 touchdowns and rushed for eight. He completed 68 percent of pass attempts. He averaged 6.3 yards on each rushing attempt. He played cornerback on defense and had seven pass interceptions in his career. He did the team's punting and place kicking, making 36 of 43 extra-point attempts. He led Occidental to two championships in the Southern California Intercollegiate Athletic Conference and was named to the NAIA All-America team in 1963.

After college, Redell played six years in the Canadian Football League (CFL) for the Edmonton Eskimos, Hamilton Tiger-Cats, and Calgary Stampeders. In 1970, he became a football coach. His first jobs were as assistant on the collegiate level at California State University, Fullerton and California Lutheran University. Then he became a head coach at the high school level.

Redell served as head coach at Crespi Carmelite High School in Encino, California, where in 1986, he led the Celts to a 13–1 record and the CIF-SS Big Five Conference Championship, avenging their only regular season loss with a 49–14 victory over St.John Bosco High at Anaheim Stadium. Redell also coached at Oaks Christian High School in Westlake Village, California and developed them into one of California's better high school football programs. The Oaks Christian Lions finished sixth on the final USA Today prep football Super25 ranking of 2006.

Redell was also a chief executive officer of Bolton & Co. Insurance Brokers in South Pasadena, California. He is married and has three sons.

== Head coaching record ==
=== College ===
Year	Team	Overall	Conference	Standing	Bowl/playoffs
Occidental Tigers (Southern California Intercollegiate Athletic Conference) (2012)
2012	Occidental	2–7	2–5	6th	
Occidental:		2–7	2–5		
Total:		2–7			
