= Steve Busick =

American football player (born 1958)

No. 58, 52, 55
- Position: Linebacker

Personal information
- Born: December 10, 1958 (age 67); Los Angeles, California, U.S.
- Listed height: 6 ft 4 in (1.93 m)
- Listed weight: 227 lb (103 kg)

Career information
- High school: Temple City (Temple City, California)
- College: USC
- NFL draft: 1981: 7th round, 181st overall pick

Career history
- Denver Broncos (1981–1985); Los Angeles Rams (1986); San Diego Chargers (1987)

Awards and highlights
- National champion (1978)

Career NFL statistics
- Sacks: 3
- Interceptions: 2
- Fumble recoveries: 4
- Stats at Pro Football Reference

Steven Ray Busick (born December 10, 1958) is an American former professional football player who was a linebacker in the National Football League (NFL). He was selected by the Denver Broncos in the seventh round of the 1981 NFL draft, 181st overall. He graduated from Temple City High School in 1977, then played college football for the USC Trojans.

Busick also played for the Los Angeles Rams and San Diego Chargers.
