= Oak Avenue Intermediate School =

Location
- 6623 North Oak Avenue; Temple City, California; 34.11884°N 118.065562°W

Information
- Type: Public
- School district: Temple City Unified School District
- Principal
- Grades: 7–8
- Colors: Royal blue and gold
- Athletics: Flag Football, Basketball, Softball, Volleyball, Soccer
- Mascot: Royal Lion
- Website: oak.tcusd.net

Oak Avenue Intermediate School is a two-year public intermediate, junior high, or middle school, located in Temple City, California, in the west San Gabriel Valley.

== History ==
The Temple City Unified School District was established on July 14, 1954, and incorporated Avenue Intermediate School, formerly part of the Pasadena Unified School District. Before 1956, Temple City public school students would attend Pasadena High School after Oak Avenue, but in 1956 the first 12th grade class in the district graduated at Oak Avenue.

== Culture ==
Oak Avenue Intermediate School is known for its diverse student body, consisting of more than 60% Asian students.

== Distinguished School Award ==
The Temple City Unified School District is recognized as "A District of Distinguished Schools" as all the public schools have been awarded the Distinguished School Award by the California Department of Education, placing each awarded school in the top five percent of California's public schools in the given year.

Oak Avenue Intermediate School (grades 7–8) and Temple City High School (grades 9–12), received the award in 1996 just a year after Cloverly Elementary School (grades 4–6) was the first to receive the award, in 1995. One year later, in 1997, both Emperor Elementary School (grades K–6) and La Rosa Elementary School (grades K–3) received the award, followed by Longden Elementary School (grades K–6) in 2004.

== Differentiated staffing ==
Differentiated staffing has been successfully implemented at Oak Avenue to such an extent that it has been used as an example in Differentiated Staffing in Schools. A Review of Current Policies and Programs by Joseph Stocker (published by National School Public Relations Assn., 1201 16th Street, N.W. Washington, D.C. 20036).
