= Sonagna =

Sonagna or Sonanga is a former Tongva-Gabrieleño Native American settlement at or near what is now San Marino High School in Los Angeles County, California.

It was located recorded as being located at "Mr. White's farm" which referred to the ranch of Miguel Blanco who owned Rancho Muscupiabe. Of this location, H. D. Barrows commented:

Mr. White obtained a concession of five hundred veras (about 1370 ft) square, just north of the Mission, which contained inexhaustible springs of living water. On these 77 acres of one-time Mission land, which White later sold, he established a vineyard, an orchard, and an adobe home. The building still stands at the edge of the athletic field of San Marino High School, and anyone who goes there can visualize the setting of Sonangna, though it takes a feat of the imagination to erase from the scene the concrete boulevards, the clipped lawns and modern buildings, and substitute the natural pools and cienegas, the native grasses and shrubs, and the great oak groves which must have supported the Sonauitam in the best Gabrielino style.

It was recorded to be one of the principal villages in the area by Hugo Reid for the Los Angeles Star.

== See also ==
- Achooykomenga
- Kaawchama
- Genga
- Puvunga
- Yaanga
