= San Marino Unified School District =

School district in California, United States

Address
- 1665 West Drive San Marino, California, 91108; United States

District information
- Type: Public
- Grades: K–12
- Established: 1951
- Superintendent: Dr. Linda de la Torre
- NCES District ID: 0634860

Students and staff
- Students: 2,821
- Teachers: 137.27
- Staff: 126.1
- Student–teacher ratio: 20.55

Other information
- Website: www.smusd.us

San Marino Unified School District is a school district located in San Marino, California.

According to the California Department of Education, SMUSD outperforms the state average across most metrics.

In 2015, SMUSD was the highest performing school district in California.

== Schools ==
The district consists of two elementary schools (K.L. Carver Elementary School & Valentine Elementary School), one middle school (Henry E. Huntington Middle School) and one high school (San Marino High School).

== History ==
The first school opened in San Marino, California on September 9, 1917 at the 'Old Mayberry Home'. The small school had thirty-five students and three teachers, teaching from kindergarten to 8th grade. Until 1956, San Marino students attended South Pasadena High School, then called South Pasadena-San Marino High School.

In 1950, South Pasadena, California residents voted against allocating funds to expand South Pasadena-San Marino High School. This led to San Marino residents voting to secede from South Pasadena Unified School District to form SMUSD in 1951. South Pasadena residents subsequently approved the funding in 1954 but the decision to form SMUSD was already made.

== Board of education ==
San Marino Unified School District's Board of Education members are elected at-large and to a four-year term. The elections are plurality and are held on a Tuesday after the first Monday in November of even-numbers years effective with the 2018 election.
