= Rico Harris =

American basketball player who disappeared in 2014

- Born: May 19, 1977; Los Angeles, California, U.S.
- Disappeared: October 10, 2014 (aged 37); Yolo County, California, U.S.
- Status: Missing for 12 years, 1 month and 11 days
- Basketball career

Personal information
- Listed height: 6 ft 9 in (2.06 m)
- Listed weight: 300 lb (136 kg)

Career information
- High school: Temple City (Temple City, California)
- College: Los Angeles CC (1996–1998); Cal State Northridge (1998–1999)
- NBA draft: 1999: undrafted
- Playing career: 1999–2000
- Position: Power forward

Career history
- 2000: Harlem Globetrotters

Rico Omarr Harris (born May 19, 1977 – disappeared October 10, 2014) is an American former professional basketball player. A high school standout in his native Southern California, he later led Los Angeles City College (LACC) to its first state junior college title in 1997. After his college career, he played for some International Basketball League teams, and later with the Harlem Globetrotters.

The eldest of four children born to a former Idaho State star and his young wife, he had given up basketball before returning to it for his last two years at Temple City High School. He soon became a star player himself as well as a top college prospect, likened by those who saw him play to Lamar Odom. He had the opportunity to play for several NCAA Division I basketball programs, but never did due to a combination of academic and personal difficulties. He then chose to attend Cal-State Northridge despite interest from much higher-profile colleges and the NBA, a decision for which he was sharply criticized since it was seen as limiting his chances of reaching the NBA.

Harris ended his season at Northridge after being suspended twice for violations of team rules. He eventually made his way to the Globetrotters, but injuries from a 2000 assault forced him to quit after one month. After leaving basketball, the alcoholism that had begun to manifest itself during his college career intensified, and Harris became addicted to illegal drugs as well. He was arrested many times before he was able to recover from his addictions in 2007.

By October 2014, Harris had relocated to Seattle with a longtime girlfriend and had applied for a job there. He never arrived back there while returning from a trip to his mother's home in Alhambra to complete the move; he was last heard from when he left a message for his girlfriend. The call was traced to the Sacramento area, and his abandoned car was found in a Yolo County park several days later. There were some possible sightings up to a week afterwards, but none have been confirmed beyond a cell phone video the night of his disappearance, and extensive searches since have failed to find any trace of him in the area. His disappearance has been featured on an episode of the Investigation Discovery series Disappeared.

== Early life ==
Harris was the first born son of Henry Harris, a former star forward for Idaho State who, after his college years in the mid-1970s, was playing in a semiprofessional league in Los Angeles when he met 17 year old Margaret Fernandez. She eventually gave birth to Rico, the first of the couple's four children, in 1977. Afterwards they moved to Oregon, where Henry had been offered a job.

Most of the time Henry was a loving husband, but occasionally he became violent and abusive. The couple moved back to the Los Angeles area where they had three more children. Henry would often verbally and physically abuse his children, especially Rico. Despite that, Rico craved his father's affection and approval well into his adulthood.

Eventually Margaret left her husband, taking their children with her when she moved to Alhambra, the suburb where she'd grown up. Rico often held the family together while Margaret worked full-time. Although she later said she felt her oldest son was "born to play basketball", by the age of 15 he had given it up despite his size, and was considering becoming an actor. To that end, he and a friend attended Hollywood High School, a long trip from their homes.

After a year, Rico changed his mind about basketball and returned to the court. Despite the minimal contact he had had with his father since his parents' divorce, he used his father's Temple City address to enroll in high school there for his junior year.

== Basketball career ==
For most of his teens and 20s, Harris was praised for his NBA-level potential. The pinnacle of his playing career, however, would be the 1996–97 season, when he was the MVP of the state community college tournament and led his team to the state championship. He only played one season for a Division I team, however, and despite considerable interest from NBA teams, never signed with them.

=== High school ===
Rico, then 6 feet 8 inches (203 cm) and 215 pounds (98 kg), was an immediate sensation on the basketball court. His presence on the team transformed the previously undistinguished Temple City program into a contender, and drew college scouts. "Other teams would double- and triple-team him," recalled one of his coaches. "But you could just watch him for a couple plays and you could see the player he could be." Harris had been a fan of the 1980s Los Angeles Lakers teams, and in particular emulated Magic Johnson's style of play.

Off the court, Rico was initially shy and a poor student. However, after meeting a girlfriend whose academically inclined family helped him with his studying, he improved both socially and academically, achieving a 3.0 grade point average. On the court at that time, he became an even more dominant player, averaging 28 points and 15 rebounds a game during his senior season. The Long Beach Press-Telegram recognized him as one of the best high school players in the Western United States during the 1994–95 season, along with Chauncey Billups, Paul Pierce and Jason Terry, all of whom went on to long careers in the NBA.

Jim Harrick, who had just left the head-coaching position at UCLA to take over the University of Rhode Island program, had his eye on Harris, who he had recruited at his former position. He believed Rico could be part of a powerful team at Rhode Island, with Zach Marbury and Lamar Odom, who he was expecting to sign for the next season. However, Harris's newfound academic success did not extend to the Scholastic Aptitude Test (SAT), where he did not do well. UCLA had to withdraw its scholarship offer as a result.

=== College ===
Harris went to Arizona State under Proposition 48, which limited him to taking classes during his freshman year in order to regain his eligibility. Without his family and friends close by, he struggled academically and socially, as he originally had at Temple City. In March 1996 he was arrested on a charge of unlawful imprisonment along with two teammates after two women said the players had forced them to perform sex acts against their will. The charges were dropped after investigators uncovered inconsistencies in the women's stories, but the university asked Harris to sit out another year nonetheless.

==== Los Angeles City College ====
Instead, Harris returned to California and enrolled in Los Angeles City College (LACC), a two-year junior college, in the hope of improving his grades and playing for Harrick at Rhode Island. On the court, Cubs' coach Mike Miller let Harris play the game his way—shooting three-pointers, leading the fast break with no-look passes and faking out other big men under the basket as it suited him. "He could do it all," a teammate recalled in 2014. "He was Lamar Odom before Lamar Odom."

Harris was the team's biggest star, frequently regarded as the best player on the court from either team in every game he played. He averaged 16.5 points and 14 rebounds a game. NBA scouts began attending games, hoping that Harris might consider foregoing his college career entirely once he was old enough to do so.

LACC posted a 30–6 record that season. It culminated in the school's first-ever California Community College Athletic Association state title, secured with an upset win over San Jose City College. Harris was named the championship tournament's most valuable player.

A few weeks after that triumph, early in 1996, Harris signed his letter of intent to attend Rhode Island and play for Harrick there. However, he stopped attending a psychology class he needed to pass midway through the semester, and failed it as a result, leaving him still ineligible under National Collegiate Athletic Association (NCAA) rules to transfer to a four-year college and play there. At the time there was speculation that he had deliberately failed the class to avoid having to relocate to the East Coast, far away from his hometown.

That speculation notwithstanding, Harris made his first-ever trip east of Chicago later that year to visit UConn, where an assistant coach who had seen him play likened him to Donyell Marshall, a former Huskies' star who had left school early for an NBA career. He told the Hartford Courant that he had learned from his Arizona State experience. "This time around, I know exactly what I want," he said. In addition to a Division I program, he was still considering declaring for the NBA draft or playing in a professional league overseas. "I'm in no rush."

Harris ultimately returned to LACC for his second season, which he would later say was a mistake. He became less focused, partying heavily with his brother in the apartment they shared near campus, and drinking beer during the day to take the edge off his hangovers. It did not affect his game, however. A teammate recalls Harris showing up for a game once wearing heavy sunglasses to mask the effects of the alcohol. "He probably didn't get no sleep and [was] up all night—then dropped like 35 [points] that game".

The team did not repeat as state champions, and Harris was later described as "a disruptive influence" during that season. Miller at one point suspended him for six games; Harris in turn faulted him for not controlling the team adequately. As the only returning player on that team, he explained, many of his teammates would not give him the ball. "I have no excuses," he told the Los Angeles Times. "I was playing against my own teammates and coaching staff."

Harris's drinking increased as the season wore on, leading to social isolation and costing him his relationship with the girlfriend who he had benefited from in high school. Recruiters from other four-year college programs continued to call and write, but Harris did not respond, believing many of them to be interested in him only for his athletic ability and not his personal development. Instead he declared himself for the 1998 NBA draft.

NBA scouts still saw lots of potential in Harris, and invited him to a pre-draft camp in Chicago for the most highly regarded prospects. But as he had the year before, he would not take the opportunity. Shortly before the camp, he not only decided he would not attend but withdrew from the draft, believing that he was not ready for the challenge on a personal level.

==== Cal State Northridge ====
The opportunity to play for Harrick at Rhode Island was still available to Harris, and many friends and observers believed he would take it. In September 1998, he called Bobby Braswell, then the head coach at Cal State Northridge, whom Harris had come to know three years earlier when Braswell had recruited him while an assistant at Oregon. Braswell later recalled that he thought Harris was calling for guidance.

Braswell congratulated Harris on signing with Harrick at Rhode Island. "That's not happening", Harris told him. He did not want to move that far away, and believed LACC coach Miller was trying to get him to go there strictly out of his friendship with Harrick and not out of any consideration for Harris's best interests. Instead, he asked if he could he play for Braswell, whom he trusted, at Northridge, closer to his family, where he could transfer his credits from Arizona State and LACC to become eligible immediately.

Since another local high school player that Northridge had offered a scholarship to had lost it after purposely failing a class, there was space for Harris at the small state school, which had not posted a winning record the seven seasons it had been in Division I. Braswell immediately told Harris the opening was his. Harris believed Braswell's reputation for strict discipline was what he needed most to develop as a person and a player.

With a player of Harris's level, talent rarely seen at a smaller school like Northridge, Braswell hoped he could realize his goals of a winning season, a Big Sky Conference title and a berth in the NCAA tournament. But while there was plenty of potential for Braswell in the relationship, observers saw less for Harris. Miller told him he was severely compromising his chances of signing with an NBA team by playing for such a small school in a less competitive conference, and others who knew him wondered if instead of leading the Matadors to new heights as he had in his first season at LACC, he would instead pose a threat to team unity again.

Braswell was optimistic. "Rico wants to make the best of this opportunity," he said to the Times. But early in the season it seemed as if the doubters had been correct. Harris had attempted to reconcile with his father in the offseason but had been rebuffed. He continued drinking heavily and could no longer fully contain his underlying emotional difficulties; early in the season Braswell suspended him briefly after he argued with other teammates and coaches. A hip pointer also sidelined him for five games.

He still performed well, averaging 10 points a game and leading the team in rebounds, but the NBA scouts who had been following his career could see that his performance was off from his previous heights, and took him off their lists of prospects. Near the end of the season Braswell suspended Harris again; the player did not attend a meeting with his coach in Braswell's office to mark his reinstatement. Harris would never play college basketball again, and left Northridge shortly after the season's end.

=== Post-college ===
Harris could not play for any other college as his eligibility had expired. He still had not given up on possibly making the NBA, and like his father before him took up semi-professional basketball. He played for short periods of time with the International Basketball League's San Diego Stingrays and St. Louis Storm. Rapper Master P, a former NBA player who had played briefly with the former team, put together a traveling team for which Harris played a few games. During this time, he drank less and worked on his jump shot, hoping the NBA had not completely lost interest in him.

In spring 2000, Harris opted instead to join the Harlem Globetrotters. His skills were ideal for the Globetrotters' shows, and he seemed to have found his niche. However, a month after he joined the team he was out driving with a girlfriend in South Los Angeles when he got into a dispute with some people there. After he left the car to confront them, someone hit him on the back of the head with a baseball bat.

Harris was able to leave the scene and drove off. But soon he started having intense headaches and had trouble keeping his balance. These aftereffects of the head injury persisted, and he had to leave the Globetrotters. At the age of 24, his basketball career was over.

== Addiction and recovery ==
Harris returned to his mother's house in Alhambra. He had no job prospects, and no plans for what he might do besides play basketball. Soon he returned to drinking. His mother continued to take care of him as well as his younger siblings, all of whom were likewise battling substance use disorders to some degree. She hoped Rico would, in her words "snap out of it", but his addiction instead broadened to include heroin, methamphetamine and crack.

"He would sniff Ajax just to feel the burn", a friend, David Lara, recalled. Throughout the 2000s, Harris experienced many relapses. He was arrested over a hundred times, most commonly for public intoxication. After a few days in jail, he often resumed drinking. To support his habits, he would sometimes beg in the street. "It was despair, bro. It was down there. It was the darkest of the dark," says Lara of the sight.

Efforts to persuade Harris to end his self-destructive path failed. Only in 2007, shortly after he turned 30, did he finally start to change. After an overdose of prescription medicine he had tried, Harris entered a rehabilitation facility operated by the Salvation Army in downtown Los Angeles.

The program took a long time for Harris to complete, but when he did, he seemed to have recovered. He moved in with Wilfredo Mayorga, another graduate of the program, and got a job working security detail in nearby Bell. At a party he met Jennifer Song, a visitor from Seattle who worked as an insurance broker. The two soon became romantically involved, and starting in 2012 they began spending long weekends in the other's city.

By September 2014 they had begun to talk about getting married, even going so far as to discuss possible names for children. Harris and Mayorga clashed over the relationship; their friendship ended when Harris abruptly moved out of the apartment and left Mayorga with all the unpaid bills. Shortly afterwards, Harris moved in with Song in Seattle, intending to relocate there permanently.

== Disappearance ==
Converting their long-distance relationship to a live-in one caused some friction between Song and Harris as the two began merging their lives. Harris nevertheless continued with his plans to move on with his life in a new city. He exchanged his California driver's license for a Washington-issued one. He was able to arrange a job interview for a position as a property appraiser, a job that would have meant much to him as it would have been the first time he held a skilled position unrelated to his athletic ability.

Before that, however, he decided he needed to return to Alhambra and visit his mother and brother one more time. Song believes his intent was to talk with them and reach some closure for the difficult events of his childhood. "I think he realized some things and he wanted to talk to [his mother]," she later told a reporter. "He wanted her to trust him and trust us and believe in our relationship."

Lara spoke with him by phone during his drive to Southern California. He says Rico was upbeat, hoping to marry Song and start a family with her. "He seemed to have his head together," he recalls.

However, his visit with his family, on October 9, was brief. He took one of his brothers out to eat and gave him a new cell phone as a gift, then returned to his mother's home to speak with her alone privately. Fernandez does not believe her son got what he was hoping for out of the conversation. Shortly after midnight, he decided to return, taking with him a few more personal belongings. His job interview was scheduled for the next day in Seattle.

Leaving Alhambra, he drove north on Interstate 5. Records show that he stopped in Lodi, 40 miles (64 km) south of Sacramento, to get gas. At 10:45 a.m. on October 10, he called Song from north of Sacramento and left a message saying that he was going "up into the mountains to rest", since he had not slept much since leaving Seattle. At 11:15 he turned the phone off. No one has heard from Harris or positively identified him since then.

=== Investigation ===
Song called Fernandez when Harris failed to return to Seattle when expected. Recalling that he had once disappeared for a few hours to San Diego, they decided to wait and see if he would return on his own. By October 14, several days after he had missed the job interview, they realized he was not going to do so, or that something had gone wrong, and reported him missing to the Alhambra police.

Locations
1 Lower Site rest area, Cache Creek Canyon, Yolo county - Harris' car found parked abandoned on October 14.
2 October 11: Sightings by passing drivers of man fitting Harris' description alone.
3 Size 18 footprints.
4 October 18: Backpack found, Redwood Valley.

That afternoon, a Yolo County deputy sheriff patrolling along a stretch of California State Route 16 along Cache Creek north of Rumsey saw a black Nissan Maxima sedan in a county park's lot for the second straight day. He looked inside and saw CDs, credit cards, and various papers scattered around. The car had not been reported stolen, so his superiors contacted the Alhambra police when they found out who it was registered to, and officers there informed Fernandez that it had been found, but not her son.

[H]ow does this guy not pop up somewhere? I mean, big guy has to eat three or four times a day ... I can see how a lot of people who don't stand out can disappear, but this guy stands out.

— Dean Nyland, Yolo County sheriff's detective

A search of the surrounding terrain of Cache Creek Canyon began shortly afterward. Search and rescue teams began looking over the lightly forested terrain surrounding the stream. They were assisted by teams on all-terrain vehicles and helicopters. An airplane with a thermographic camera flew over the area, and search dogs were brought in as well. The area within a five-mile (8.0 km) radius of the parking lot was covered, as well as the 27 miles (43 km) of Route 16 through the canyon.

But after three days, the searchers had found nothing. Many were incredulous. Rico at that time had reached his full adult height of 6 feet 9 inches (206 cm), and weighed 300 pounds (140 kg), reflecting the less active years since the end of his basketball career. They could not imagine how such a large person could have disappeared so completely.

When Harris's description was circulated in the area, a few sightings subsequent to October 10 were reported. One passerby along Route 16 reported seeing a man who fit his description walking along the road at 5:30 on October 11, while another motorist believed he had seen him sitting on a guardrail overlooking the creek near the parking lot.

Harris's car was towed away and searched. It was out of gas and the battery was nearly dead. Investigators found Harris's wallet and all of his credit cards save one, a Discover Card on which no charges have been made since Harris vanished. He had also taken his phone and driver's license. Detectives also found two plastic bottles, one mostly full of some type of hard liquor and the other empty but smelling strongly of the same beverage.

On October 18, eight days after Harris's last voicemail message, another sighting was reported. A man who had driven past the parking lot where the Nissan had been told police he saw a large man wearing light-colored pants, similar to those Harris had been wearing when he left his mother's house, early that morning. The next day, a trail of fresh foot impressions, left by size 18 sneakers consistent with those Harris wore, were found leading from the parking lot to the creek near where the Nissan had been parked.

Investigators were also able to find Harris's backpack, left by the side of the road about 1,500 feet (460 m) from the guardrail he was reported to have been sitting on the morning after his last phone call. In it they found his phone and charger and some other items not considered relevant to Harris's whereabouts. The phone contained pictures of the creek and some selfies, including one in which Harris was standing in front of a sign welcoming drivers to Yolo County striking a playful pose. There were also some videos, apparently taken unintentionally, showing Harris singing along to music playing in his car and casually flinging CDs around the passenger compartment. They were timestamped the night of October 10, demonstrating that Harris had been alive and in his car at that time.

On October 22, the sheriff's office announced it was scaling back the search. Divers were called in to search the nearby sections of the creek in mid-November, but found nothing. The investigation is continuing. In 2016 the Investigation Discovery channel series Disappeared devoted a segment to the case.

=== Theories ===
Dean Nyland, the detective working the case for the sheriff's office, has ruled out the possibility of foul play in Harris's disappearance. The photos and video on Harris's phone suggest he came to Yolo County voluntarily and alone; no evidence of any kind of struggle was found in or near the car. His backpack and phone also do not show any signs that they were taken forcibly; Nyland believes Harris may have left them where they were found himself, either accidentally or purposely, to avoid being tracked via the phone.

Nyland believes Harris may have made a wrong turn after getting gas and followed the road up into the hills of Yolo County. Seeing the parking lot, he may have decided to take a nap before driving further. When Harris woke up later that day, Nyland believes, the unresolved issues from his past came into play and he may have decided not to continue to Seattle just yet. "To him, this must have seemed like heaven", he said, showing a reporter the spot on the guardrail overlooking the creek where one driver reported seeing Harris the next morning. In the accidental videos on the phone, he adds, Harris seemed like "a free man".

After wandering the area for a few days, including those in which he had been sought, he returned to his car and found it gone, Nyland believes. At that point he either walked away into the woods or towards another town. "We have no sightings, so he probably got a ride", the detective says.

== See also ==
- List of people who disappeared mysteriously: post-1970
