= David Bromwich =

American scholar and academic

- Occupations: Academic, literary critic, literary historian

Academic background
- Education: Yale University (B.A., PhD)

Academic work
- Institutions: Princeton University; Yale University
- Main interests: Romanticism, eighteenth-century, philosophy

David Bromwich is Sterling Professor of English at Yale University.

== Career ==
After graduating from Yale with a B.A. in 1973 and a Ph.D. four years later, Bromwich became an instructor at Princeton University, where he was promoted to Mellon Professor of English before returning to Yale in 1988. In 1995 he was appointed Housum Professor of English at Yale. In 2006 he became a Sterling Professor.

Bromwich is a fellow of the American Academy of Arts and Sciences. He has published widely on Romantic criticism and poetry, and on eighteenth-century politics and moral philosophy. His book Politics by Other Means concerns the role of critical thinking and tradition in higher education, and defends the practice of liberal education against political encroachments from both Left and Right. In 2000 he edited a collection of writings by Edmund Burke, On Empire, Liberty, and Reform: Speeches and Writings which departs from other collections of Burke's writings by foregrounding Burke's impeachment of Warren Hastings and his criticisms of the British empire in India. His essays and reviews have appeared in The New Republic, The New York Review of Books, the London Review of Books, The Times Literary Supplement, and many other U.S. and British journals. He is a frequent contributor of political blog posts on the Huffington Post. Since 2017, he has served as a trustee of the National Humanities Center in Research Triangle Park, NC.

Bromwich's collection of essays Skeptical Music was awarded the PEN/Diamonstein-Spielvogel Award for the Art of the Essay in 2002.

== Political views ==
Bromwich argued against American intervention in the Syrian conflict.

He was a frequent critic of the Obama administration's caution and failure to achieve more of the Democratic party's policy agenda. He criticized the 2011 State of the Union Address for a lack of focus on gun control and immigration and for rhetorical concessions to conservative ideology. In 2014, he criticized the "disengagement" of the administration, saying that President Barack Obama "watches the world as its most important spectator." In July 2020, Bromwich was one of the 153 signers of the "Harper's Letter" (also known as "A Letter on Justice and Open Debate") that expressed concern that "the free exchange of information and ideas, the lifeblood of a liberal society, is daily becoming more constricted." He has spoken about the question of intellectual diversity in academia.

More recently, Bromwich has criticized the American stance on Ukraine for protracting the war with Russia and avoiding diplomacy.

== Bibliography ==
- Writing Politics: An Anthology (New York: NYRB Classics, 2020)
- American Breakdown: The Trump Years and How They Befell Us (London: Verso Books, 2019)
- How Words Make Things Happen (Oxford: Oxford University Press, 2019)
- The Intellectual Life of Edmund Burke: From the Sublime and Beautiful to American Independence (Cambridge, MA: Belknap Press, 2014).
- Moral Imagination: Essays (Princeton, NJ: Princeton University Press, 2014).
- Literary Genius: 25 Classic Writers Who Define English & American Literature (Philadelphia, PA: Paul Dry Books, 2007). Essayist. (Illustrated by Barry Moser) ISBN 978-1589880351
- American Sonnets: An Anthology (New York, NY: Library of America, 2007). Editor.
- On Liberty (New Haven, CT: Yale University Press, 2003). By John Stuart Mill. New edition with a biographical essay by David Bromwich, an interpretative essay by George Kateb, and commentaries by various authors.
- Skeptical Music: Essays on Modern Poetry (Chicago, IL: University of Chicago Press, 2001).
- On Empire, Liberty, and Reform: Speeches and Letters of Edmund Burke (New Haven, CT: Yale University Press, 2000). Editor.
- Hazlitt: The Mind of a Critic (Oxford: Oxford University Press, 1983; 2nd ed. 1999).
- Disowned by Memory: Wordsworth's Poetry of the 1790s (Chicago, IL: University of Chicago Press, 1998).
- Politics by Other Means: Higher Education and Group Thinking (New Haven, CT: Yale University Press, 1992).
- A Choice of Inheritance: Self and Community from Edmund Burke to Robert Frost (Cambridge, MA: Harvard University Press, 1989).
- Romantic Critical Essays (Cambridge English Prose Texts) (Cambridge: Cambridge University Press, 1988). Editor.
