= David Morris (footballer, born 1957) =

Welsh footballer

Personal information
- Full name: David Morris
- Date of birth: 20 September 1957 (age 69)
- Place of birth: Swansea, Wales
- Height: 5 ft 5 in (1.65 m)
- Position: Striker

Youth career
- –1974: Manchester United

Senior career*
Years	Team	Apps	(Gls)
1974–1977	Manchester United	0	(0)
1977	→ York City (loan)	7	(0)
Total		7	(0)
- * Club domestic league appearances and goals

David Morris (born 20 September 1957) is a Welsh former professional footballer who played as a striker in the Football League for York City, and was on the books of Manchester United without making a league appearance.
