= David Morris (writer) =

American author

David Morris is an American author. He is a founder and distinguished fellow of the Institute for Local Self-Reliance (ILSR).

== Institute for Local Self-Reliance ==
In 1974, David Morris joined with two other urban innovators, waste management specialist Neil Seldman and urban agriculture activist Gil Friend to found the Institute for Local Self-Reliance Located in the Adams Morgan neighborhood of D.C. The founders’ experiments included growing sprouts and worms in the basement and tomatoes in the rooftop greenhouse, installing the neighborhood's, and perhaps the city's, first solar hot water system and compost toilet.

Morris's additional experience with earlier neighborhood innovators provided the background for Neighborhood Power: The New Localism, Dr. Morris's 1975 book, written with Karl Hess.

ILSR became a resource for local, state and national efforts in alternative energy waste management, agriculture and other areas that demonstrated the ability of localities to capture their local wealth for local production and consumption

== Publications ==
=== Books ===
- 1973, We Must Make Haste Slowly: The Process of Revolution in Chile, Random House/Vintage Books
- 1975, Neighborhood Power: The New Localism (with Karl Hess), Beacon Press
- 1982, Self-Reliant Cities, Sierra Club Books
- 1983, Be Your Own Power Company, Rodale, Inc.
- 1992 The Carbohydrate Economy: Making Chemicals and Industrial Materials from Plant Matter, ILSR
- 1994, The Mondragon Cooperative Corporation, ILSR
- 2001, Seeing the Light, Regaining Control of our Electrical System, ILSR Press

=== Articles (selected) ===
- 1979, "Entrepreneurial Cities", Western City Magazine, October 1979
- 1981, "Humanly Scaled Energy", Fire of Life: The Smithsonian Book of the Sun, Smithsonian
- 1988, "Healthy cities: self-reliant cities", Health Promotion, Oxford University Press
- 1990, "Rootlessness undermines our economy as well as the quality of our lives", Utne Reader, May/June 1990
- 1991, "Economic Shell Game", MinnPost, June 1991
- 1992, "Save the Public Library", Media Culture Review, January 1992
- 1994, "Communities: Building Authority, Responsibility and Capacity", State of the Union, Westview Press

=== Reports (selected) ===
- 1975, “The Dawning of Solar Cells”, ILSR Press
- 1979, "Decentralized Photovoltaics", (with John Furber), The Congressional Office of Technology Assessment
- 1980, “Planning for Energy Self-Reliance, a case study for the District of Columbia", ILSR Press
- 1994, "The Carbohydrate Economy: Making Chemicals and Industrial Materials from Plant Matter" (with Irshad Ahmed)
- 1994, "Replacing Biochemicals for Petrochemicals: A Pollution Prevention Strategy for the Great Lakes Region" (with Irshad Ahmed)
- 1995, "Restructuring Minnesota's Tax System: Taxing Pollution Rather than Work and Investment"
- 1991, "Getting the Most From Our Materials: Making New Jersey State of the Art", (with Brenda Platt. et al.)
