= Temple City Unified School District =

School district in California

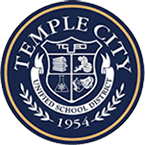

Address
- 9700 E Las Tunas Dr, Temple City, California, 91780; United States

District information
- Established: 1954; 71 years ago

Other information
- Elementary School K–6: Cloverly Elementary School, Emperor Elementary School, La Rosa Elementary School, Longden Elementary School
- High School 9–12: Temple City High School
- Alternative School: Dr. Doug Sears Learning Center / Temple City Alternative School
- Website: www.tcusd.net

Temple City Unified School District is the governing public school system of Temple City, California, in the West San Gabriel Valley. Encompassing approximately four square miles, the District includes within its boundaries most of the incorporated city of Temple City, small areas of Arcadia and San Gabriel, and some unincorporated areas of Los Angeles County. Nine schools fall under this area: Temple City High School - a comprehensive high school (grades 9–12), one alternative high school (grades 10–12), one alternative junior academy (grades 7–9), one intermediate school, four elementary schools, and an adult education school.

== Introduction ==
Established as a unified school district on July 1, 1954, the population of the District's service area is approximately 35,000, and the District employs approximately 390 full-time personnel and about 350 part-time staff. The District's activities and programs are regulated by The California Education Code and both State and Federal laws. Some programs are mandated, while others are permissive.

== Board of education ==
The Temple City Unified School District Board of Education members are elected at large, composed of five members, elected to a four-year term. The elections were held on a first Tuesday after the first Monday in November of odd-numbered years. Starting in 2018, the elections will now be held on a first Tuesday after the first Monday in November of even-numbered years to coincide with the Los Angeles County, California and federal general elections.

== Distinguished School Award ==
The district is recognized as "A District of Distinguished Schools" as all the public schools have been awarded the Distinguished School Award by the California Department of Education, placing each awarded school in the top five percent of California's public schools in the given year.

Cloverly Elementary School (grades 4–6) was the first to receive the award, in 1995. The District's intermediate school, Oak Avenue Intermediate School (grades 7–8), and comprehensive high school, Temple City High School (grades 9–12), received the award in 1996. One year later, in 1997, both Emperor Elementary School (grades K–6) and La Rosa Elementary School (grades K–3) received the award, followed by Longden Elementary School (grades K–6) in 2004.

== Schools ==
- Emperor Elementary School
- Oak Avenue Intermediate School
- Temple City High School
- Longden Elementary School
- Cloverly Elementary School
- La Rosa Elementary School
