= Rio Hondo League =

High school athletic league in California

The Rio Hondo League is a high school athletic league that is part of the CIF Southern Section. Members are located in the Pasadena area in the western San Gabriel Valley region of Los Angeles County. The league was created in 1962.

== Members ==
- Blair International Baccalaureate School (1982–present) except for football
- La Cañada High School (1962–present)
- Monrovia High School (1982–present)
- San Marino High School (1962–present)
- South Pasadena High School (1962–present)
- Temple City High School (1962–present)
