= PEN/Diamonstein-Spielvogel Award for the Art of the Essay =

American award for essay collections

- Description: Literary award presented for an outstanding book of original collected essays
- Country: United States
- Presented by: PEN America

The PEN/Diamonstein-Spielvogel Award for the Art of the Essay is awarded by the PEN America (formerly PEN American Center) to an author for a book of original collected essays.

== History and purpose ==
The award was founded by PEN Member and author Barbaralee Diamonstein and Carl Spielvogel, former New York Times columnist, "to preserve the dignity and esteem that the essay form imparts to literature." The winner receives a cash award of $10,000.

The award was on hiatus from 2005 to 2010.

The award is one of many PEN awards sponsored by International PEN affiliates in over 145 PEN centres around the world. The PEN American Center awards have been characterized as being among the "major" American literary prizes.

== Award winners ==
PEN/Diamonstein-Spielvogel Award for the Art of the Essay winners
Year	Author	Title	Result	Ref.
1990	Bernard Knox	Essays Ancient and Modern	Winner	
1991	Martha Nussbaum	Love's Knowledge	Winner	
1992	David Morris	The Culture of Pain	Winner	
1993	Frederick Crews	The Critics Bear It Away: American Fiction and the Academy	Winner	
1994	Stanley Fish	There's No Such Thing as Free Speech, and it's a Good Thing, Too	Winner	
1995	John Brinckerhoff Jackson	A Sense of Place, A Sense of Time	Winner	
1996	Thomas Nagel	Other Minds	Winner	
1997	Cynthia Ozick	Fame and Folly	Winner	
1998	Adam Hochschild	Finding the Trapdoor	Winner	
1999	Marilynne Robinson	The Death of Adam	Winner	
2000	Annie Dillard	For the Time Being	Winner	
2001	David Quammen	The Boilerplate Rhino	Winner	
2002	David Bromwich	Skeptical Music	Winner	
2003	William H. Gass	Test of Time	Winner	
2004	Stewart Justman	Seeds of Mortality	Winner	
2011	Mark Slouka	Essays from the Nick of Time	Winner	
2012	Christopher Hitchens	Arguably	Winner	
2013	Robert Hass	What Light Can Do	Winner	
2013	Jill Lepore	The Story of America	Shortlist	
2013	Daniel Mendelsohn	Waiting for the Barbarians	Shortlist	
2014	James Wolcott	Critical Mass	Winner	
2014	Rebecca Solnit	The Faraway Nearby	Shortlist	
2014	David Sedaris	Let's Explore Diabetes With Owls	Shortlist	
2014	Janet Malcolm	Forty-One False Starts	Shortlist	
2015	Ian Buruma	Theater of Cruelty: Art, Film, and the Shadow of War	Winner	
2015	David Bromwich	Moral Imagination	Shortlist	
2015	Charles D’Ambrosio	Loitering	Shortlist	
2015	Leslie Jamison	The Empathy Exams	Shortlist	
2015	Angela Pelster	Limber	Shortlist	
2016	Ta-Nehisi Coates	Between the World and Me	Winner	
2016	Renata Adler	After the Tall Timber: Collected Non-Fiction	Shortlist	
2016	Susan Howe	The Quarry	Shortlist	
2016	Marilynne Robinson	The Givenness of Things: Essays	Shortlist	
2016	David L. Ulin	Sidewalking: Coming to Terms with Los Angeles	Shortlist	
2017	Angela Morales	The Girls In My Town: Essays	Winner	
2018	Ursula K. Le Guin	No Time to Spare: Thinking About What Matters	Winner	
2019	Michelle Tea	Against Memoir	Winner	
2020	Deborah Fleming	Resurrection of the Wild	Winner	
2020	Eve Babitz	I Used to Be Charming: The Rest of Eve Babitz	Shortlist	
2020	Leslie Jamison	Make It Scream, Make It Burn: Essays	Shortlist	
2020	Emily Nussbaum	I Like To Watch: Arguing My Way Through the TV Revolution	Shortlist	
2020	Jia Tolentino	Trick Mirror: Reflections on Self-Delusion	Shortlist	
2021	Barbara Ehrenreich	Had I Known: Collected Essays	Winner	
2022	Margaret Renkl	Graceland, at Last: Notes on Hope and Heartache from the American South	Winner	
2022	Hanif Abdurraqib	A Little Devil in America: Notes in Praise of Black Performance	Shortlist	
2022	André Aciman	Homo Irrealis: Essays	Shortlist	
2022	Teju Cole	Black Paper: Writing in a Dark Time	Shortlist	
2022	Ann Patchett	These Precious Days: Essays	Shortlist	
2023	Judith Thurman	A Left-Handed Woman	Winner	
2023	Jhumpa Lahiri	Translating Myself and Others	Shortlist	
2023	Peter Orner	Still No Word From You	Shortlist	
2023	David Sedaris	Happy-Go-Lucky	Shortlist	
2023	Alison Townsend	The Green Hour: A Natural History of Home	Shortlist	
