= Angela Morales =

American essayist, writer, and educator (born 1966)

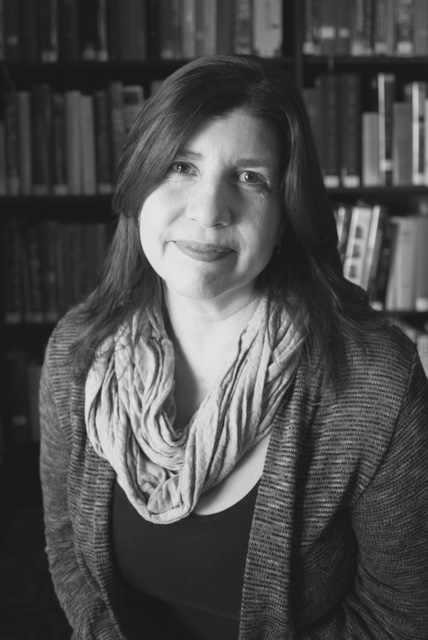
- Born: 1966 (age 59–60); Los Angeles
- Writing career
- Genre: essay
- Notable awards: River Teeth Book Prize; PEN/Diamonstein-Spielvogel Award

Angela Morales (born 1966, Los Angeles) is an American essayist, writer, and educator.

She is the author of The Girls In My Town: Essays, published by the University of New Mexico Press, 2016. Her essays appear in River Teeth, The Baltimore Review, The Los Angeles Review, The Harvard Review, The Southern Review, The Chattahoochee Review, The Pinch, Hobart, Under the Sun, The Indianola Review, and 1966: A Journal of Creative Nonfiction, and other magazines.

== Life ==
Morales grew up in San Gabriel, California. Many of her autobiographical essays describe growing up in Southern California during the 1970s. Some of the themes in her writing include motherhood, violence, female coming-of-age, and Mexican American cultural identity. A graduate of the University of California, Davis and the University of Iowa's Nonfiction Writing Program, Morales currently teaches English at Glendale Community College in Southern California. She lives in Pasadena, California with her husband Patrick Conyers and their children, Mira and Leo.

== Awards ==
Morales is the recipient of the River Teeth Book Prize and the PEN Diamonstein-Spielvogel Award for the Art of the Essay. Her essay "The Girls in My Town" appeared in The Best American Essays, 2013, edited by Cheryl Strayed, and her essay "Bloodyfeathers, R.I.P." appeared as notable essay in Best American Essays 2015. Her essays have been nominated for Pushcart Prizes, and her Master's Thesis, Exhuming Abuelita was awarded the San Francisco Foundation's James Phelan prize for nonfiction manuscript-in-progress. She worked as the Writer-in-Residence in Denali National Park and has been awarded fellowships at MacDowell Colony and Yaddo.

== Works ==
- The Girls in My Town: essays, Albuquerque: University of New Mexico Press, 2016. ISBN 9780826356628, OCLC 914156932
