= South Pasadena High School =

Coordinates: 34.10938°N 118.15373°W

Location
- 1401 Fremont Avenue; South Pasadena, California; United States

Information
- Type: Public secondary
- Motto: Fair play, Strength, Scholarship, Leadership
- Established: 1906
- Principal: John Eldred
- Teaching staff: 64.43 (FTE)
- Grades: 9–12
- Enrollment: 1,427 (2019–20)
- Student to teacher ratio: 23.16
- Colors: Black and Orange
- Athletics conference: CIF-SS Rio Hondo League
- Nickname: Tigers
- Website: www.sphstigers.org

South Pasadena High School (SPHS or "South Pas") is the only public high school serving grades 9–12 in the city of South Pasadena, California. Along with the South Pasadena Middle School and three elementary schools (Arroyo Vista, Marengo, and Monterey Hills) it makes up the South Pasadena Unified School District.

Established in 1905, it is the only public high school in South Pasadena. The campus is on the west side of the city on Fremont Avenue. The school contains several main academic buildings, a performing arts auditorium, a swimming pool, two sets of tennis courts, two indoor gymnasiums, a 400-m outdoor track, and three athletic fields. The school's motto is "Scholarship, Leadership, Strength, and Fair Play." The school colors are orange and black, and the mascot is a tiger.

== History ==
SPHS opened in 1906 after South Pasadena city officials approved a measure to construct a public high school in 1904. It graduated only five students in 1907 before the campus was subsequently expanded. Until 1955, South Pasadena High School was known as South Pasadena-San Marino High School and served both cities. In 1954, the city of San Marino chose to withdraw from SPHS and to established San Marino Unified School District, along with San Marino High School. By then most of the original buildings had been demolished due to safety concerns, and municipal bonds were passed for new constructions. A major expansion effort modernized the campus between 1999 and 2003. In 2014 two students were arrested for plotting to kill three teachers and an unspecified number of students. The police said the boys, who had not been on their radar before but were willing to die to carry out their plan, hatched it a year ago and had been conducting online research on weaponry, body armor, and explosives. They planned to obtain a firearm from a relative as well. Officers initially indicated interpersonal conflicts might have been at play but later declined to comment. A few classmates interviewed by the press suggested that the teens were good students. Neighbors reported that one of them had been bullied by his peers for years. In 2015 a track and field coach of about seven years was sentenced to 180 days of jail time by electronic monitoring for past molestation and sexual battery against two underage female students. He had been placed on administrative leave after being reported. Between 2019 and 2021, new STEM and athletics facilities were added to the campus. Instructions took place in portable classrooms during the construction.

== Athletics ==
The school offers a variety of sports such as baseball, volleyball, football, water polo, basketball, cross country, soccer, track and field, tennis, and others. Additionally, the school also has a marching band, which has won numerous titles in the Western Band Association (WBA) circuit. A new athletic director, Anthony Chan, was hired in 2019.

The football field at South Pasadena High School is known today as Ray Solari Stadium in honor of the former football head coach, where South Pasadena High's football team plays their home games. It is also used for boys and girls' soccer teams and for track and field meets as well as for graduation ceremonies.

== Partnership ==
The school was one of the first to work with the Children's Hospital Los Angeles and the mobile Sports Analysis Lab, to help demonstrate how data is collected, evaluated, and assessed to study athletes biomechanics.

== Recognition and awards ==
In 2019 the school was recognized due to its U.S. News & World Report ranking. It was ranked #1 in California's 41st State Assembly District, #87 in the state and #622 out of 17,000 public high schools within the United States, placing in the top 5% of schools nationwide. It was also ranked #675 out of 5,000 by Newsweek for the top STEM high schools of 2019.

== Notable alumni ==
- Steven Alvarez – actor/business entrepreneur
- William Bradford Bishop – former United States Foreign Service officer, accused murderer and wanted fugitive
- Alison Brie – actress
- John Bush – professional musician, singer for the band Armored Saint
- Wesley Chesbro - California assemblyman and senator
- John Gabbert – associate justice of the California Court of Appeals
- Bobby Garrett – former NFL player
- Mike Giddings - college football coach, NFL scout
- John Hart – actor
- George Hodel – physician accused of 1947 murder of Elizabeth Short, a.k.a. the Black Dahlia, and of committing several additional murders
- William Holden - (William Beedle) – actor
- Tommy Hutton - former Major League Baseball player
- Porochista Khakpour - novelist, writer and reviewer for national and international publications
- Bob Long – former NFL player
- Mary Bono Mack – U.S. congresswoman
- Gordon S. Marshall - businessman, namesake of USC's Marshall School of Business
- Pete McClosky - U.S. congressman
- Adrian Picardi – director
- Bronson Pinchot – actor
- Ward Ritchie – master printer, book designer
- John H. Rousselot - U.S. congressman
- Noelle Scaggs – singer (Fitz and the Tantrums)
- Shanice – singer
- Leslie Smith - mixed martial artist
- Hilary Swank – actress (dropped out)
- Jaleel White – actor
- Kristinia DeBarge – singer
- Chris Spencer – actor/director/comedian
