= Attorney General Morris =

Attorney General Morris may refer to:

- Edward Morris, 1st Baron Morris (1859–1935), Attorney General of Newfoundland
- Francis Asbury Morris (1817–1881), Attorney General of the Republic of Texas
- James Morris (North Dakota judge) (1893–1980), Attorney General of North Dakota
- John Morris, Baron Morris of Aberavon (born 1931), Attorney General for England and Wales, and Attorney General for Northern Ireland
- Michael Morris, Baron Morris (1826–1901), Attorney-General for Ireland
