= San Marino High School =

Coordinates: 34.12646°N 118.09908°W

Location
- 2701 Huntington Drive; San Marino, California; United States

Information
- Other name: SMHS
- Type: Public high school
- Established: 1952
- School district: San Marino Unified School District
- Principal: Benjamin Wolf
- Teaching staff: 43.94 (on FTE basis)
- Grades: 9-12
- Enrollment: 837 (2023-2024)
- Student to teacher ratio: 19.05
- Colors: Royal blue and white
- Athletics conference: CIF-SS Rio Hondo League
- Mascot: Titans
- Newspaper: Titan shield
- Yearbook: Titanian
- Website: www.sanmarinohs.org

San Marino High School (SMHS) is a public high school in San Marino, California, United States, and the only high school in the San Marino Unified School District, Los Angeles County. According to the 2015 California Academic Performance Index Survey, the district is the 52nd highest-performing school in California, with a score of 932 points out of 1,000 possible.

== History ==
The school is located at or near the site of the Tongva village of Sonagna.

San Marino High School was founded in 1952 after 50 years of utilizing South Pasadena High School in nearby South Pasadena. The high school is situated on the former site of Carver Elementary School. The reconstruction began in 1996 and was completed by support with bond issues and rigorous fund-raising by the San Marino Schools Endowment.

San Marino High School is part of the San Marino Unified School District. Its public funding is supplemented by private donations raised through the San Marino Schools Foundation.

San Marino High School's upper football practice field was the location of where Kathy Fiscus fell into an abandoned water well in 1949. It was subsequently capped and covered by the local water district.

San Marino High School was named a National Blue Ribbon School in 2006 and a Gold Medal school by U.S. News & World Report, ranking in the 80s in the nation for December 2007. The California Business for Education Excellence (CBEE) named the school to its Honor Roll in 2008 in the Scholar Schools category. In 2009, the school was among 261 named California Distinguished School by the California Department of Education (CDE).

== Student population ==
As of the 2008-09 school year, the school had an enrollment of 1,096 students (276 seniors) and 59 classroom teachers (on an FTE basis), for a student-teacher ratio of 18.6. The school's racial composition is 60% Asian, 27% white, 10% Hispanic, 1% African American, 1% Two or more Races and 1% other.

== Athletics ==
San Marino has a history of athletic rivalry with South Pasadena High School, a neighboring city school. Due to tradition, games against South Pasadena tend to have a larger crowd and hold more significance versus games against other schools.

In 1998, the school won five straight CIF boys' tennis titles and was ranked number one in USA Today's High School Tennis Teams.

In April 2018, the San Marino High School Winter Drumline advanced to the WGI world class division and ranked 14th in the nation.

On December 5, 2015, the football team won a California Interscholastic Federation Central Section title, defeating Charter Oak High School of Covina by the score of 45-28. On December 12, 2015, they defeated Sierra Canyon School in the CIF State Southern California Regional Small School Division by the score of 36-35. They lost in the CIF Championship game to Central Catholic High School from Modesto.

== Notable alumni ==
- Kathryn Barger – 1978 Los Angeles County Supervisor (5th District)
- Andrés Cantor (born 1962) – 1980 (Emmy-award-winning Spanish-language soccer sportscaster)
- Kim Carnes – 1963 (singer-songwriter)
- Michael Catherwood – 1997 (television and radio personality a.k.a. "Psycho Mike")
- Bob Day – 1961 (1968 Olympian)
- Laurie Garrett – 1969 (Pulitzer Prize-winning journalist)
- Jim Gott – 1980 (retired MLB player, coach for the Philadelphia Phillies)
- Blair Imani – 2012 (activist)
- Gregg Jarrett – 1973 (Fox News anchor)
- Jorge Jarrin – 1973 (LA Dodgers Broadcaster)
- Derek Kan – 1996 (Government Official)
- Scott Melville – 1984 (Professional tennis player)
- Stephan Pastis – 1986 (cartoonist).
- Greg Penner – 1988 (Chairman, Walmart)
- Gary Primm – 1958 (casino owner)
- Bill Redell, football coach and member of the College Football Hall of Fame.
- Donald Segretti – 1959 (political "dirty trickster," organizer)
- Evan Wick – 2016 (wrestler)
