= The Girls in My Town =

2016 collection of essays written by Angela Morales

The Girls in My Town: Essays
- Author: Angela Morales
- Language: English
- Publisher: University of New Mexico Press
- Publication date: 2016
- Publication place: United States
- Media type: Print (Paperback), ebook
- ISBN: 978-0-8263-5662-8 (Paperback)

The Girls in My Town: Essays is a 2016 collection of essays written by Angela Morales, published by the University of New Mexico Press. It won the River Teeth Nonfiction Book Prize and the PEN Diamonstein-Spielvogel Award for the Art of the Essay.
