= David B. Morris =

Writer and scholar

David Brown Morris is a writer and scholar, emeritus professor of literature at the University of Virginia. His main interest is pain and its various manifestations.

Morris wrote an award-winning article about pain for Arthritis Today, and lectured to wide audiences like American Academy of Pain Medicine, American Pain Society, American Society for Pain Management Nurses and The International Association for the Study of Pain (IASP). Morris is a founding co-director of the Taos Writing Retreat for Health Professionals, co-sponsored by Kaiser-Permanente and the University of New Mexico School of Medicine.

== Awards and honors ==
- 1992 PEN/Diamonstein-Spielvogel Award for the Art of the Essay, The Culture of Pain

== Books ==
- The Religious Sublime (1972)
- Alexander Pope: The Genius of Sense (1984)
- The Culture of Pain (1991)
- Earth Warrior (1995), about anti-driftnet campaign in the North Pacific
- Illness and Culture in the Postmodern Age (1998)
