= San Marino, California =

City in California, United States

- City
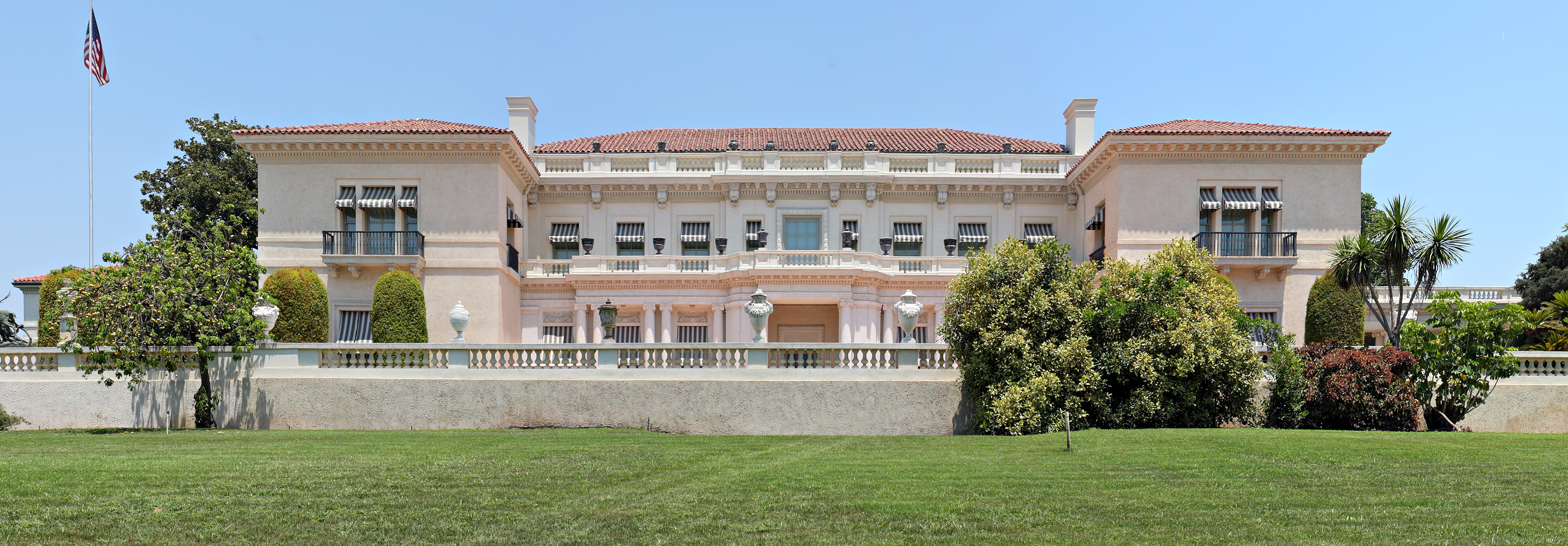
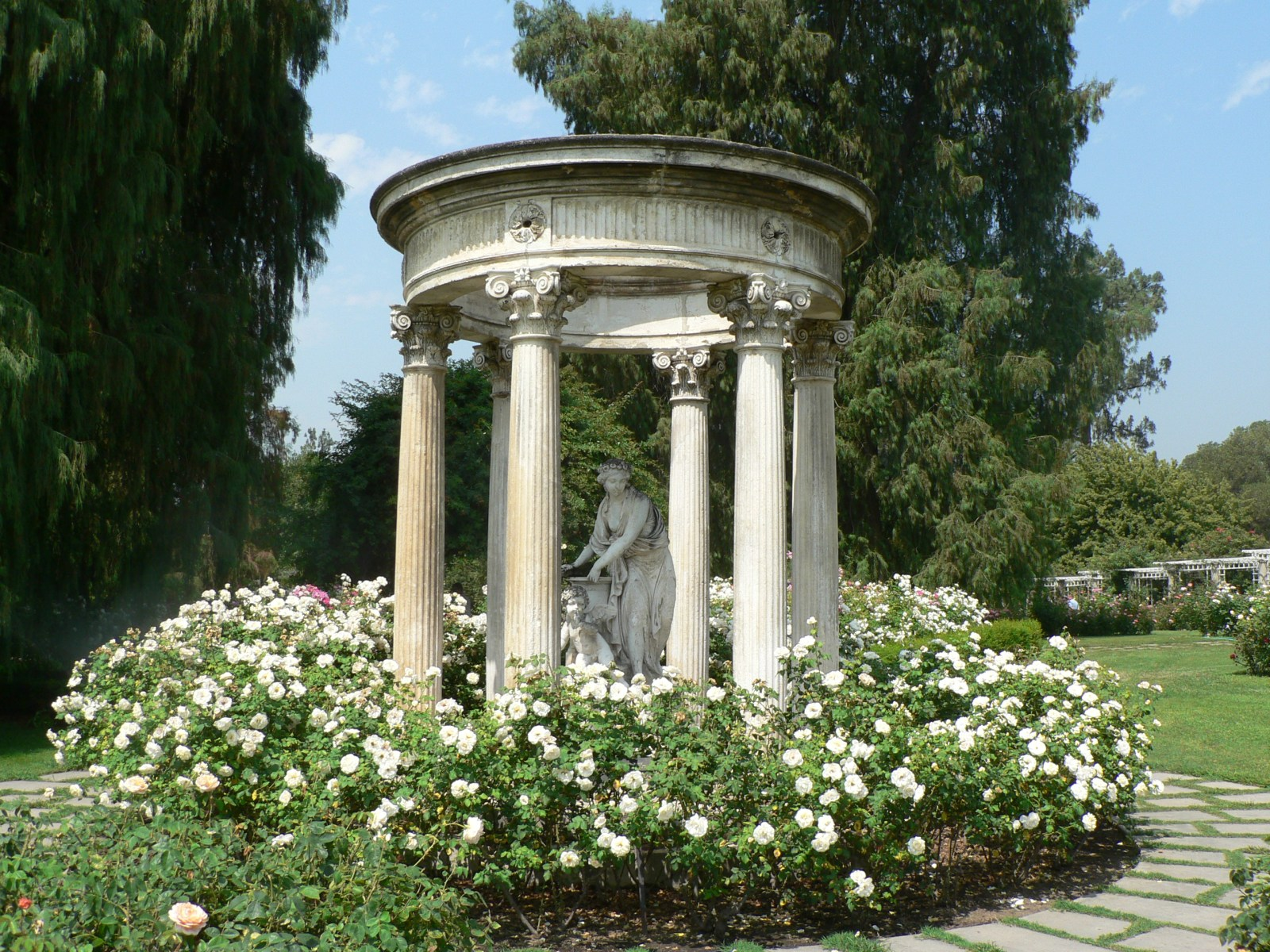
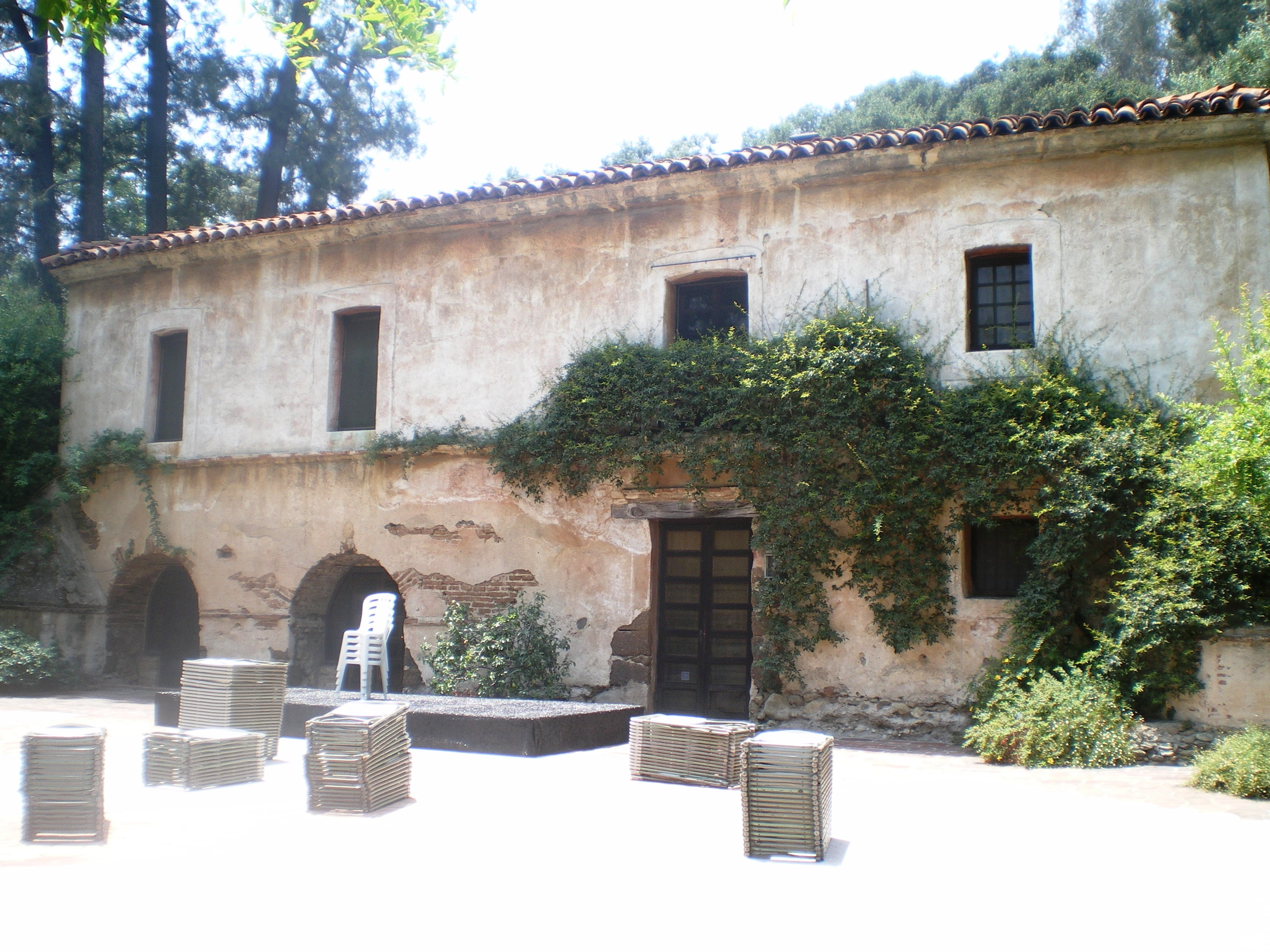
- Counter-Clockwise: Huntington Library, Huntington Gardens, El Molino Viejo.

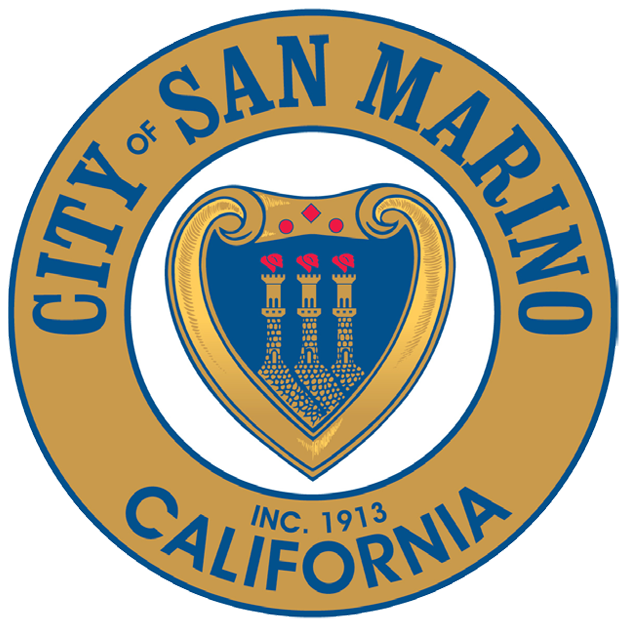
- Seal
- Interactive map of San Marino, California
- Location in the United States San Marino (California) San Marino (the United States)
- Coordinates: 34°7′22″N 118°6′47″W
- Country: United States
- State: California
- County: Los Angeles
- Incorporated: April 25, 1913
- Named for: Republic of San Marino

Government
  - Type: Council Manager
  - Mayor: Tony Chou
  - Vice Mayor: Calvin Lo
  - City Council: City council: • Hunter Chang; • John Chou; • Gretchen Shepherd Romey
  - City Manager: Philippe Eskandar

Area
  - Total: 3.77 sq mi (9.77 km^{2})
  - Land: 3.76 sq mi (9.75 km^{2})
  - Water: 0.0077 sq mi (0.02 km^{2}) 0.16%
- Elevation: 564 ft (172 m)

Population (2020)
  - Total: 12,513
  - Density: 3,320/sq mi (1,280/km^{2})
- Time zone: UTC-8 (PST)
  - Summer (DST): UTC-7 (PDT)
- ZIP codes: 91108, 91118
- Area code: 626
- FIPS code: 06-68224
- GNIS feature ID: 1652789
- Website: sanmarinoca.gov

San Marino is a city in the San Gabriel Valley of Los Angeles County, California, United States. It was incorporated on April 25, 1913. At the 2020 United States census the population was 12,513, a decline from the 2010 United States census.

== History ==
=== Origin of name ===
The city takes its name from the ancient Republic of San Marino, founded by Saint Marinus who fled his home in Dalmatia (modern Croatia) at the time of the Diocletianic Persecution.

The seal of the City of San Marino, California is modeled on that of the republic, depicting the Three Towers of San Marino each capped with a bronze plume, surrounded by a heart-shaped scroll with two roundels and a lozenge (of unknown significance) at the top. The crown representing sovereignty on the original was replaced with five stars, representing the five members of the city's governing body. Beneath the city's seal are crossed palm fronds and orange branches.

The city celebrated its centennial in 2013, including publication by the San Marino Historical Society of a 268-page book, San Marino, A Centennial History, by Elizabeth Pomeroy. In September 2014, this book and author Elizabeth Pomeroy received a prestigious Award of Merit for Leadership in History from the American Association for State and Local History (AASLH).

=== Early history ===
The site of San Marino was originally occupied by a village of Tongva (Gabrieleño) Indians located approximately where the Huntington School is today. The area was part of the lands of the San Gabriel Mission. Principal portions of San Marino were included in an 1838 Mexican land grant of 128 acres to Victoria Bartolmea Reid, a Gabrieleña Indian. (After her first husband, also a Gabrieleño, died in 1836 of smallpox, she remarried Scotsman Hugo Reid in 1837). She called the property Rancho Huerta de Cuati. After Hugo Reid's death in 1852, Señora Reid sold her rancho in 1854 to Don Benito Wilson, the first Anglo owner of Rancho San Pascual. In 1873, Don Benito conveyed to his son-in-law, James DeBarth Shorb, 500 acres (2.0 km^{2}), including Rancho Huerta de Cuati, which Shorb named "San Marino" after his grandfather's plantation in Maryland, which, in turn, was named after the Republic of San Marino located on the Italian Peninsula in Europe.

=== History (1900s) ===
In 1903, the Shorb rancho was purchased by Henry E. Huntington (1850–1927), who built a large mansion on the property. The site of the Shorb/Huntington rancho is occupied today by the Huntington Library, which houses a world-renowned art collection, research and rare-book library, and botanical gardens. In 1913 the three primary ranchos of Wilson, Patton, and Huntington, together with the subdivided areas from those and smaller ranchos, such as the Stoneman, White, and Rose ranchos, were incorporated as the city of San Marino.

The first mayor of the city of San Marino was George Smith Patton (1856–1927), the son of a slain Confederate States of America colonel in the U.S. Civil War (also named George Smith Patton, 1833–1864). He married Ruth Wilson, the daughter of Don Benito Wilson. Their son was the World War II general George S. Patton Jr.

To a prior generation of Southern Californians, San Marino was known for its old-money wealth and as a bastion of the region's WASP gentry. By mid-century, however, other European ethnic groups had become the majority.

In the 1980s, San Marino was home to serial killer and con-man Christian Gerhartsreiter. Posing as a member of the British aristocracy and relative of Louis Mountbatten, 1st Earl Mountbatten, Gerhartsreiter murdered John and Linda Sohus in 1985. Gerhartsreiter then fled to Greenwich, Connecticut and assumed a new alias. The body of John Sohus was discovered in San Marino in 1994 and Gerhartsreiter was later convicted of the killing in 2013. Linda Sohus' body has never been found.

In 1970, the city was 99.7% White. By 1990, the city's households were 23.7% Asian.

=== History (2000s) ===
In 2000, the city's Asian households increased to 40%.

In recent decades, immigrants of Chinese and Taiwanese ancestry have come to represent more than 60% of the population, perhaps due to its location in the San Gabriel Valley, known to be a popular destination for East Asian immigrants.

== Geography ==
The city is located in the San Rafael Hills, and it is divided into seven zones, based on minimum lot size. The smallest lot size is about 4,500 square feet (420 m^{2}), with many averaging over 30,000 square feet (2,800 m^{2}). Because of this and other factors, most of the homes in San Marino, built between 1920 and 1950, do not resemble the houses in surrounding Southern California neighborhoods (with the exception, perhaps, of neighboring portions of Pasadena). San Marino has also fostered a sense of historic preservation. With minor exceptions, the city has strict design review and zoning laws.

According to the United States Census Bureau, the city has a total area of 3.8 square miles (9.8 km^{2}), virtually all land.

San Marino is restrictive of commercial operations in the city. It is one of the few cities that requires commercial vehicles to have permits to work within the city.

== Demographics ==
Historical population
Census	Pop.	Note	%±
1920	584		—
1930	3,730		538.7%
1940	8,175		119.2%
1950	11,230		37.4%
1960	13,658		21.6%
1970	14,177		3.8%
1980	13,307		−6.1%
1990	12,959		−2.6%
2000	12,945		−0.1%
2010	13,147		1.6%
2020	12,513		−4.8%
2024 (est.)	12,105	▼	−3.3%
U.S. Decennial Census; 1850–1870 1880-1890; 1900 1910 1920; 1930 1940 1950; 1960 1970 1980; 1990 2000 2010; 2020

San Marino first appeared as a census-designated place in the 1920 U.S. census. Prior to incorporation, the community belonged to unincorporated San Gabriel township.

=== Racial and ethnic composition ===
San Marino city, California – Racial and ethnic composition Note: the US Census treats Hispanic/Latino as an ethnic category. This table excludes Latinos from the racial categories and assigns them to a separate category. Hispanics/Latinos may be of any race.
Race / Ethnicity (NH = Non-Hispanic)	2020	2010	2000	1990	1980
White alone (NH)	27.7% (3,469)	37.1% (4,872)	44.6% (5,771)	62.4% (8,090)	87.8% (11,688)
Black alone (NH)	0.5% (58)	0.4% (53)	0.2% (29)	0.2% (28)	0.4% (52)
American Indian alone (NH)	0% (4)	0% (1)	0% (0)	0.1% (11)	0% (0)
Asian alone (NH)	60.6% (7,581)	53.3% (7,010)	48.4% (6,271)	32.1% (4,166)	7.1% (947)
Pacific Islander alone (NH)	0.1% (7)	0% (2)	0.1% (9)		
Other race alone (NH)	0.2% (22)	0.2% (25)	0.2% (24)	0.1% (9)	0% (0)
Multiracial (NH)	3.9% (484)	2.5% (329)	2.1% (270)	—	—
Hispanic/Latino (any race)	7.1% (888)	6.5% (855)	4.4% (571)	5.1% (655)	4.7% (620)

=== 2020 census ===
As of the 2020 census, San Marino had a population of 12,513, down from 13,147 in 2010. The median age was 48.1 years. 20.9% of residents were under the age of 18 and 23.4% of residents were 65 years of age or older. For every 100 females, there were 95.3 males, and for every 100 females age 18 and over, there were 89.8 males.

100.0% of residents lived in urban areas, while 0.0% lived in rural areas.

There were 4,208 households in San Marino, of which 35.8% had children under the age of 18 living in them. Of all households, 69.6% were married-couple households, 8.7% were households with a male householder and no spouse or partner present, and 20.1% were households with a female householder and no spouse or partner present. About 12.5% of all households were made up of individuals, and 8.4% had someone living alone who was 65 years of age or older.

There were 4,482 housing units, of which 6.1% were vacant. The homeowner vacancy rate was 1.3% and the rental vacancy rate was 5.7%.

The most reported ancestries were Chinese (43.9%), Taiwanese (10.3%), English (10.1%), German (8.6%), Irish (7.5%), and Mexican (4.0%).

=== 2010 census ===
The 2010 United States census reported that San Marino had a population of 13,147. The population density was 3,483.4 inhabitants per square mile (1,344.9/km^{2}). The racial makeup of San Marino was 5,434 (41.3%) White (37.1% Non-Hispanic White), 55 (0.4%) African American, 5 (0.0%) Native American, 7,039 (53.5%) Asian, 2 (0.0%) Pacific Islander, 198 (1.5%) from other races, and 414 (3.1%) from two or more races. Hispanic or Latino of any race were 855 persons (6.5%).

The census reported that 13,066 people (99.4% of the population) lived in households, 81 (0.6%) lived in non-institutionalized group quarters, and 0 (0%) were institutionalized.

There were 4,330 households, out of which 1,818 (42.0%) had children under the age of 18 living in them, 3,220 (74.4%) were opposite-sex married couples living together, 367 (8.5%) had a female householder with no husband present, 143 (3.3%) had a male householder with no wife present. There were 42 (1.0%) unmarried opposite-sex partnerships, and 22 (0.5%) same-sex married couples or partnerships. Of all households, 531 (12.3%) were made up of individuals, and 359 (8.3%) had someone living alone who was 65 years of age or older. The average household size was 3.02. There were 3,730 families (86.1% of all households); the average family size was 3.28.

The population was spread out, with 3,422 people (26.0%) under the age of 18, 712 people (5.4%) aged 18 to 24, 2,353 people (17.9%) aged 25 to 44, 4,351 people (33.1%) aged 45 to 64, and 2,309 people (17.6%) who were 65 years of age or older. The median age was 45.3 years. For every 100 females, there were 92.4 males. For every 100 females age 18 and over, there were 87.7 males.

There were 4,477 housing units at an average density of 1,186.2 units per square mile (458.0 units/km^{2}), of which 3,959 (91.4%) were owner-occupied, and 371 (8.6%) were occupied by renters. The homeowner vacancy rate was 0.5%; the rental vacancy rate was 6.5%; 11,834 people (90.0% of the population) lived in owner-occupied housing units and 1,232 people (9.4%) lived in rental housing units.

=== 2000 census ===
As of the census of 2000, there were 12,945 people, 4,266 households, and 3,673 families residing in the city. The population density was 3,430.5 inhabitants per square mile (1,324.5/km^{2}). There were 4,437 housing units at an average density of 1,175.8 units per square mile (454.0 units/km^{2}). The racial makeup of the city was 51.98% White, 0.15% African American, 0.05% Native American, 47.7% Asian, 0.08% Pacific Islander, 1.04% from other races, and 2.30% from two or more races. Hispanic or Latino of any race were 3.25% of the population. More than one-third of the city's population, 33.3%, was Chinese.

There were 4,266 households, out of which 42% had children under the age of 18 living with them, 75% were married couples living together, 8.6% had a female householder with no husband present, and 13.9% were non-families. Of all households 12% were made up of individuals, and 7.3% had someone living alone who was 65 years of age or older. The average household size was 3.03 and the average family size was 3.29.

In the city, the age distribution of the population showed 26.5% under the age of 18, 6.4% from 18 to 24, 21.5% from 25 to 44, 29.4% from 45 to 64, and 16.2% who were 65 years of age or older. The median age was 43 years (this was older than average age in the U.S.). For every 100 females, there were 93.1 males. For every 100 females age 18 and over, there were 89.1 males.

== Arts and culture ==
=== Notable sites ===
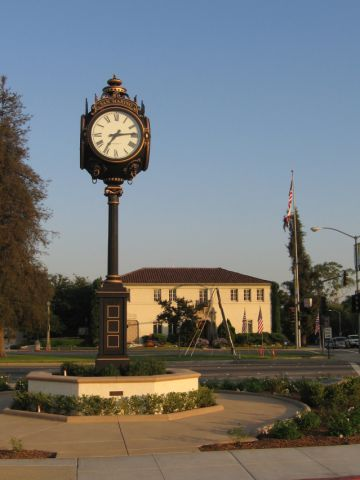
Rotary Centennial Clock in San Marino, with City Hall in the background

San Marino is the location of the Huntington Library, Art Museum, and Botanical Gardens. In 1919, Henry E. Huntington provided limited access to his art collection, library containing the rare books and historical documents, and botanical collection. The Huntington's library contains 8 million manuscripts, 440,000 rare books, 454,000 reference books, 900,000 prints and ephemera, 777,000 photographs, and 300,000 digital files. The Huntington's art collections are housed in his large Neoclassical–Palladian mansion and feature European and American art spanning more than 500 years. In addition, the surrounding botanical gardens span approximately 120 acres and contain more than a dozen themed gardens. Collectively, the institution is known as "The Huntington Library, Art Collections and Botanical Gardens", or as "The Huntington," to the public.

El Molino Viejo ("The Old Mill"), completed about 1816 as a grist mill for Mission San Gabriel Arcángel, is in San Marino. The original two-story structure measured 53 by 26 feet (16.2 by 7.9 m). It is the oldest commercial building in Southern California. The town is located on the former lands of the historic Rancho Huerta de Cuati.

The Edwin Hubble House: From 1925 to 1953, this two-story stucco home was the residence of Edwin Hubble, one of America's great 20th-century astronomers, who, among other accomplishments, discovered extragalactic nebulae and their separation from each other. It is a National Historic Landmark.

The Michael White Adobe House is located on the campus of San Marino High School and houses the San Marino Historical Society archives.

The University of Southern California owns a house in San Marino which is used as the residence of the president of the university. The residence and grounds often are used for university events.

Across from City Hall, at the northeast corner of Huntington Drive and San Marino Avenue, is the Centennial Clock, donated to the community in 2005 by the Rotary Club of San Marino in celebration of Rotary International's 100th anniversary. Dedicated on July 4, 2005, the nineteen foot high clock includes a time capsule with artifacts donated by residents and community organizations which is to be opened on July 4, 2039, to mark the 100th anniversary of the Rotary Club of San Marino.

In the middle of San Marino lies Lacy Park, a 30-acre (120,000 m^{2}) expanse of grass and trees. The site was originally a sag pond named Wilson Lake (later Kewen Lake) which eventually dried up due to irrigation and other uses. The land was purchased by the city in 1925 and dedicated as a park. It is one of the few neighborhood parks that charge for admission, with a $5 fee for non-San Marino residents on weekends. A picnic area is often the site of musical concerts, civic events and pancake breakfasts. Within the park are two walking loops: an inner loop of approximately 3/4 mile in length, and an outer loop of approximately 1-mile (1.6 km) in length. Dogs are welcome with their owners, providing they are on a leash. In recent years, proposals from SMHS alumni Brent and Derek Barker to build a dedicated dog park on the unlandscaped western edge of the park have been shelved due to strident opposition from some of the city's elderly residents. The park includes six championship tennis courts and a pro shop, administered by the San Marino Tennis Foundation. At the west entrance of the park is the Rose Arbor, which is of special significance for the people of San Marino. It is sixty years old and has long been a source of beauty and tranquility to many residents. In recent years the care and upkeep of the Rose Arbor itself has been augmented by private donations from residents who have chosen to sponsor individual posts. The park recently built a memorial to General George S. Patton (a native of San Marino) and also a large memorial to the Armed Forces along with a statue of a sad soldier. The memorial includes the names of all military personnel from San Marino.

The city's local newspaper office is located on Mission St., in the city's “old town”. The San Marino Tribune has been the official newspaper of the city since 1929. There are two sections of the weekly paper, an "A" section and a "B" section, the distinction being that it covers San Marino news as well as news in Pasadena, San Gabriel, Alhambra, Arcadia and South Pasadena.

== Government ==
=== Local government ===
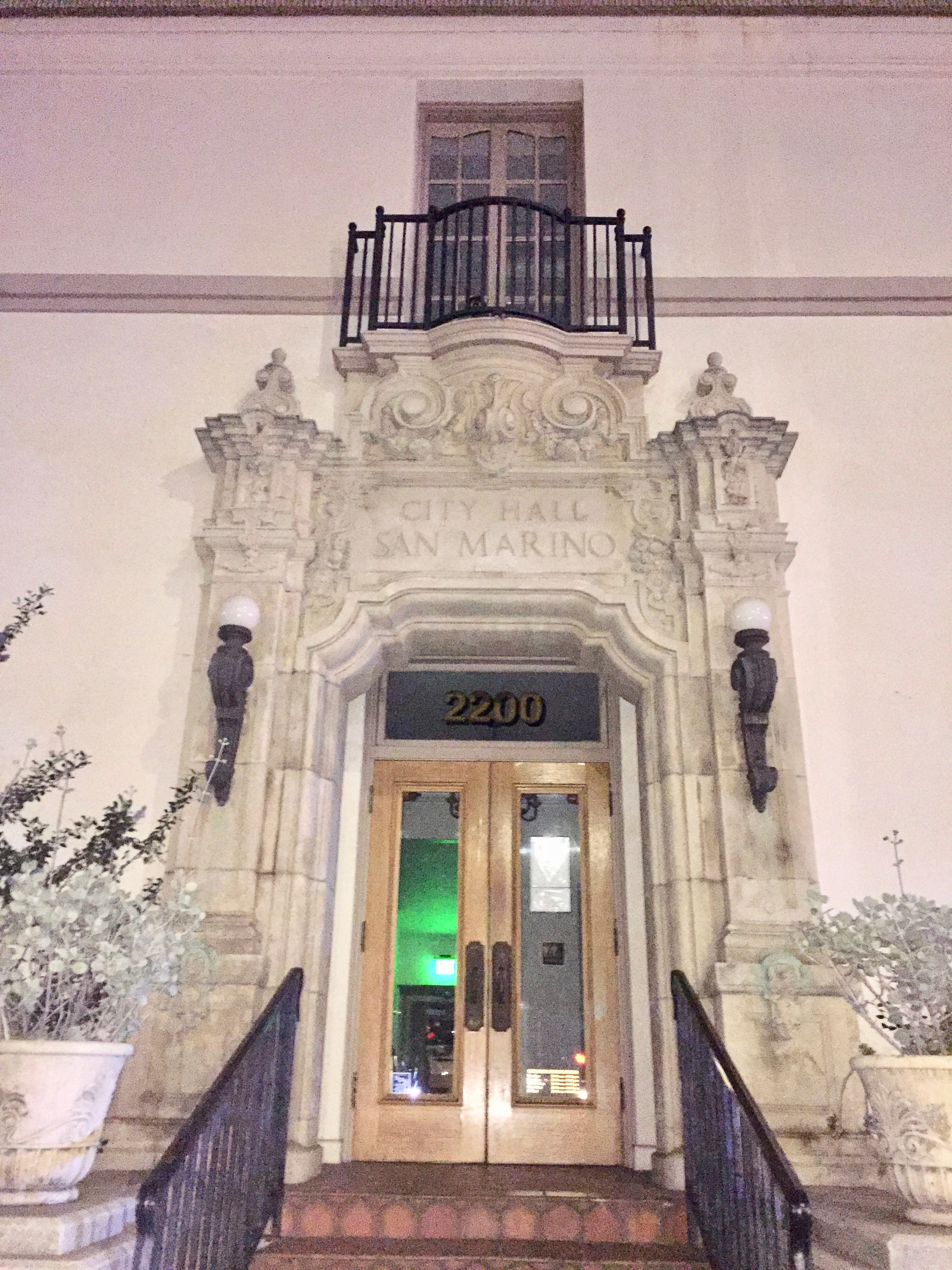
San Marino City Hall.

Governing the City of San Marino is a city council of five members, elected by the people for a four-year term. Elections are consolidated with the county and are held on the first Tuesday, following the first Monday in November of odd numbered years. Terms are staggered so that three seats are available during one election cycle and two seats are available during the next cycle. In 2015, the state enacted a law to require municipalities to consolidate their elections beginning January 1, 2018. The five council members serve without any financial compensation and elect one of their own members as Mayor.

The current city council members are:

- Mayor: Tony Chou (2026)
- Vice mayor: Calvin Lo (2026)
- Council members: Hunter Chang, John Chou, Gretchen Shepherd Romey (2026)

San Marino's Fiscal Year 2019-2020 operating budget is $25,807,192. The city manager reports that for FY 2019-2020 "personnel costs comprise 2/3rds of the operating budget, and the largest portion of the increase from FY 2018-2019 is in that area."

=== List of mayors ===
This is a list of San Marino mayors by year:

- 1913-1922 George S. Patton
- 1922 William L. Valentine
- 1922-1924 George S. Patton
- 1924-1942 Richard H. Lacy
- 1980-1984 Lynn P. Reitnouer
- 1990 Suzanne Crowell
- 2001 Matthew Lin, the first Chinese-American mayor of San Marino
- 2009 Eugene Sun
- 2012 Richard Sun
- 2013 Richard Ward
- 2015 Eugene Sun
- 2016 Allan Yung
- 2017 Richard Sun
- 2018 Steve Talt
- 2019 Steven Huang
- 2020 Gretchen Shepherd Romey
- 2021 Ken Ude
- 2022 Susan Jakubowski
- 2023 Steve Talt
- 2024 Steven Huang
- 2025 Gretchen Shepherd Romey
- 2026 Tony Chou

=== State and federal representation ===
In the House of Representatives, San Marino is located in California's 28th congressional district, represented by Democrat Judy Chu.

San Marino is in Los Angeles County Supervisorial District 5.

== Politics ==
United States presidential election results for San Marino, California
Year	Republican		Democratic		Third party(ies)	
Year	No.	%	No.	%	No.	%
2000	2,499	65.30%	1,215	31.75%	113	2.95%
2004	4,062	62.14%	2,404	36.78%	71	1.09%
2008	3,596	54.14%	2,952	44.44%	94	1.42%
2012	3,561	58.00%	2,480	40.39%	99	1.61%
2016	2,224	39.36%	3,102	54.89%	325	5.75%
2020	2,844	38.71%	4,353	59.26%	149	2.03%
2024	2,685	40.91%	3,689	56.21%	189	2.88%

At the presidential level, San Marino has transitioned from Republican wins to solidly Democrat. For comparison, Los Angeles County as a whole remains stalwartly Democrat but had a modest Republican shift from 2008-2024.

== Education ==
On September 9, 1913, the first San Marino school was opened at the corner of Monterey Road, then called Calle de Lopez, and Oak Knoll, in what was known as the Old Mayberry Home. There were three teachers and thirty-five pupils from kindergarten through the eighth grade; high school students attended South Pasadena High School until San Marino High School was founded in 1952. San Marino High School graduated its first class in 1956. The high school's mascot, "The Titans", comes from Mt. Titano, in the Republic of San Marino.

San Marino High School is situated on the former site of Carver Elementary School. In 1996, the high school reconstruction was begun and the school is now equipped with new laboratories, classrooms, and Ethernet connections, supported mainly by bond issues and rigorous fund-raising by the San Marino Schools Endowment. The new buildings include a brand new cafeteria, orchestra and band room, dance studio, journalism lab, and renovated auditoriums, as well as a renovated baseball field and a brand new football field/track.

San Marino High School is part of the San Marino Unified School District. Its public funding is supplemented by private donations raised through the San Marino Schools Foundation. Each year, the Foundation raises funds necessary to balance the District's budget. To date, the San Marino Schools Foundation has contributed $18,268,485 to the schools since its inception in March 1980. From 2013 to 2017, the district was noted for having the highest percentage of students who met and exceeded the California Assessment of Student Performance and Progress standards.

The San Marino Unified School District has been ranked as the top unified school district in the state of California for eighteen consecutive years, including 2018. Each of its public primary schools has also been honored as a California Distinguished School and a National Blue Ribbon School.

There are four public schools in San Marino Unified School District:

- Valentine Elementary School
- Carver Elementary School
- Huntington Middle School
- San Marino High School

The two elementary schools offer instruction for grades K-5, the middle school for grades 6–8, and the high school for grades 9–12. The middle school was named Henry E. Huntington School, after San Marino's "first citizen." In 1953, a new K. L. Carver Elementary was completed at its current location on San Gabriel Boulevard and was named after K. L. Carver, a long-serving school board member. Stoneman Elementary School, named for Governor George Stoneman, who had resided in San Marino, is no longer used for instruction by San Marino School District. The former school is now leased by the San Marino City Recreation Department and houses San Marino Unified School District special education staff.

In November 2007, San Marino High School was ranked 82nd on a list of the best high schools in the nation, according to U.S. News & World Report.

=== Private schools ===
- Southwestern Academy, a private college preparatory school, was founded on April 7, 1924. The campus was part of an original Spanish grant (the old ranch grew orange and avocado trees) and the land was subsequently legalized by Abraham Lincoln. "Southwestern Academy" was named to capture the distinctive spirit of the Southwestern United States. Pioneer Hall, which was Southwestern's original campus building, was the home of then-Governor George Stoneman.
- Saints Felicitas and Perpetua school is a Catholic school that offers education in grades K-8. The city took the Archdiocese of Los Angeles to the Supreme Court to block the construction of the school, as it was attempting to demolish a historical site called Casa Blanca or the Old Adobe (at one time the Luther Harvey Titus Adobe) to make way for the new school. Saints Felicitas & Perpetua School was completed and dedicated in 1950.

== Media ==
=== Newspapers ===
The city is served by the San Marino Tribune, a paid community weekly newspaper and the San Marino Weekly, also a community news website.

The independent, non-corporate community newspaper Colorado Boulevard Newspaper covers the city of San Marino both in print and online, along with neighboring cities in the western San Gabriel Valley.

== Infrastructure ==
The city currently is served by the San Marino Police Department.

The Crowell Public Library opened in 2008.

As of 2026 the Pasadena Humane Society contracts with the City of San Marino for animal services.

== Notable people ==
- Lee Baca, former sheriff of Los Angeles County
- Andrew D. Bernstein, senior director, NBA Photos
- John Bryson, president of Edison International and former United States Secretary of Commerce
- Henry Bumstead, production designer, winner of two Academy Awards, To Kill a Mockingbird
- Kaitlyn Chen, professional basketball player, Golden State Valkyries
- Drucilla Cornell, author, chairman in jurisprudence at the University of Cape Town; S.M.H.S. graduate
- Christine Craft, attorney, KGO radio personality and former television news anchor
- Mark Cronin, television producer
- Peter B. Dervan, awarded the National Medal of Science in Chemistry, professor at Caltech
- Darren Dreifort, former MLB pitcher, Los Angeles Dodgers
- Don Eitner, actor
- Christian Gerhartsreiter, serial imposter and convicted murderer, lived here using the pseudonym Christopher Chichester
- James G. Ellis, dean of the Marshall School of Business at USC
- Jim Gott, former MLB pitcher for Los Angeles Dodgers, Pittsburgh Pirates, San Francisco Giants
- Pat Haden, athletic director of USC and former pro quarterback for the Los Angeles Rams
- John Hart, actor, the Masked Man in The Lone Ranger from 1952 to 1954
- Stephen Hillenburg, animator, writer and television producer, creator of SpongeBob SquarePants
- Edwin Hubble, astronomer, changed view of universe per galaxy redshift, leading to Big Bang cosmology
- Henry E. Huntington, railroad executive, founder of The Huntington Library
- Jaime Jarrín, Spanish-language broadcaster for Los Angeles Dodgers, recipient of the Ford C. Frick Award, Baseball Hall of Fame
- Jane Kaczmarek, actress, Saturday Night Live, Pleasantville, Malcolm in the Middle
- Howard Kazanjian, film producer for Raiders of the Lost Ark, Return of the Jedi; former vice president at Lucasfilm
- Herman Leonard, jazz photographer, photo collection is in the permanent archives in the Smithsonian Museum in Washington, D.C.
- Thomas Mack, former right guard, NFL, Los Angeles Rams
- Elliot Meyerowitz, chairman, Division of Biology at the California Institute of Technology
- Robert A. Millikan, experimental physicist, awarded the 1923 Nobel Prize in Physics for the electron charge
- Adolfo Müller-Ury, Swiss-born American painter, noted for portraits of popes and presidents
- Charles A. Nichols, animation director, Hannah-Barbara, Walt Disney
- C. L. Max Nikias, president of USC
- Nancy O'Dell, television personality, Access Hollywood
- Merlin Olsen (1940–2010), former defensive lineman, NFL, Los Angeles Rams, actor (Little House on the Prairie), sportscaster NBC.
- Stephan Pastis, comic artist, Pearls Before Swine
- George S. Patton Sr. (1856–1927), attorney, first mayor of San Marino, California (1913–1922)
- George S. Patton Jr. (1885–1945), general in the U.S. Army, World War II
- Michael W. Perry, former chairman and CEO of IndyMac Bank
- Steven B. Sample, former president of USC
- Rob Schneider, actor, comedian. Saturday Night Live, Deuce Bigalow: Male Gigolo, The Hot Chick and Grown Ups.
- Donald Segretti, political operative, involved in Watergate
- Tim Sloan, ex-CEO of Wells Fargo
- Joachim Splichal, chef and founder of the Patina Restaurant Group
- George Stoneman, 15th governor of California, general in the Civil War Union Army
- Bradley Whitford, actor, The West Wing, Studio 60 on the Sunset Strip, Billy Madison
- Yanis C. Yortsos, dean of the Viterbi School of Engineering at USC
- Joseph Wambaugh, writer, including the novel The New Centurions and the nonfiction book The Onion Field
- Ahmed H. Zewail, awarded the Nobel Prize in Chemistry, femtochemistry, chair of Chemistry at Caltech

== In popular culture ==
=== Movies ===
Father of the Bride, The Wedding Singer, In Name Only, and The Holiday were filmed in San Marino.

== See also ==
- California's 25th State Senate district
- History of the Chinese Americans in Los Angeles
- Governor Stoneman Adobe, Los Robles California Historical Landmark
- El Molino Viejo California Historical Landmark
