= David Morris (United States Army officer) =

American major general

David A. Morris
- Military career
- Allegiance: United States of America
- Branch: United States Army
- Service years: 1975-present
- Rank: Major General (United States Army)
- Commands: USACAPOC(A)
- Conflicts: El Salvador; Desert Storm; Enduring Freedom; Iraqi Freedom

David A. Morris is an American major general (retired) who is the founder and owner of Decisive Edge, LLC, a consulting firm focused on the development of business strategies for the Special Operations and intelligence communities.

== Military career and background ==
Morris graduated from the United States Military Academy at West Point, New York in 1975 and served on active duty as an Infantry and Special Forces officer until 1984.

His active duty assignments were highlighted by a tour as a Special Forces detachment commander and advisor during the Salvadoran Civil War in 1980 and 1981 while a member of the 7th Special Forces Group. He also served as a Special Forces instructor at Fort Bragg, North Carolina, in addition to operational assignments with Special Forces units.

As a United States Army Reserve soldier, Morris served with the Joint Special Operations Agency, the U.S. Special Operations Command (USSOCOM), the U.S. Southern Command (SOUTHCOM), Special Operations Command Europe (SOCEUR), and with the Special Operations Command Joint Forces Command (SOCJFCOM), where he commanded the Joint Reserve Unit. As a Brigadier General, he served as the Deputy Commanding General of the US Army Civil Affairs and Psychological Operations Command (Airborne) (USACAPOC (A)) and later as Commanding General from 2007 to 2009. From 2009 to 2010, he served as deputy director of the Joint Capabilities Directorate (J8), USJFCOM, and later as the Director of the Joint Irregular Warfare Center which included duties as the Executive Agent for Joint Urban Operations for the Department of Defense. He retired in January 2012, after a short tour on the Army staff.

Morris has served as a guest lecturer at the United States Naval Post Graduate School, and also as an adjunct professor with the American Public University System, teaching graduate level courses in Special Operations and Joint Operations. He was the Senior National Security Advisor for James Madison University in 2012–2013. From 2012 to 2014, He was the Vice President for Special Operations and Intelligence Strategy for Dyncorp International. Morris was a panel member and key note speaker for the Citadel 2013 Intelligence and Security Conference. He has served multiple times as the Master of Ceremonies for the annual New York CIty US Army Birthday Gala.

From 2014 to 2017, Morris served as chairman of the Board of the Green Beret Foundation, a 501 (c) (3) non-profit organization that supports the US Army's Special Forces Regiment members and their families in a time of need. He currently serves on the advisory board of United Water Federal Systems and Adhesyis Medical, Inc.

A veteran of the global war on terrorism, Morris mobilized for Operation Desert Storm for service with USSOCOM, Operation Enduring Freedom with SOCJFCOM, and Operation Iraqi Freedom, where he served as the Commander, Combined Joint Special Operations Task Force-Arabian Peninsula in Iraq.

In addition to his degree from West Point, Morris holds a Master of Public Administration with a triple major from Golden Gate University, and is a graduate of the Army Command and General Staff College, and US Army War College.

As a civilian, Morris had extensive service in the intelligence community, including assignments with the Central Intelligence Agency, the Intelligence Directorates of the U.S. Special Operations Command and the United States European Command (EUCOM). He was the senior civilian for the Joint Analysis Center, RAF Molesworth in Great Britain, and last served as a member of the Senior Intelligence Executive Service at the U.S. Joint Forces Command, where he was the Director of Intelligence Policy, Plans and Programs.

Maj. Gen. Morris also worked in the private sector for a period of time where he was responsible for the research and development of planning and analytical methodologies and tools to support Special Operations, Intelligence and Counterterrorism.

His most significant military awards and decorations include the Army Distinguished Service Medal, Defense Superior Service Medal, Legion of Merit, Bronze Star, Defense Meritorious Service Medal, two Joint Service Commendation Medals, Army Commendation Medal, two Combat Infantryman Badges, Special Forces Tab, Ranger Tab, Master Parachutist Badge, Colombian Lancero (Ranger) Badge and parachutist badges of nine foreign nations.
