= David Morris (jeweller) =

British luxury jeweller

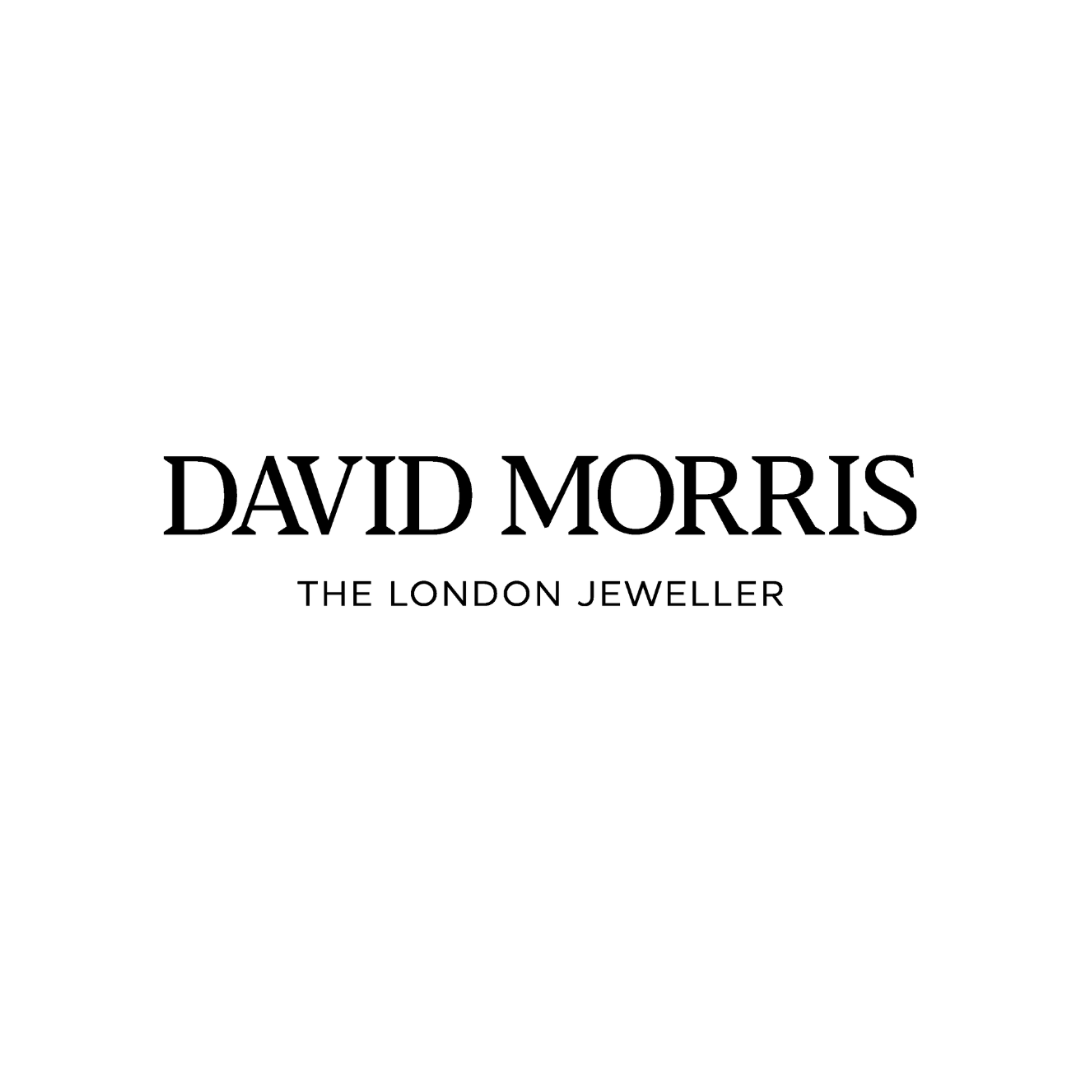
- Industry: Jeweller
- Founded: 1962, London, UK
- Founder: David Morris
- Number of locations: London, Baku, Harrods, Dubai, Abu Dhabi, Doha, Riyadh, Osaka, Oman, Paris
- Key people: Jeremy Morris (CEO & Creative Director)
- Website: www.davidmorris.com

David Morris is a British luxury jeweller famed for designing, crafting and selling fine jewellery and watches. It was founded in 1962, by David Morris and remains family owned. Throughout its 50-year history David Morris has produced a number of notable works, including the Miss World crown, jewellery for the James Bond film franchise and various pieces commissioned by royal families.

== History ==
David Morris began his career at the age of 15 as an apprentice in London's jewellery quarter, Hatton Garden. Having just graduated as a goldsmith from London's Central School of Arts and Crafts (now part of the Central Saint Martin School of Arts and Design), David Morris opened his first Hatton Garden store in 1962. He and his design partner successively claimed the 9th and 10th De Beers Diamonds International Awards held annually in New York, in 1963 and 1964.

Jeremy Morris took over the helm of David Morris from his father in 2003 and is now David Morris' managing director and principal designer. Jeremy studied fine art in London, with 5 years apprenticing with Place Vendôme jewellers and an Antwerp diamond supplier.

Jeremy Morris has been commissioned to create jewels for the late Gianni Versace and Barbra Streisand while Keira Knightley, Oprah Winfrey, Yasmin Le Bon, Catherine Deneuve, Kate Winslet, Catherine Zeta-Jones and Adele are amongst many to have appeared on the red carpet in David Morris jewellery.

== Locations ==
In 1969, David Morris moved to its first Mayfair location on Conduit Street and in 1996 relocated to its current headquarters at 180 New Bond Street. David Morris has one of the last workshops on Bond Street, above the boutique.

The London flagship is a townhouse dating from 1908 and is one of the few historically Grade II* listed buildings on Bond Street. It was designed by Scots architect William Flockhart.

In addition to the New Bond Street flagship, David Morris has further boutiques in Harrods - London, Dubai, Abu Dhabi, Doha and Hong Kong. The brand is also represented through partners in Baku, Riyadh and Jeddah.

== Notable works ==
=== Royal Connections ===
David Morris' first royal connection came in the form of a commission from the Government of Liechtenstein for a bespoke sapphire and diamond tiara which was presented to Countess Kinsky of Austria by Crown Prince Hans Adam on the occasion of their marriage in July 1967.

More recently, a David Morris creation was seen around the world on the bonnet of the vintage Aston Martin car driven down the Mall in London by the Duke and Duchess of Cambridge on their wedding day. The car, which belonged to the Prince of Wales, was a gift from his mother the Queen and is mounted with a small dragon, a commission from David Morris for the prince's 21st birthday.

=== Miss World crown ===
In 1972 David Morris was approached by Miss World founder Eric Morley to redesign the existing crown. David Morris conceived a creation of turquoise, lapis lazuli and diamonds that is still in use today.

=== James Bond ===
According to an interview with Country & Townhouse magazine, a friendship between producer Albert "Cubby" Broccoli and David Morris led to a long running association with the James Bond films. Beginning in 1971, David Morris gems were used in the title sequence of Diamonds are Forever, while in 1974 Maud Adams appeared in David Morris jewels on the set of The Man with the Golden Gun. Most memorable was the scalloped diamond "Bond" riviere necklace worn by Teri Hatcher in 1997's Tomorrow Never Dies, while Denise Richards wore David Morris gems in 1999's The World Is Not Enough.

David Morris jewels now feature in the travelling exhibition, "Designing 007 - Fifty Years of Bond Style", which opened in 2012 at the Barbican in London.

=== Victoria and Albert Museum ===
David Morris jewellery was selected to be included in the permanent exhibition of the Jewellery Room at the Victoria & Albert Museum.

== See also ==
- David Morris website
