= Pasadena Unified School District =

School district in California, United States

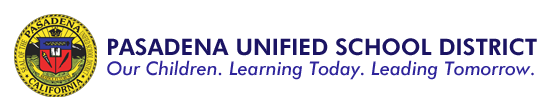

Address
- 351 South Hudson Avenue Pasadena, California, 91101-3507; United States
- Coordinates: 34°8′23″N 118°8′4″W

District information
- Type: Public
- Grades: Pre-K through 12
- Established: 1874; 152 years ago
- President: Jennifer Hall Lee
- Vice-president: Tina Wu Fredericks
- Superintendent: Dr. Elizabeth Blanco
- Asst. superintendent(s): Dr. Cy Chukwumezie; Julianne Reynoso; Eric Sahakian; Marisa Sarian
- Business administrator: Eva Lueck (interim)
- School board: 7 members
- Governing agency: City of Pasadena
- Accreditation: Western Association
- Schools: 13 elementary schools; 3 middle schools; 1 K-8 school; 2 6-12 schools; 2 9-12 schools; 1 continuation high school
- NCES District ID: 0629940

Students and staff
- Students: 18,410 (2016–2017)
- Teachers: 704.98 (FTE) (2016–2017)
- Staff: 1,246.82 (FTE) (2016–2017)
- Student–teacher ratio: 26.11 (2016–2017)
- Athletic conference: CIF Southern Section

Other information
- Areas served: Pasadena, Altadena, Sierra Madre
- Website: www.pusd.us

The Pasadena Unified School District (PUSD) was founded in 1874 and is a unified school district for Pasadena, Sierra Madre, and Altadena, in the U.S. state of California.

As of 2020 PUSD has 14 elementary schools (TK, K-5, K-8), three middle schools (6-8), four high schools (6-12, 9-12), and one continuation school. Enrollment at the beginning of the 2023–2024 academic year was 14,404.

== History ==
=== Founding ===
The Pasadena Unified School District was originally established as the San Pasqual District in 1874, approximately 12 years before the incorporation of the City of Pasadena in 1886. The first school was the home of William T. Clapp on 625 South Orange Grove Avenue.

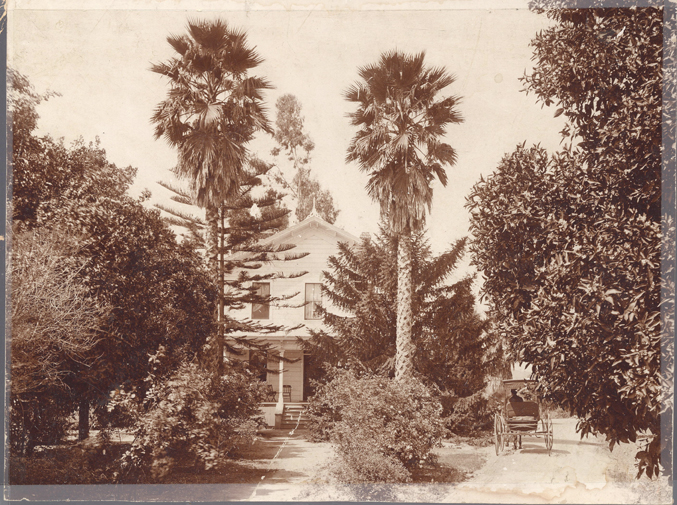
Home of William T. Clapp, first school in Pasadena, circa 1890

In 1878 high school studies were introduced. In 1887 the school moved to the southeast corner of Marengo and Walnut on land donated by Benjamin "Don Benito" Wilson. Wilson Middle School (closed), Don Benito Elementary, and Mount Wilson would be named after him.

In 1891 Pasadena passed the High School Provision Bill, leading to the creation of the first Pasadena High School. Rapid growth at the turn of the century led to the school moving to Hill and Colorado in 1912, which at the time was considered far and rural. This location is currently still occupied by what would become Pasadena City College in 1924. By 1914, the school population reached 1529 students.

=== Early 20th century ===
In 1921 Pasadena's growth rate was so great that the city passed a $750,000 school bond, and four new schools were built, but these were inadequate to keep up with increasing attendance.

From 1924 to 1953 the district adopted the 6-4-4 plan, which organized schools into six years of elementary school, four years of junior high school, and four years of high school/junior college.

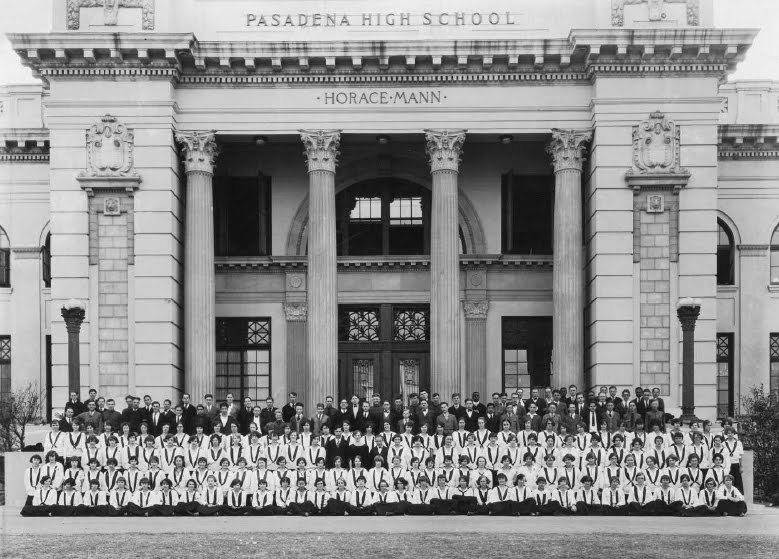
Pasadena High School 1924 Honor Society, Horace Mann Building. Built in 1903, building was torn down in 1934 after the 1933 Long Beach Earthquake. Its modern replacement is the main administration building at Pasadena City College, which shared facilities, and later merged with Pasadena High School from 1924 to 1960.

In 1924, Pasadena voters approved another $3 million bond issue to build additional schools. With this funding, 18 new schools were constructed. Washington Middle School opened to serve the growing African American community in Northwest Pasadena.

In 1925 Marshall was founded as Marshall Junior High School. It was damaged in the 1933 Long Beach Earthquake and rebuilt by 1940.

In 1926 John Muir Technical High School was founded as a new secondary school to serve the growth in Northwest Pasadena and its growing African American population, Altadena, and La Cañada (1920–1963). It was primarily a vocational school.

In 1928 the Pasadena Junior College (Pasadena City College) merged with Pasadena High School, and from 1928 to 1953 served the last two years of high school and first two years of junior college.

In 1938 John Muir Technical High School declined in enrollment and was renamed Pasadena Junior College West Campus. WWII closed this school in 1942 and transferred to the Army. Muir was reestablished as John Muir Junior College in 1946.

=== Post-WWII ===
In 1954 Pasadena voted for a new 6-3-2-2 grade plan for both Pasadena High School and Pasadena Junior College. This merged John Muir and Pasadena Junior Colleges, creating John Muir High School and separating Pasadena High School. Pasadena High School continued to share a campus with Pasadena City College until 1960. The new and current PHS at 2925 E. Sierra Madre Boulevard was completed in 1962.

As a result of the same vote requiring neighboring communities with high schools to fund Pasadena High School and Pasadena Junior College, Temple City left the new Pasadena High School District in 1954.

In 1960 Sierra Madre voted to join the Pasadena Unified School District.

In 1960 La Cañada voted to build a new high school and form its own K-12 school district for its growing population. Between 1920 and 1963 La Cañada families attended Muir for high school.

In 1960, Pasadena High moved to its current location, north of Victory Park, at the corner of Sierra Madre Boulevard and Washington Boulevard.

In 1964 Blair High School was founded in Southwest Pasadena as the last new high school.

These new facilities and schools at Pasadena High School, Blair High, and La Cañada High School began the shift away from Pasadena schools. Many families wanted to attend the new school at Blair or leave for La Cañada, rather than stay at Muir, which was deteriorating. West Pasadena at the time attended McKinley Junior High School, and not Washington Middle School (now Octavia Butler Middle School). Altadena and Eliot Middle School in 1960 was still mostly white.

In 1966 voters approved a new and separate community college district for Pasadena City College to serve Arcadia, La Cañada, Pasadena, San Marino, South Pasadena, and Temple City.

In 1970 Pasadena was ordered to desegregate all of its schools and began forced busing across the district.

In 1973 Marshall Junior High School transitioned to fundamental school covering K-12, until 1976 when K-6 were removed. 6th grade returned in 1985.

In 1989, Audubon Elementary School closes its doors.

In 2006, Allendale Elementary School, Edison Elementary School, Linda Vista Elementary School and Noyes Elementary School closed their doors due to a decrease in student enrollment.

In 2011, Luther Burbank Elementary School and Loma Alta Elementary School closed their doors.

In 2016, Sierra Madre Middle School opened its doors to serve Sierra Madre and Pasadena's Hastings Ranch neighborhood.

In 2019, Cleveland Elementary School closed its doors. Andrew Jackson Elementary is renamed as Mary W Jackson Elementary and Washington Middle School is renamed as Octavia Butler Middle School.

In 2020, Roosevelt Elementary, Jefferson Elementary, Franklin Elementary and Wilson Middle School closed their doors.

In 2025, John Marshall Fundamental School is renamed as Thurgood Marshall Secondary School.

== Elementary schools ==
- Altadena Arts Magnet School - French dual immersion
- Don Benito Fundamental School
- Field Elementary School - Mandarin dual immersion
- Hamilton Elementary School
- Mary W Jackson Elementary School - Spanish dual immersion
- Longfellow Elementary School (TK, K-5)
- Madison Elementary School (TK, K-5)
- McKinley School (K-8)
- Norma Coombs Alternative School
- San Rafael Elementary School - Spanish dual immersion
- Sierra Madre Elementary School
- Washington Accelerated Elementary (TK, K-5)
- Webster Elementary School
- Willard Elementary School (TK, K-5)

== Middle schools ==
- Charles W. Eliot Arts Magnet (6-8)
- Octavia Butler Magnet DL STEAM Middle School (6-8) - formerly Washington Middle School
- Sierra Madre Middle School (6-8)

In 1924 Washington Middle School opened to serve the growing African American community in Northwest Pasadena.

From 1925 to 1973 Marshall was designated as a junior high school before becoming a K-12, 7-12, and later 6-12 school.

From 1926 to 1978 McKinley was the district's third junior high school before transitioning to an elementary school. It closed in 1989 and was reopened in 2002.

In 1931 Eliot Arts Magnet Middle School opened in Altadena.

In 1925 Wilson Junior High School opened. Beginning with the class of 1986, the school included 6th-8th grade, becoming a middle school. In 2020 Wilson closed for declining enrollment. In 2022 the school board voted to move Rose City High School to the former campus.

In 2022, Washington Middle School was renamed as Octavia Butler Middle School after native African-American science fiction writer Octavia Butler.

== High schools ==
- Blair High School (6-12)
- John Muir High School (9-12)
- Thurgood Marshall Secondary School (6-12) — all district
- Pasadena High School (9-12)
- Rose City High School — continuation high school

== Desegregation and privatization ==
In January 1970, as supplemented in March 1970, desegregation busing was ordered in the district after the federal court ordered desegregation of the public schools in Pasadena. This was a result of the city demographics of the time, which resulted in a "de facto" segregation, with a large proportion of the African American population attending schools in the northwest area of the city (which was largely African American), and the white students attending schools in the east and southern parts.

Before the busing plan was implemented in September 1970, the proportion of white students in public schools reflected the proportion of whites in the community (54 percent and 53 percent, respectively). Shortly after busing began, a significant segment of upper- and middle-class families who could afford private schooling pulled their children out of the public school system. The result was a boom of private schooling available in the city, and a reduction of state funding for Pasadena public schools as enrollment was reduced.

By 2004 Pasadena was home to 63 private schools, which educated one-third of all school-aged children in the city, and the proportion of white students in the public schools had fallen to 16 percent. One current (as of 2014) board member, Renatta Cooper, has stated that Pasadena has more private schools per capita than any city its size in the United States.

In 2012, the district was the subject a 90-minute documentary film titled Go Public. The documentary was filmed by 50 crews following the stories of various people in 28 schools for one day, intended to portray the positive and negative realities in a moderate-sized public education system.

== Enrollment ==
In the 2009–2010 school year PUSD served 20,084 students, a drop of approximately 14% since the 2000–2001 school year, when enrollment during the past fifteen years peaked at 23,559 students. As of the 2013–2014 school year, enrollment had dropped to 19,102 students. As of the 2009–2010 school year, PUSD employed 1,154 certificated staff, 1,027 of whom were teachers. In 2009–2010, the district also employed 1,307 classified personnel, 955 of whom were full-time, 352 part-time.

== School closures ==
Since 1989, Pasadena Unified has closed 11 schools as of 2020 due to declining enrollment.

Pasadena's peak enrollment was 23,559 pupils in 2000. As of the 2023–2024 academic year, district enrollment is 14,404. Current projections estimate that enrollment will decline to approximately 10,246 by 2029–2030.

Before 1989

- Audubon Primary School (????)
- Arroyo Garfield Elementary (????)
- Arroyo Seco Elementary (????)
- Lincoln Elementary (1901–1974)
- McKinley Elementary School (1904–1978, reopened 2002 for K-8)

2006

- Allendale Elementary School
- Edison Elementary School
- Linda Vista Elementary School
- Noyes Elementary School

2011

- Burbank Elementary School
- Loma Alta Elementary School

2019

- Cleveland Elementary School

2020

- Franklin Elementary School
- Jefferson Elementary School
- Roosevelt Elementary School
- Woodrow Wilson Middle School

In 2002, McKinley Elementary was reopened as a K-8 school after being closed since 1978.

In 2006, Allendale, Edison, Linda Vista, and Noyes Elementary schools were closed. Edison and Noyes were located in Altadena. The loss of these schools triggered a secession movement from the district.

In 2010, the Pasadena Board of Education voted to close Burbank and Loma Alta Elementary School in the Altadena area.

In 2011, PUSD discussed the possibility of relocating a special-needs preschool and several nonprofit organizations to the Burbank campus.

In 2018, the Pasadena Board of Education voted to close Cleveland Elementary.

In 2019, the Pasadena Board of Education voted 4-3 to close Franklin, Jefferson, and Roosevelt Elementary Schools, and Woodrow Wilson Middle School at the end of the 2019–2020 school year.

As of 2023 the closure of schools, especially Roosevelt Elementary, has resulted in an ongoing lawsuit by the Mexican American Legal Defense and Education Fund (MALDEF).

== Secession movements ==
The Pasadena Unified School District covers the incorporated cities of Pasadena and Sierra Madre, and the unincorporated township of Altadena. Until 1963, La Cañada was also part of PUSD for 9-12.

Issues in Pasadena which have resulted in secession movements have been overcrowding, facility conditions, district finances, academic performance, disciplinary issues, and school closures.

Historic and regional context

Historically and regionally, secession movements were not uncommon. In 1951 San Marino voted to seceded from the South Pasadena-San Marino School District and opened San Marino High School in 1955. South Pasadena itself previously attended Pasadena for high school until the building of South Pasadena High School in 1904.

In 1954, Temple City left Pasadena, after voters approved the transition to a new grade plan and bond measures to fund the new Pasadena High School and Pasadena Junior College.

In 1960, La Cañada voted to establish the La Cañada Unified School District through the secession from Glendale and the opening of La Cañada High School to serve its growing population in 1963. Prior to this, La Cañada students attended John Muir for 9-12 from 1920 to 1963.

In 1991, enclave families in neighboring La Cañada petitioned to secede from Glendale Unified.

In 1992, San Gabriel voted to leave the Alhambra Unified School District and open Gabrielino High School in 1994.

Sierra Madre (1989–1991)

In 1989, Sierra Madre began a secession campaign from PUSD to join neighboring Arcadia Unified for high school, citing lower test scores and increased violence in Pasadena schools, as well as general budget issues during the 1980s. Sierra Madre voted to join PUSD in 1960.

Opponents claimed the secession was racially motivated. Officially, Arcadia Unified remained neutral on the issue of secession.

In 1990, the State Board of Education voted against Sierra Madre leaving.

As of 2023, and in contrast to the rest of the district, Sierra Madre Elementary and Middle schools have by far the highest in area attendance. Pasadena High School and Marshall Fundamental, which the majority of Sierra Madre students feed into, also have high enrollment rates.

Altadena (2006–2011)

In 2006, Altadena began a secession campaign from PUSD following the closure of four schools, including Edison and Noyes Elementary schools, located in Altadena.

In 2010, the Pasadena Board of Education voted to close Burbank and Loma Alta Elementary Schools by the end of 2010–2011. In 2011 the Los Angeles County Office of Education (LACOE) denied Altadena from leaving PUSD.

Since then PUSD has continued to close more schools in Altadena and Northwest Pasadena, including Franklin Elementary in 2020. As of 2020, only three schools, Altadena and Jackson Elementary, and Eliot Middle schools, remain open. Both Jackson and Eliot are currently, or projected to be, under-enrolled.

== Tax and bond measures ==
Measure Y (1997)

Measure Y was a $240 million bond measure that passed in 1997. PUSD later sued contractors for cost overruns.

Measure TT (2008)

Measure TT was a $350 million bond measure that passed in 2008. With 11 school closures from 2006 to 2020, controversy later arose over Measure TT that certain schools had been passed over, in a perceived attempt to force closure through fatal deferred investment.

Measure CC (2010)

Measure CC was a $120 parcel (property) tax increase that failed in 2010. Measure CC was the third tax/bond measure and followed a recession. The failed initiative cost the district over $530,000.

Measures I and J (2018)

Measure I raised the sales tax rate in Pasadena by $.0075 (three-quarters of a cent), or 75-cents for every $100 of sales. Measure J allocated one-third of all revenues from Measure I to protect and strengthen public schools. Measures I and J passed in 2018.

Measure O (2020)

Measure O was a$515 million bond measure that passed in 2020. This was the third, largest, and latest bond measure for Pasadena. Originally the school board and district pursued a larger $850 million bond measure in 2019, but decided wait for a more favorable election cycle during the 2020 presidential election.

In September 2023, only Longfellow, Madison, and Muir were allocated significant funds, totalling $150 million. Each school had received significant Measure TT funding as well. This resulted in accusations against board members favoring their schools over others, or outright attempting to force the closure of certain schools.

As of November 2023, approximately $350-470 million has been allocated to some schools, although there is concern that state finances may not match district spending.

The district and contractors are in discussion of a fourth bond measure to coincide with the 2024 presidential election.

== Governance ==
PUSD is run by a board of education, whose members serve four-year terms. Duties of the board include budgeting, approving expenditures, establishing policy, making employment decisions, approving textbooks and courses of study, and approving academic initiatives.

Starting in 2013, school board members are elected by geographical districts, which replaces a seat number and at-large, with the primary/runoff format, similar to the Pasadena City Council. There are seven geographical districts, Districts 1, 3, 5, and 7, starting with the 2013 elections, while Districts 2, 4, and 6, starting with the 2015 elections, a ballot measure passage by the voters during the 2012 California Primary election.

Voters in the Pasadena Unified School District voted during the June 2018 election to extend the terms of the seven school board members to an additional 19 months, with Districts 2, 4 and 6 effective with the November 2020 election and Districts 1, 3, 5 and 7 with the November 2022 election. The elections are replaced with the plurality format instead of the primary/runoff format effective in November 2020.

As of December 9, 2024, the members of the PUSD Board of Education are Kimberly Kenne (District 1), Jennifer Hall Lee (District 2), Michelle Richardson Bailey (District 3), Scott Harden (District 4), Patrice Marshall McKenzie (District 5), Tina Wu Fredericks (District 6) and Yarma Velázquez (District 7).
