= Pasadena City College =

Community college in Pasadena, California, US

- Former name: Pasadena Junior College (1924–1947)
- Motto: Student Success, Our Top Priority
- Type: Public community college
- Established: 1924
- Budget: $248.1 million
- President: José A. Gómez
- Students: 25,319 (As of 2015)
- Location: Pasadena, California, United States; 34°8′40″N 118°7′5″W
- Colors: Cardinal Red and Gold
- Nickname: Lancer
- Website: pasadena.edu

Pasadena City College (PCC) is a public community college in Pasadena, California. It was founded in 1924 as Pasadena Junior College.

== History ==
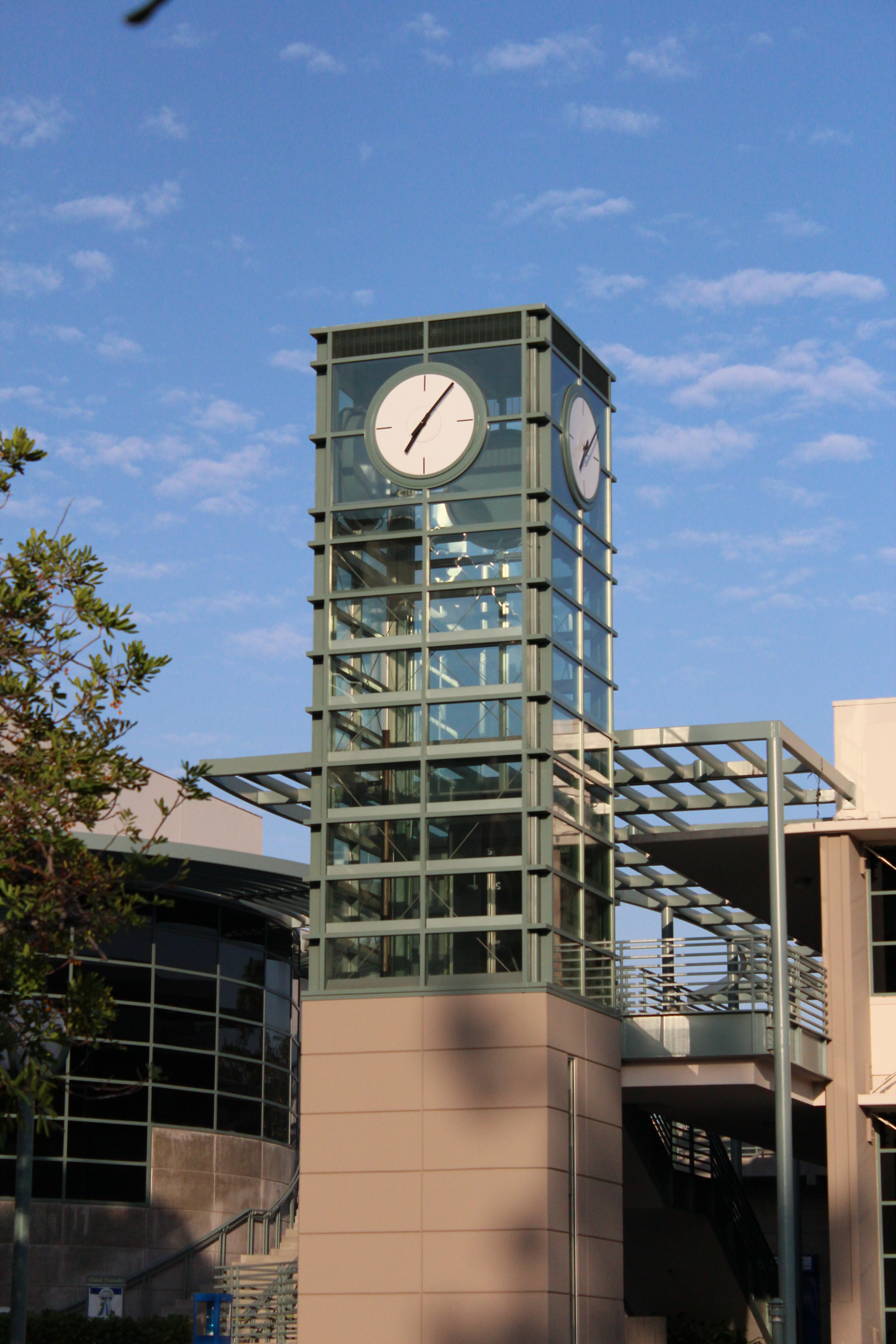
Pasadena City College Clocktower

Pasadena City College was founded in 1924 as Pasadena Junior College. It originally operated on Pasadena High School's campus as an extended learning program of the high school. In 1928, PJC and Pasadena High School formally merged. From 1928 to 1953, it operated as a four-year junior college, combining the last two years of high school with the first two years of college.

In 1946, John Muir College was founded due to PJC's enlarged enrollment. The following year, Pasadena Junior College was renamed Pasadena City College. While at John Muir, Fred Phelps was profiled in Time magazine for preaching against "sins committed on campus by students and teachers ... promiscuous petting ... evil language ... profanity ... cheating ... teachers' filthy jokes in classrooms ... [and] pandering to the lusts of the flesh". Phelps later became leader of the Westboro Baptist Church.

In 1954, John Muir and PCC merged, forming the modern Pasadena City College. Muir and Pasadena High Schools switched from a 11-14 to 9-12 model at this time. In 1960, Pasadena High School left the PCC campus. In 1966, voters approved the creation of the Pasadena Area Junior College District. The name was subsequently changed to the Pasadena Area Community College District. Pasadena City College is accredited by the Accrediting Commission for Community and Junior Colleges of the Western Association of Schools and Colleges, an institutional accrediting body recognized by the Commission on Recognition of Postsecondary Accreditation and the U.S. Department of Education.

The original Pasadena High School library that originally occupied the campus came before the Shatford Library.

On March 20, 2003, on the day the United States launched Operation Iraqi Freedom, many students led by the Students for Social Justice, protested on campus against the war. Protesters went through the administration building requesting students to join their cause. Three students were arrested by campus police. That same year, voters approved a bond measure for about $150 million that improved campus facilities. A significant portion of these funds were earmarked for the construction of a new building to house the college's art and music departments. The Alumni Commons, the Aquatic Center, the Boone Sculpture Garden, and the Galloway Plaza have all replaced what were once campus parking lots. A new fourth floor parking structure (Lot 5) and a new bus parking area were completed in 2005.

In 2007, many services at the school had to relocate pending demolition of their previous facilities. These included the college bookstore, Student Affairs, Associated Students, the student business services, the campus police and the offices of the school newspaper The Courier. A groundbreaking ceremony for the construction of the new Industrial and Technology building, Campus Center and Bookstore took place in October 2007. The Campus Center and Bookstore opened in August 2009. The school is one of the few community colleges with its own observatory, planetarium, and seismograph. Additionally, in 2007 demonstrators from Philadelphia-based Repent America demonstrated on campus, leading to tensions between demonstrators and some students. PCC students, some who were journalism students and staff members of the campus newspaper, PCC Courier, were involved in the May Day melee at MacArthur Park. Later that year, students and faculty held a rally in support of the Jena Six. Some students were beaten and arrested at the MacArthur Park immigrant rights demonstration on May 1, 2007.

During 2012 and 2013, the school became embroiled in conflict between students and faculty and the campus administration. On August 29, 2012, the PCC Board unilaterally cancelled the subsequent six-week winter session. One student was arrested at this board meeting. Organized by a newly formed group called Coalition of Students and Faculty for Student Achievement, a rally during the first week back of the illegitimate new Spring semester kicked off a steady wave of student and faculty activism. Eventually, course sections were cut, student transfers to four-year institutions were delayed, overall full-time student enrollments were reduced, and Proposition 30 monies allotted to the school were jeopardized. According to the California Community Colleges Chancellor's Office, 2012–2013 had the lowest full-time enrollments in 17 years at 20,219; Spring 2013 had the lowest full-time enrollments in 10 years at 9838 students. The Faculty Association filed an unfair labor practice on the District for canceling winter abruptly and won in November 2013. The district filed an appeal to the ruling, thus prolonging the orders to rescind the trimester calendar and return to the status quo while ratcheting up annual 7% compensation to affected employees.

In Spring 2013, in an unprecedented move, the Associated Students unanimously censured the administration and passed a vote of no confidence in the school's president, Mark W. Rocha, and collectively called for his immediate ouster. Separately, a vote among full-time faculty members expressed no confidence in Rocha by a margin of 92 percent to 8 percent. The Academic Faculty Senate also voted, 24–0, no confidence in the president.

The board of trustees remained firm in their support of Rocha, extending his contract another year and giving Rocha a raise. In 2014, however, the faculty maintained its disapproval of the college president's performance as revealed in the faculty-wide evaluation of the PCC President. The negative campus climate has also been a concern with the staff and faculty, which prompted a campus-wide town hall sponsored by the faculty senate. Rocha was named one of Pasadena Weekly's less-than-stellar local "turkey" leaders of 2013. After a failed attempt to find work elsewhere, Rocha announced his retirement on August 7, 2014, but later became the Chancellor of San Francisco City College, where after less than three years he was placed on leave in March 2020, according to the San Francisco Examiner.

In 2014, the Oscar-winning screenplay writer Dustin Lance Black was invited to speak at commencement, but in a controversial move he was subsequently uninvited by PCC Board of Trustees Anthony Fellow, who said, "We just don't want to give PCC a bad name." According to the Los Angeles Times, "School officials pretended that Black was never approved as commencement speaker, when in fact they approved him. They said that his brush with a sex scandal has 'no place in public discussion,' when in fact they discussed it with reporters, students and each other." The college issued an apology, and later re-extended the invitation.

== Administration and governance ==
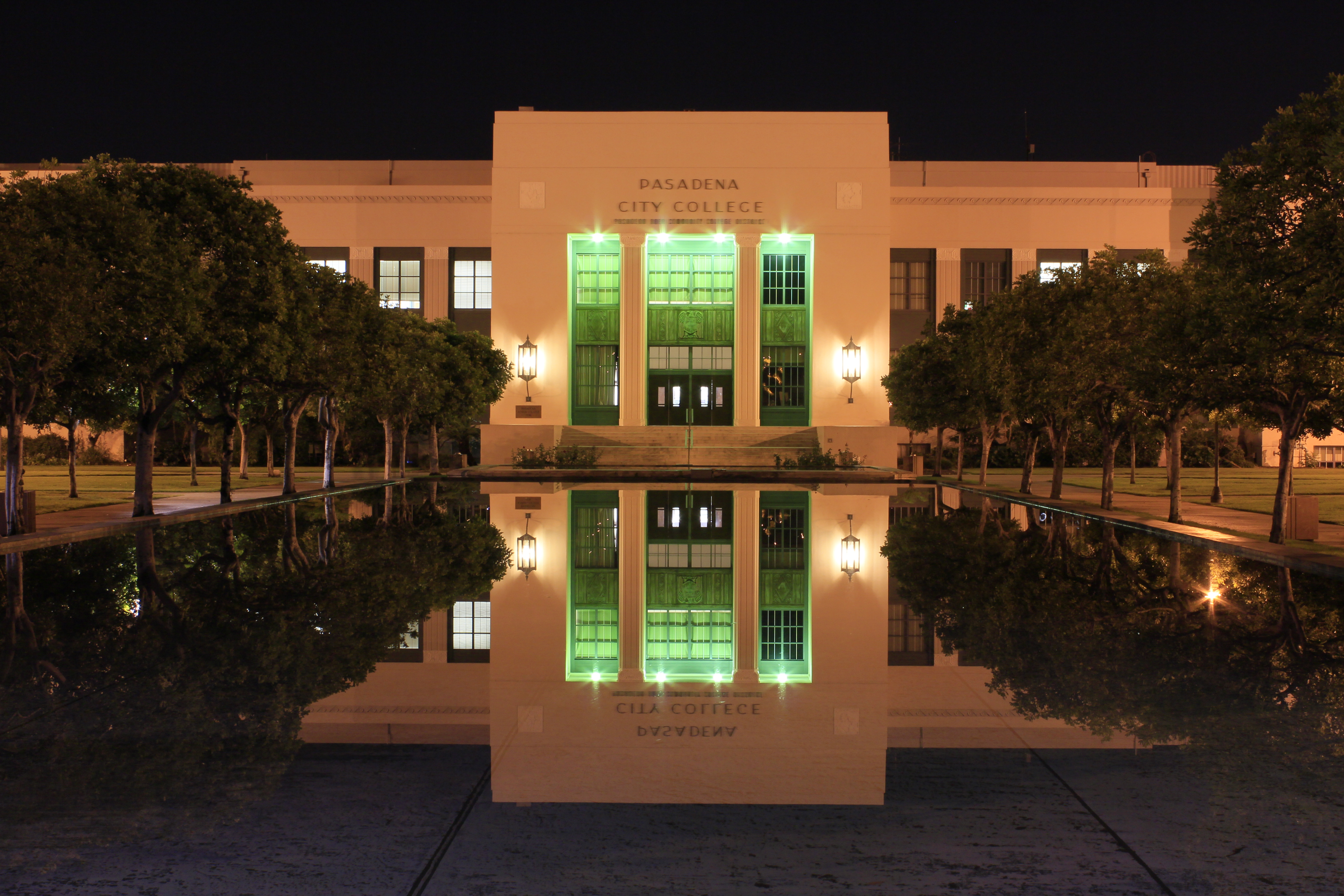
Grand entrance, renamed the Jack Scott Building in 2023, to Pasadena City College

The college is governed by a nine-member board of trustees. Seven members are elected (each of whom represents a geographical section of the Pasadena Area Community College District, which includes Pasadena, Altadena, La Caňada Flintridge, Sierra Madre, South Pasadena, San Marino, Arcadia, Temple City, the western portion of El Monte, the northern portion of Rosemead and the East Pasadena/East San Gabriel unincorporated area); one is a student trustee who is elected by the student body; and one is the sitting college president, who is also the district superintendent. Mark W. Rocha, former West Los Angeles College president, assumed the role of president/superintendent on July 1, 2010, when he was chosen to replace Lisa Sugimoto. His presidency was controversial with some constituents, including the faculty who twice voted "no confidence" in him, and he resigned in the summer of 2014.

Previous presidents/superintendents include Jack Scott (1987–1995), who served as California State Assemblymember from 1996 to 2000 and California State Senator from 2000 to 2008. As of 2009, Scott is Chancellor of the California Community College system; James Kossler, 1995–2007; Paulette Perfumo, who held the position from August 2007 until her abrupt resignation in 2009; and Lisa Sugimoto, who served as acting president through the end of the 2009–2010 academic year.

== Demographics ==
Student body composition as of 2022
Race and ethnicity	Total
Hispanic	50%
Asian	23%
White	15%
Black	4%
Two or more races (Note: Other consists of Multiracial Americans & those who prefer to not say.)	4%
Foreign national	2%
Unknown	2%
Gender Distribution
Male	44%
Female	56%
Age Distribution
Under 18	6%
18-24	62%
25-64	32%

The school attracts students from throughout Southern California, enrolling a large percentage of student from outside the bounds of the Pasadena Area Community College District, which was established in 1966. The district includes the cities of Pasadena, South Pasadena, Altadena, San Marino, Temple City, La Cañada Flintridge, Arcadia, Sierra Madre, and portions of Rosemead and El Monte.

As of 2017, there are approximately 27,324 students enrolled in the school. Full-time enrollment 10,422 and part-time 16,902 students. The student-faculty ratio is 26-to-1. The demographics of the students in 2012: 43.2 percent Hispanic, 26.8 percent Asian or Pacific Islander, 9 percent Caucasian, 3.9 percent African American, and 0.1 percent American Indian. 51.2 percent of the students are female, while 48.3 percent are male.

The in-state tuition and fees for 2017–2018 were $1,348, and out-of-state tuition and fees were $7,004. There is no application fee.

The staff members of the International Student Office assist international students in the application process and support their transition during their time at the school. Before registration, international students are required to pass the English as a Second Language (ESL) and Math placement examinations before being accepted into the school. They are also required to attend counseling to plan for classes. Assistance is available to become familiar with campus resources, i.e., Counseling Office, Library, Learning Assistance Center (LAC), the ESL Center, and Computing Services. It is recommended that all students meet with a counselor to develop a Student Educational Plan (SEP) (L104).

In 2015, there were 425 full-time professors and 1,119 part-time professors. They are represented by the Academic Senate and the Faculty Association. There were 322 classified staff. There were a total of 77 administrators (managers, directors, supervisors, deans, vice-president and president), represented by the Management Association.

== Media ==
The Courier is the official student award-winning newspaper of Pasadena City College. It has been honored with a General Excellence Award by the Journalism Association of Community Colleges. The students were also honored for their work on the campus newspaper.

== Athletics ==
Athletic programs at Pasadena City College include basketball, cross country, swimming, tennis, track and field, volleyball, baseball, softball, football, and soccer. The sports teams are known as the Lancers, and the school colors are cardinal red and gold. Pasadena's teams were known as the Bulldogs prior the school's merger with John Muir College in 1954. Muir's teams were known as the "Mustangs"

The school's baseball team uses the Jackie Robinson Field, located near the Rose Bowl, for practices and home games. Robinson Stadium is named for Jackie and Mack Robinson, both of whom were PCC alumni. The stadium was completed in 1999, after a renovation to move the stadium from a North-West position to an East-West direction. The stadium's surface is SprinTurf, while the track has been converted to an all-weather surface. In addition to the school students, the stadium is used by local students from Marshall Fundamental Secondary School, Pasadena High School, and Blair International Baccalaureate School for some high school home football games due to lack of resources on the respective campus fields. It has been the home of the annual two-day "Bandfest" for the Pasadena Tournament of Roses for many years.

The Pasadena City College women's badminton team won AIAW national intercollegiate championships in 1972 and 1973, topping fields that included previous champions Long Beach State and Arizona State.

== Satellite campuses ==
Pasadena City College has four satellite campuses, the Child Development Center, the Foothill campus, the Rosemead campus, and the Northwest campus at John Muir High School.

The Child Development Center, located one block west of the PCC campus, is a childcare center for children of the school's students.

The Foothill campus (formally known as the Community Education Center), located two miles east of the main campus, is an offsite facility where vocational training, some ESL courses, American Citizenship courses, and the college's high school diploma program take place.

The Rosemead campus was established in the Fall of 2013 in efforts to provide more offerings to students throughout the district.

The Northwest campus at John Muir High School was established in the Spring of 2016 which offers career training programs and offering high school students opportunity in applying for college courses.

Shuttles connect the main (Colorado) campus with the Foothill and Rosemead campuses (see Transportation section below).

== Classes at high schools ==
Pasadena City College offers courses that can be taken at nearby high schools. Courses are also offered at the Armory Center for the Arts in downtown Pasadena.

- Arroyo High School in El Monte
- John Muir High School in Pasadena
- Pasadena High School
- Thurgood Marshall Secondary School in Pasadena
- Blair International Baccalaureate School in Pasadena
- South Pasadena High School
- La Cañada High School in La Cañada Flintridge
- Arcadia High School
- Temple City High School
- San Marino High School

== Notable people ==
Below is a list of Pasadena City College faculty and alumni.

=== Faculty ===
- Edward Feser, professor of philosophy.
- Nicholas Martin, Associate Professor of the French department, is a two-time Olympic gold medalist with the 1952 and 1956 Hungarian water polo teams
- Ben Sakoguchi, artist and art educator
- Hugo Schwyzer, controversial instructor of history and gender studies

=== Alumni ===
- Michael Anthony, bassist and a founding member of Van Halen
- Stan Atkinson, television news reporter and anchor
- Jennifer Batten, guitarist, known for solo work and touring with Jeff Beck and Michael Jackson
- Dustin Lance Black, Oscar-award winning screenwriter, actor and LGBT activist, known for his work in the film Milk and the TV series Big Love.
- Nicholas Brendon, actor (Xander on Buffy the Vampire Slayer)
- Tim Brewster, former head coach, Minnesota Golden Gophers football team
- Jamal Brooks, former NFL linebacker
- Don Burroughs, former NFL player
- Octavia E. Butler, science fiction writer
- Kim Carnes, singer, known for her 1981 hit song "Bette Davis Eyes"
- Vic Carroll, former NFL player
- Giles Cokelet, chemical engineer
- Tommy Cole, award-winning American make-up artist, Mouseketeer, and former actor and singer
- Mike Connelly, former NFL player
- Dennis Cooper, poet and novelist
- Michael Cooper, former Los Angeles Lakers basketball player, Coach of LA Sparks of the WNBA
- John Culver, Queen of the Rose Parade
- Clive Cussler, novelist
- James Deen, pornographic actor
- Michael Dorn, actor, best known as Worf on Star Trek (PCC connection referenced on South Park episode "Fun With Veal")
- Arthur Duncan, tap dancer (attended)
- Jaime Escalante, former Garfield High School (Los Angeles) teacher, work dramatized in Stand and Deliver
- Darrell Evans, major league baseball player
- Judi Evans, actor
- Paul Fussell, literary scholar and social critic, National Book Award winner
- Michelle Hamilton, Playboy playmate
- Armie Hammer, actor from The Social Network
- Jerome Harrison, former NFL running back
- Ed Hervey, Edmonton Eskimos general manager and former CFL All-Star.
- William Holden, Academy Award–winning actor
- Michael Holton, former college basketball player
- William Hung, American Singer, American Idol Participant
- Pierre Koenig, Architect of the Case Study Home No.22 in the Hollywood Hills
- Joyce Kennard, former associate justice of the California Supreme Court
- Quinton Knight, Arena Football League player
- Mike Lansford, former NFL player
- Jack Larson, Playwright and actor ('Jimmy Olsen' on The Adventures of Superman)
- Jane Lillig, actress
- Kenny Loggins, singer and songwriter
- Danella Lucioni, fashion and runway model and actress
- Bob Mackie, fashion designer
- Charles Manson, songwriter, philosopher, and convicted serial killer
- Saladin McCullough, American football player
- Elizabeth McGrath, artist
- Bruce Merrifield, Nobel Prize winner in Chemistry, 1984
- Anthony Miller, former NFL wide receiver
- Charles Mincy, former NFL player
- Carol Merrill, Let's Make a Deal model
- Nate Montana, son of Joe Montana
- Yura Movsisyan, Spartak Moscow player
- James Mtume, Grammy-award winning songwriter, producer, singer and activist
- Dennis Muren, film special effects artist
- Porntip Nakhirunkanok, Miss Universe 1988 representing Thailand
- Nick Nolte, Academy Award nominated actor
- Kemper Nomland, architect
- Jack Parsons, rocket scientist, JPL co-founder, and occultist
- Gerry Pattison, actress
- Fred Phelps, the pastor and leader of the Westboro Baptist Church
- George Reeves, who portrayed Superman in the 1950s TV series The Adventures of Superman
- William Reynolds, actor
- Stan Ridgway, singer, songwriter, composer
- Jackie Robinson, first African American in Major League Baseball, member of the MLB Hall of Fame
- Mack Robinson, Jackie's brother, silver medalist sprinter at the 1936 Olympics as a student from PJC
- David Lee Roth, vocalist of Van Halen
- Betye Saar, artist
- Mike Saxon, former NFL player
- Herman Alfred Schmid, US Air Force Brigadier General
- Rod Sherman, former NFL player
- Larry Shinoda, automobile designer
- Ken Shutt, American sculptor
- John Singleton, film director, well known for his film Boyz n the Hood
- Sirhan Sirhan, Robert F. Kennedy's assassin
- Madylin Sweeten, actress
- Esther Takei Nishio, WWII internee
- Jerry Tarkanian, famed former college basketball coach
- Charles Tuaau, NFL nose tackle
- Alex Van Halen, drummer of Van Halen
- Eddie Van Halen, lead guitar of Van Halen
- DeWayne Walker, college football coach
- Jim Wilks, former NFL player
- Kirby Wilson, NFL football coach
- Verne Winchell, founder of Winchell's Donuts and former chairman of Denny's Restaurants
- Matt Young, major league baseball player
- Brandon Tsay, computer programmer, disarmed a mass shooter in 2023
