= Kate Hansen =

American luger

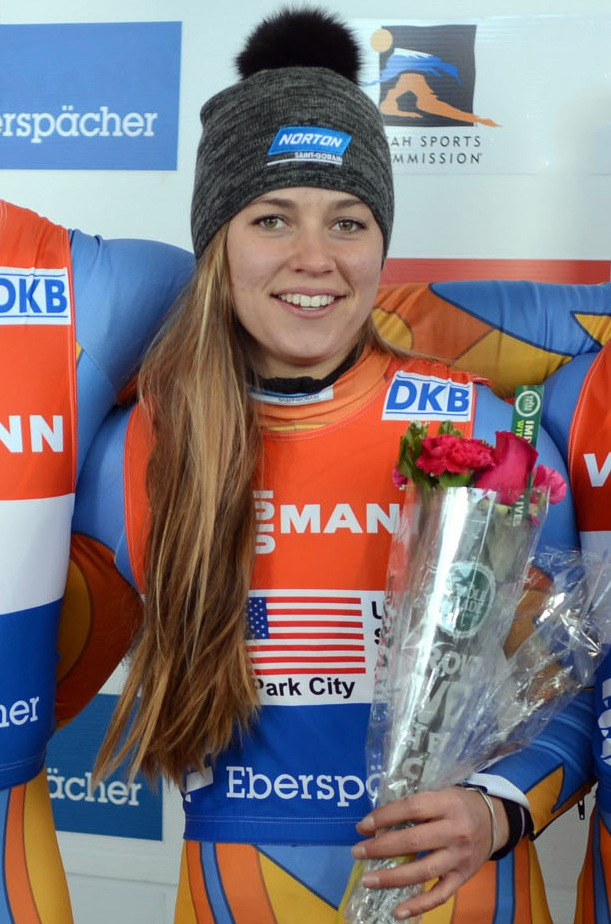
- Hansen in 2013

Personal information
- Born: Kate Elizabeth Hansen; June 9, 1992 (age 33) Burbank, California, U.S.
- Education: Brigham Young University
- Height: 5 ft 7 in (1.70 m)
- Weight: 130 lb (59 kg)

Sport
- Country: United States
- Sport: Luge
- Club: Brigham Young University

Achievements and titles
- Olympic finals: 2014 Sochi

Kate Elizabeth Hansen (born June 9, 1992) is an American luger who has competed since 2003. In 2008, she became the youngest Junior World Champion, at age fifteen.

== Career ==
Hansen has been competing since 2003. She would practice luge in California by riding a skateboard down hills on her back. In 2008, at the age of fifteen, she was the youngest-ever Junior World Champion. She has been on the United States National Team since 2007, and she finished 16th in the women's singles at a World Cup event in Calgary on November 21, 2009. Hansen won the USA Luge National Championship in October 2013 with a broken foot. In January 2014 she was the U.S. Olympic Committee's athlete of the month. She finished 10th place in the Sochi 2014 Olympics.

Competition	Location	Date(s)	Time	Rank	Events
2007–2008 Junior World Cup	Winterberg, Germany	November 23, 2007	1:31.974	3rd (Bronze)	Youth A Women
2007–2008 Junior World Cup	Altenberg, Germany	November 30, 2007	1:24.267	4th	Youth A Women
2007–2008 Junior World Cup	Innsbruck, Austria	December 7, 2007	1:34.128	29th	Youth A Women
2007–2008 Junior World Cup	Königssee, Germany	December 14, 2007	DNF		Youth A Women
2007–2008 Junior World Cup	Park City, USA	January 17, 2008	1:24.503	1st (Gold)	Youth A Women
2007–2008 Junior World Cup	Calgary, Canada	January 24, 2008	1:32.068	1st (Gold)	Youth A Women
2007–2008 Junior World Championship	Lake Placid, USA	February 7, 2008	1:29.105	1st (Gold)	Junior Women
		February 8, 2008	2:18.676	1st (Gold)	Team Competition
2008–2009 Junior World Cup	Winterberg, Germany	January 9, 2009	1:29.464	6th	Junior Women
2008–2009 Junior World Cup	Altenberg, Germany	January 16, 2009	1:28.712	8th	Junior Women
2008–2009 Junior World Cup	Innsbruck, Austria	January 23, 2009	1:22.877	12th	Junior Women
		January 23, 2009	2:11.402	1st (Gold)	Team Competition
2008–2009 Junior World Championship	Nagano, Japan	February 13, 2009	1:30.911	5th	Junior Women
		February 14, 2009	2:26.116	2nd (Silver)	Team Competition
2009–2010 Viessmann World Cup	Calgary, Canada	November 19, 2009	0:47.667	5th	Nation Cup Women
		November 21, 2009	1:35.421	16th	World Cup Women
2009–2010 Viessmann World Cup	Innsbruck, Austria	November 27, 2009	0:40.374	10th	Nation Cup Women
		November 28, 2009	1:20.169	13th	World Cup Women
2009–2010 Viessmann World Cup	Altenberg, Germany	December 4, 2009	0:55.784	24th	Nation Cup Women
2009–2010 Viessmann World Cup	Lillehammer, Norway	December 11, 2009	0:49.752	17th	Nation Cup Women
2009–2010 Junior World Cup	Königssee, Germany	January 15, 2010	DNF		Junior Women
2009–2010 Junior World Cup	Oberhof, Germany	January 23, 2010	2:02.064	29th	Junior Women
2009–2010 Junior World Cup	Winterberg, Germany	February 5, 2010	1:30.677	8th	Junior Women
2009–2010 Junior World Championship	Innsbruck, Austria	January 31, 2010	1:20.246	3rd (Bronze)	Junior Women
		January 31, 2010	2:11.961	3rd (Bronze)	Team Relay
2010–2011 Viessmann World Cup	Park City, USA	December 18, 2010	0:44.260	9th	Nation Cup Women
2010–2011 Junior World Cup	Altenberg, Germany	January 14, 2011	1:27.926	6th	Junior Women
2010–2011 Junior World Cup	Innsbruck, Austria	January 28, 2011	1:21.873	18th	Junior Women
2010–2011 Junior World Championship	Oberhof, Germany	February 5, 2011	1:28.844	6th	Junior Women
		February 6, 2011	2:21.707	3rd (Bronze)	Team Relay
2011–2012 Viessmann World Cup				23rd	
2012–2013 Viessmann World Cup				20th Place	
2013 National Championship			1:29.601	Gold	
2013 FIL World Championship	Whistler, Canada				14th
2013–2014 Viessmann World Cup including Team Relay	Winterberg, Germany			2nd (Silver)	Team Relay
				7th	Women's Singles
2013–2014 Viessmann World Cup including Team Relay	Whistler, Canada			6th Place	
2013–2014 Viessmann World Cup including Team Relay	Park City, Utah			4th Place	
2013–2014 Viessmann World Cup	Lillehammer, Norway		1:23.976	1st (Gold)	Women's Singles
2014 Olympic Games	Sochi, Russia	February 10, 2014	3:22.667	10th Place	Women's Singles
DNS = Did not start			DNF = Did not finish		

=== Sochi 2014 ===
Hansen appeared in the Olympics for the first time at Sochi 2014, where she had a 10th-place finish with a time of 3 minutes 22.667 seconds.

== Personal life ==
Hansen is a Mormon and currently attends Brigham Young University. She took a year off to attend the Olympics. She graduated from La Cañada High School. She resides in La Cañada Flintridge, California.

Hansen is a fan of Beyoncé and listens to her exclusively while warming up for her races. She warms up by dancing, which became her trademark during the Sochi 2014 Olympics. The official Facebook page of Beyonce posted the link to her dance warmup before Hansen's final race in the Sochi 2014 luge event, wishing her luck. The dance apparently came about after she broke her foot and had trouble running to warm up.

Hansen teamed up with Jimmy Kimmel in a prank video which made it seem that a wolf had broken into the apartment where she was staying. A few days later, they admitted to the prank after having scared the media, as well as security.
