= Olivia Smith =

Olivia Smith may refer:

- Olivia Smith (soccer) (born 2004), Canadian soccer player
- Olivia Smith (journalist) (born 1988), American journalist
- Olivia Griffitts (née Smith; born 2001), American soccer player
