= Indra Petersons =

American meteorologist

- Born: Indra Valija Petersons; June 22, 1980 (age 46); Los Angeles, California, U.S.
- Education: University of Arizona (B.S.)
- Years active: 2002–present
- Known for: Television meteorologist
- Spouse: Jake Wood (m. 2013)

Indra Valija Petersons (born June 22, 1980) is an American meteorologist. She formerly worked as the weather anchor for CNN's early morning program "New Day". She is also formerly a meteorologist for KABC-TV in Los Angeles, where she was born and raised. She is currently a meteorologist at NBC News.

== Early life and education ==
Petersons was born Indra Valija Petersons on June 22, 1980, in Los Angeles, California,. Her father is Dr. Viesturs T. Petersons, a neurosurgeon, and mother Silvija Petersons (née Ducis). She has two older sisters, Astra and Brita. She is of Latvian descent. Her first language is Latvian, and she is fluent in English.

Petersons is a 1998 graduate of La Cañada High School in La Cañada Flintridge, California. She then went on to graduate from the University of Arizona with a Bachelor of Science degree in Atmospheric Physics in 2002, also minoring in business, math and physics.

== Career ==
In 2002, Petersons got her start as a meteorologist for KVIA in El Paso, Texas. The same year she went on to KEYT in Santa Barbara, California. In 2003, she became a meteorologist and weather producer and she did reporting on environmental and general assignment issues at KABC in Los Angeles, California. She held the position until she left for CNN's New Day show in 2013, where she did weather segments for CNN Newsroom. She holds an American Meteorological Society Certified Broadcast Meteorologist certificate. She currently works for NBC News.

== Personal life ==
Petersons married Jake Wood of Bettendorf, Iowa, a former United States Marine Corps Scout Sniper and co-founder of Team Rubicon, on August 10, 2013.
