= Mark W. Rocha =

American academic

Mark Rocha
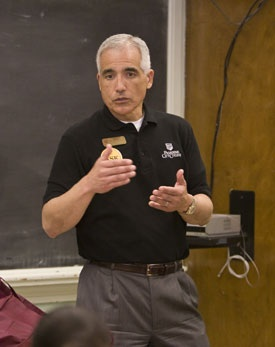
- Mark Rocha in 2010
- Born: August 29, 1953 (age 73); The Bronx, New York
- Education: Villanova University, Bachelors; California State University, Fullerton, Masters; University of Southern California, PhD
- Employer: Cardenio Consulting
- Spouse(s): Nancy Rosenberg (married 2005-2021), Elizabeth Handley (married 1993-2003), Barbara Rocha (married 1980-1990).

Mark William Rocha (born August 29, 1953, in the Bronx, New York) is a former Chancellor of City College of San Francisco and a former Superintendent-President of Pasadena City College. He is an English professor and Fulbright scholar.

== Early life ==
Rocha was raised in the Bronx, New York. He is one of three siblings. His father, William, a native of Colombia, was the first in his family to receive a college degree. Rocha earned his bachelor's degree in English from Villanova University in 1975, his master's degree from California State University, Fullerton, and PhD in English from the University of Southern California. His scholarly work focused on African American and Latino drama and literature, including playwrights August Wilson and Tennessee Williams.

Rocha publicly spoke out against Proposition 187, a 1994 ballot measure intended to restrict undocumented immigrants from access to California's public education system.

== Career ==
Rocha taught for a year in Caracas, Venezuela at the Universidad Simon Bolivar.

Rocha became dean of the College of Arts and Humanities at Humboldt State University in 1996. He was previously a professor and associate dean of Cal State Northridge's School of Humanities. Two years later, in 1998, Rocha became provost of Seton Hall University.

He left Seton Hall for Santiago Canyon College, where he was the college president for the 2000–2001 school year. After he left, Rocha became president of Argosy University/Los Angeles-Orange Campus in September 2001. He later was the Interim Vice President of Academic Affairs at Los Angeles Mission College prior to becoming president of West Los Angeles College in 2006. Rocha was the president of West Los Angeles College until 2010, when he left the school to become the president of Pasadena City College.

Rocha became president of Pasadena City College in July 2010. He replaced Lisa Sugimoto, who was the interim president following the resignation of Paulette Perfumo. In 2012, the Pasadena Area Community College District (PACCD) Board of Trustees extended Rocha's contract as PCC's Superintendent-President through the end of the 2016 academic year.

In March 2013, an ad hoc faculty committee and the Associated Students of PCC placed votes of "no confidence" in Rocha. The faculty committee vote showed 92% displeasure with his management of the college. In April 2013, the Academic Senate voted against him 23–0, with one abstention. The votes followed Rocha's defense of the PACCD Board of Trustees' approval of a 2013–2014 academic calendar without a winter session. The PACCD Board of Trustees offered a statement supporting Rocha following the votes of "no confidence" and extended his contract until 2017.

When the PACCD Board of Trustees removed faculty and staff input on his performance evaluation, in March 2014 the Academic Senate conducted its own evaluation, using the existing college evaluation forms. The majority of respondents answered "nothing" was working at the college, and frequently suggested that Rocha's departure would improve the college.

Rocha announced his retirement from Pasadena City College in August 2014, following a failed attempt to take on the presidency of Kingsborough Community College in New York. He said that it was "time for me to spend more time with my family and return to my passion for teaching and writing". Although the PCC Board of Trustees initially denied the fact, Rocha was paid over $403,000 plus legal fees for his salary through to early 2016, but the settlement given to him by the PCC Board of Trustees was overturned on April 29, 2015, by LA Superior Court Judge Joanne O’Donnell, ruling on the lawsuit filed in August 2014 by Californians Aware. The settlement had been decided in a closed session, in violation of open meeting Brown Act laws. Rocha, who had threatened to sue the board regarding negative comments made about him, was required to return the $403,000 and renegotiate the settlement agreement. In May 2015, Rocha was one of four finalists to become Chancellor of North Orange County Community College District but his name was withdrawn from consideration.

Rocha spent three years working for the Governor's Office of Storm Recovery, a New York state government effort focused on restoration of residences damaged in major storms. He became the chancellor of City College of San Francisco in July 2017. In June 2019, Rocha worked with college and city leaders to secure long-term funding for the Free City program, which offers free tuition for San Francisco residents, but the college remained in a difficult financial situation. In March 2020, the college announced that Rocha had been placed on administrative leave for undisclosed reasons. Soon after that announcement, he resigned as part of a confidential agreement in which he was paid $340,000 and given a year of free health coverage.
