= Norma Coombs Elementary School =

Location
- 2600 Paloma St., Pasadena, California 91107; 34°9′31.32″N 118°5′49.2″W

Information
- Type: Public
- Established: 1972
- Grades: TK-5
- Website: http://www.pusd.us/normacoombs

Norma Coombs Elementary School is located at 2600 Paloma St., Pasadena, California 91107 and is in the Pasadena Unified School District.

== History ==
Norma Coombs Elementary School began as Pasadena Alternative School (PAS), which was a cooperative venture by the University of Massachusetts Amherst and the school district, established to answer the community's desire for a school that offered a more unstructured approach to education. The original PAS was founded in 1972. Instruction began in a single classroom at the Washington Elementary site with about 50 students organized as a K-12 school.

PAS moved several times as its numbers swelled. By September 1975, it was housed at the Washington Junior High School site, which was renamed the Washington Center for Alternative Studies. An Evening High School was also located at the site, although the programs were kept separate.

In 1982, Pasadena Alternative moved to temporary quarters at its current site on Paloma Street, adjacent to the former Hale Elementary School. Hale Elementary was named after noted astronomer George Ellery Hale (1868–1938), who in addition to co-founding the California Institute of Technology in Pasadena, also founded and directed some of the world's greatest observatories, including Mount Wilson Observatory.

In 1996, the school was reconfigured from a K-12 into a K-8 and was renamed Norma Coombs Alternative School in honor of Norma S. Coombs, who died earlier that year. She had served three years as the principal of PAS and was with the Pasadena Unified School District for 36 years, first as a teacher and later becoming a language arts specialist.

== Grade Configuration ==
As of the 2026-2027 school year, Norma Coombs Elementary School (NCES) serves students in Transitional Kindergarten (TK) through 5th grade, with an enrollment of about 420 students total.

External links

- School Website
- Greatschools Entry
- Facebook Page
