= Thurgood Marshall Secondary School =

Public secondary school in Pasadena, California, United States

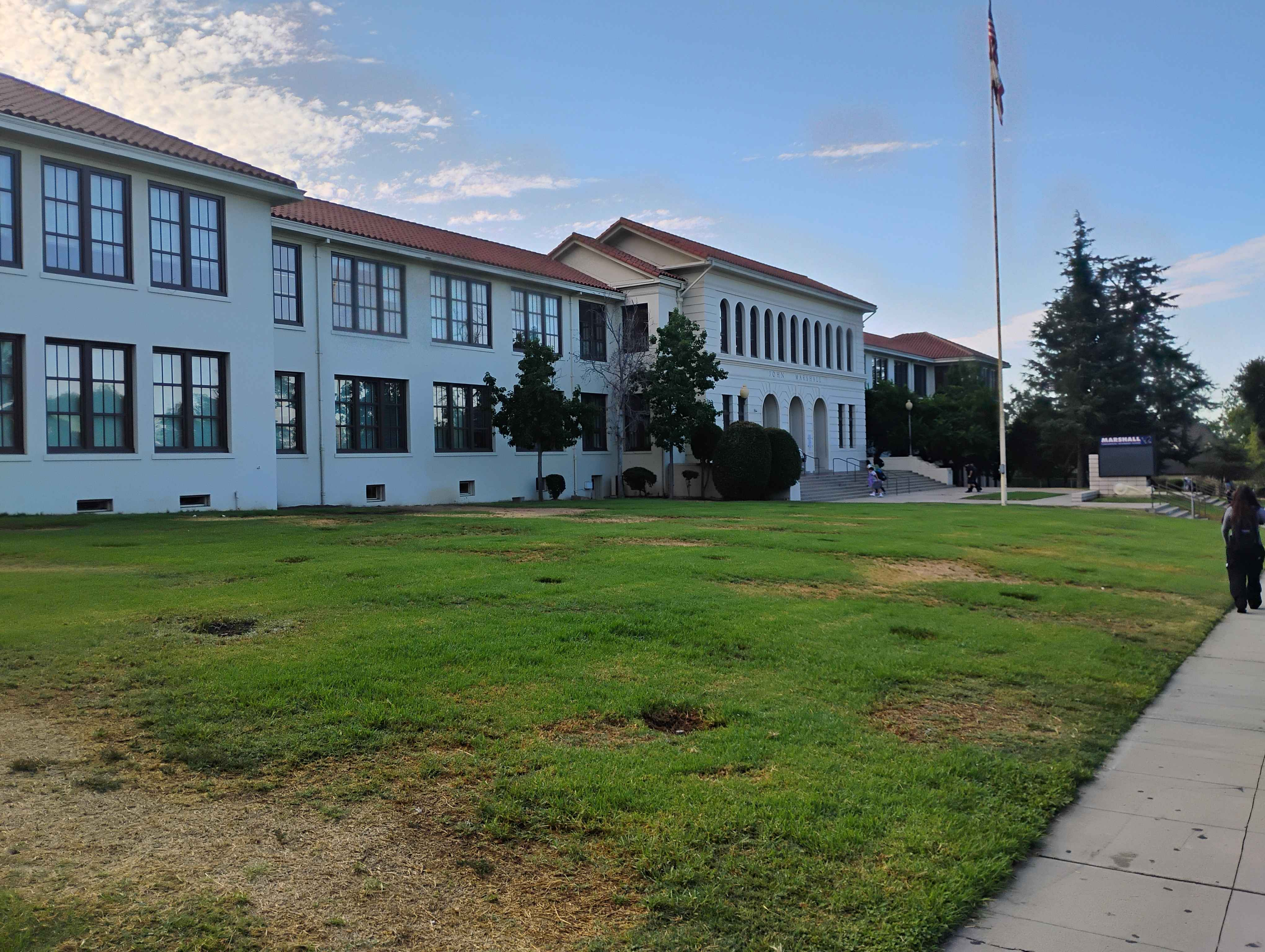
- The front entrance of Thrugood Marshall Secondary School

Location
- 990 North Allen Avenue, Pasadena, California; United States; 34.16316°N 118.1125°W

Information
- Type: Public school, secondary school, high school, middle school
- Motto: Soaring to Success
- Established: 1925 (John Marshall Junior High School); 1973 (John Marshall Fundamental Junior and Senior High School); 1985 (John Marshall Fundamental Secondary School); 2025 (Thurgood Marshall Secondary School)
- School district: Pasadena Unified School District
- Dean: Mary Stevens
- Principal: Lori Touloumian
- Faculty: 77.42 (FTE)
- Grades: 6–12
- Enrollment: 1,987 (2018–19)
- Student to teacher ratio: 21.43:1
- Colors: Red, white, and blue
- Athletics: CIF Southern Section
- Athletics conference: Mission Valley League
- Mascot: Bald eagle
- Newspaper: the Eagle Eye, formerly the Flyer Herald
- Website: marshall.pusd.us

Thurgood Marshall Secondary School (formerly "Marshall Fundamental", often referred to as "Marshall") is a secondary school located in Pasadena, California, United States, at 990 North Allen Avenue, and is part of the Pasadena Unified School District.

== History ==
Construction of Thurgood Marshall Secondary School broke ground in 1924, and the primary building was completed in 1925. The building was severely damaged in the 1933 Long Beach Earthquake, causing extensive reconstruction, not opening again until the 1940 school year. Several expansions occurred in the following decades; in the 1950s (Cafeteria), 1970s (Bungalows—demolished in 2015), 2000s (Science Building/"G" Building) and 2010s (Game Gymnasium/"M" Building).

Marshall was a junior high school for nearly fifty years, from its opening until the 1971–1972 school year, when it was closed briefly. For the 1973–1974 school year, it reopened as a secondary school (K-12). In 1976, grades kindergarten through sixth were moved to other Pasadena campuses Longfellow Elementary and Washington Elementary, but the sixth grade level was reinstated during the 1985–1986 year.

In 2001, the school was used as a set for filming the 2001 movie Max Keeble's Big Move.

In late 2024, the school issued a proposal to the Governing Board of the Pasadena Unified School District for approval in changing its name from "John Marshall Fundamental Secondary School" to "Thurgood Marshall Secondary School." John Marshall, the school's former namesake, was a known slave owner. Thurgood Marshall, the namesake of the proposed name change, was the first African-American Supreme Court Justice. On April 16, 2025, the Governing Board approved the renaming, and Thurgood Marshall Secondary School unveiled and celebrated the name change at a celebration of the school's centennial on May 9, 2025.

On February 7, 2025, students at Thurgood Marshall Secondary School staged a walkout alongside four other nearby high schools.

== Curriculum ==
Marshall offers the following Advanced Placement courses.

- English Language
- English Literature
- Calculus AB
- Calculus BC
- Statistics
- Biology
- Chemistry
- Environmental Science
- Physics
- Human Geography
- World History
- US History
- US Government
- Macroeconomics
- Spanish Language
- Spanish Literature
- Music Theory
- Studio Art 2D, 3D, and Drawing
- Psychology
- Capstone Research
- Capstone Seminar
- Computer Science
- Trigonometry

== Sports ==
The teams are named the Marshall Eagles, after the school's mascot, and their uniforms bear the school's colors of white, blue, and red. Some teams use different colors for away games.

The sports at Marshall include:

- Boys' football
- Cross country
- Girls tennis
- Girls' volleyball
- Girls' soccer
- Boys' soccer
- Girls' basketball
- Boys' basketball
- Track and field
- Swimming
- Boys' tennis
- Baseball
- Softball
- Girls Golf
- Marching band
- Winterguard
- Cheer
- Dance Team
- Wrestling

== Academic performance ==
Jay Mathews, an educator and education reporter for the Washington Post, listed Thurgood Marshall Secondary School as the 130th best high school as of 2007, chiefly due to its vast number of underprivileged students, high graduation rate, and 70% free and reduced lunch program. It was featured on the cover of Newsweek magazine, indicated as one of America's best schools. Marshall was first posted in 2003 as 119th, but fell in the following years to 255 in 2005, and 286 in 2006. It saw a jump in the 2012 school year, rising 156 places, back into the top 10%. Marshall in 2017 was ranked 897 overall in the nation and 152 in California.

As of 2022, Marshall is ranked by U.S. News & World Report as being the 190th-ranked high school in California and the 1,303rd ranked high school in the nation.

== Notable alumni ==
- Tamala Jones, actress, Castle
- Brian Taylor, writer and director, Crank
- Sirhan Sirhan, assassin of Robert F. Kennedy (junior high only)
- Edward Van Halen, musician, Van Halen (junior high only)
- Alex Van Halen, musician, Van Halen (junior high only)
- Lark Voorhies, actress, Saved by the Bell
- Justin Watson, former NFL running back
- Jaleel White, actor, Family Matters
- Dick Railsback, American pole vaulter
- Nahshon Dion, writer and filmmaker
