= La Cañada Unified School District =

School district in California, United States

Address
- 4490 Cornishon Avenue La Cañada Flintridge, California, 91011-3243; United States

District information
- Type: Unified School District
- Grades: TK through 12th
- Established: 1885
- Superintendent: Wendy K. Sinnette
- NCES District ID: 0620130

Other information
- Website: www.lcusd.net

The La Cañada Unified School District is located in the city of La Cañada Flintridge, in Los Angeles County, southern California. It includes the majority of La Cañada Flintridge and some land in the City of Pasadena. The La Cañada Unified School District is a high performing TK-12 public school district which operates three elementary schools, and one combined junior/senior high school. All three elementary schools and middle/high school combined serve approximately 4000 students.

Every one of the schools has been named a California Distinguished School. La Cañada High School and La Cañada Elementary School have been named a National Blue Ribbon School. La Cañada High School 7/8 has been named a 2014 "Schools to Watch - Taking Center Stage" Middle School.

The Governing Board is composed of five members, each elected to serve a four-year term. The past election took place in November 2017, but with the passage of California's Senate Bill 415, it will be effective in November 2020 to coincide with the Los Angeles County supervisors, the California State Senate and Assembly and US House and Senate general election.

On November 5, 2024, voters in the city's Sagebrush neighborhood voted in favor of a ballot measure to transfer the territory from the Glendale Unified School District to the La Cañada Unified School District. The Los Angeles County Office of Education and the California Department of Education are evaluating the passage of the ballot measure before the territory transfer, which is scheduled to take place on July 1, 2026.

== Schools ==
The schools operated by the district are:

- La Cañada High School which is split into two separate schools: 7-8 and 9-12
- La Cañada Elementary School (K-6)
- Palm Crest Elementary School (K-6)
- Paradise Canyon Elementary School (K-6)
