= Olivia Smith (journalist) =

American journalist (born 1988)

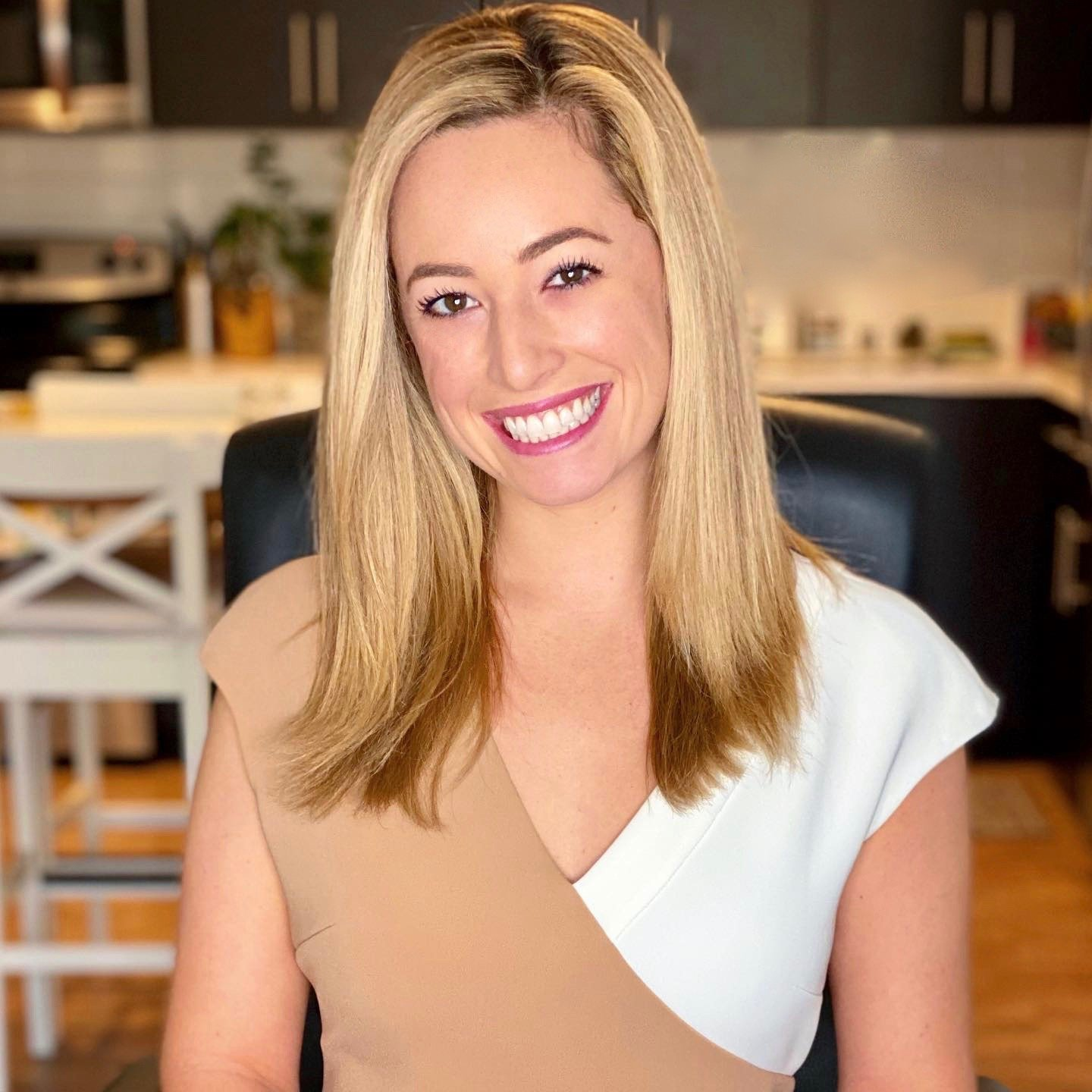
- Smith in 2019
- Born: November 18, 1988 (age 37); La Jolla, California, U.S.
- Education: New York University (BS); Columbia University (MS)
- Occupation: Journalist
- Spouse: Michael P. Murray (m. 2019)
- Children: 2
- Website: oliviasmithonline.com

Olivia Maeve Smith (born 1988) is an American journalist. She has worked for ABC News and Good Morning America, including as a coordinating producer and reporter. She has also worked for KABC-TV Channel 7 in Los Angeles, California, as the executive producer of Next Generation Storytelling, and for the GenAI Content Engineering team at Meta.

== Early life and education ==
Smith was born in La Jolla, California. She was primarily raised in Los Angeles County with her brother, and graduated from La Cañada High School. Her father, Robert Smith, is an estate planning lawyer, and her mother, Jo Ann Rivituso Smith, worked as an associate director on soap operas like Port Charles, Days of Our Lives, and The Young and the Restless, winning a Daytime Emmy Award with Guiding Light in 1985.

In May 2011, Smith graduated from New York University. She worked as a news intern at CNN and at 60 Minutes during her time at NYU.

From 2011 to 2012, Smith attended Columbia University, completing a master's degree in broadcast journalism, and received honors for her reporting. After Columbia, she was awarded a fellowship to rotate through CNN's New York bureau. She received a Fulbright grant in 2012, with which she traveled to Germany to explore media in Berlin.

== Career ==
Smith joined NY1 as a television correspondent in 2012. She then worked for Al Jazeera America.

She joined ABC News in 2015 as a reporter/producer in New York City, where she also worked for Good Morning America. She relocated with the network to Los Angeles in 2016.

Smith became the first executive producer of Next Generation Storytelling for KABC-TV Channel 7 in 2020. She left KABC-TV to join Meta's GenAI Content Engineering team in 2024.

She has been an adjunct professor at the University of Southern California since 2018, where she teaches journalism.

She is the co-founder and CEO of the media training company Media Consulting Coaches. She is also the creator and founder of the blog Get Savvy With Social.

In 2023, Smith created and authored a children's book series called Dog Detectives Jacob and Bricks. The series was inspired by stories she created as a child with her father. Smith is also a published poet with work appearing in the Minetta Review, a distinguished literary journal.

== Honors ==
Smith won her first National Emmy Award in 2016 in the category of News & Documentary for the documentary Dead Horse Bay: New York’s Hidden Treasure Trove of Trash. She won another Emmy Award in 2017 as part of the team with Good Morning America, and was nominated for an Emmy Award in 2018 as a television correspondent in the category of Outstanding News Special for ABC network's special report The Great American Eclipse.

Smith has received multiple journalism awards with her news teams, including Edward R. Murrow Awards and Golden Mike Awards.

In 2024, she was selected as one of 30 leaders for Poynter's highly competitive Leadership Academy for Women in Media.

== Personal life ==
In August 2019, Smith married Michael P. Murray. They have two children.
