= Repent America =

Repent America (RA) is a Christian organization based in Philadelphia, Pennsylvania, in the United States.

== United States of America v. Michael Marcavage ==
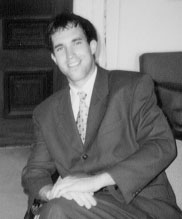
Michael Marcavage of Repent America

A three-judge panel with the United States Court of Appeals for the Third Circuit unanimously overturned the federal convictions of Marcavage, director of RA, for preaching on the public sidewalk near the Liberty Bell, stemming from an arrest in 2007, citing that "the government impermissibly infringed Marcavage's First Amendment right to free speech." Judges Michael Fisher, Thomas Hardiman and Robert Cowen issued a 52-page decision in Marcavage's favor, striking down both of the prosecution's criminal claims against Marcavage, while upholding his constitutionally protected right to preach and speak on the public sidewalks surrounding Independence National Historical Park.

== Philadelphia 11 ==
On October 10, 2004, eleven members of RA were arrested and charged under Pennsylvania's hate crimes law while preaching at OutFest, a gay pride event in Philadelphia. The charges against the members of the group could have resulted in up to 47 years in prison each. All the charges were later dismissed by Common Pleas Court Judge Pamela Dembe as being without merit.

On November 15, 2007, following a legal action brought by RA, the Pennsylvania Commonwealth Court in a 4-to-1 decision struck down amendments to the state's "hate crimes" law, formally known as the Ethnic Intimidation Act, under which the members had been charged in 2004. The published opinion, Marcavage, et al. v. Rendell, et al. , declared that the amendments enacted in 2002, protecting people based upon "actual or perceived . . . ancestry, mental or physical disability, sexual orientation, gender or gender identity," were "unconstitutional and therefore null and void" due to the process in which the law was passed. Pennsylvania Governor Edward Rendell and the state Legislature then appealed the decision to the Supreme Court of Pennsylvania, which ruled in favor of Marcavage, affirming the lower court's ruling that the Legislature acted unlawfully.

== Evolution and intelligent design campaigns ==
Following the judgement against intelligent design supporters in the Kitzmiller v. Dover Area School District trial where a judge decided that it was unconstitutional for Dover Area High School's school board to require teachers to tell students that Darwin's theory of evolution is "not a fact," members of Repent America went door-to-door. The group visited thousands of homes to proselytize and invited residents to a Repent America sponsored creation seminar hosted by Kent Hovind in the Dover Area High School auditorium.
