= La Cañada High School =

Location
- 4463 Oak Grove Drive; La Cañada Flintridge, California 91011; United States; 34.1929°N 118.1796°W

Information
- Type: Public
- Established: 1963
- School district: La Cañada Unified School District
- Principal (9–12): Jason Ito
- Principal (7/8): Jarrett Gold
- Teaching staff: 82.63 (FTE)
- Grades: 7–12
- Enrollment: 1,993 (2022–23)
- Student to teacher ratio: 24.12
- Athletics conference: CIF-SS Rio Hondo League
- Team name: Spartans
- Rivals: San Marino High School South Pasadena High School; St. Francis High School; Temple City High School; Blair International Baccalaureate School Crescenta Valley High School
- Newspaper: The Spartan
- Yearbook: Omega (High School); Alpha (Middle School)
- Colors: Cardinal & Gold
- Website: www.lchsspartans.net

La Cañada High School is a combined junior-senior high school located in La Cañada Flintridge, California, US. It sits at the base of the San Gabriel Mountains, below the Angeles National Forest, in the City of La Cañada Flintridge. The school is adjacent to the Interstate 210 Freeway north of Pasadena's Rose Bowl and south of NASA's Jet Propulsion Laboratory.

== History ==
Established in 1963, La Cañada High School has been named both a California Distinguished School and a National Blue Ribbon School. The U.S. Department of Education has recognized LCHS for “high achievement and exemplary programs”, for rich extracurricular activities, and for strong community support. With an enrollment of 1,993 pupils in grades 7 through 12, La Cañada High has also consistently received the maximum six years of accreditation by the Western Association of Schools and Colleges.

== Academic awards ==
La Cañada High School was named a California Distinguished School by the California Department of Education in 1986 and again in 2003 and 2021.

La Cañada High School has been recognized by the United States Department of Education three times as a National Blue Ribbon School, first in 1992 and 1993, again in 2004, and most recently in 2015.

In 2009, La Cañada High School was ranked 80th out of all public schools in the U.S and 23rd in the state of California by the U.S. News & World Report.

In 2009, La Cañada High achieved a new school record of 20 students admitted as National Merit Scholarship semifinalists.

In 2025, La Cañada High School was ranked 25th in the state of California by the U.S. News & World Report.

== Notable alumni ==
- Timothy Ballard (Class of 1994), American anti-human trafficking activist and author, notably left his organization after accusations of sexual misconduct by multiple employees. The film Sound of Freedom was inspired by his work
- Brian Behlendorf (Class of 1991), computer programmer, developer of the Apache Web server
- Erin Coscarelli (Class of 2002), Host NFL Network Gameday Pick'em
- Michael Cunningham (Class of 1970), author of the 1998 Pulitzer Prize-winning novel The Hours
- Trace Cyrus, (Class of 2007) (dropped out in 2006) member of the band Metro Station, adopted son of Billy Ray Cyrus
- Doug Davidson (Class of 1973), actor (The Young and the Restless).
- Chris D'Elia (Class of 1998), stand-up comic and actor
- Sam Farmer (Class of 1984) sportswriter, Los Angeles Times NFL writer
- Kate Hansen (Class of 2010), 2014 Winter Olympic luger
- Chris Holmes (Class of 1976), lead guitarist W.A.S.P.
- Brianne Howey, (Class of 2007) (moved in 8th grade), actor
- Katherine Propper (Class of 2011), film director (Lost Soulz)
- Phil Joanou (Class of 1979), film director (Rattle and Hum, Three O'Clock High)
- Tommy Kendall (Class of 1984), Professional race car driver (Four-Time Trans Am Series Champion)
- David Lipsky (Class of 2006), golfer
- Collin Morikawa (Class of 2015), golfer
- Taylor Negron (Class of 1975) actor, comedian, painter, and playwright
- Indra Petersons (Class of 1998), a weather anchor for CNN's New Day and CNN Newsroom programs
- Mark Riebling (Class of 1982), author of Wedge: The Secret War Between the FBI and the CIA
- Olivia Smith (journalist), (Class of 2007), Emmy award-winning journalist
- Matt Whisenant (Class of 1988), former Major League Baseball pitcher
