= La Cañada Flintridge, California =

City in California, United States

- City
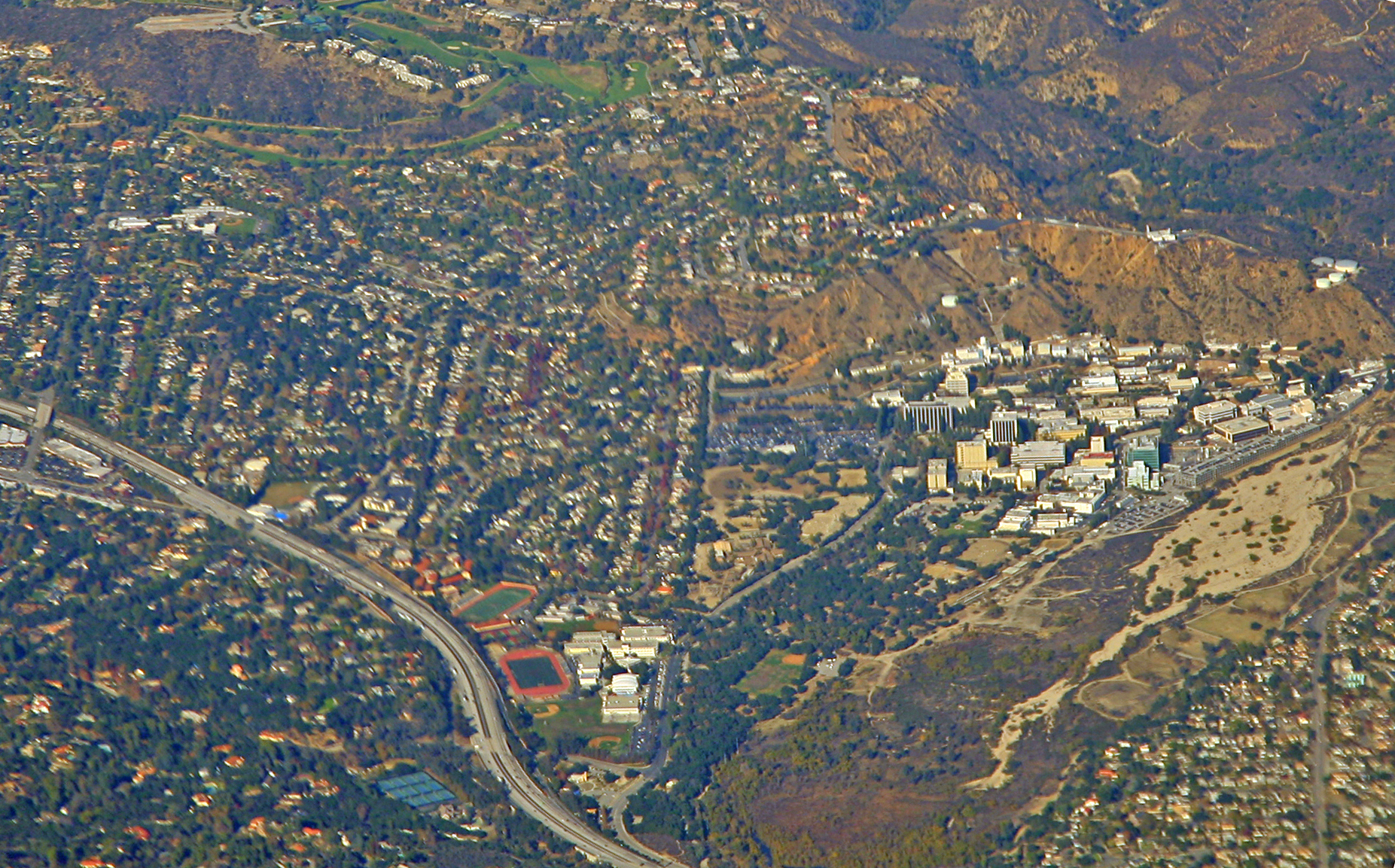
- La Cañada Flintridge, the Foothill Freeway, and, on the right, the Jet Propulsion Laboratory (2014)

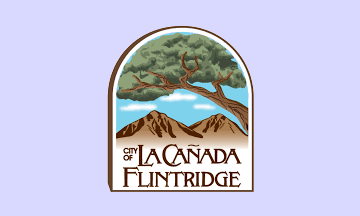
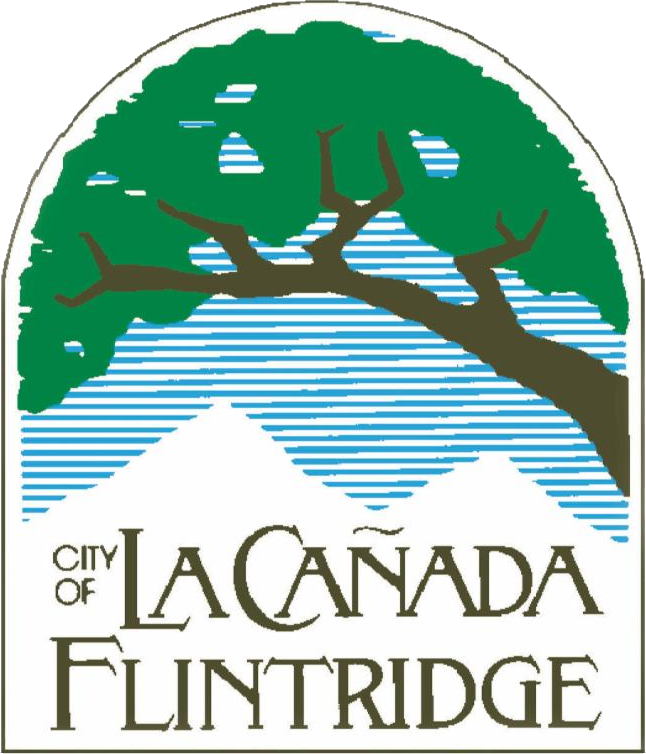
- Flag Seal
- Interactive map of La Cañada Flintridge, California
- Coordinates: 34.207721°N 118.206979°W
- Country: United States
- State: California
- County: Los Angeles
- Incorporated: December 8, 1976
- Named for: Rancho La Cañada; Frank Putnam Flint

Government
  - Type: Council-manager
  - Mayor: Kim Bowman Jr.
  - Mayor Pro Tem: Jeanne Kim Hobson
  - City Council: Keith Eich; Michael T. Davitt; Stephanie Fossan
  - City Manager: Daniel Jordan

Area
  - Total: 8.64 sq mi (22.39 km^{2})
  - Land: 8.63 sq mi (22.35 km^{2})
  - Water: 0.015 sq mi (0.04 km^{2}) 0.20%
- Elevation: 1,188 ft (362 m)

Population (2020)
  - Total: 20,573
  - Density: 2,384.17/sq mi (920.53/km^{2})
- Time zone: UTC−8 (Pacific)
  - Summer (DST): UTC−7 (PDT)
- ZIP Codes: 91011–91012
- Area codes: 818
- FIPS code: 06-39003
- GNIS feature IDs: 1660845, 2411565
- Website: lcf.ca.gov

La Cañada Flintridge /ˌlɑː kənˈjɑːdə/, commonly known as just La Cañada (Spanish for 'The Ravine'), is a city in the foothills of the Verdugo Mountains in Los Angeles County, California, United States. Located in the Crescenta Valley on the western edge of the San Gabriel Valley, it is the site of NASA's Jet Propulsion Laboratory as well as Descanso Gardens.

Before the city's incorporation on December 8, 1976, it consisted of the two distinct communities of La Cañada and Flintridge.

The population was 20,573 at the 2020 census.

== History ==
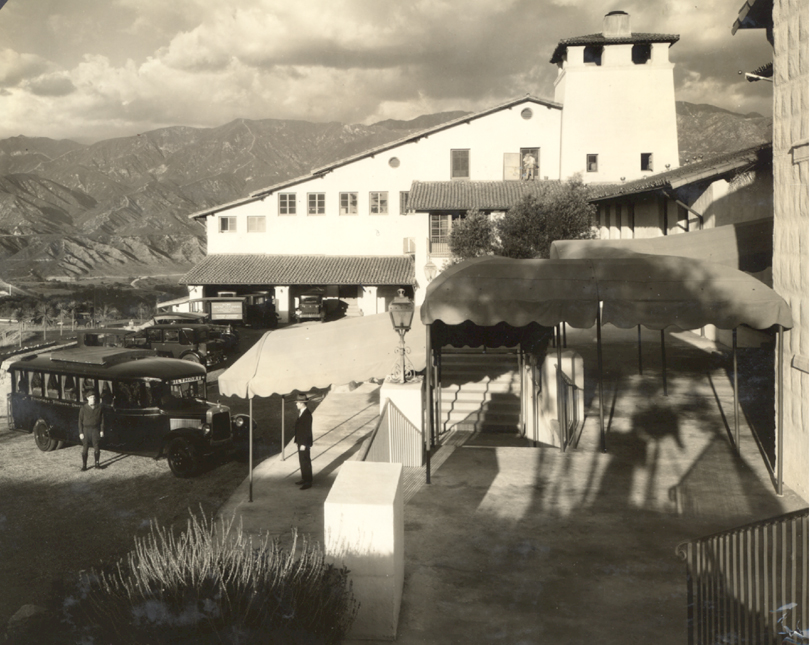
The Flintridge Biltmore Hotel around 1927. Now the Administration Building at the Flintridge Sacred Heart Academy.

The Tongva were first to settle in the area. Local villages included Tejungna (now the city of Tujunga, west of La Cañada) and Hahamongna (now Hahamongna Watershed Park, east of La Cañada), connected by a network of trails, which passed through what is now La Cañada Flintridge. They made extensive use of the live oaks which still are common in La Cañada, as a source of food and shelter. In 1771, the Tongva were enslaved by missionaries at Mission San Gabriel Arcángel, resulting in their other name: Gabrielinos.

=== La Cañada ===
During the Spanish and Mexican eras, the area was known as Rancho La Cañada. La Cañada comes from the Spanish word cañada (pronounced [kaˈɲaða]), meaning 'canyon', 'gorge', or 'ravine'. It is unrelated to the name of the country of Canada.

In 1875, Rancho La Cañada was purchased by two business partners, Jacob Lanterman and Adolphus Williams. Over the next several decades, development was slow, largely owing to the scarcity of sources of water, but some orchards growing stone fruit or oranges were present. Another attraction was the air quality, with a high concentration of tuberculosis sufferers and their families emigrating to convalesce in a place with notably clear air.

=== Flintridge ===
Flintridge was named after its developer, United States senator Frank P. Flint.

Flintridge comprises the southern part of the city, covering the northern flank of the San Rafael Hills, but more generally including most areas south of Foothill Blvd. The eastern part, even north of Foothill Blvd, was also originally considered Flintridge and is still home to the Flintridge Riding Club and Flintridge Preparatory School.

=== Incorporation ===
On December 8, 1976, the cities of Flintridge and La Cañada were merged into a single incorporated city named "La Cañada Flintridge". Reference to the entire city is often shortened to just "La Cañada" or seldom to just "Flintridge". The full city name specifically does not have a hyphen in it, to illustrate unity between the two communities that became one.

== Geography ==
The city is situated in the Crescenta Valley and far western end of the San Gabriel Valley, between the San Gabriel Mountains and Angeles National Forest to the north, and the San Rafael Hills to the south. Most of the city drains southeastward toward the Arroyo Seco area in Pasadena, but the western part of the city (generally west of Alta Canyada Road) drains southward toward Glendale via Verdugo Canyon. Both drainages join the Los Angeles River north of downtown Los Angeles.

La Cañada Flintridge varies in elevation from about 970 feet (300 m) just below Devil's Gate Dam in the Arroyo Seco to about 2,400 feet (730 m) at the highest neighborhood, along the mountain front east of Pickens Canyon, at the upper end of Ocean View Blvd. The city limits extend into the San Gabriel Mountains and reach 3,440 feet (1,050 m) along Mount Lukens Road, which follows the crest line well above the developed city.

In August 2009, the city came under threat by the Station Fire. The city is considered a "very high fire hazard severity zone" because of the local topography at the base of the San Gabriel Mountains and abundance of California Live Oak, despite an aggressive fire safety program. In January 2025, virtually the entire city was evacuated in response to the Eaton Fire, which destroyed many homes in the neighboring community of Altadena. The destruction of chaparral vegetation by wildfire often is followed by mudslides during the following rains, as was observed in 2010, damaging homes adjacent to arroyos at the Northern edge of the city.

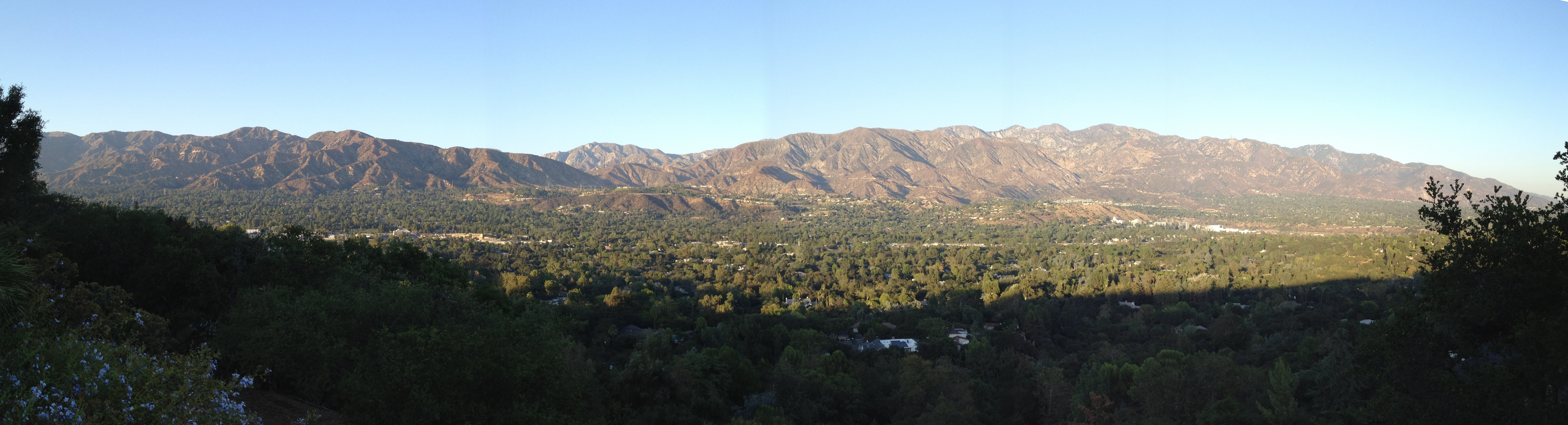
Panoramic view of San Gabriel Mountains from La Cañada Flintridge, 2012

=== Climate ===
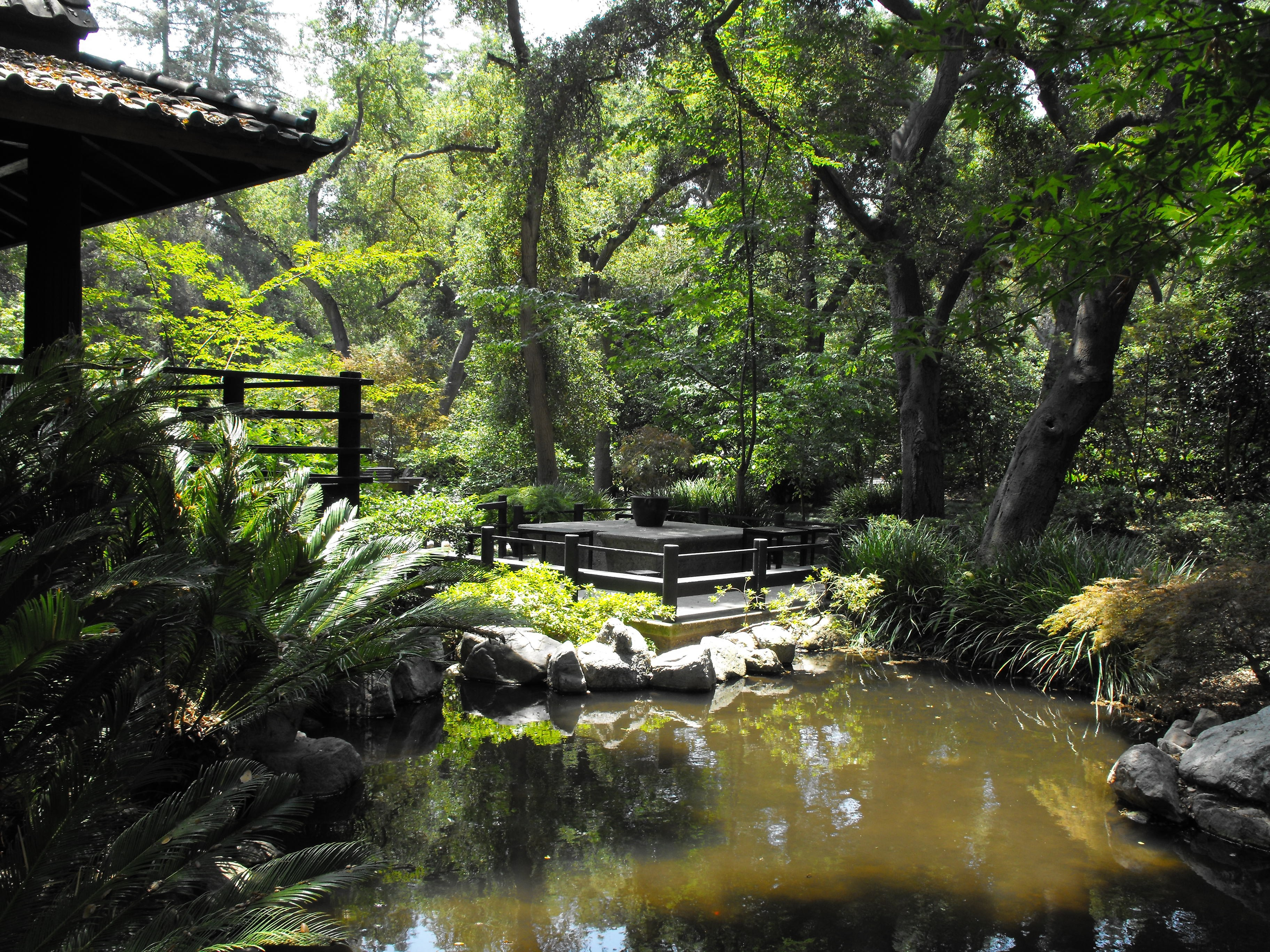
Japanese Garden at Descanso Gardens

The climate of La Cañada Flintridge is typical of a Southern California inland valley, with mild winters and hot summers. Spring often has hazy days, in contrast to the more persistently clear weather of fall. On average, the warmest month is August with high temperatures in the low to mid 90s and lows in the low 70s. December and January are the coolest months with typical highs in the low to mid 60s and lows in the low 40s. Rainfall occurs mostly during winter, averaging about 21 inches annually. Rainfall is rare in summer.

During winter atmospheric river events, storm rainfall totals can be magnified by the orographic effect of the San Gabriel Mountains, producing intense runoff in the foothills where La Cañada is located. In December 1933 and January 1934, the La Cañada Valley was severely flooded in the Crescenta Valley flood (1933 and 1934).

The moderating influence of the ocean (22 miles, 35 km, away) is limited due to the city's location inland from the intervening Santa Monica Mountains, the Verdugo Mountains, and the San Rafael Hills. Consequently, summers are generally hotter and winters often cooler than in coastal parts of metropolitan Los Angeles, if winds are calm or blowing gently offshore. Occasional strong offshore winds, known as the Santa Ana winds, can bring particularly hot air in summer and fall as air from the desert plateaus crosses the mountains and descends, thus warming further by adiabatic heating. Summer and early fall temperatures are substantially cooler if the prevailing wind is persistently onshore. Occasionally during a winter storm, the upper elevations of the city may see trace amounts of snow. Several ski resorts, Mountain High, Mount Baldy, and Mount Waterman, are located about 30 miles (48 km) to the northeast.

Climate data for La Cañada Flintridge (Glendale)
Month	Jan	Feb	Mar	Apr	May	Jun	Jul	Aug	Sep	Oct	Nov	Dec	Year
Record high °F (°C)	93 (34)	92 (33)	96 (36)	105 (41)	102 (39)	110 (43)	110 (43)	107 (42)	110 (43)	108 (42)	98 (37)	93 (34)	110 (43)
Mean daily maximum °F (°C)	63.8 (17.7)	65.4 (18.6)	70.5 (21.4)	76.3 (24.6)	77.2 (25.1)	83.5 (28.6)	89.5 (31.9)	91.2 (32.9)	89.3 (31.8)	83.2 (28.4)	70.5 (21.4)	63.2 (17.3)	77.0 (25.0)
Mean daily minimum °F (°C)	42.3 (5.7)	44.7 (7.1)	46.9 (8.3)	50.2 (10.1)	53.1 (11.7)	57.2 (14.0)	61.3 (16.3)	62.4 (16.9)	59.8 (15.4)	54.8 (12.7)	47.5 (8.6)	41.4 (5.2)	51.8 (11.0)
Record low °F (°C)	23 (−5)	17 (−8)	23 (−5)	34 (1)	37 (3)	41 (5)	45 (7)	48 (9)	44 (7)	37 (3)	29 (−2)	26 (−3)	17 (−8)
Average precipitation inches (mm)	4.48 (114)	5.00 (127)	4.38 (111)	1.22 (31)	0.45 (11)	0.21 (5.3)	0.05 (1.3)	0.21 (5.3)	0.48 (12)	0.65 (17)	1.50 (38)	2.46 (62)	21.09 (534.9)

== Demographics ==
Historical population
Census	Pop.	Note	%±
1960	18,338		—
1970	20,652		12.6%
1980	20,153		−2.4%
1990	19,378		−3.8%
2000	20,318		4.9%
2010	20,246		−0.4%
2020	20,573		1.6%
U.S. Decennial Census; 1850–1870 1880-1890; 1900 1910 1920; 1930 1940 1950; 1960 1970 1980; 1990 2000 2010; 2020

La Cañada Flintridge first appeared as an unincorporated community in the 1970 U.S. census; and as a census-designated place in the 1980 United States census.

=== Racial and ethnic composition ===
La Cañada Flintridge CDP, California – Racial and ethnic composition Note: the US Census treats Hispanic/Latino as an ethnic category. This table excludes Latinos from the racial categories and assigns them to a separate category. Hispanics/Latinos may be of any race.
Race / Ethnicity (NH = Non-Hispanic)	Pop 1980	Pop 1990	Pop 2000	Pop 2010	Pop 2020	% 1980	% 1990	% 2000	% 2010	% 2020
White alone (NH)	18,713	16,008	14,443	13,094	11,127	92.85%	82.61%	71.08%	64.67%	54.09%
Black or African American alone (NH)	52	79	70	101	129	0.26%	0.41%	0.34%	0.50%	0.63%
Native American or Alaska Native alone (NH)	90	25	24	4	24	0.45%	0.13%	0.12%	0.02%	0.12%
Asian alone (NH)	558	2,367	4,167	5,181	6,408	2.77%	12.21%	20.51%	25.59%	31.15%
Native Hawaiian or Pacific Islander alone (NH)	558	2,367	9	4	2	2.77%	12.21%	0.04%	0.02%	0.01%
Other race alone (NH)	21	7	45	50	129	0.10%	0.04%	0.22%	0.25%	0.63%
Mixed race or Multiracial (NH)	x	x	584	545	1,037	x	x	2.87%	2.69%	5.04%
Hispanic or Latino (any race)	719	892	976	1,267	1,717	3.57%	4.60%	4.80%	6.26%	8.35%
Total	20,153	19,378	20,318	20,246	20,573	100.00%	100.00%	100.00%	100.00%	100.00%

== Income and wealth ==
As of 2024, the median household income was reported as $221,451. La Cañada Flintridge is considered among the wealthiest suburbs in America, based on income and home values.

=== 2020 census ===
As of the 2020 census, La Cañada Flintridge had a population of 20,573, around the same level it has been since the 1970 census. The median age was 46.1 years. 23.7% of residents were under the age of 18 and 20.5% were 65 years of age or older. For every 100 females there were 97.2 males, and for every 100 females age 18 and over there were 93.8 males.

99.5% of residents lived in urban areas, while 0.5% lived in rural areas.

There were 6,839 households, of which 39.6% had children under the age of 18 living in them. Of all households, 73.8% were married-couple households, 8.0% were households with a male householder and no spouse or partner present, and 16.4% were households with a female householder and no spouse or partner present. About 12.0% of all households were made up of individuals, and 8.0% had someone living alone who was 65 years of age or older.

There were 7,118 housing units, of which 3.9% were vacant. The homeowner vacancy rate was 0.9% and the rental vacancy rate was 4.0%.

=== 2010 census ===
The 2010 United States census reported that La Cañada Flintridge had a population of 20,246. The population density was 2,341.8 inhabitants per square mile (904.2/km^{2}). The racial makeup of La Cañada Flintridge was 13,959 (68.9%) White (64.7% Non-Hispanic White), 109 (0.5%) African American, 24 (0.1%) Native American, 5,214 (25.8%) Asian, 5 (0.0%) Pacific Islander, 245 (1.2%) from other races, and 690 (3.4%) from two or more races. There were 1,267 people of Hispanic or Latino origin, of any race (6.3%).

The Census reported that 20,219 people (99.9% of the population) lived in households, 21 (0.1%) lived in non-institutionalized group quarters, and 6 (0%) were institutionalized.

There were 6,849 households, out of which 2,873 (41.9%) had children under the age of 18 living in them, 5,029 (73.4%) were opposite-sex married couples living together, 525 (7.7%) had a female householder with no husband present, 214 (3.1%) had a male householder with no wife present. There were 103 (1.5%) unmarried opposite-sex partnerships, and 36 (0.5%) same-sex married couples or partnerships. 924 households (13.5%) were made up of individuals, and 559 (8.2%) had someone living alone who was 65 years of age or older. The average household size was 2.95. There were 5,768 families (84.2% of all households); the average family size was 3.24.

The age distribution of the population was spread out, with 5,315 people (26.3%) under the age of 18, 1,363 people (6.7%) aged 18 to 24, 3,157 people (15.6%) aged 25 to 44, 7,224 people (35.7%) aged 45 to 64, and 3,187 people (15.7%) who were 65 years of age or older. The median age was 45.9 years. For every 100 females there were 94.7 males. For every 100 females age 18 and over, there were 91.1 males.

There were 7,089 housing units at an average density of 820.0 per square mile (316.6/km^{2}), of which 6,120 (89.4%) were owner-occupied, and 729 (10.6%) were occupied by renters. The homeowner vacancy rate was 0.8%; the rental vacancy rate was 5.4%. 18,052 people (89.2% of the population) lived in owner-occupied housing units and 2,167 people (10.7%) lived in rental housing units.

According to the 2010 United States census, La Cañada Flintridge had a median household income of $136,818, with 3.2% of the population living below the federal poverty line.

=== 2000 census ===
As of the 2000 census, there were 20,318 people, 6,823 households, and 5,690 families residing in the city. The population density was 2,348.9 inhabitants per square mile (906.9/km^{2}). There were 6,989 housing units at an average density of 808.0 per square mile (312.0/km^{2}). The racial makeup of the city was 65.53% White, 0.36% Black or African American, 0.18% Native American, 31.57% Asian, 0.04% Pacific Islander, 1.01% from other races, and 3.31% from two or more races. 4.80% of the population was Hispanic or Latino of any race.

There were 6,823 households, out of which 44.1% had children under the age of 18 living with them, 73.7% were married couples living together, 7.3% had a female householder with no husband present, and 16.6% were non-families. 14.4% of all households were made up of individuals, and 8.0% had someone living alone who was 65 years of age or older. The average household size was 2.95 and the average family size was 3.27.

In the city, the population was spread out, with 29.8% under the age of 18, 5.1% from 18 to 24, 20.9% from 25 to 44, 30.2% from 45 to 64, and 14.0% who were 65 years of age or older. The median age was 42 years. For every 100 females there were 93.1 males. For every 100 females age 18 and over, there were 90.5 males.

According to a 2008 estimate, the median income for a household in the city was $140,474, and the median income for a family was $157,511. Males had a median income of $92,760 versus $57,321 for females. The per capita income for the city was $52,838. About 3.6% of families and 4.3% of the population were below the poverty line, including 4.8% of those under age 18 and 5.1% of those age 65 or over.

According to Mapping L.A., English and Korean were the most common ancestries in 2000. Korea and Iran were the most common foreign places of birth. As with neighboring Glendale, many of the people originating from Iran were of Armenian descent, also originating from the former Soviet Union and other regions of Asia.

== Arts and culture ==
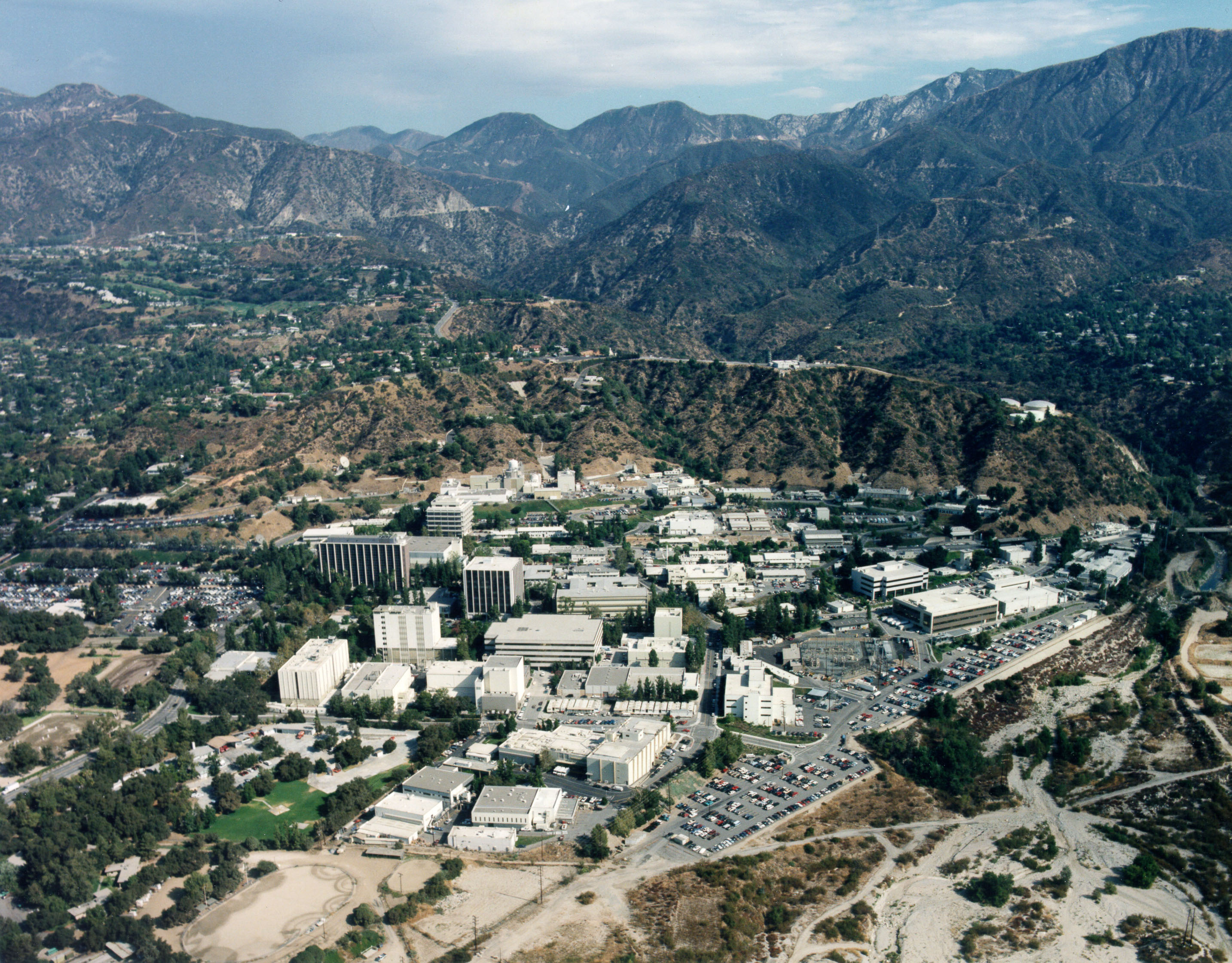
Jet Propulsion Laboratory in the upper Arroyo Seco and San Gabriel foothills, 2006

- NASA's Jet Propulsion Laboratory (JPL) is located on the eastern end of La Cañada Flintridge (the mailing address is Pasadena). It is the primary United States research and development center for the robotic exploration of the Solar System.
- The first Frisbee golf course is located in the Hahamongna Watershed Park (formerly Oak Grove Park), outside of La Cañada Flintridge and across the street from La Cañada High School.
- Descanso Gardens hosts the largest collection of camellia species in North America.
- There are 23 miles of hiking trails throughout the city, maintained by a local Trails Council since 1974. Many are also suitable for horseback riding.
- La Cañada Town Center opened on August 21, 2008. The $60 million shopping center development at the intersection of Foothill Boulevard and Angeles Crest Highway includes retailers and eateries. The former Sport Chalet flagship store and corporate headquarters were the anchor tenants until their bankruptcy and subsequent closure in April 2016. The former corporate offices for Sport Chalet next door became the new city hall, replacing the original built in 1975, while the Sport Chalet store itself is now occupied by Target.
- Lanterman House, museum and local historical archives is one of the early (1915) homes of the area.
- Since 1979, the city has participated in the annual Pasadena Rose Parade, with local volunteers participating in building floats constructed with flowers and botanical materials.

== Government ==
=== Municipal government ===
La Cañada Flintridge is governed by its city council, which has five members, each elected to overlapping four-year terms. Each year, the council selects one of its members to serve as mayor and another to serve as mayor pro-tem for terms of one year. The elections were held on March of odd-numbered years until 2017. Beginning in 2020, the elections are held during the California Primary elections. The council is aided by five commissions and two committees, each with its own area of responsibility. In addition, the council appoints the city manager, city attorney, city treasurer, and all members of its advisory bodies. It also serves as the governing board for the public improvement corporation, the redevelopment agency, the LCF Local Financing Authority, and Sanitation Districts No. 28 and No. 34.

As of August 2026, the current members of the city council are:

- Mayor Jeanne Kim Hobson
- Mayor Pro Tem Stephanie Fossan
- Council Member Quemars Ahmed
- Council Member Kim Bowman
- Council Member Keith Eich

=== County, state, and federal representation ===
In the state senate, La Cañada Flintridge is in the 25th senatorial district, represented by Democrat Sasha Renée Pérez.

In the California State Assembly, La Cañada Flintridge is in the 41st Assembly district, represented by Democrat John Harabedian.

In the United States House of Representatives, La Cañada Flintridge is in California's 28th congressional district, represented by Democrat Judy Chu.

Within Los Angeles County, La Cañada Flintridge is located in the Fifth District, represented on the Los Angeles County Board of Supervisors by Kathryn Barger.

== Education ==
=== Primary and secondary schools ===
==== Public schools ====
The La Cañada Unified School District (LCUSD) serves most of the city, and is ranked as one of the top public school districts in the state that have a single high school. On September 13, 2010, the California Department of Education announced that 2010 California Standards Tests (CSTs) results indicate that the La Cañada Unified School District earned the second highest Academic Performance Index (API) score in the state. The API reflects a district's performance level, based on the results of statewide testing. The district has three public elementary schools that serve grades K-6: La Cañada Elementary, Palm Crest Elementary, and Paradise Canyon Elementary School. The public high school, La Cañada High School, which also serves as a middle school (grades 7–8), is a 1993 and 2004 Blue Ribbon School. The high school was founded in 1963, when students who previously attended John Muir High School in Pasadena changed schools as part of a process of white flight, responding to the racial integration of Pasadena schools during that period.

A small western portion of the city is served by the Glendale Unified School District, with La Cañada Flintridge students attending Mountain Avenue Elementary School, Rosemont Middle School, Anderson W. Clark Magnet High School and Crescenta Valley High School.

==== Private schools ====
Several private schools are located within La Cañada. The private high schools within the city limits are St. Francis High School, Flintridge Sacred Heart Academy, and Flintridge Preparatory School.

The private elementary schools within the city limits are Crestview Preparatory (K-6), The Learning Castle (K-3), La Cañada Preparatory (grades 4–8), and St. Bede (K-8).

Delphi Academy of Los Angeles, a Delphi Academy school, opened in La Cañada Flintridge in 1984. The school left the city when its current campus in Lake View Terrace, Los Angeles opened in 2003.

== Media ==
The city was originally serviced by two newspapers: the La Cañada Valley Sun, a community division of the Los Angeles Times, and the La Cañada Outlook. However, in April 2020, the Los Angeles Times announced it would be shutting down some of its local papers, including the La Cañada Valley Sun due to continuing financial issues that were worsened by the COVID-19 pandemic. Shortly after, Outlook Newspapers Group announced they were buying the Valley Sun and were rebranding their newspaper as the La Cañada Outlook Valley Sun.

== Infrastructure ==
=== Water and utilities ===
The city is served by the Foothill Municipal Water District, formed in 1952 as a union of La Cañada Irrigation District and the water districts of neighboring communities. Previously, most of the area's water came from local springs, but as the population grew, the Foothill MWD arranged to purchase Colorado River and California State Water Project water sourced from the Metropolitan Water District of Southern California, with local sources still providing around 20% of the area's needs.

Sewage is handled by LA County Sanitation District. Sewage is transported to several regional plants, including La Cañada Water Reclamation Plant, a small plant adjacent to La Cañada Country Club. After decades using septic systems for sewage treatment, proposals to install a formal centralized sewage system were put forward in the early 1990s. Installation proceeded in multiple phases over the following decades, with a major expansion to over 1000 residential units beginning in 2004. By 2018, a small remnant minority of property holders with septic systems were being negotiated with to connect to the sewage system.

=== Emergency services ===
The Los Angeles County Sheriff's Department (LASD) provides law enforcement services to La Cañada Flintridge under contract and operates the Crescenta Valley Station in La Crescenta.

The Los Angeles County Fire Department (LACoFD) operates fire stations 19 and 82 in the city. There is an additional station at NASA JPL. Fire stations 11 and 12 in Altadena, and station 63 in La Crescenta-Montrose also serve the city regularly. Emergency transportation is done by Care Ambulance Service. Annual landscaping inspections and "stringent fire-safe building codes" were put in place to mitigate the risk of wildfires, like the 2009 Station Fire.

== Animal services ==
Pasadena Humane is contracted to provide animal services.

== Transportation ==
=== Public transportation ===
The city operates a free shuttle on weekdays along Foothill Boulevard, serving a route including stops at JPL, La Cañada High School, locations in Montrose and others.

=== Foothill Boulevard ===
Foothill Boulevard is the main artery of La Cañada Flintridge, running through the center of the city. The strip of land north and south of Foothill represents the major commercial zone of the city. The road precedes the founding of the city itself, and was originally called Michigan Avenue.

=== 210 Freeway ===
The 210 Freeway opened in 1972, after over ten years of intense local opposition. The building of the freeway required the acquisition and demolition of over 400 homes, and the relocation of La Canada Elementary, the post office, and some businesses.

There are three exits from the 210 Freeway into La Cañada Flintridge, making it a major entry point into the city along with the older 2 Freeway. A soundwall constructed and expanded over decades helps to reduce noise pollution, but the Freeway remains a source of particulate, ozone and other types of air pollution, as is experienced by other cities along the 210 corridor. The local experience with the 210 Freeway led La Cañada Flintridge to also be a source of resistance to the extension of the nearby 710 Freeway, which would have connected to the 210 through Pasadena, likely bringing increased truck traffic if it were built.

=== Angeles Crest Highway ===
La Cañada Flintridge is the southern terminus of the Angeles Crest Highway. It begins at the intersection with Foothill Boulevard and follows a two-mile, 5% grade before entering the San Gabriel Mountains.

In 2008, a big rig carrying 78,000 pounds of onions lost its brakes on the Angeles Crest Highway. To avoid a collision with the Hill Street Café at the intersection with Foothill Boulevard, the rig turned towards a small driveway, sideswiped the Café, crashed into a wall, a garbage bin, a tree and six vehicles before coming to rest in the parking lot. The driver explained that his GPS navigation unit pointed to State Route 2 as the most direct route from the high desert to Los Angeles. A similar incident occurred at roughly the same location in 2009, when a car carrier lost its brakes and, despite three runaway vehicle escape medians in the center islands, caused multiple vehicle accidents that resulted in two fatalities and 12 injuries, three of them critical. Angel Jorge Posca, 58, and his 12-year-old daughter Angelina, both of Palmdale, had just exited the eastbound Foothill Freeway at the Angeles Crest Highway in their red Ford Escort and were starting to turn north on the highway to return to Palmdale when the semi-truck struck their vehicle.

A bill that bans heavy trucks with three or more axles from driving on the Angeles Crest Highway was signed into law by Gov. Arnold Schwarzenegger in 2009. However, accidents have continued to occur at the intersection, with two crashes occurring in one weekend in 2021, one damaging Hill Street Cafe and the other destroying a boutique, resulting in its permanent closure. In 2024, a Toyota Prius traveling southbound on Angeles Crest Highway crashed into six cars parked at the side entrance of the restaurant.

== Notable people ==
- Frances Arnold, Nobel prize winner in Chemistry, 2018
- Angela Bassett, actress
- Carter Bays, television writer, producer, showrunner, novelist
- Chris Buck, animator, film director, screenwriter, voice actor
- Adam Carolla, comedian, radio personality, television host, actor, podcaster and director
- Kevin Costner, actor, producer, director, singer
- Miley Cyrus, actress, singer, and songwriter
- Steve Dahl, radio personality, podcaster
- Chris D'Elia, stand-up comedian, actor
- Rafael Furcal, MLB (Braves, Dodgers and Cardinals) baseball player
- Mark Geragos, criminal defense lawyer
- Donald Glover, actor, musician, writer
- Ollie Johnston, motion picture animator with Disney
- Jennifer Lee, screenwriter and film director with Disney
- David Lipsky, professional golfer
- Josette Maskin, guitarist of Muna
- Victor McLaglen, actor
- Alfred Molina, actor, director, producer, voice actor
- Lizzie Molyneux-Logelin, American screenwriter and television producer, married to Matt Logelin
- Collin Morikawa, professional golfer, PGA Championship winner (2020)
- Haley Joel Osment, actor
- Shohei Ohtani, MLB baseball player with LA Dodgers
- Dennis Prager, conservative author, columnist, and radio talk show host
- Steve Priest, musician
- Hugh Sanders, actor
- Frank Thomas, motion picture animator with Disney
- Michael Tucci, actor, longtime teacher at the city's St. Francis High School
- Vince Vaughn, actor, producer, screenwriter
- Matt Whisenant, professional baseball player and coach of La Cañada High School baseball team

== Sister cities ==
- Villanueva de la Cañada, Spain
