= South Pasadena, California =

City in California, United States

- City
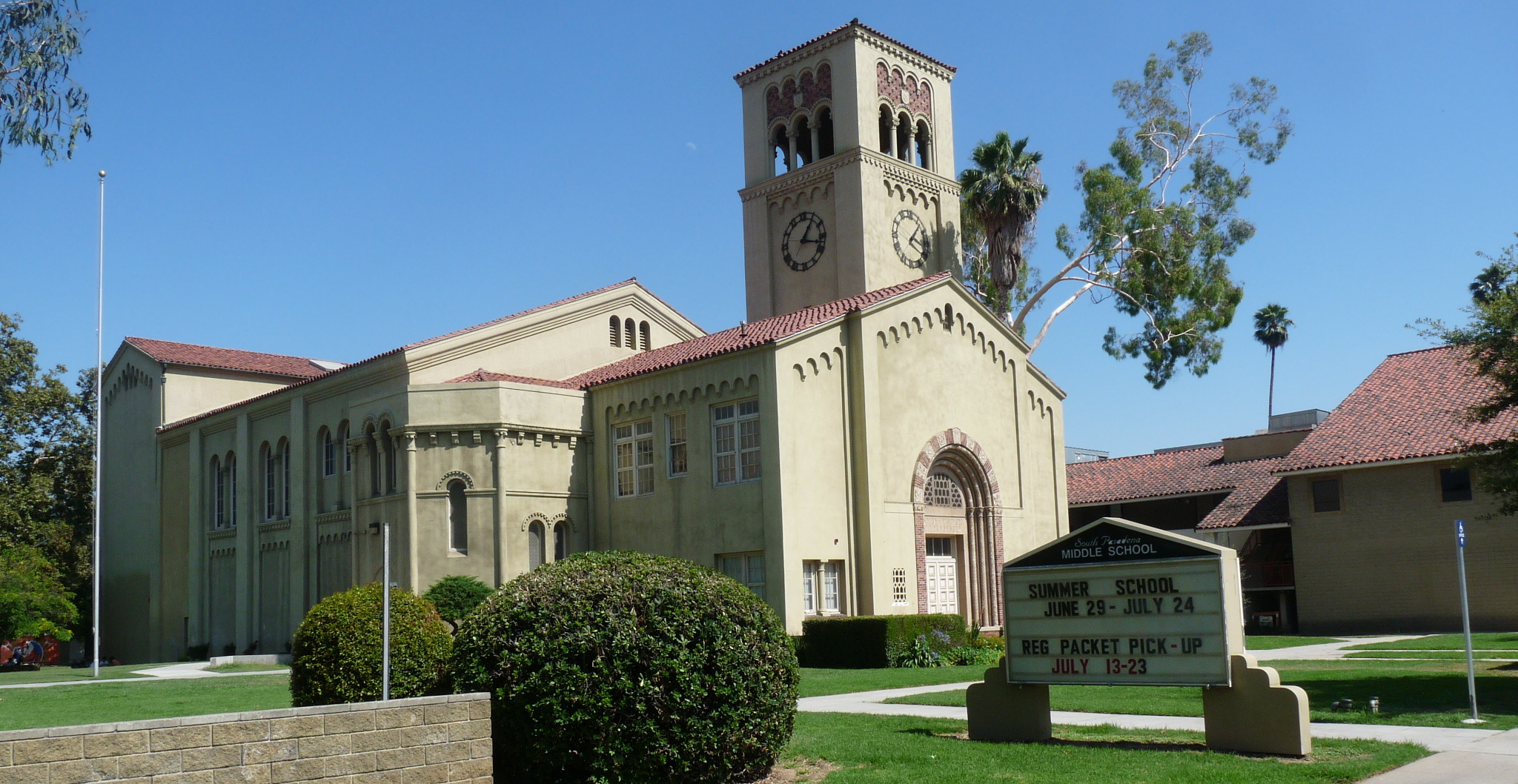
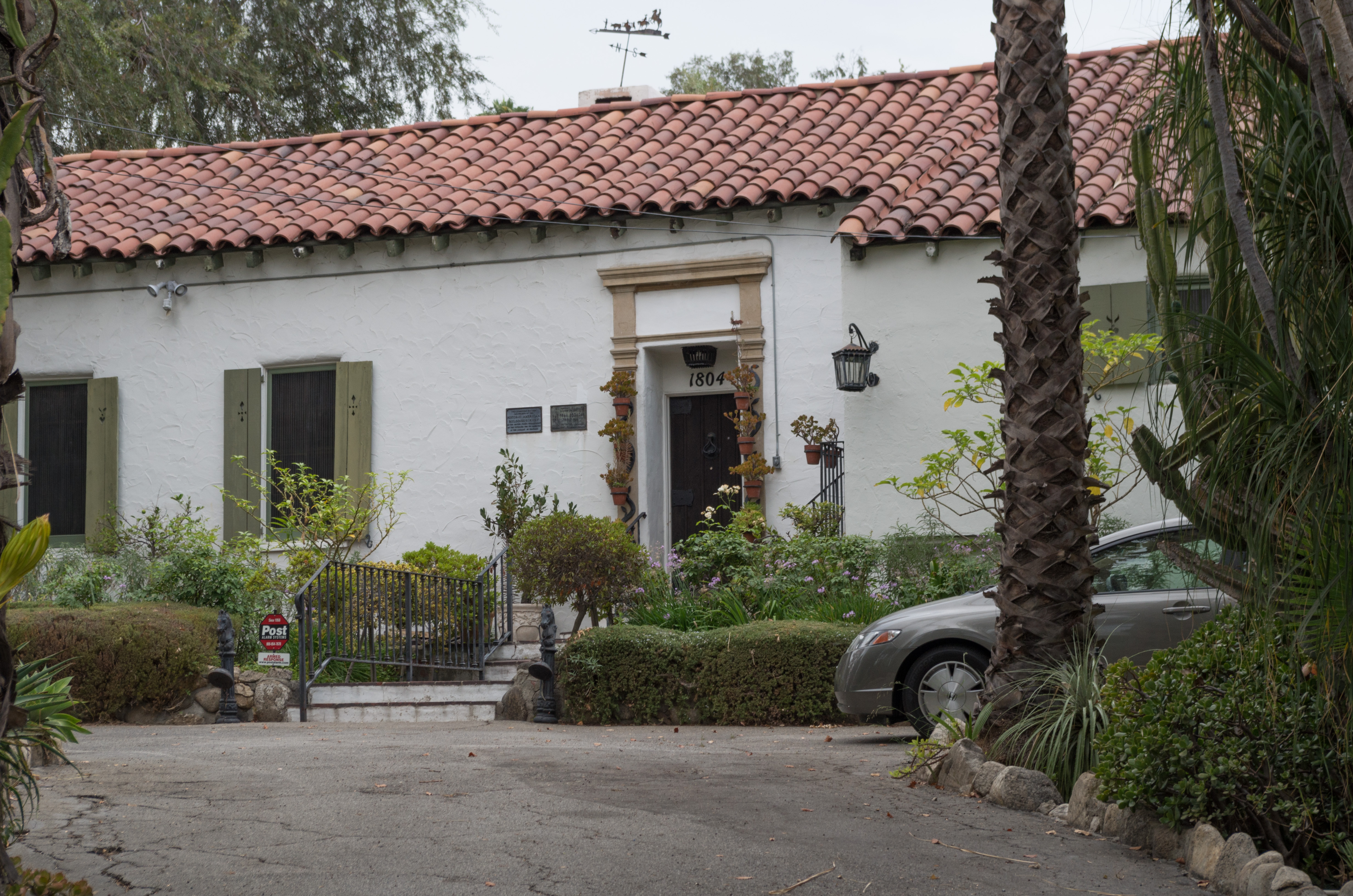
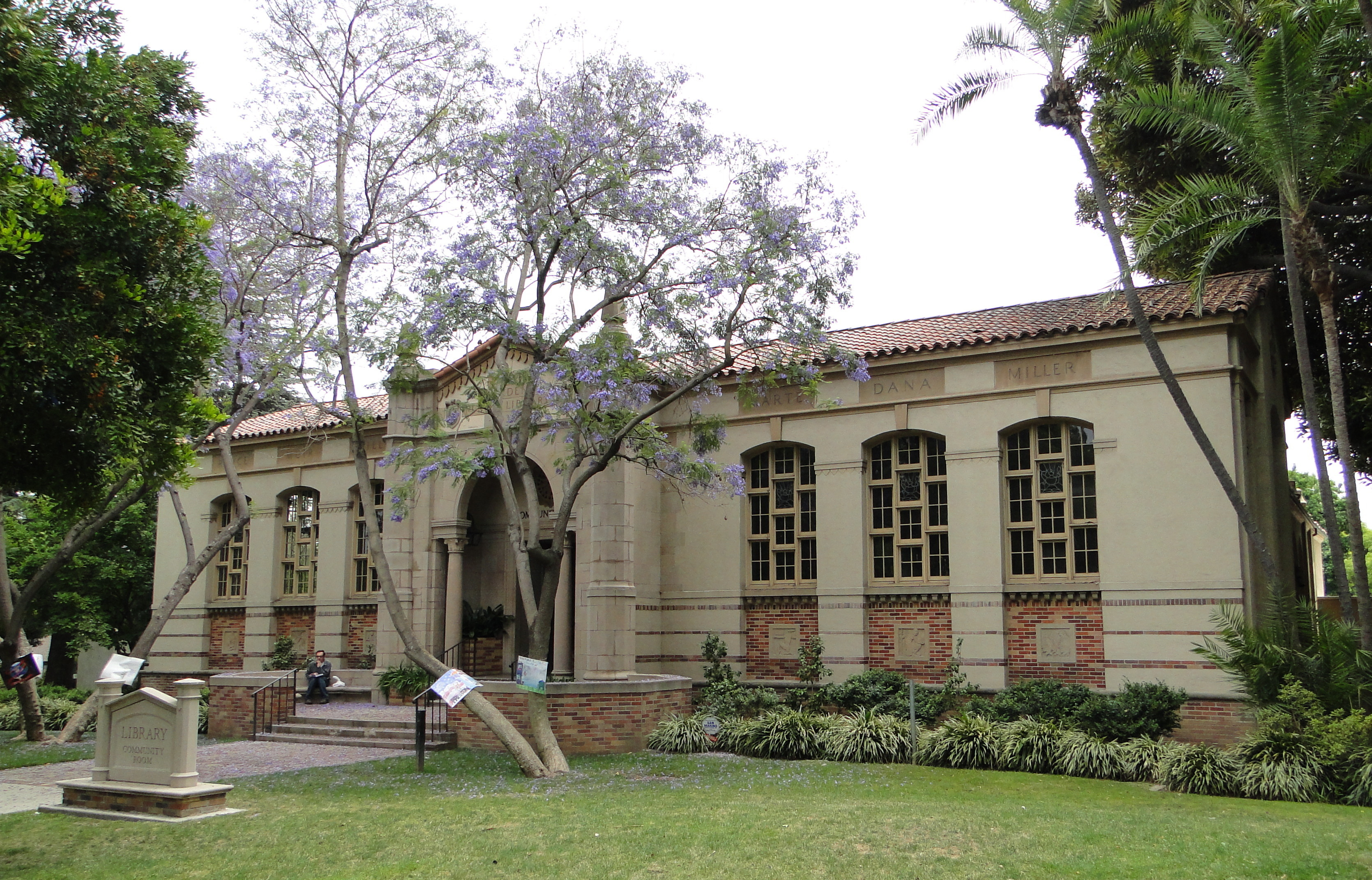
- Clockwise: South Pasadena Middle School; South Pasadena Public Library; Adobe Flores

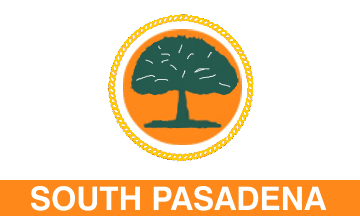
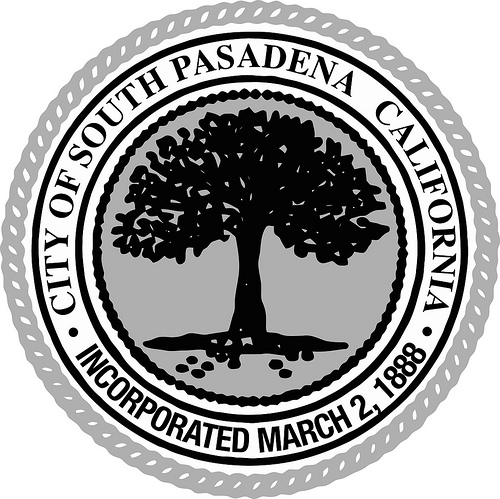
- Flag Seal
- Nickname: City of Trees
- Interactive map of South Pasadena, California
- Location in the United States
- Coordinates: 34°6′58″N 118°9′1″W
- Country: United States
- State: California
- County: Los Angeles
- Incorporated (city): March 2, 1888

Government
  - Type: City Council/City Manager
  - City council: Sheila Rossi (mayor); Omari Ferguson (mayor pro tem); Michael A. Cacciotti; Jon Primuth; Janet Braun
  - City Treasurer: Zhen Tao
  - City Attorney: Rozanne M. Diaz

Area
  - Total: 3.42 sq mi (8.85 km^{2})
  - Land: 3.41 sq mi (8.83 km^{2})
  - Water: 0.012 sq mi (0.03 km^{2}) 0.29%
- Elevation: 659 ft (201 m)

Population (2020)
  - Total: 26,943
  - Density: 7,904/sq mi (3,051.7/km^{2})
- Time zone: UTC-8 (Pacific)
  - Summer (DST): UTC-7 (PDT)
- ZIP code: 91030/91031 (PO box)
- Area code: 323/626
- FIPS code: 06-73220
- GNIS feature IDs: 1661479, 2411940
- Website: www.southpasadenaca.gov

South Pasadena is a city in the San Gabriel Valley of Los Angeles County, California, United States. As of the 2020 census, it had a population of 26,943, up from 25,619 at the 2010 census.

== History ==
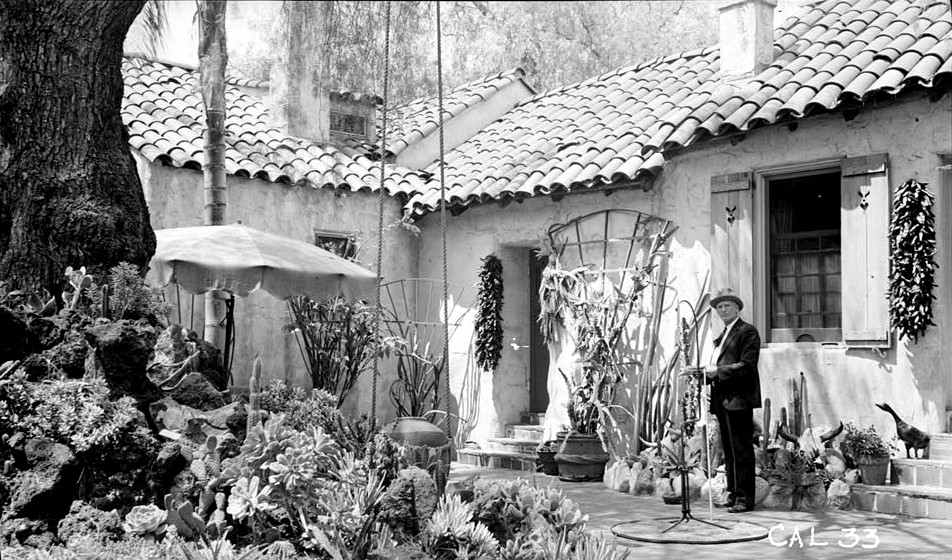
Adobe Flores (1936) is listed on the National Register of Historic Places.

The original inhabitants of the area were members of the Native American Hahamog-na tribe, a branch of the Tongva Nation (part of the Shoshone language group) that occupied the Los Angeles Basin.

In February 1888, members of the southern portion of Pasadena attempted to gain more control over their own property and a vote for incorporation was made. South Pasadena's first mayor was Donald McIntyre Graham. On March 2, 1888, the city of South Pasadena was incorporated with a population slightly over 500 residents, becoming the sixth municipality in Los Angeles County. It was chartered with roughly the same area as the current South Pasadena, about 3.42 square miles (8.9 square kilometers). With the completion of the Pacific Electric Short Line, putting the entire city within easy walking distance of the red car stations, South Pasadena also became one of the first suburbs of Los Angeles. Before the 1950s, South Pasadena was one of the sundown towns in United States that excluded non-White residents and workers in some form or another. The South Pasadena Americanism Center was founded in 1961 by housewives for politically conservative Republicans to find mutual support. It provided reading materials such as anti-communist books. The center was shut down in the 1970s. In the mid-1970s, the city closed several streets connecting to Los Angeles and built a 2-foot-high wall to block off the road Via del Rey. The measure was intended to control traffic and noise but was perceived by some neighbors as an attempt to exclude working class Latinos from the wealthier, more white suburb.

=== Interstate 710 extension ===
South Pasadena and other groups opposed the 710 Freeway Long Beach Freeway (I-710) extension from Alhambra's Valley Blvd. to the Foothill Freeway (I-210) in Pasadena at California Blvd. The proposed route would have run through the center of the city, as well as through neighborhoods in El Sereno and Pasadena. However, this incompletion cuts off a north–south route from the San Gabriel Mountains in the north to Long Beach in the south, as well as connecting the 710 to the 110, 134, and 210 freeways.

On July 19, 1999, United States District Court Judge Dean Pregerson issued a preliminary injunction prohibiting Caltrans from proceeding with the 710 Freeway Project. The financial support for the fight against a major highway project through the city has come mostly from the residents themselves, who pay legal bills incurred by the city in the freeway fight from their general fund (no special taxes are used), making the fight an ongoing local election issue. South Pasadena has been cited five times on the National Trust for Historic Preservation's list of "Most Endangered Places".

Litigation over the 710 extension has run for over 50 years. The City of South Pasadena has filed a federal lawsuit citing failure to protect clean air, the environment and historic properties, and until the California Department of Transportation (Caltrans) completes a comprehensive new environmental study, this will bring additional delays to the 40-year-old project. Caltrans (the California Department of Transportation) proposed a compromise route of boring a tunnel beneath the city. Having purchased hundreds of properties along the proposed right-of-way in the 1960s, Caltrans proposed selling these in order to partially finance the tunnel. The Southern California real estate boom of the early 2000s caused those properties in South Pasadena alone to appreciate to a combined value of over $300 million. State Senator Carol Liu sponsored a bill to compel Caltrans to sell the properties no longer needed for the project. SB-416 also prohibits funds from the sale of surplus properties in the SR 10 corridor from being used to advance or construct any proposed North State Route 710 tunnel. State Assemblyman Chris Holden co-sponsored the bill and remarked after it was signed into law, "…the surface route of the 710 Freeway is not going to happen and everyone knows that and so these properties should then be put back into the community". Caltrans, however, maintains that the freeway extension/connections are needed for the overall benefit of the Southern California public and continues to fight for its completion.

In May 2017, the MTA board voted unanimously to withdraw its support for the 710 tunnel proposal, and to reallocate all funding previously earmarked for it to surface street and other improvements, effectively killing the project for the foreseeable future. Subsequently, Assemblyman Chris Holden, along with State Senator Anthony Portantino, proposed similar bills effectively deleting the uncompleted portion from the Highway grid. Both bills were passed and signed by governor Gavin Newsom and the deletion took effect on January 1, 2024.

== Geography ==
South Pasadena is located at the western end of the San Gabriel Valley, north of El Sereno, east of the Arroyo Seco, a tributary of the Los Angeles River, and south of the separate city of Pasadena, California. Adjacent cities are Los Angeles to the west and south, Pasadena to the north, San Marino to the east, and Alhambra to the southeast. According to the United States Census Bureau, the city's total area of 3.42 square miles (8.9 km^{2}), is virtually all land. South Pasadena is home to a small natural spring, known as Garfias spring, which has been channelized into the Arroyo Seco.

== Demographics ==
Historical population
Census	Pop.	Note	%±
1890	623		—
1900	1,001		60.7%
1910	4,649		364.4%
1920	7,652		64.6%
1930	13,730		79.4%
1940	14,356		4.6%
1950	16,935		18.0%
1960	19,706		16.4%
1970	22,979		16.6%
1980	22,681		−1.3%
1990	23,936		5.5%
2000	24,292		1.5%
2010	25,619		5.5%
2020	26,943		5.2%
U.S. Decennial Census; 1860–1870 1880-1890; 1900 1910 1920; 1930 1940 1950; 1960 1970 1980; 1990 2000 2010; 2020

South Pasadena first appeared as a city in the 1890 U.S. Census which was coextensive South Pasadena Township.

=== Racial and ethnic composition ===
South Pasadena city, California – Racial and ethnic composition Note: the US Census treats Hispanic/Latino as an ethnic category. This table excludes Latinos from the racial categories and assigns them to a separate category. Hispanics/Latinos may be of any race.
Race / Ethnicity (NH = Non-Hispanic)	Pop 1980	Pop 1990	Pop 2000	Pop 2010	Pop 2020	% 1980	% 1990	% 2000	% 2010	% 2020
White alone (NH)	17,274	14,909	12,344	11,179	9,692	76.16%	62.29%	50.82%	43.64%	35.97%
Black or African American alone (NH)	464	705	708	736	638	2.05%	2.95%	2.91%	2.87%	2.37%
Native American or Alaska Native alone (NH)	37	73	31	26	28	0.16%	0.30%	0.13%	0.10%	0.10%
Asian alone (NH)	2,560	5,002	6,424	7,904	9,135	11.29%	20.90%	26.44%	30.85%	33.90%
Native Hawaiian or Pacific Islander alone (NH)	2,560	5,002	17	6	9	11.29%	20.90%	0.07%	0.02%	0.03%
Other race alone (NH)	13	34	86	81	172	0.08%	0.14%	0.35%	0.32%	0.64%
Mixed race or Multiracial (NH)	x	x	779	920	1,685	x	x	3.21%	3.59%	6.25%
Hispanic or Latino (any race)	2,333	3,213	3,903	4,767	5,584	10.29%	13.42%	16.07%	18.61%	20.73%
Total	22,681	23,936	24,292	25,619	26,943	100.00%	100.00%	100.00%	100.00%	100.00%

=== 2020 census ===
As of the 2020 census, South Pasadena had a population of 26,943 and a population density of 7,903.5 inhabitants per square mile (3,051.6/km^{2}). 100.0% of residents lived in urban areas, while 0.0% lived in rural areas.

The age distribution was 23.1% under the age of 18, 6.5% aged 18 to 24, 26.7% aged 25 to 44, 28.1% aged 45 to 64, and 15.6% aged 65 or older. The median age was 41.2 years. For every 100 females, there were 90.4 males, and for every 100 females age 18 and over, there were 86.1 males.

The census reported that 99.5% of the population lived in households, 0.1% lived in non-institutionalized group quarters, and 0.5% were institutionalized.

There were 10,613 households, of which 36.7% had children under the age of 18 living in them. Of all households, 49.7% were married-couple households, 6.3% were cohabiting couple households, 28.8% had a female householder with no spouse or partner present, and 15.2% had a male householder with no spouse or partner present. 26.4% of all households were made up of individuals, and 9.4% had someone living alone who was 65 years of age or older. The average household size was 2.52, and there were 7,079 families (66.7% of all households).

There were 11,146 housing units at an average density of 3,269.6 units per square mile (1,262.4 units/km^{2}), of which 10,613 (95.2%) were occupied. Of occupied units, 44.3% were owner-occupied and 55.7% were renter-occupied. Of all housing units, 4.8% were vacant; the homeowner vacancy rate was 0.6% and the rental vacancy rate was 3.2%.

=== 2023 estimate ===
In 2023, the US Census Bureau estimated that the median household income was $128,105, and the per capita income was $76,583. About 4.1% of families and 5.1% of the population were below the poverty line.

=== 2010 census ===
The 2010 United States census reported that South Pasadena had a population of 25,619. The population density was 7,496.4 inhabitants per square mile (2,894.4/km^{2}). The racial makeup of South Pasadena was 13,922 (54.3%) White (43.6% Non-Hispanic White), 771 (3.0%) African American, 107 (0.4%) Native American, 7,973 (31.1%) Asian, 9 (0.0%) Pacific Islander, 1,422 (5.6%) from other races, and 1,415 (5.5%) from two or more races. There were 4,767 residents of Hispanic or Latino ancestry, of any race (18.6%).

The Census reported that 25,456 people (99.4% of the population) lived in households, 8 (0%) lived in non-institutionalized group quarters, and 155 (0.6%) were institutionalized.

There were 10,467 households, out of which 3,621 (34.6%) had children under the age of 18 living in them, 4,904 (46.9%) were opposite-sex married couples living together, 1,264 (12.1%) had a female householder with no husband present, 451 (4.3%) had a male householder with no wife present. There were 501 (4.8%) unmarried opposite-sex partnerships, and 107 (1.0%) same-sex married couples or partnerships. 3,073 households (29.4%) were made up of individuals, and 802 (7.7%) had someone living alone who was 65 years of age or older. The average household size was 2.43. There were 6,619 families (63.2% of all households); the average family size was 3.06.

There were 5,998 residents (23.4%) under the age of 18, 1,576 (6.2%) aged 18 to 24, 7,431 (29.0%) aged 25 to 44, 7,510 (29.3%) aged 45 to 64, and 3,104 (12.1%) who were 65 years of age or older. The median age was 40.1 years. For every 100 females, there were 90.3 males. For every 100 females age 18 and over, there were 85.5 males.

There were 11,118 housing units at an average density of 3,253.2 units per square mile (1,256.1 units/km^{2}), of which 4,787 (45.7%) were owner-occupied, and 5,680 (54.3%) were occupied by renters. The homeowner vacancy rate was 1.1%; the rental vacancy rate was 6.1%. 13,185 people (51.5% of the population) lived in owner-occupied housing units and 12,271 people (47.9%) lived in rental housing units.

According to the 2010 United States census, South Pasadena had a median household income of $85,058, with 6.7% of the population living below the federal poverty line.

=== History of racial discrimination ===
Before Shelley v. Kraemer was settled in 1948, real estate deeds in South Pasadena forbade selling to Black, Asian, and Mexican buyers in order to preserve the racial character of the population and community values. Non-White individuals must leave the city before dusk unless working as servants or caretakers. The diversity of the city's residents increased in the 1960s after the construction of federally subsidized housing developments. In 2022 the city passed a resolution condemning its history as a sundown town. Racism has become a shadow of its former self, reduced to the occasional stickers, leaflets, and nails placed on driveways.

== Economy ==
=== Top employers ===
According to the city's 2021–2022 Annual Comprehensive Financial Report, the top employers in the city are:

#	Employer	# of employees
1	South Pasadena Care Center	151
2	Trader Joe's No. 18	93
3	Ralphs Grocery Co. #21	92
4	The Vons Companies Inc. Pavilions #2228	92
5	Bristol Farms	88
6	VCA TLC Pasadena Veterinary Specialty and Emergency	73
7	City of Hope South Pasadena	62
8	The Vons Companies Inc. #3075	61
9	Whittier Trust Company	54
10	McDonald's South Pasadena	49

=== Filming ===
Due to its small-town feel and proximity to major film studios, South Pasadena has frequent filming. Scenes from La La Land, Robert Altman's The Player, and Lady Bird have been shot here. The town hosts around 200 shoots per year. South Pasadena is also the location of the house of the character Michael Myers from the film Halloween. Other notable films include Old School, Liar, Liar, Beethoven, Back to the Future, and Teen Wolf.

== Arts and culture ==
South Pasadena calls itself the "City of Trees".

"Mom and Pop" merchants populate the business district, and the Mission West area is a part of the original U.S. Route 66. Of historical relevance is The Fair Oaks Pharmacy and Soda Fountain; also the Rialto Theater in downtown South Pasadena is a unique blend of Spanish Baroque and Egyptian stylings and was built in 1925. It is one of the last remaining single screen cinemas in the country. The Rialto was added to the National Register of Historic Places in 1978, having narrowly missed being torn down that year. It went out of business on August 19, 2007, because of low profits.

The Farmer's Market has become a tradition in the historic Mission-West District of South Pasadena. On the first Saturday of December every year, South Pasadena Booster Club hosts an annual 5K/10K run around South Pasadena known as the "Tiger Run", after the SPHS mascot. Racers from kindergarten to age 80 are invited to participate, including a wheelchair event. The 5K is run on flat sidewalks and roads around town, but the 10K (6.2 miles) includes some difficult hills. There is also a 300-meter children's run for kids 10 and under.

== Parks and recreation ==
There are a few unchannelized portions of the Arroyo Seco south of Devil’s Gate Dam. These areas are just north and south of the Rose Bowl, and host some small populations of duck, fish, and frogs.

There are five parks located within the City of South Pasadena that offer the community family recreation and activities. These are Garfield Park, Eddie Park, Library Park, Orange Grove Park and War Memorial Park.

== Government ==
=== Local government ===
South Pasadena's City Council previously was elected at-large, composed of five members, the mayor chosen from among the City Council members.

Effective November 2018, City Council members are elected by geographical district. Districts 4 and 5 (east of Fair Oaks Avenue) held elections in November 2018. Districts 1, 2 and 3 (west of Fair Oaks Avenue) held elections in November 2020.

The city switched its City Council elections from November of odd-numbered years to November of even-numbered years effective November 2018. Also, the South Pasadena Unified School District holds its Board of Education elections in November of even-numbered years effective November 2018.

The fiscal year 2019-2020 general fund budget for the town was $28.3 million.

=== List of mayors ===
This is a list of South Pasadena mayors by year.

- 1964–1966: Burton E. Jones
- 1966–1968: Lila Cox
- 1968–1972; 1976–1977: William C. Harker
- 1983–1984: Alva Lee Arnold
- 1990–1991; 1994–1995: Amedee O. "Dick" Richards Jr.
- 1992: Evelyn Fierro
- 1996–1997; 2000–2001: Dorothy Cohen
- 2003–2004; 2007–2008; 2011–2012; 2016–2017; 2021–2022: Michael A. Cacciotti
- 2004–2005: Mike Ten
- 2013–2014; 2018–2019: Marina Khubesrian
- 2014–2015; 2019–2020: Robert S. Joe
- 2015–2016; 2020–2021: Diana Mahmud
- 2017–2018: Richard Schneider
- 2022–2023: Jon Primuth
- 2023–2024: Evelyn G. Zneimer
- 2024–2025: Janet Braun
- 2025-2026: Sheila Rossi

=== State and federal ===
In the California State Legislature, South Pasadena is in the 25th senatorial district, represented by Democrat Sasha Renée Pérez, and in the 49th Assembly district, represented by Democrat Mike Fong.

In the United States House of Representatives, South Pasadena is in California's 28th congressional district, represented by Democrat Judy Chu.

=== Voting history ===
South Pasadena vote by party in presidential elections
Year	Democrat		Republican		Other		Total
	%	#	%	#	%	#	#
2024	75.00%	10,887	18.48%	2,683	6.52%	945	14,515
2020	78.98%	12,246	18.79%	2,915	2.22%	345	15,506
2016	75.19%	9,739	18.87%	2,442	5.94%	770	12,951
2012	70.40%	8,578	26.64%	3,546	2.96%	360	12,484
2008	68.75%	8,939	28.42%	3,744	2.45%	319	13,002
2004	64.37%	5,780	34.25%	3,076	1.37%	123	8,979

== Education ==
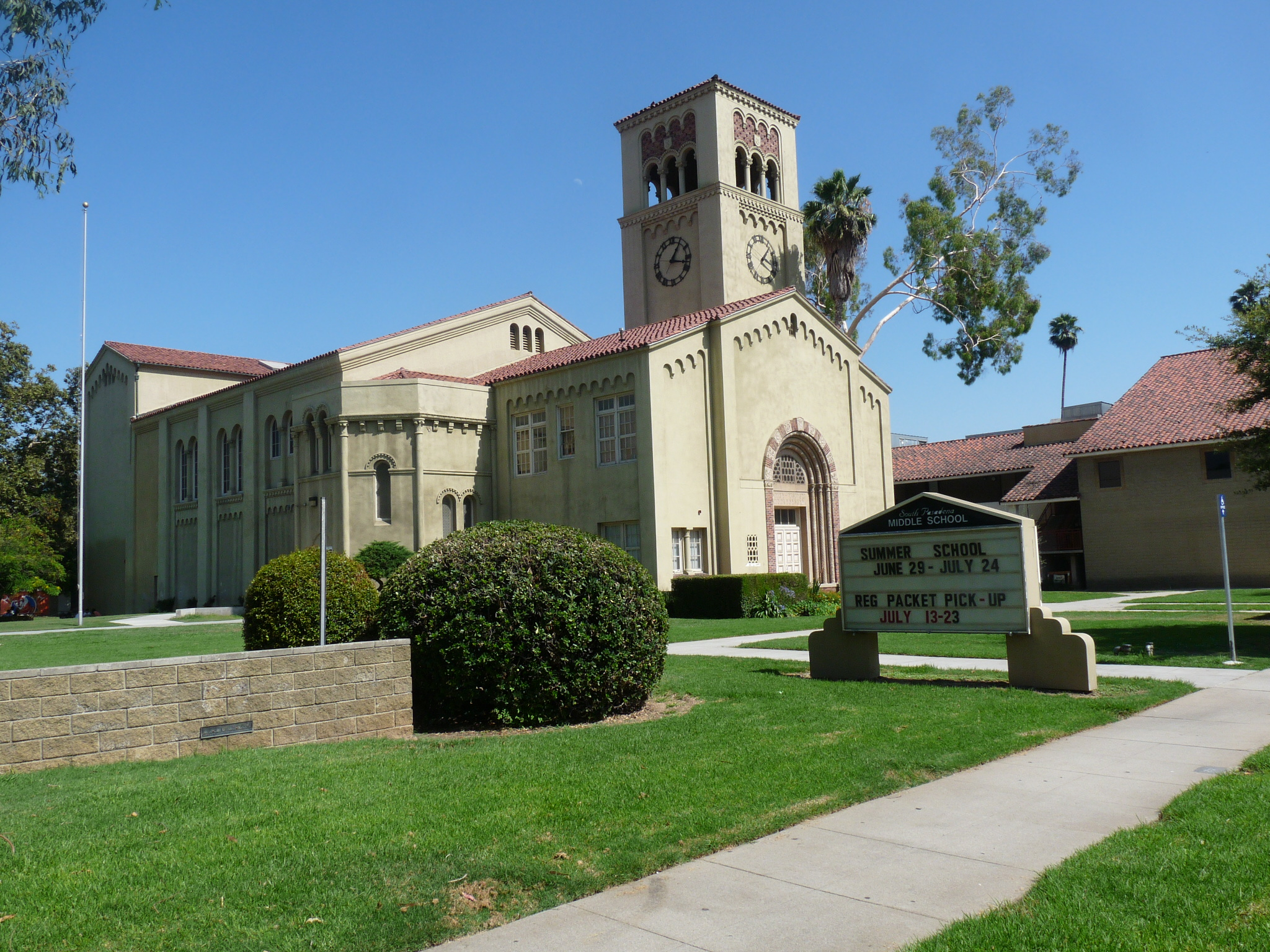
South Pasadena Middle School before the 2009 renovations

The South Pasadena Unified School District (SPUSD) includes five schools: three elementary schools (Monterey Hills, Marengo and Arroyo Vista), South Pasadena Middle School, and South Pasadena High School. Former elementary schools now closed or renamed are Lincoln (now Arroyo Vista), El Centro (more recently known as the former school district headquarters), Las Flores (limited grades, near Flores Adobe, historic landmark), and Oneonta (later a private Montessori school).

South Pasadena and the neighboring city of San Marino have had a long-standing rivalry. Until 1955, the two cities shared the same high school, which was adjacent to the South Pasadena Public Library. Every year, the schools' football teams compete for a victor's plaque. As of 2025, South Pasadena team had won 31 and San Marino 37. There have been three ties. Many SPHS team have won CIF titles over the years.

SPEF (South Pasadena Educational Foundation) is a 501(c)(3) charity designated by the SPUSD as the official private fund-raising organization for the support of the district's educational programs.

== Infrastructure ==
=== Transportation ===
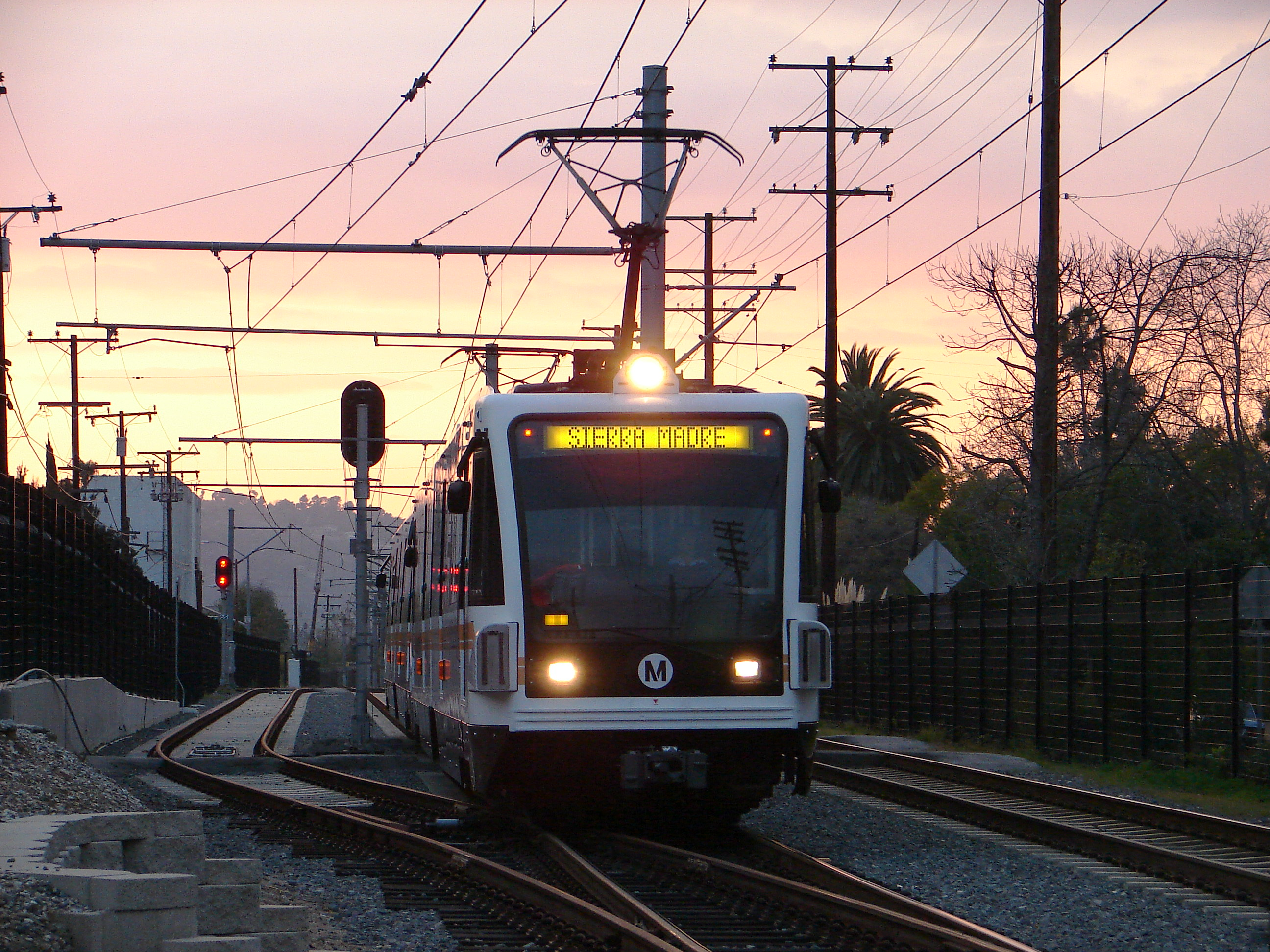
The Los Angeles Metro L Line passing through South Pasadena

Fair Oaks Avenue, Huntington Drive, Fremont Avenue, and Mission Street are the main thoroughfares through South Pasadena.

The Arroyo Seco Parkway, formerly the Pasadena Freeway, has two exits in South Pasadena--Orange Grove Avenue and Fair Oaks Avenue.

LA Metro operates two bus lines (258 & 260) through South Pasadena. The South Pasadena station for the Metro A Line, formerly the Gold Line, is in the heart of South Pasadena, located at the corner of Mission and Meridian.

South Pasadena operates its own public transportation system. Since 2003, South Pasadena has been operating the City of South Pasadena Community Transit to connect with the Mission A Line Station, whose schedule is linked to the A Line schedule. The system was originally called "South Pasadena Gold Link". Additionally South Pasadena has a transit shuttle that operates around the city.

=== Health care ===
The Los Angeles County Department of Health Services operates the Monrovia Health Center in Monrovia, serving South Pasadena. In addition to public health services, South Pasadena is served by a range of private medical and dental practices that provide routine and specialized care to residents.

=== Fire ===
The South Pasadena Fire Department provides fire protection services for the city of South Pasadena.

=== Police ===
The South Pasadena Police Department provides law enforcement services.

=== Animal services ===
As of 2026 the Pasadena Humane Society contracts with the City of South Pasadena for animal services.

== Notable people ==
- Meredith Baxter, actress, born in South Pasadena
- Whitney Blake, actress, director, producer
- Alison Brie, actress, writer, and producer
- Michael Catherwood, radio and television personality
- Ed Cobb, record producer, songwriter, and musician
- John Daniel, magician and collector (c. 1931–2011)
- Joe Davis, Los Angeles Dodgers television and Fox Sports play-by-play announcer
- John de Lancie, theater and TV and film actor, Q on Star Trek: The Next Generation
- Kristinia DeBarge, singer, songwriter, reality star; born in South Pasadena
- Andy Dick, actor and comedian
- Thomas Francis Ford (1873–1958), member of Congress, editor, specialist in international trade and the only person ever sent to the Los Angeles City Council by a write-in vote
- Victoria Forester, New York Times best-selling children's book author
- Edward Furlong, actor
- Lucretia Garfield, wife of President James A. Garfield
- Sophia Hammons, actor
- William F. Harrah, founder of Harrah's Hotels and Casinos; born in South Pasadena
- William Holden, Academy Award-winning actor
- Minerva Hamilton Hoyt, early activist in California to preserve its deserts
- Porochista Khakpour, Iranian American writer
- Dave King, musician, member of Flogging Molly
- Bob Long, football player for UCLA and 1957 NFL champion Detroit Lions
- Federico Mena, Mexican programmer, creator of the GNOME desktop environment
- Sparky Marcus (real name Marcus Issoglio), child actor
- Noelle Scaggs, singer, musician, member of Fitz and the Tantrums
- Cody McMains, actor
- Joel McCrea, actor, born in South Pasadena
- Jack McGrath, auto racer
- Rich Moore, Emmy-winning animation director (The Simpsons, Futurama), and partner in Rough Draft Studios, Inc. (Glendale, CA)
- Kim Soon-kwon, Korean-born biochemist, specializing in hybrid and engineered corn to combat starvation
- Bronson Pinchot, actor
- James Reynolds, actor, Days of Our Lives
- David Lee Roth, singer, member of Van Halen
- Sakaye Shigekawa, obstetrician
- Hilary Swank, Academy Award-winning actress
- Juan Francisco Azcárate, aircraft designer, Mexico's military attache to Germany and later to the United States during World War II.
- David Tom, actor
- Heather Tom, actress, The Bold and the Beautiful
- Nicholle Tom, actress, The Nanny
- Cheryl Walker, actress, born in South Pasadena
- Steven Alvarez, vocalist, percussionist, film and stage producer
- Jaleel White, actor
- Lisa Yee, children's book author

== See also ==
- Baranger Studios
- History of Pasadena, California

== Gallery ==
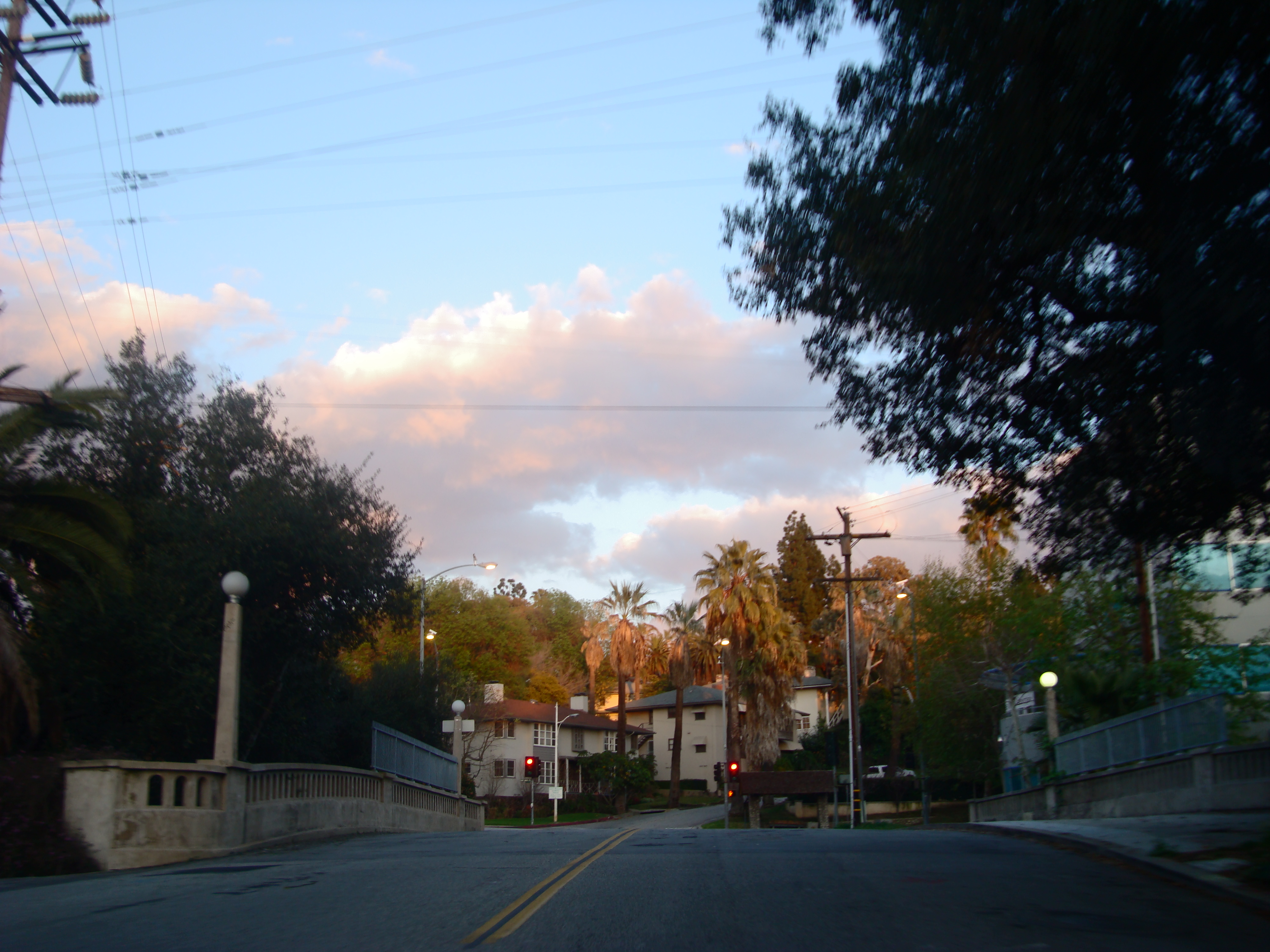
Columbia Avenue

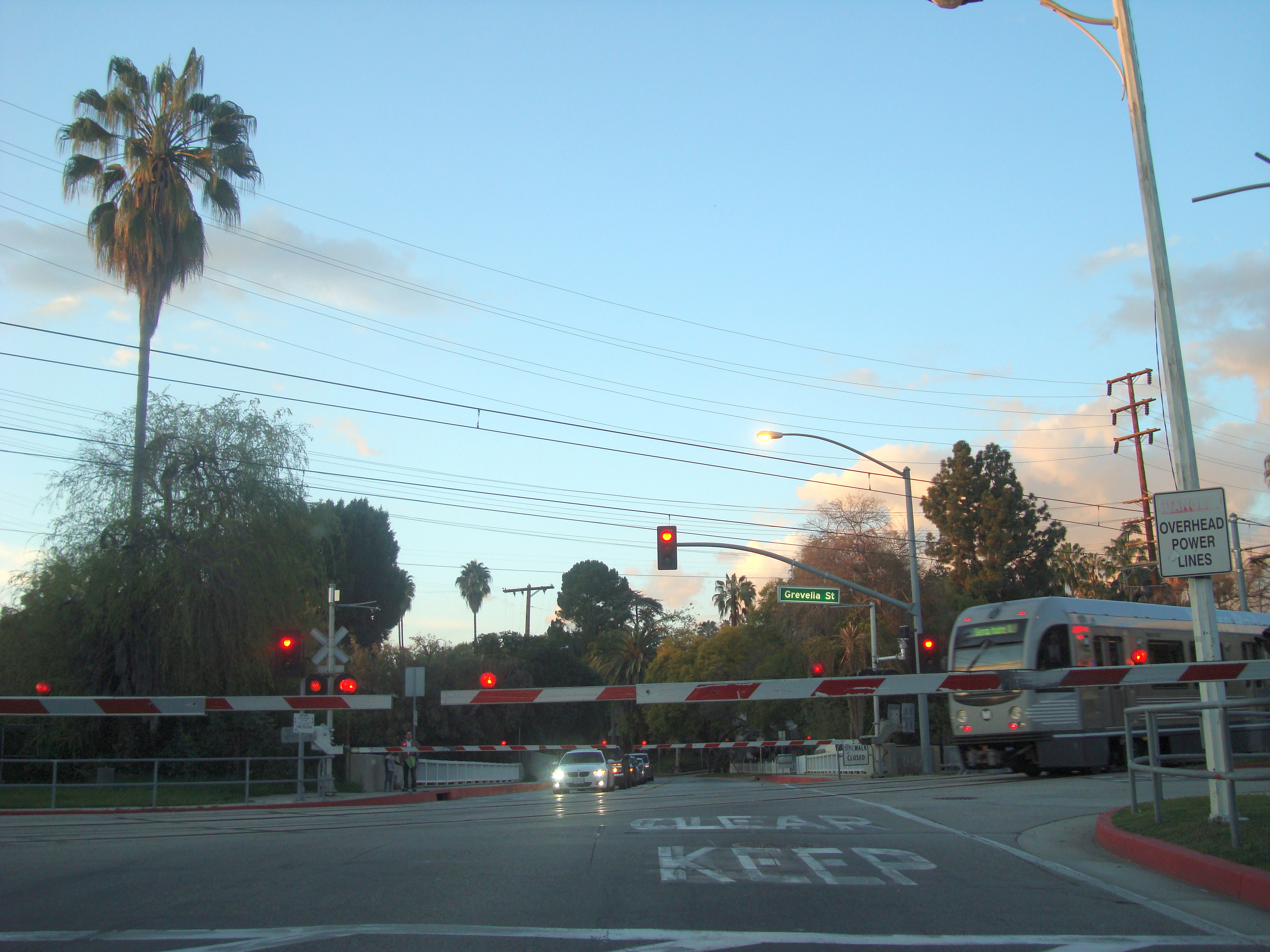
The Gold Line crossing Fremont Avenue

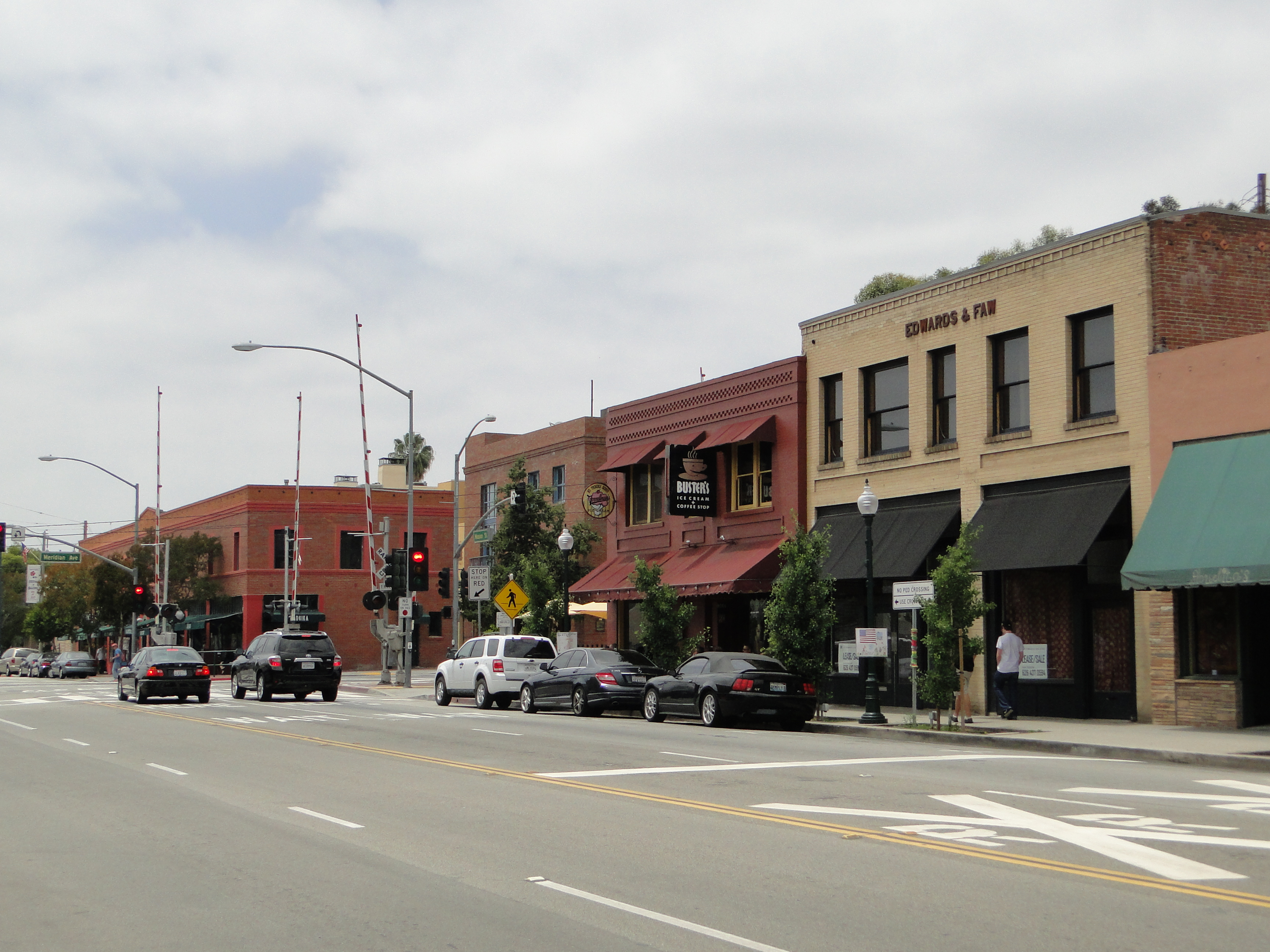
North side of Mission Street
