= John Harvey Gahan =

Canadian musician (1888–1958)

- John Harvey "Oscar" Gahan
- Born: John Harvey Gerald Gahan; August 20, 1888; Orangeville, Ontario, Canada
- Died: March 24, 1958 (aged 69); Los Angeles, California, United States
- Occupations: Actor, Violinist, Composer
- Spouse(s): Julia Magdalene Newell, Josephine Morong Runnels, Marguerite Depugh

John Harvey "Oscar" Gahan (born John Harvey Gerald Gahan; August 20, 1888 – March 24, 1958) was a Canadian child prodigy violinist and actor. Gahan played a performance for the Prince of Wales (later King Edward VII) at age 5. As a virtuoso violinist he performed under the name Arvé. Later in his career, he became a western actor.

== Background ==
John Harvey Gahan was born near Orangeville, Ontario where his father, John James Gahan, had married his mother, Sarah Anne Porterfield, in 1887. Harvey is known to have had one sibling, Alexandria (Alice) Gahan, born in 1902 in Toronto where, in 1911, Harvey married Julia Magdalene Newell of Ohio.

Harvey met his second wife, Josepine Morong Runnels (née Whistum Analyx or Whist-am-nallyx), during a concert in an opera house owned by her father. He was introduced to her in his dressing room after the concert. Josephine, a member of the Sanpoil Native American tribe in the Pacific Northwest and granddaughter of chief Que Que Tas, was in the midst of a divorce from her husband George Whitely. Harvey began a courtship with her and later married her in 1919. They had three separate marriage ceremonies, the first a Native American ceremony, followed by a Catholic ceremony, and later a third ceremony conducted by a federal court judge.

Gahan, while performing the Orpheum Circuit, was set up by the theatre manager in Chicago. During a sound check before the performance, a stagehand called him to the telephone, and stole his valuable Stradivarius while he was checking the phone. After the theft, Gahan subsequently sank into a deep depression. His first cousin Walter Huston wired to convince Gahan to perform in vaudeville. Gahan joined Walter and his wife at their boarding house in Niagara Falls and began performing.

Eventually Huston and his wife moved out west and he once again wired Gahan to convince him to act in films.

Gahan worked his way across America performing in medicine shows and selling snake oil. He joined the Spade Cooley Band performed with the Sons of the Pioneers and eventually made it to Hollywood where he was one of the busiest bit part players in B-Westerns of the late 1930s. Gahan began his 1935-1942 screen career as a member of several hillbilly music groups, including being an original member of the band known as The Arizona Wranglers (aka The Range Riders), which also included stalwart B-Western player Jack Kirk, stuntman Jack Jones, and actor Deuce Spriggins. Gahan appeared both with the music group and on his own, usually cast as a henchman. Gahan was also a member of Loyal Underwood's Range Riders on radio, and several other groups over the years.

His marriage to Runnels deteriorated due to his constant traveling. They had two daughters, RoseAnne Gahan, a child actress, and Pearl Marie Gahan. In 1956 he married Marguerite Depugh, who had been a nurse for Spencer Tracy's son John, and was at the time a nurse to Roy Rogers' and Dale Evans' children.

At the time of his death in 1958 at the Queen of Angels Hospital, Gahan was a member of the band Hollywood Hillbillies. He wrote many well-loved cowboy songs and sold them to better known performers such as Bob Nolan, Roy Rogers, and Gene Autry.
