= Key set =

Series of film stills for publicity

A key set is a sequentially numbered set of selected film stills which were taken before, during and after a film is made. They are accumulated in a binder or binders to be distributed free to fan magazines for publicity purposes. Important films would generate hundreds of stills, usually 8 x 10 photographs. Some films would use even larger formats for their prints.

The complete binders, also referred to as "master still-books," would include pre-production photos of costume studies, or candid photos taken on the set during production. The photos were organized with numbers printed in the margins. The most important and widely distributed photos were taken in separate photo studios, which consisted of portraits of stars, featured players, and sometimes the director. The film Gone With the Wind had a key set of stills containing more than 1,000 photographs. Because of the Production Code of 1930, which reviewed films before release to maintain moral values, still photographers also had to submit their key set to movie censors for their stamp before being distributed to the press.

Most feature films have a still photographer, who is typically required to find the best scenes to shoot photos of, using their own judgement. They are often considered a nuisance to the director, since they would ask the actors to hold a position for the shot. "Hold for stills," a request made by the photographer, has therefore been an irritant to most directors, who need to move on to creating the next scene. Although some directors, such as Cecil B. DeMille, gave special attention to stills, and would often direct the photography with the still photographer. He was especially proud of his stills, creating many large, gallery-quality prints to give to important fan magazines. "I make far more stills than any other company," he told producer Jesse Lasky. "There is greater attention given to gowns, detail, story and direction than in any picture made today."

== See also ==
- Film stills
- Unit still photographer
