= Queen of Angels Hospital =

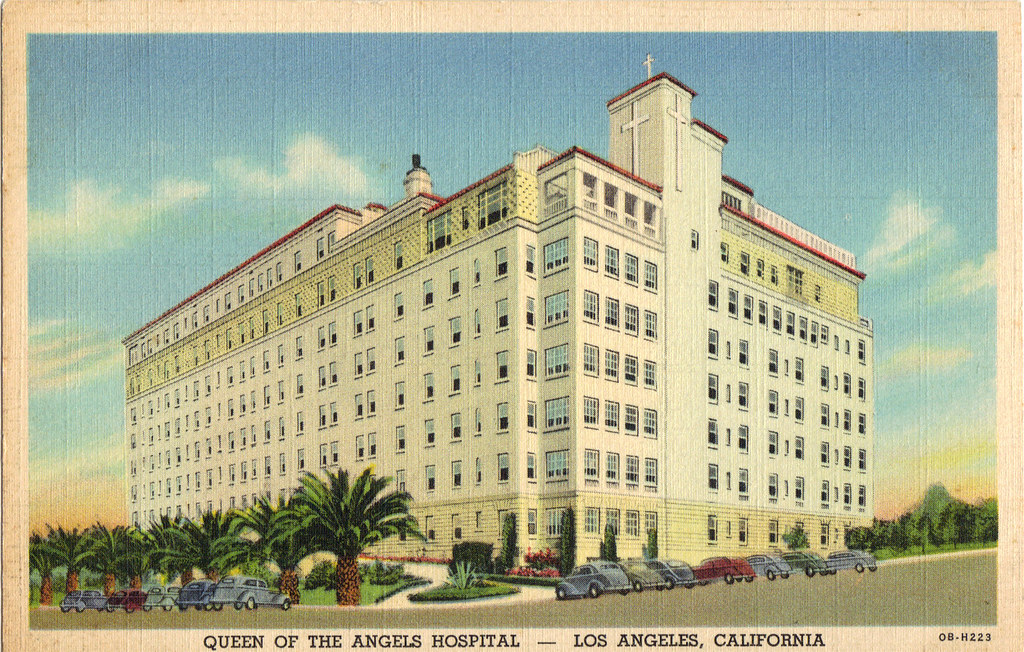
- Postcard depicting Queen of Angels Hospital, circa 1930-1945

Geography
- Location: 2301 Bellevue Avenue; Los Angeles, California, United States
- Coordinates: 34°04′28″N 118°16′11″W

Organization
- Care system: Private
- Type: Teaching
- Affiliated university: Franciscan Sisters of the Sacred Heart

Services
- Beds: 404

History
- Founded: 1926
- Closed: 1989

Links
- Lists: Hospitals in California

The Queen of Angels Hospital was a private hospital complex located at 2301 Bellevue Avenue in the Echo Park neighborhood of Los Angeles, California. The 404-bed hospital was founded in 1926 by the Franciscan Sisters of the Sacred Heart and built by architect Albert C. Martin, Sr. The hospital served the local community and ran a nursing school. After its closure, the hospital served as a film set for the local film and television industry. The property was eventually sold to the Assembly of God church and is now known as the Dream Center.

== Location ==
The hospital consisted of a number of buildings, but the iconic main building is known because it looms over the Hollywood Freeway. The hilltop site was chosen for the hospital because it was close to both Sunset Boulevard and Temple Street, and because it was outside Downtown Los Angeles.

== History ==
Seeing a need for quality care in the city, the Franciscan Sisters went as far as begging door to door to accrue money for the hospital. Once built, the hospital kept growing in size by adding wings and new buildings, topping out at 14 stories in height. Due to excess capacity, the operations of the Queen of Angels Hospital were merged with the Hollywood Presbyterian Medical Center in 1989, becoming known as the Queen of Angels – Hollywood Presbyterian Medical Center.

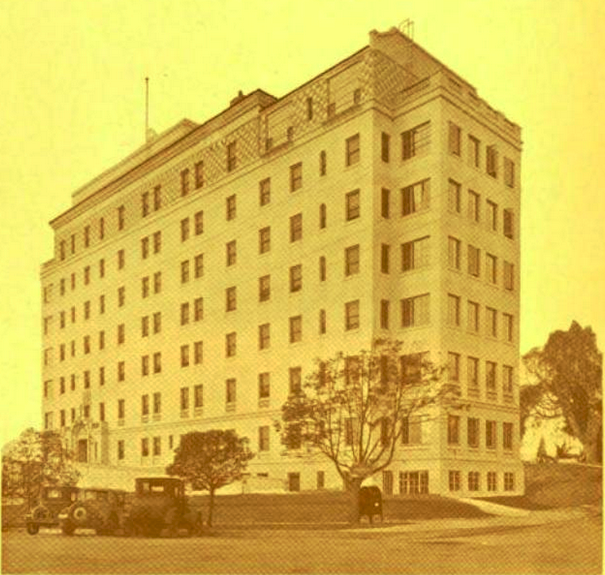
The hospital before expansion, circa 1928

Due to its proximity to Hollywood, several notable people were born (Jill St. John, Michael Reagan, Bob Beemer, John David Carson, Harry Crosby, Marcia Reed, Madeleine Stowe, Mike Thaler, Victoria Vetri) or died (Esther Dale, John Harvey Gahan, Linda Loredo, Robert Asa Todd) there.

Kathryn Crosby was an alumna of the nursing school. Sakaye Shigekawa was a past president of the hospital. Tirso del Junco was once the medical chief of staff. During its heyday, the hospital was a "centerpiece" of the city's hospital community.

== Filming site ==
In 1951, the exterior was used as the setting for the fictitious Mercy General Hospital in the Adventures of Superman television series. After its closure, the main building, a Spanish-style hospital complex, was used primarily as a film set. It appeared in a number of productions, including Halloween: The Curse of Michael Myers, Men Don't Tell, Snapdragon, Late for Dinner, The Invaders, and The Innocent.
