= John A. Daniel =

American magician and a collector and dealer of magician memorabilia

John A. Daniel (c. 1931 – 2011) (a.k.a. John Daniels) was magician and a collector and dealer of magician memorabilia, Baranger Motion machines, vintage electric trains, toys, antique carousels and other collectibles.

== Magician ==
What started as a hobby at age nine, combined with his skills developed in his Dad’s business (Lee & Daniel Steel Fabricators), quickly progressed to working in a factory that manufactured some illusions and tricks for Harry Houdini as well as many other magicians. As a very young magician John met Bess Houdini who was stage assistant and wife of Harry Houdini.

John a toured with school assembly shows and the southwestern states with a midnight spook show, "Dr. Doom's Dungeon of Death," and "Daniel's Magic Circus." His hobby was antique magic collecting.

In 1952 he opened "Daniel's Magic Den" in Pasadena and put out several items under the "Trickmasters" label.

From 1953 to 1955, he served in the Artillery and was over-seas for 18 months. He did do a few shows, and while doing one in Berlin, he met Irene Stolz (the future Irene Larsen). He eventually brought her back to the United States in 1957 as his magician's assistant and they were married.

He joined forces with Carl Owen in 1958 and eventually purchased Owen Magic in 1960. Daniel was known for his development work “thin model” of sawing a woman in half.

After divorcing Irene, he married Catherine Cynthia Birch (Miss Virginia 1960, Miss America 1961 contestant) who had become his magician's assistant.

== Baranger motion displays ==
Baranger Motion machines or "Baranger Motions" were store-window mechanical animated advertising displays, rented to jewelers, and produced from 1925 to 1959 by the Baranger Company of South Pasadena, California USA. In 1978, the Baranger Studios building and stock of animated displays were bought by Burton A. Burton. John was put in charge of repairing motions and selling duplicates. John became a collector of them. 1986 Daniel sold his collection of 90 motions to Teruhisa Kitahara. John Daniel subsequently bought the remaining stock of motions from Burton A. Burton. In 1993, Daniel published a 60 minute VHS video showing 122 motions and in 2001, Daniel published a book showing images of all the motions plus a history of the business.

== Model trains and other collecting ==
John was a builder and dealer vintage electric trains, toys, antique carousels and other collectibles. John was the president of the T.T.O.S. (Toy Train Operators Society). Daniel collected magic props, posters and tricks including a large collection of Dante the Magician.

== Awards ==
- “Best Stage Performer Award, The Academy of Magical Arts, (1969)
- Lifetime Achievement Fellowship, The Academy of Magical Arts (2011)
- John Daniel AMA Lifetime Achievement Award video-https://www.youtube.com/watch?v=TvQNc4JWSCM
