= Pale Rider =

1985 film by Clint Eastwood

- Theatrical release poster by C. Michael Dudash
- Directed by: Clint Eastwood
- Written by: Michael Butler; Dennis Shryack; Clint Eastwood (uncredited)
- Produced by: Clint Eastwood
- Starring: Clint Eastwood; Michael Moriarty; Carrie Snodgress; Christopher Penn; Richard Dysart; Sydney Penny; Richard Kiel; Doug McGrath; John Russell
- Cinematography: Bruce Surtees
- Edited by: Joel Cox
- Music by: Lennie Niehaus
- Production company: The Malpaso Company
- Distributed by: Warner Bros.
- Release dates: May 13, 1985 (Cannes); June 26, 1985 (United States)
- Running time: 116 minutes
- Country: United States
- Language: English
- Budget: $6.9 million
- Box office: $41.4 million

Pale Rider is a 1985 American Western film produced and directed by Clint Eastwood, who also stars in the lead role. The title is a reference to Death as one of the Four Horsemen of the Apocalypse, described in the Book of Revelation (also spoken in the film's dialogue) as riding a pale horse; in the film, Eastwood rides a pale horse. The film took in over $41 million at the box office. It is Eastwood's only Western of the 1980s.

== Plot ==
In the Old West, outside LaHood, California, in Carbon Canyon, mining baron Coy LaHood is waging a war of intimidation against independent prospectors and their families — including Hull Barret, who is courting Sarah Wheeler. Sarah's teenage daughter, Megan — desperate for deliverance from LaHood after a gang of his men attack the mining camp and kill her dog – prays for a miracle.

Shortly afterward, a man rides a pale horse into Carbon Canyon. When Hull heads to town to pick up supplies, four of LaHood's men harass and assault him, but the stranger intervenes and effortlessly fights them off with an axe handle. Thankful, Hull invites his rescuer to dinner and, while the stranger is washing, notices what appear to be six bullet wounds in his back. When the stranger arrives at the dining table, he is wearing a clerical collar and is thereafter referred to as Preacher. Coy LaHood's son, Joshua, attempts to scare off Preacher with a gigantic workman, Club. Preacher quickly disables Club.

When Coy returns from Sacramento, he learns of Preacher's arrival and unsuccessfully attempts to bribe and then threaten him. At Preacher's suggestion, LaHood then offers the prospectors $1,000 per claim provided they evacuate within 24 hours. LaHood says he plans to hire the services of Stockburn, a corrupt marshal, to clear them out if they refuse. The prospectors ultimately reject LaHood's offer, despite Preacher warning them about Stockburn. Megan expresses her love for Preacher, but he gently rebuffs her. Megan angrily assumes Preacher is really in love with Sarah.

Preacher visits another town, entering a Wells Fargo bank. He retrieves two pistols from a security box and removes his clerical collar. LaHood's men dam the creek, which forces the miners to prospect a dry bed. Megan rides into LaHood's camp, where Joshua shows her the blasting operation before he attempts to rape her. Preacher arrives on horseback, disarms Joshua and shoots him through the hand.

Stockburn and his deputies arrive in LaHood. Coy gives him a rough description of Preacher, which startles Stockburn, because the man Coy is describing is dead. Spider Conway, one of the prospectors and Coy's former partner, discovers a large gold nugget in the dry creek bed. He rides into town with his teenage sons, where he yells drunken abuse at LaHood from the street. Stockburn and his deputies gun Conway down, with Stockburn himself shooting Conway in the head. Stockburn sends a message that he wants Preacher to meet him in town the next morning. Sarah begs Preacher not to go, and tells him she will marry Hull, despite her feelings for Preacher.

The following day, Preacher and Hull blow up LaHood's mining site with dynamite. To stop Hull from following him, Preacher scares off Hull's horse and rides into town alone. In the gunfight that follows, he kills all of LaHood's men when they attack him, except for two who run away. Then, one by one, Preacher kills all six of Stockburn's deputies. In the final shootout, Stockburn recognizes Preacher in disbelief before Stockburn is shot in the chest six times, leaving six exit wounds in his back similar to the wounds on Preacher's back. Preacher kills him with a shot to the head. LaHood, watching from his office, aims a rifle at the Preacher, but Hull, who walked all the way into town, shoots LaHood dead.

Preacher nods at Hull and rides off toward the snow-capped mountains. Megan arrives and, seeing Preacher riding away, shouts her love and gratitude to him.

== Cast ==
Clint Eastwood as the Preacher

- Clint Eastwood as The Preacher
- Michael Moriarty as Hull Barret
- Carrie Snodgress as Sarah Wheeler
- Christopher Penn as Josh LaHood
- Richard Dysart as Coy LaHood
- Sydney Penny as Megan Wheeler
- Richard Kiel as "Club"
- Doug McGrath as "Spider" Conway
- John Russell as Marshal Stockburn
- Charles Hallahan as McGill
- Marvin J. McIntyre as Jagou
- Fran Ryan as Ma Blankenship
- Richard Hamilton as Pa Blankenship
- Graham Paul as Ev Gossage
- Chuck Lafont as Eddie Conway
- Jeffrey Weissman as Teddy Conway
- Allen Keller as Tyson
- Tom Oglesby as Elam
- Herman Poppe as Ulrik Lindquist
- Terrence Evans as Jake Henderson
- S. A. Griffin as Deputy Folke
- Jack Radosta as Deputy Grissom
- Robert Winley as Deputy Kobold
- Billy Drago as Deputy Mather
- Jeffrey Josephson as Deputy Sedge
- John Dennis Johnston as Deputy Tucker
- Gerry Gatlin as Horseman

== Production ==
Pale Rider was primarily filmed in the Boulder Mountains and the Sawtooth National Recreation Area in central Idaho, just north of Sun Valley in late 1984. The opening credits scene featured the jagged Sawtooth Mountains south of Stanley. Train-station scenes were filmed in Tuolumne County, California, near Jamestown.

Scenes of a more established Gold Rush town (in which Eastwood's character picks up his pistols at a Wells Fargo office) were filmed in the real Gold Rush town of Columbia, also in Tuolumne County.

== Crew ==
- Clint Eastwood: Producer/director
- Lennie Niehaus: Composer
- Bruce Surtees: Director of photography
- Joel Cox: Film editing
- Edward Carfagno: Production design
- Chuck Gaspar: Special effects
- Buddy Van Horn: Stunt coordinator
- Jack N. Green: Camera operator
- Marcia Reed: Still photographer
- Deborah Hopper: Costume designer/wardrobe: women

== Religious themes ==
In an audio interview, Clint Eastwood said that his character Preacher "is an out-and-out ghost." However, whereas Eastwood's 1973 western, High Plains Drifter, resolves its storyline by means of a series of unfolding flashback narratives (although ambiguity still remains), Pale Rider does not include any such obvious clues to the nature and past of Preacher other than six bullet wound scars on his back and his relationship with Stockburn, who claims he once knew a man like the Preacher. Viewers are left to draw their own conclusions regarding the overall story line and its meaning.

The movie's title is taken from the Book of Revelation, chapter 6, verse 8: "And I looked, and behold a pale horse: and his name that sat on him was Death, and Hell followed with him." The reading of the biblical passage describing this character is neatly choreographed to correspond with the sudden appearance of the Preacher, who arrived as a result of a prayer from Megan, in which she quoted Psalm 23. Preacher's comment after beating one of the villains is, "Well, the Lord certainly does work in mysterious ways." After Coy offers to let him establish a lucrative ministry in his town, the Preacher replies, "You can't serve God and Mammon both, Mammon being money." According to Robert Jewett, the film's dialogue parallels Paul the Apostle's teaching on divine retribution (Romans 12:19–21).

== Reception ==
Pale Rider was released in the United States in June 1985 and became one of the highest-grossing Westerns of the 1980s, grossing $41.4 million against a $6.9 million budget. It was the first mainstream Hollywood Western to be produced after the massive financial failure of Heaven's Gate (1980).

On Rotten Tomatoes the film has an approval rating of 94% based on reviews from 31 critics. The site's consensus states: "Nearly a decade after The Outlaw Josey Wales, Clint Eastwood returns as a director to the genre that made his name with this elegant, spiritual Western that riffs on the classic Shane." On Metacritic the film has a score of 61% based on reviews from 13 critics, indicating "generally favorable reviews".

In his review in The New York Times, Vincent Canby praises Clint Eastwood's performance: "This veteran movie icon handles both jobs [lead actor and director] with such intelligence and facility I'm just now beginning to realize that, though Mr. Eastwood may have been improving over the years, it's also taken all these years for most of us to recognize his very consistent grace and wit as a film maker," concluding that "it's so evocative of a fabled time and place that it never allows the movie to self-destruct in parody. Pale Rider is the first decent western in a very long time."

Rita Kempley dissented in The Washington Post, finding that "pretty soon we recollect why westerns lost their appeal. . .[the] movie is real pretty, full of little gold aspens and snow-capped mountains, but it is slow, dark and badly timed." On the other hand, Gene Siskel of the Chicago Tribune comments that, though Westerns were out of fashion, "fresh and challenging westerns with Clint Eastwood always will be in vogue."

Roger Ebert also praises the film, giving it four out of four stars. He adds: "Pale Rider is, overall, a considerable achievement, a classic Western of style and excitement."

Richard Corliss finds the film overly derivative, saying: "When Eastwood, who also directed the picture (from a Michael Butler-Dennis Shryack script), faces off against Russell's Maleficent Seven, viewers may get an old-fashioned western tingle. But Pale Rider does nothing to disprove the wisdom that this genre is best left to the revival houses. A double feature of Shane and Eastwood's High Plains Drifter will do just fine, thanks."

The film was entered into the 1985 Cannes Film Festival and included in the Western nominations for the American Film Institute's 10 Top 10 lists.

== Trailer music ==
The music used in the film's trailer was a stock piece by British composer Alan Hawkshaw known to British viewers for its use as the title theme for Channel 4 News. Channel 4 News did not secure permanent exclusivity rights to Hawkshaw's theme, titled "Best Endeavours", resulting in it also being used for the trailer for Pale Rider.

== Bibliography ==
- Hughes, Howard (2009). Aim for the Heart. London: I.B. Tauris. ISBN 978-1-84511-902-7.
