= Marcia Reed =

- Born: Marcia Ann Reed; 1948 (age 77–78); Hollywood, California, U.S.
- Education: Art Center College of Design
- Occupation: Still photographer
- Parent(s): Josefina Flores and Paul "Dean" Reed

Marcia Ann Reed (born 1948) was the first unionized female still photographer in the motion picture industry, having joined the International Cinematographers Guild in 1973 as a unit still photographer. She was also the first woman to win a Society of Operating Cameramen Lifetime Achievement Award (Still Photographer) in 2000.

== Early life ==
Reed was born in 1948 at Queen of Angels Hospital in Los Angeles. She is the only child of Josefina Flores and Paul "Dean" Reed. Her mother was with the WAVES (Women Accepted for Volunteer Emergency Service) based out of Tucson, during World War II. Her father, (who worked as P. Dean Reed) was a television engineer and unit production manager on television shows. She attended Grant High School (Los Angeles) in Valley Glen, California and was one of the first female students to take a photography class which led to her interest in becoming a professional photographer.

After high school, Marcia applied to the prestigious Art Center College of Design and was one of the first women accepted into the Photography Program to graduate. For her final assignment, prior to graduating in 1970, Marcia created a Style Book on behind-the-scenes of a typical television production which led to her being offered a chance to be a non-union production photographer for the local television networks beginning in 1971. At that time, she also began working for Lucille Ball at Desilu Studios on a variety of productions.

== Career ==
By March 2, 1973, Reed had her first movie assignment working on the set of the film Rhinoceros, starring Gene Wilder and Zero Mostel. It was to be the first of two films working with Wilder (the other was Another You with Richard Pryor). Rhinoceros, released in 1974, was the first film to have a woman as the union still photographer. She has worked on more than fifty motion pictures including: Leap of Faith (1992), LA Story (1991), Paradise (1991), Another You (1991), Maniac Cop 2 (1990), Turner & Hooch (1989), Pink Cadillac (1989), The Dead Pool (1988), Bird (1998), The Seventh Sign (1988), Back to the Beach (1987), Heartbreak Ridge (1986), Ratboy (1986), Pale Rider (1985), Get Crazy (1983), Kiss Me Goodbye (1982), Endangered Species (1982), Heartbeeps (1981), Ordinary People (1980), The Muppet Movie (1979), Comes a Horseman (1978), The Gauntlet (1977), The Enforcer (1976), The Last Tycoon (1976) and Rhinoceros (1974).

Reed has one visual effects credit as a still photographer in 1977 on IMDB for Close Encounters of the Third Kind (she spent a month on foot taking the Devil's Tower photographs) where she is listed as Marcia Reid.
