= Sakaye Shigekawa =

American physician

- Born: January 6, 1913; South Pasadena, California
- Died: October 18, 2013 (aged 100); Los Angeles
- Education: University of Southern California, Loyola University Chicago
- Occupation: physician

Sakaye Shigekawa (January 6, 1913 – October 18, 2013) was an American physician who specialized in obstetrics. Born to Japanese-American parents, she was imprisoned and forced to live and work at an internment camp in California, providing medical care to fellow Japanese-American internees during World War II. She completed her training in Chicago before returning to Los Angeles in 1948, where she practiced for more than 50 years.

== Early life ==
Shigekawa was born in 1913 in South Pasadena, California. Her father, Tsunetaro Shigekawa, worked as a gardener and a hog farmer, while her mother, Shina (Nagasaki) Shigekawa, was a picture bride; both had migrated to the United States from Shikoku. She and her twin sister, younger sister, and younger brother grew up in a house on Central Avenue in Los Angeles, in a neighborhood that housed numerous Japanese Americans. She was inspired to become a physician when her father was hospitalized for pneumonia. After graduating from Jefferson High School, she studied at University of Southern California (USC) and then the Stritch School of Medicine at Loyola University Chicago. She had wanted to complete her medical degree at USC, but when she applied in 1935 the university did not admit women to the medical program. She graduated from Loyola in 1940.

== Career ==
Shigekawa completed her medical internship at Mercy Hospital in Bay City, Michigan, where she became the second female medical intern. She began her residency at Los Angeles County Hospital but all of the hospital's Japanese-American staff were dismissed in 1941 in the aftermath of the attack on Pearl Harbor. She then worked briefly at Seaside Memorial Hospital before being forced to move to the Santa Anita Assembly Center, a processing center for the internment of Japanese Americans during World War II, where she was one of seven imprisoned physicians of Japanese background who provided care for 17,000 fellow inmates. Shigekawa was the youngest of the doctors at 29 years old, and the only woman. When she was ordered to move to Wyoming to be interned and work at the Heart Mountain Relocation Center, another internment camp for Japanese Americans, she sent letters to the government saying that she refused to go and that if forced to move there she would not work. She was subsequently released to live in Chicago, where she finished her residency in obstetrics at Walter Memorial Hospital. She worked at a private practice with another woman physician until 1948, when she returned to Los Angeles.

Shigekawa set up a medical practice on Santa Monica Boulevard in Hollywood in 1949. In the same year, she began working at Queen of Angels Hospital in Los Angeles, where she was the first Japanese-American staff member, and in 1977 she became the first woman to be elected president of the hospital. She worked at her Hollywood practice for more than 50 years, and in 2000 she estimated that throughout her career she had delivered between 20,000 and 30,000 babies.

In 1993, Shigekawa received Loyola University's Stritch Award "for outstanding research or humanitarian contributions in medicine". She served as president of Japanese Community Health Inc. and was a member of the Japanese American Medical Association.

== Death ==
Shigekawa died in Los Angeles on October 18, 2013, aged 100.
