= Unit still photographer =

Filmmaking occupation

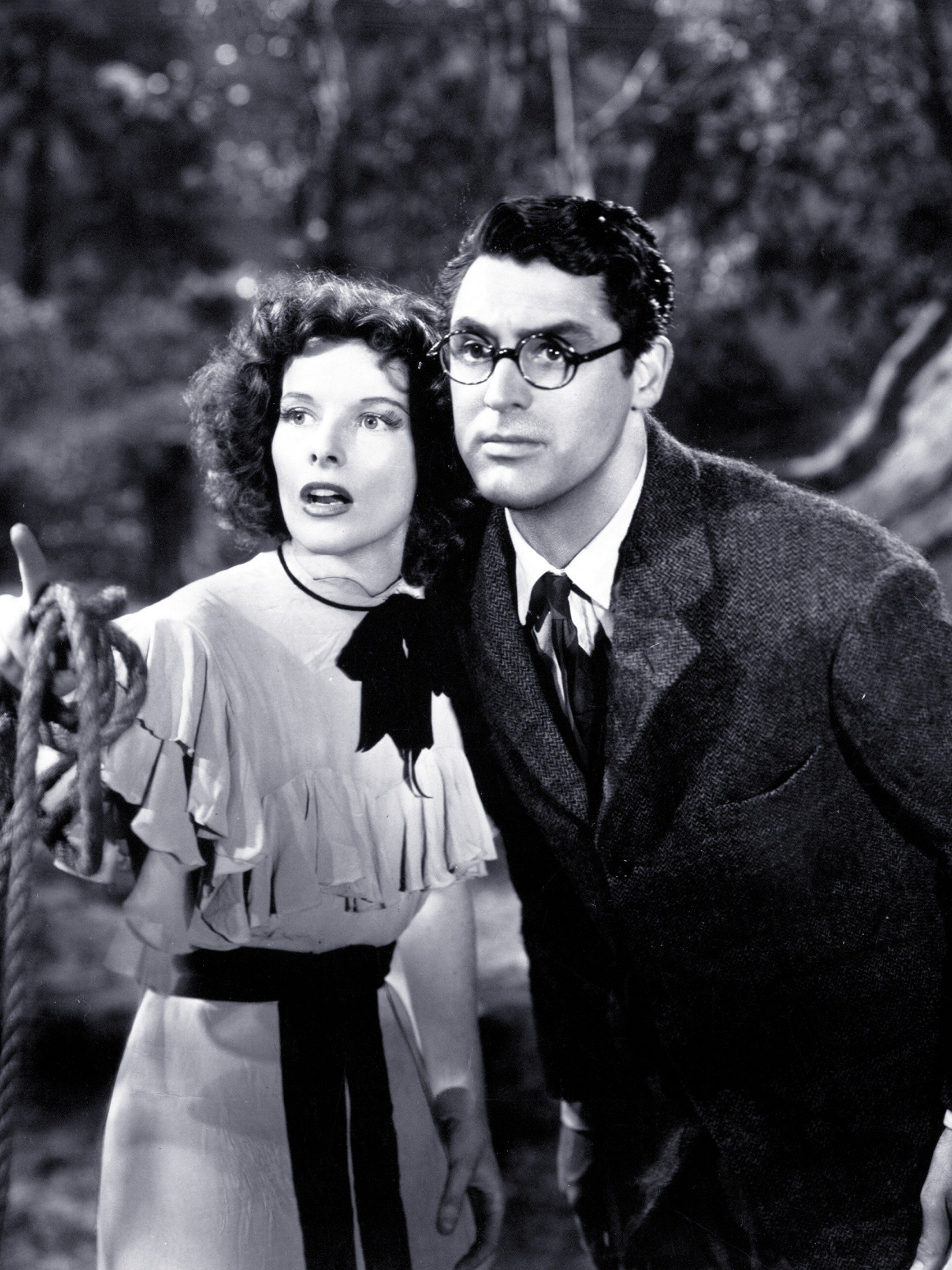
Film still from the 1938 film Bringing Up Baby featuring Katharine Hepburn and Cary Grant

A unit still photographer (or simply still photographer) creates still photos specifically for use in publicity and marketing of feature films and television productions. In addition to creating photographs for the promotion of a film, the still photographer contributes daily to the filming process by creating set stills (or plate shots). With these, the photographer is careful to record all details of the cast wardrobe, set appearance and background.

Cornel Lucas, a pioneer of film portraiture in the 1940s and 1950s, was the first still photographer to be awarded a BAFTA in 1998, for work with the British Film Industry.

== Uses in the industry ==
Due to their relatively low quality, it is not practical to use individual frames from film or recorded video material for still photographs. High resolution images are needed for theatrical release posters, DVD box artworks, official website photos, billboards, bus stop adverts, point-of-purchase displays, key art image sets released to the press and media, and other printed and online collateral materials.

Unit still photographers are also responsible for creating "photo props" and "set dressing images", the photos and images used on-camera to create various illusions such as forensic photos, crime drama booking photos, character driver's licenses, passport and I.D. photos, on-screen family photos, surveillance photos, computer screen displays, and any other image a producer may require in the course of a production.

In North America in particular, and some international locations, a unit still photographer must be a member of IATSE Local 600 International Cinematographers Guild in order to perform services on union productions and union studio lots and locations. The most prestigious of these unit still photographers are members of The Society of Motion Picture Still Photographers, an organization which promotes the work of those within the industry.

In the past, the director, costumer or the director of photography may have referred to these still images for continuity purposes, as the unit stills photographer was the only crew member permitted to take still photographs on set. With the introduction of instant cameras such as the Polaroid, and subsequent digital photo cameras, this job of taking continuity images has now fallen to the continuity and script supervisor.

While often perceived as a "glamour" job for photographers, the reality is often long hours (70-plus hours per week) in remote locations under difficult and often extreme conditions. The unit still photographer often coordinates with the unit publicist but physically works in close proximity to the film's camera crew, director and actors, and also in close proximity to the film's boom microphone operator. Unit still photographers go to great lengths to muffle the sound of their camera's motor drive and shutter to avoid distracting the actors, and to remain inaudible on the film's recorded dialogue soundtrack.

Typically, this is accomplished using a sound blimp, which is a sound-absorbing, foam-filled metal case in which the still camera body is fitted with a proprietary remote operation cable. This allows the camera to be activated and operated from a two-button (activation, focus, and shutter release) exterior control. Limitations exist once the blimp is closed around the camera, as one can no longer access the camera controls (f-number, shutter speed, ASA/ISO settings) or menu displays directly. The LCD for reviewing the images will also be obscured in the closed position. This requires the photographer to make control selections in advance and use those settings until the take in progress has been "cut", making adjustments only between takes or set-ups. Unit still photographers in this field typically produce over 2000 marketable images per week for their major-studio clients.

Since 2010, high-end DSLR cameras, which can be remotely controlled with mobile apps on smartphones and tablet computers, using the built-in 2-way Wi-Fi radio-controlled interface between the tablet and the DSLR camera, and offer internal active noise reduction technologies, have increased the ability of the unit still photographer to work quietly on the set.

== Notable still photographers ==
- Marcia Reed (born 1948), American
- Arthur "Weegee" Fellig (1899–1968), American
