= Kim Soon-kwon =

South Korean biologist (born 1945)

- Hangul: 김순권
- Hanja: 金順權
- RR: Gim Sungwon
- MR: Kim Sun'gwŏn

Kim Soon-kwon (born May 1, 1945) is a South Korean maize specialist employed by Handong Global University.

== Early life ==
Kim, better known in Korea as "Dr. Corn" or in Africa as "Green Revolutionary", was born to a poor family in Ulsan, on the southeast coast. This family depended on agriculture to survive, and Kim, as the son of the family, helped too. He studied at the Ulsan Agrarian Institute, expanding his agrarian knowledge. However, it was difficult to attend university because of his family's economic situation. Instead, he earned a scholarship and entered into the Faculty of Agriculture and Science of Life of Kyungpook National University in Korea.

Kim worked as a teacher to raise funds to attend university, as he dreamed of becoming an agricultural scientist and combating hunger around the world.

Having a passion for agriculture, he decided to expand his knowledge of corn. He studied in the University of Hawaii where he started to investigate corn, a principal factor in defeating the menace known as starvation. He was impressed with American corn, which was 30 times better than the Korean one at the time. His studies soon attracted interest. During that time, there were about 50 companies in the United States seeking "better corn", and they discovered Kim's research. "Mr Kim, your investigation is really incredible. We are amazed. Do you want to work for us? We will pay you 20 times more," but Mr Kim denied and he returned to Korea with his Hawaiian degree. Finally, he developed the varieties 18, 19 and 20 of Suwon, which he grew in Gangwon-do city. When the corn grew, Kim saw that they were as big as the American ones.

In fact, in only 5 years he developed a corn hybrid in Korea's favour, which United States made it in 55 years. This successful hybrid changed Korea's agriculture, who was unable to make more.

== Early goals ==
The IITA (International Institute of Tropical Agriculture) was founded in 1967 by 2 American organizations dedicated to caritative entities; this organization also held UN support. Dr Kim entered IITA, with his first mission in Nigeria, IITA's seat. Remembering his promise to help people, he went to Africa. There, he began to search for an African hybrid. It was said that central and western Africa weren't able to produce a hybrid, however Dr Kim continued to organize his efforts. He attempted to create varieties of cultivations, which could be helpful for farmers in Africa and elsewhere in the world, cultivations that resisted diseases. In time, Kim made a hybrid for farms in Western and Central Africa, concluding with the "Miracle of Central and Western Africa". Nigeria, which needed to import one million tons of corn yearly, is now self-sufficient in corn production.

During his stay in Africa, he contracted malaria 5 times, but has recovered each time. It is believed that he accumulated about a million kilometres in travel in and out of Central and Western Africa. "My best profit in Africa was the creation of varieties that could resist "striga", a herb known as "Devil's herb". This herb caused a loss of 7 billion dollars. Western investigators tried to beat the herb for 100 years, but without much effect. Dr. Kim did not try to beat the herb, instead, he tried to create a variety of corn that could co-exist with the striga. After developing a new African hybrid of corn, the loss of production was reduced from 73% to 5%. His method can be applied not only to corn, but to rice, sorghum and other cultivations. These methods are believed to have resulted in gains of 1200 million dollars annually in benefits. This method is now used to control orobanche in Mediterranean areas Spain, Eastern Europe and Russia, and has attracted interest internationally. Then he was named "Mayegun" in Nigeria, meaning "Who feed poors". In 1986 he received the International Prize of Agrarian Investigation from the King of Belgium, with other prizes from other countries. Numerous companies asked Kim to join them, but he always denied and stayed in IITA. It was around this time that starvation in North Korea became a more pressing issue. It was a difficult decision to quit IITA and go to Kyungpook, where he received wage 4 times less, but he thought that such efforts might spur accelerated Korean reunification. He founded the International Foundation of the Corn in March 1998 and became the director of the organization. Thanks to numerous sponsors he continued researching corn to help North Korea and countries in the Third World.

== Sources ==
Koreana, Arte y Cultura de Corea

http://starbulletin.com/97/04/17/news/story3.html

== See also ==
- International Corn Foundation
