= Baranger Studios =

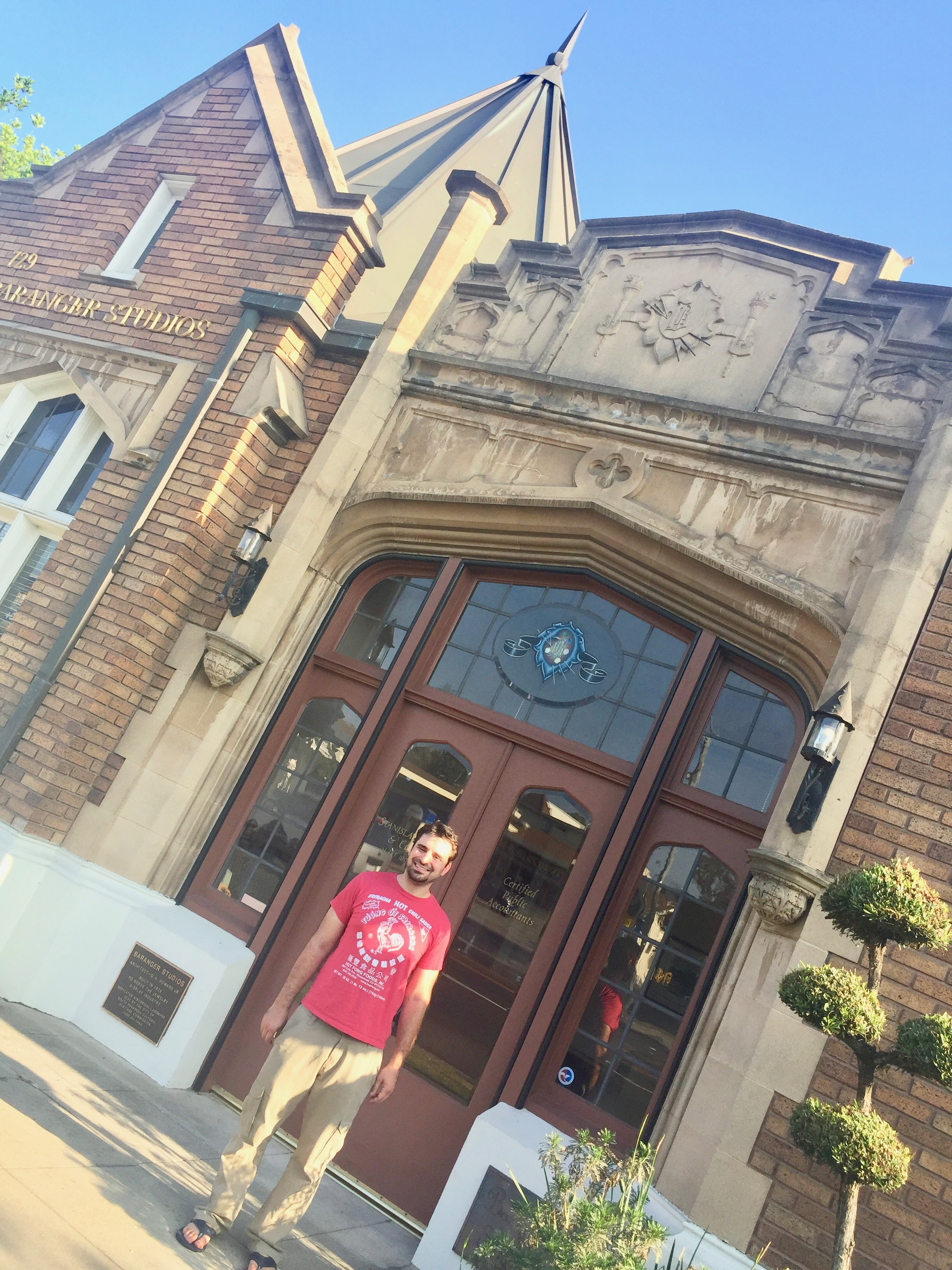
The Baranger Studios Building in South Pasadena, CA.

Baranger Motion machines or "Baranger Motions" were store-window mechanical animated advertising displays rented to jewellers. They were produced from 1937 to 1959 by the Baranger Company of South Pasadena, California United States. The dimensions of one typical "motion" were 21 inches (53 cm) wide, 12 inches (30 cm) tall, and 12 inches (30 cm) deep.

== History ==
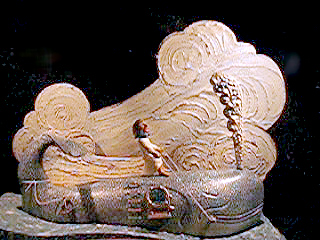
A Baranger Motion. In operation, the whale rocks back and forth.

Their appearance was toy-like, cartoonish, or Art Deco, and they featured simple, repetitive motions performed by the doll-like sculptures. No brand names or jeweller's names appeared on the displays; most of them pitched the generic idea of buying diamonds or watches. A typical motion showed technicians working on a "diamond reactor" with dials labelled "fire" and "sparkle," and a plaque noting that "Your diamond will appear much larger in one of our modern mountings." Many depicted couples courting or honeymooning, often in fanciful surroundings such as a Well Fargo stagecoach. Placards often suggested that a diamond could facilitate a favorable courtship outcome: "You will always be on the right road with one of our beautiful diamonds." One is described by a dealer:

1950s USA Baranger CO's RARE Honeymoon Motion Rocket- As seen in Kitahra's Book Yesterdays Toys. This is one of perhaps 6 or 7 Surviving rare Baranger Motion Display Rockets. Moon Rotates as rocket pitches & Yaws up & down. Honeymoon couple turn towards each other & pilots turns head to look at the couple. Amazing Electric Powered action. Probably the 1st or 2nd most coveted of all the baranger displays. Buck Rogers inspired rocket design with beautiful Art Deco period touches.

The displays were designed by Arch E. Baranger, Hazel J. Baranger and Robert Gerlach and manufactured in runs of about 30 each. A total of 167 different designs were produced. The displays were never sold but rented to jewellers under a contract in which the displays were rotated monthly, each jeweller returning the old one and receiving a new one to display.

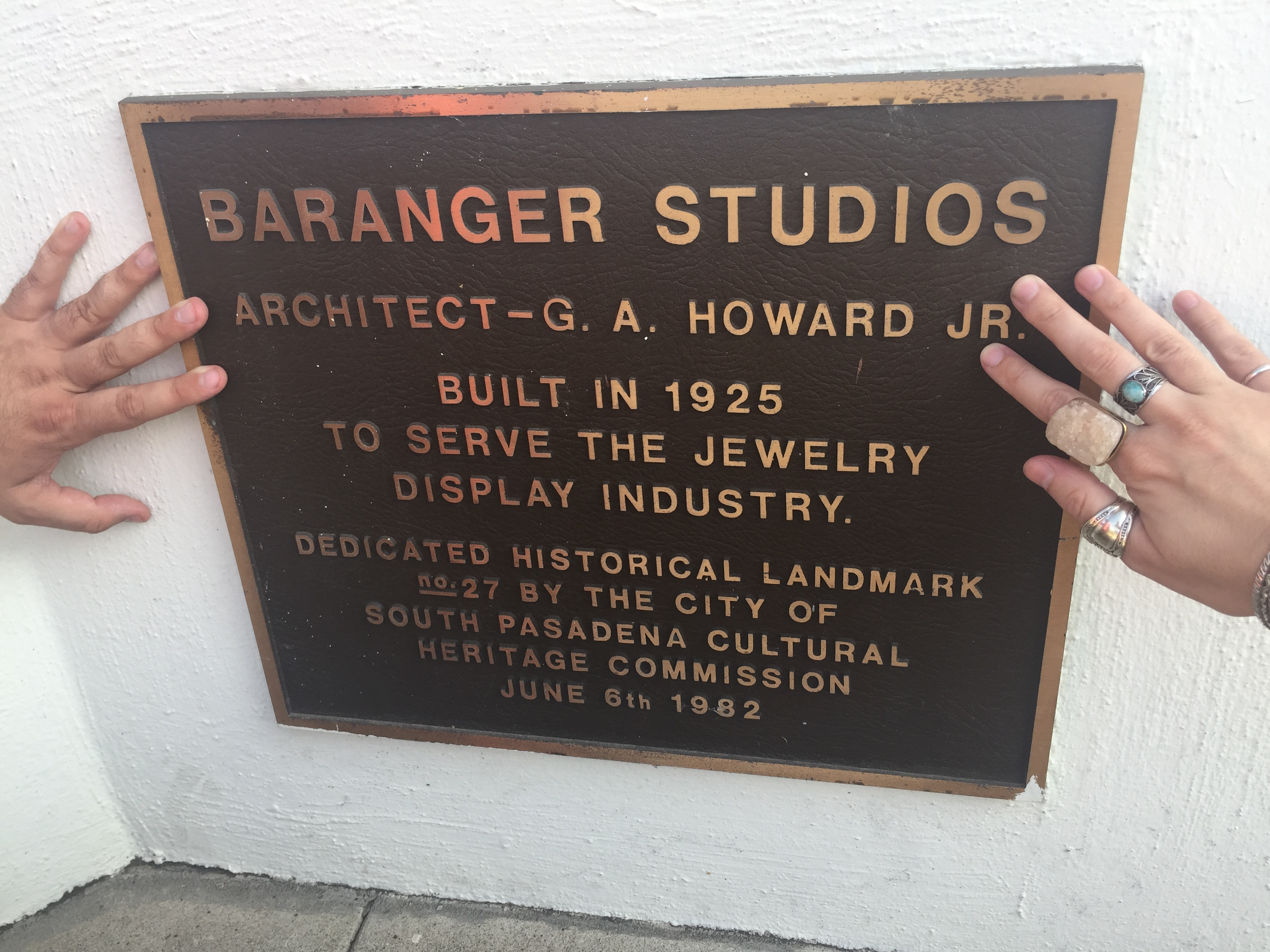
Baranger Studios historical plaque.

Collectors of these motions prize them highly, and as of 2006 they appear to command mid-four-figure asking prices; one sold in 2005 for $6500.

The Baranger Studios building itself is well known in South Pasadena, and some cited it as their favorite building in one survey.

About a hundred of the motions are displayed in the Circus Building of the House on the Rock, a tourist attraction in Spring Green, Wisconsin.

A larger collection of 130 of the motions is featured in the Michael Pollack Advertising Museum.
