= Range Riders =

The Range Riders

The Range Riders are an American musical group. Their family-friendly music blends gospel, country and western music.

Officially re-formed on 18 August 1981, the Range Riders emerged from the western music and singing cowboy era of the early 1930s. There have been many versions of this group over the years. Range Riders have been included with the Singing Cowboy Groups http://www.b-westerns.com/singing3.htm One of their members, Roland Fraser, 91, has been involved with this group since the 1940s. The Range Riders' Anniversary concert in 2011 was Roland Fraser's last event with the group before retiring.

Range Riders represent many decades of musical history, beginning in the 1930s and ranging to the present day. But, for the past 32 years, the group has been sustained by the Hanna family, which has carried on the musical tradition over three decades. Phyllis was a dominant member of the group.

The Range Riders introduced a blend of western harmonies coupled with country styles to form a signature sound known as "cowboy music".

The Range Riders have toured extensively over the decades, performing on local and regional TV and radio shows, fairs and large concert venues, and sharing the stage with performers such as Country Star, David Frizzell, Roy Clark, Al Petty, James Blackwood and the Blackwood Brothers, Max Crook (cowriter of the 1961 Del Shannon hit Runaway), Vern Jackson and others.

According to an article By Johnny Meza, for the Desert Entertainer, Jesse, who plays piano and guitar, handles the lead singing chores along with warming up the audience before the show with some comedy and great one-liners. Missing from the group was their recently departed father Jesse, guitarist and singer, whose influence is still wonderfully evident.

Mother Phyllis Hanna sings and plays rhythm guitar, sister Nokomis plays bass, brother David plays drums, another sister, Rosanell, sings and long time friend 'Uncle' Roland Fraser sings and plays the lead guitar.

The Range Riders show features a wide variety of music. From Country to Rock and Roll, ballads and cowboy infused Gospel. They also feature a guest artist every month and recently, vocalist extraordinaire June Wade put on a performance that garnered several standing ovations.

Phyllis Hanna, 32-year veteran performer with the country/gospel group Range Riders, died from recovery complications following surgeries for a dissected aorta Monday, Oct. 7, 2013, at the age of 79. She was a lifetime resident of California and a 35-year resident of Sky Valley.

== History ==
The musical group Range Riders emerged from the Western Music and singing‑cowboy era of the early 1930s. Roland Fraser, who joined the group in the late 1940s, retired in 2011 after decades of performing with the group.

== Musical Styles and Influences ==
The Range Riders combine gospel, country, and western music into a style often called “cowboy music,” featuring vocal harmony and traditional instrumentation. They have shared the stage with artists such as Roy Clark and David Frizzell.

== Members ==
- Jesse Hanna—Keyboards, guitar, vocals 1981–present
- Phyllis Hanna—Rhythm guitar, vocals 1981 - 2013
- Nokomis Hanna—Bass guitar, vocals 1981–present
- David Hanna—Drums, vocals 1981–present
- Rosanell Hanna—Vocals 1981–present
- Mann Hanna-Harmonica, Vocals 1981 - 2004
- Roland Fraser—Lead guitar, vocals circa 1950 - 1981 - 2011

== Performances & Major Appearances ==
Over the decades, the group toured extensively across the U.S., performing on television and radio, at fairs and large concert venues.
