= Pasadena Humane =

American nonprofit organization

Pasadena Humane, formerly the Pasadena Humane Society & SPCA, is a non-profit organization headquartered in Pasadena, California. It operates an animal shelter and provides animal control services.

The organization contracts its services with the following municipalities in Los Angeles County: Arcadia, Bradbury, Duarte, Glendale, La Cañada Flintridge, Monrovia, Pasadena, San Marino, Sierra Madre, and South Pasadena. It also covers the unincorporated areas of Altadena and La Crescenta-Montrose. It covers unincorporated areas with post office addresses reflecting most of the beforehand places, but not those with Arcadia nor Monrovia postal addresses.

== History ==
The shelter began operations in 1907. Initially the organization held homeless human babies.

In 1993 the shelter facility was to have a total of 10,000 square feet (930 m^{2}) of space after having an addition that was to cost a total of $4,300,000. In 1993 Renee Tawa of the Los Angeles Times stated that the shelter was within "a nationwide movement toward kinder, gentler animal centers."

In 2002, of the dogs taken into the Pasadena shelter, 10% were euthanized. James Ricci, of the same newspaper, stated in 2002 that the Pasadena shelter was "a sharp contrast" to Los Angeles Animal Services and other typical municipal animal shelters.
