= Mountain Views News =

Newspaper published in Sierra Madre, California

- Where your community news comes first
- Type: Weekly newspaper
- Owner: Susan Henderson
- Founded: 1906 (as Sierra Madre News)
- Language: English
- City: Sierra Madre, California
- Country: United States
- Website: mtnviewsnews.com

The Mountain Views News is a weekly newspaper published in Sierra Madre, California. It covers the northern San Gabriel Valley, including the cities of Sierra Madre, Pasadena, Altadena, South Pasadena, San Marino, Arcadia, Monrovia and Duarte.

== History ==
In 1906, the Sierra Madre News was established. In February 1907, editor R.T. Cowles left the News to establish the Rialto Weekly Dispatch in Rialto, California. In April 1908, C.W, Hill sold the paper to George B. Morgridge. in December 1915, Morgridge was appointed as the town's postmaster. J. Fred Whitting became editor around 1918 and was succeeded by Leo Eldridge Sharp in November 1920.

A joint-stock company called Sierra Madre Press, Inc. formed in August 1921 and assumed control of the News. In January 1922, Morgridge resigned as postmaster and returned to the News as its manager and editor. In June 1926, Morgridge and Joe R. Eastwood acquired all company stock. In May 1929, Joseph L. Ashbury bought out Morgridge, officially ending his continuous connection to the paper after two decades.

Burton L. Smith hands a trophy to Joe E. Eastwood in 1927 for winning the Los Angeles Times’ "Best-First-Page Award," with George B. Morgridge in the center looking on.

In February 1930, Lawrence R. Goshorn acquired the News. Goshorn published the News for 14 years until August 1944 when he sold it to Clifford C. Ward. Goshorn sold the paper due to declining health and died in January 1946 at age 70. Ward died in June 1949. His widow then sold the News to their son, Peter Ward. The paper was then acquired by Edgar Jenkinson in September 1953, Harry Elwood in October 1955, Edward E. Herwig in December 1959, and R. Robert Evans in June 1962.

Evans was named "Citizen of the Year" by the Sierra Madre Chamber of Commerce in January 1978, which led him to being profiled in the Los Angeles Times. At that time the News had a circulation of 12,000. Evans, who wrote a column under the pen name "Carrot Top," was a controversial figure among some locals. His appointment to the city's Planning Commission was rescinded in March 1980 after public backlash. One resident attorney filed a petition claiming Evans' appointment constituted a conflict of interest. By that September, Evans had sold the News to the owners of the San Marino Tribune after 18 years of ownership. At that time Jannene G. "Jan" Reed was named editor and publisher.

Reed soon became the owner and by 1990 circulation had shrunk to 4,000. At that time George Maurer, who was the town's current mayor and had worked at the paper's printing plant for 28 years, sued the News for age discrimination. Maurer, age 67, claimed he was fired due to his age, allegations which Reed, age 61, denied. Maurer lost his case in arbitration, but then sought a jury trial, seeking $200,000 in damages. Reed accumulated $40,000 in legal fees which left her unable to cover the paper's financial obligation. Faced with potential closure, a group of locals formed a grassroots organization called "Friends of the Sierra Madre News" with their goal to save the paper.

In July 1993, an anonymous benefactor loaned Reed enough money to publish for another few months. Eventually Maurer and Reed reached an undisclosed settlement outside of court. In November 1994, Michael De Wees, age 25, bought the News and Reed stayed on as advertising manager. At that time the News had 15 employees and a 3,000 circulation. The sale price was $85,000, with much of the money borrowed from Reed.

Some residents and employees criticized De Wees for publishing stories they thought were too negative. He wrote articles critical of City Hall and published letters critical of local businesses. In 1996, general manager Von Raees quit after a dispute with De Wees and then started a rival paper called the Arcadia Weekly with a 15,000 circulation. That same year, Reed sued De Wees for $22,000 still owed for the paper's sale and for allegedly underpaying her $10,000.

In 1997, De Wees declared personal bankruptcy, citing $96,000 in debts. That same year, local gas station owner Frank "Moe" Marshal pulled out his ads from the News due dissatisfaction over negative coverage and launched another rival paper called the Mountain Views. Editor Beth Buck soon acquired the paper and grew circulation to 5,000. Both the Weekly and the Views were free, while the News made plans to also switch from subscription to free to better compete. In July 1999, after 92 years in business, the News, which locals nicknamed "The Squawk", ceased. Buck made several offers to buy the News it's closure, but when De Wees asked for $90,000, she declined.

In 2003, Buck sold the Views to Steve Tobia, who turned the paper into a magazine. In October 2006, Susan Henderson and Katina Dunn launched a rival paper called The Mt. Wilson Observer. In May 2007, Dunn left the paper. In August 2007, Henderson acquired the Views from Tobia and merged the two publications to form the Mountain Views-Observer. In April 2009, the paper was renamed to the Mountain Views News.
