= Sierra Madre, California =

City in California, United States

- City
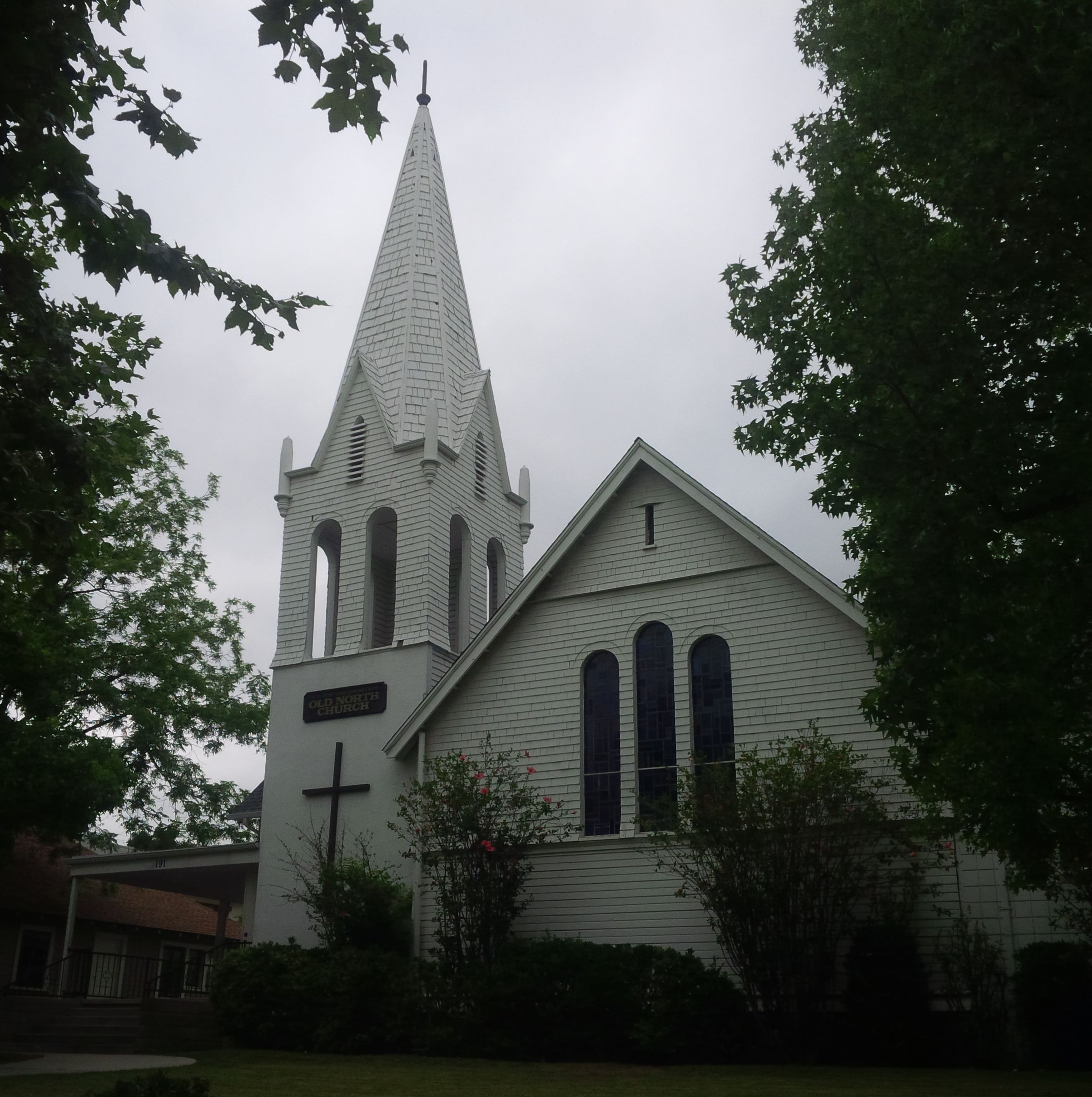

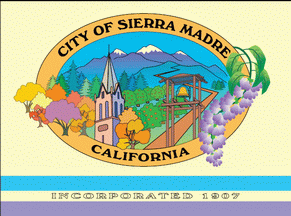
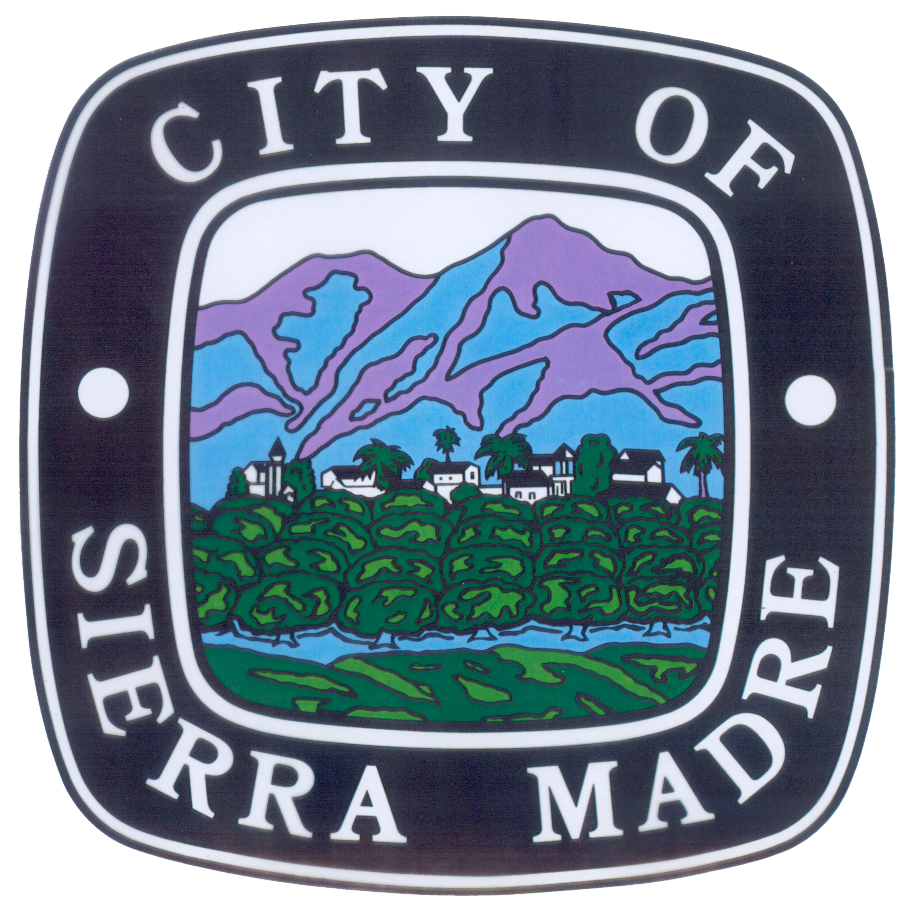
- Flag Seal
- Motto: "Village of the Foothills"
- Interactive map of Sierra Madre, California
- Location in the United States
- Coordinates: 34°9′53″N 118°3′3″W
- Country: United States
- State: California
- County: Los Angeles
- Incorporated: February 2, 1907

Government
  - Type: Council–manager
  - Mayor: Robert Parkhurst
  - Mayor Pro Tem: Kristine Lowe

Area
  - Total: 2.95 sq mi (7.65 km^{2})
  - Land: 2.95 sq mi (7.64 km^{2})
  - Water: 0.0039 sq mi (0.01 km^{2}) 0.15%
- Elevation: 827 ft (252 m)

Population (2020)
  - Total: 11,268
  - Estimate (2024): 10,775
  - Density: 3,657/sq mi (1,412.1/km^{2})
- Time zone: UTC-8 (PST)
  - Summer (DST): UTC-7 (PDT)
- ZIP codes: 91024, 91025
- Area code: 626
- FIPS code: 06-71806
- GNIS feature IDs: 1661439, 2411897
- Website: www.sierramadreca.gov

Sierra Madre (Spanish for "mother range") is a city in Los Angeles County, California, United States, with a population of 11,268 at the time of the 2020 U.S. Census. The city is in the foothills of the San Gabriel Valley below the southern edge of the Angeles National Forest. Pasadena and Altadena are to its west, with Arcadia to its south and east. Sierra Madre is known as "Wisteria City", and its city seal is decorated with a drawing of the now widely known 500-foot (150 m) vine. It is also called the "Village of the Foothills" and was an All-America City in 2007.

== History ==
=== Early history ===
In approximately 500 CE, Tongva Indians, the native people migrated from the Mojave area to what would become Los Angeles County (including the San Gabriel Valley). Their name means "People of the Earth". Their primary language was Uto-Aztecan Shoshonean. In the 16th century, there were about 25 Tongva villages, with a population of approximately 400 people. By 1769, the first Spanish settlers arrived in the region, finding an estimated 5,000 Tongva living in 31 villages. Sierra Madre was the site of a settlement named Sonayna. Two years later, Mission San Gabriel Arcangel was founded in present-day Montebello. The mission was later moved to San Gabriel because of severe flooding from the Rio Hondo River, which ruined their crops. The original mission site is now marked by a California Historical Landmark. Tongvas were integrated into the culture of the mission, and the tribe were renamed Gabrielino Indians by the Spaniards. The first Mount Wilson trail was carved by the Gabrielino Indians, who used it when they carried timber down from the mountains for the construction of the San Gabriel Mission in 1771.

Using Mexican and Chinese laborers, Benjamin "Don Benito" Wilson expanded the Mount Wilson Trail in 1864. Nathaniel Carter purchased the original 1,103 acres (4.46 km^{2}) that comprise Sierra Madre in 1881: 845 acres (3.42 km^{2}) from "Lucky Baldwin", 108 acres (0.44 km^{2}) from the Southern Pacific Railroad Company, and 150 acres (0.61 km^{2}) from John Richardson (1811–August 9, 1884). In 1888, the Santa Anita railroad station was built. The first of the year brought Pacific Electric Railway Red Car passenger service to Sierra Madre. Later that year the first electric lights were installed by the Edison Electric Company. In December 1906, the first telephones were installed (250 of them) by the Home Telephone Company of Monrovia.

On February 2, 1907, the first citywide election was held and 96 citizens voted 71–25 to officially incorporate Sierra Madre; the population was about 500. In February 1907, eighteen days after the election, Sierra Madre became incorporated as a California city. Charles Worthington Jones was the first mayor.

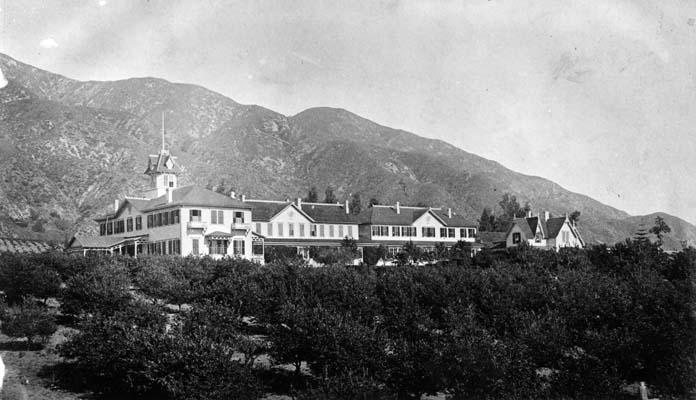
The Sierra Madre Villa Hotel, 1884

=== The new century ===
Sierra Madre is historically linked to the old mountain resorts of the San Gabriel Mountains and Valley. The Sierra Madre Villa Hotel was a pioneer of summer resorts that populated the San Gabriel Valley in the late 19th century. The municipality also operated and maintained the landmark "Lizzie's Trail" inn at the head of Old Mount Wilson Trail.

Harvard College established the first Mount Wilson Observatory in 1889. The installation of the Harvard telescope in 1889, which brought its own problems of transporting the instrument up the old Wilson trail, caused an interest in a Mt. Wilson roadway, something more than a trail. The Harvard telescope was removed and in July the new toll road was officially opened to the public. The toll was set by the Los Angeles County Board of Supervisors at 25 cents for hikers and 50 cents for horseback. The new road was called the "New Mt. Wilson Trail" and it was more popular at the time than the old Sierra Madre trail. Foot and pack animal traffic became so heavy that in June 1893 the trail was widened to six feet (1.8 m). The Pacific Electric "Red Cars" established their route to Sierra Madre from 1906 until 1950. Thousands of people rode the cars to Sierra Madre to hike the original Mt. Wilson Trail.

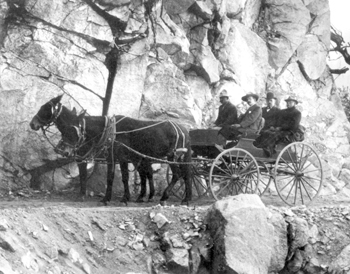
Horse and buggy passage on the Mount Wilson Trail

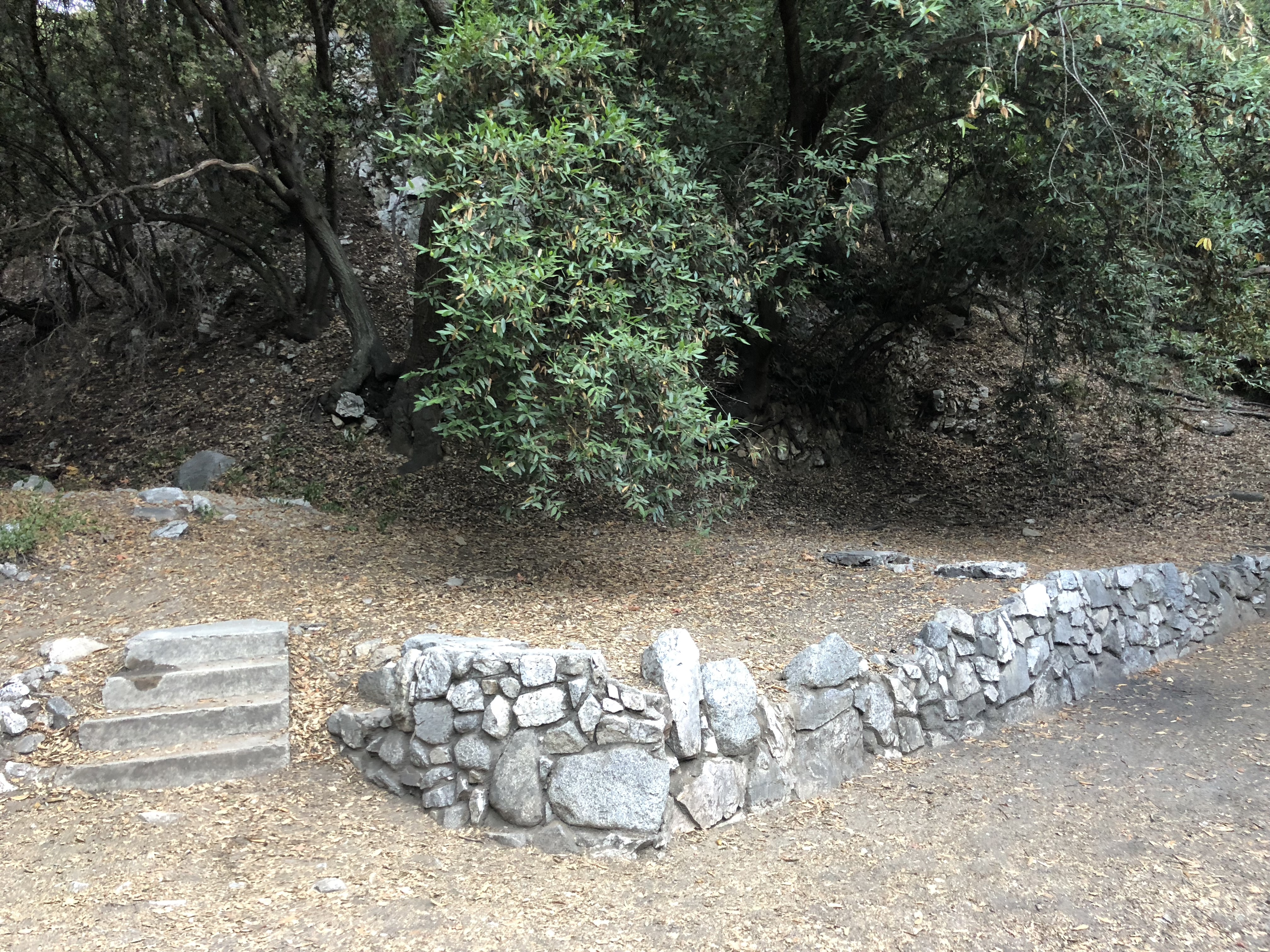
The ruins of Orchard Camp can still be visited on the Mt. Wilson Trail.

In 1908, the first Mt. Wilson Trail Race was run. This annual race was discontinued during WWII and reestablished in 1966. The 102nd anniversary of the first running of the Mount Wilson Trail Race and the 44th annual race was run in May 2010. Because of rain, mudslides, falling trees, soil erosion and rockslides, the regularly monitored trail course changes almost every year, and no official records of running times are kept. The 8.6-mile (13.8 km) course starts and ends on pavement, but most of the race is run on a dirt path about three feet (0.91 m) wide, and the Mt. Wilson Trail has occasional steep vertical drops of hundreds of feet. Due to the trail's narrowness and steepness, the race is limited to 300 male and 300 female runners. The path gains elevation to more than 2,100 feet (640 m); at 4.3 miles (6.9 km) from the start of the race is Orchard Camp, the turnaround point. Scout troops hike up to provide water at two locations, at the 2.3-mile (3.7 km) point and at the Orchard Camp turnaround. The Sierra Madre Search and Rescue Team provides emergency support on race day. The Mt. Wilson Trail Race has traditional and historical value to the community.

A year after the city's incorporation, Catholic families contacted a priest from Chicago, Father M. W. Barth, who had moved west for his health, to ask if he could celebrate Mass for them. The construction of the first, very small, church of St. Rita's parish, founded by Barth in 1908, was completed in 1910. In 1922, St. Rita's Catholic Church parochial school opened. During the first 100 years of St. Rita's Parish, it has on record 4,075 baptisms, 3,590 confirmations, 1,334 marriages and 1,469 funerals. The scattering of families that began with Barth in 1908 has grown to more than 1,200 Catholic parish homes today, in a city whose population is now approximately 10,917.

In 1914, after a long legal battle, the city acquired title to all water rights, lands, and distribution systems of the Baldwin Estate and the Sierra Madre Water Company.

In 1917, E. Waldo Ward & Son was established in Sierra Madre, an artisanal preserves and specialty food company that operates in the present day and is run by E. Waldo Ward descendants.

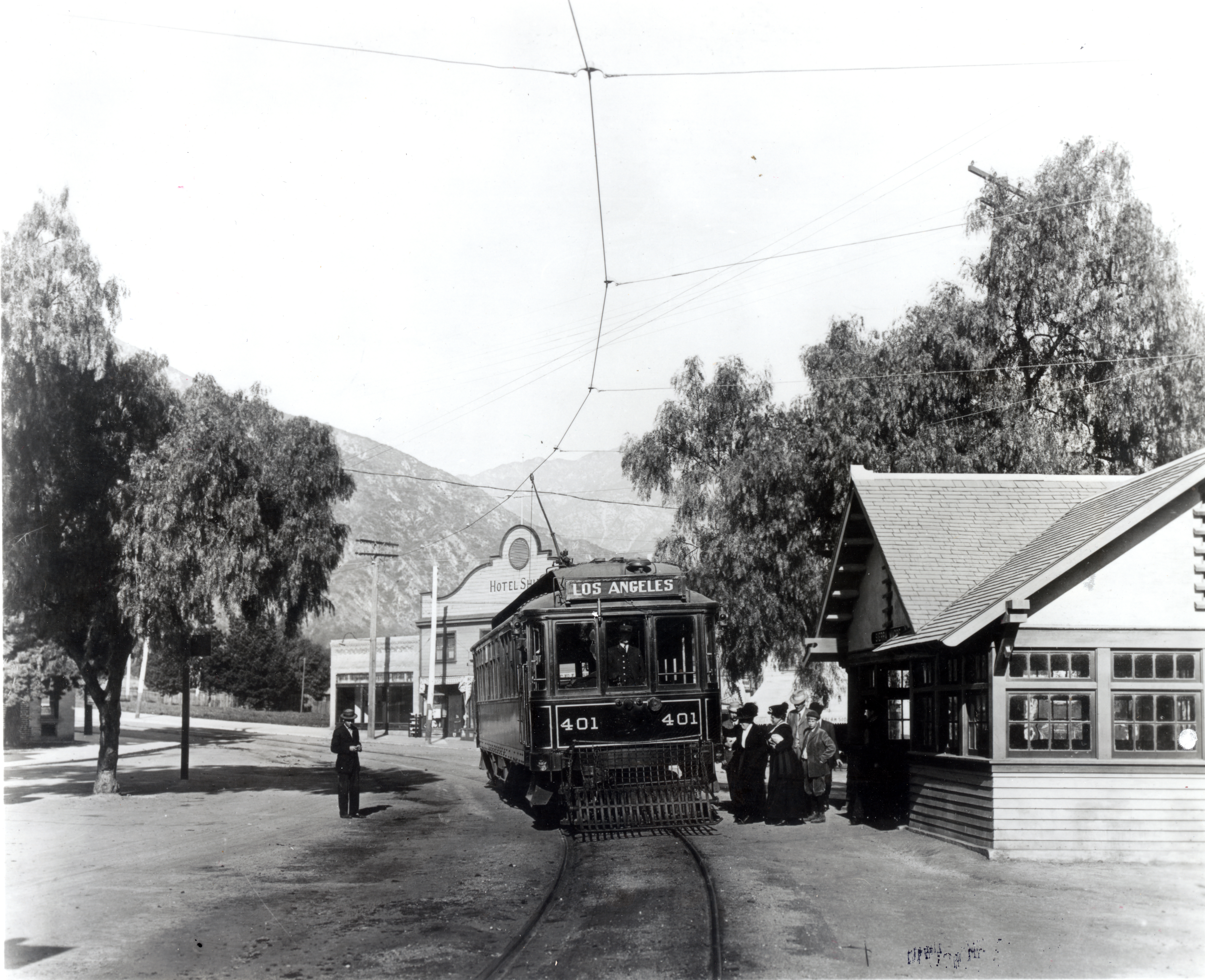
Sierra Madre c. 1908 with PE line Depot and the Hotel Shirley in background

==== 1920s and 1930s ====
In 1921, a disastrous bakery fire at Windsor Lane and Montecito Court prompted the official organization of the Sierra Madre Volunteer Fire Department. Sierra Madre had the last remaining volunteer fire department in greater Los Angeles before transitioning to a paid department in 2017.

On January 1, 1922, Bethany Temple was dedicated. The now historic domed cobblestone church was designed and built by the nearly blind Louis D. Corneulle. The new Congregational Church structure was completed on Sierra Madre Ave; the Romanesque Revival building was designed by Marsh, Smith, & Powell. In July 1927, the Sierra Madre Kiwanis Club was formed. On April 21, 1931, the first meeting of the Sierra Madre Historical Society took place, in conjunction with the city's 50th anniversary celebration. In 1936, a city ordinance officially changed the name of Central Avenue to Sierra Madre Blvd. In March 1938, a disastrous storm and the resulting flood destroyed many resorts in the local mountains, and also ravaged the (John) Muir Lodge in Big Santa Anita Canyon above Sierra Madre. No trace remains of it today. In 1940, the city purchased 760 acres (3.1 km^{2}) of land in the San Gabriel Mountains near Orchard Camp to avoid contamination of the water supply.

A six-week Wisteria event took place in the 1930s. The crowds that traveled to see the giant Wisteria vine were estimated at over 100,000. With so many visitors, extra "Red Cars" were put on the Pacific Electric route to Sierra Madre.

==== 1940s ====
Sierra Madre one-room school house in 1881, at the corner of Hermosa and Grove Grove. Grove Grove was called Live Oak in 1881

On May 14, 1942, Sierra Madre's Japanese population was required to depart for the detention facility in Tulare. During this decade, Sierra Madre Civic Club and the Sierra Madre Lions Club were organized. The Sierra Madre Community Nursery School also opened. In May 1947, the first Pioneer Days Parade was held. The heaviest recorded snow in Sierra Madre occurred in 1949, blanketing the town with 3 to 4 inches (7.6 to 10.2 cm) of snow overnight.

In 1948, the U.S. Supreme Court, in the case of Shelley v. Kraemer, ended racially restrictive covenants that had prevented black people from owning homes in Sierra Madre and some neighboring cities. However, residential segregation patterns had already become established and persisted up until 1968 when realtors began to routinely show homes to black people.

==== Mid-century ====
On October 6, 1950, the last Pacific Electric train left from Sierra Madre. In 1951, Sierra Madre Search and Rescue Team was established by Larry Shepherd and Fred LaLone. Sierra Madre joined the Pasadena Unified School District in 1961. In 1967, Princess Margaret visited the British Home in Sierra Madre. The Cultural Heritage Committee was established in 1969 by the Sierra Madre City Council with the intent of "defining cultural and aesthetic landmarks throughout the City of Sierra Madre and to recommend how such landmarks be preserved." In 1969, the city purchased the Women's Clubhouse, to be demolished and become the site of a new City Hall building.

The Sierra Madre Historical Wilderness Area was established by declaration of the City Council on January 24, 1967. When it was dedicated on January 27, 1968, Sierra Madre was the first city in Southern California to own a wilderness preserve. The Sierra Madre City Council added the Mt. Wilson Trail to the Sierra Madre Register of Historic Cultural Landmarks on October 12, 1993.

==== 1970s ====
In January 1971, the Sierra Madre Environmental Action Council was formed. In 1974, the Bell Tower in Kersting Court was dedicated; it houses the original school bell from the 1885 schoolhouse. In 1976, Sierra Madre Vistas was published by the Sierra Madre Historical Preservation Society. On March 19, 1976, the Bicentennial time capsule was buried beneath the flagpole at the new Fire and Police Department Facility, then dedicated in May. The New City Hall building was dedicated on Sierra Madre Boulevard in 1977.

==== 1980s and 1990s ====
In 1981, Sierra Madre celebrated the centennial of its founding, complete with a Centennial Royal Court and dance, a special Historical Society dinner, and rides on a Pacific Electric red car brought back to town on Independence Day weekend.

==== Recent history ====
In 2003, the groundbreaking ceremony for the Senior Housing Project on Esperanza Avenue was held. The affordable housing project includes 46 units designed by PBWS Architects and developed by the Foundation for Quality Housing. Later that year, the Veterans' Photo Wall, spearheaded by John Grijalva, was dedicated in Memorial Park. In 2007, Sierra Madre celebrated the centennial of its incorporation as a California city. Sierra Madre also won the All-America City Award given by the National Civic League. That same year, the refurbished World War I cannon in Memorial Park was dedicated.

In March 2008, the Milton & Harriet Goldberg Recreation Area was dedicated, as the city's first such pocket park in over 30 years. In 2009, the Sierra Madre Historical Preservation Society published Southern California Story: Seeking the Better Life in Sierra Madre by Michele Zack.

In 2023, the city asked the California Department of Fish and Wildlife to change its approach to dealing with bears in the city.

== Geography and climate ==
According to the United States Census Bureau, the town has a total area of 3.0 square miles (7.7 km^{2} (3.0 sq mi), of which (7.7 km^{2}) is land, and 0.15% is water.

Sierra Madre has warm, dry summers, and cool, wet winters (Mediterranean climate type). Annual precipitation is approximately 24 inches, mostly falling between November and March. In fall months, a Southern California phenomenon called the Santa Ana winds can bring daytime temperatures into the 80s year round, and keep overnight lows above 60, even in winter. Winter, however, mostly consists of cool, rainy days followed by warm sunny ones. Frosts are not very common, with snow only being recorded on three occasions. By May, Pacific storms no longer visit the region. In May and June, hot desert temperatures combined with cool ocean waters bring in low hanging clouds each morning called the Marine Layer. They dissipate by noon. These clouds make June the cloudiest month for Sierra Madre, even though it only receives an average 0.20" of rain in June. From July through October, hot temperatures grip the region, with September being the hottest month, unlike the rest of the nation. During this period, it rarely rains.

Climate data for Sierra Madre, California (1897–1958 averages)
| Month | Jan | Feb | Mar | Apr | May | Jun | Jul | Aug | Sep | Oct | Nov | Dec | Year |
|---|---|---|---|---|---|---|---|---|---|---|---|---|---|
| Record high °F (°C) | 93 (34) | 92 (33) | 98 (37) | 105 (41) | 104 (40) | 113 (45) | 118 (48) | 117 (47) | 111 (44) | 108 (42) | 101 (38) | 93 (34) | 118 (48) |
| Mean daily maximum °F (°C) | 63.8 (17.7) | 65.2 (18.4) | 67.5 (19.7) | 71.1 (21.7) | 74.1 (23.4) | 80.4 (26.9) | 88.2 (31.2) | 88.5 (31.4) | 86.0 (30.0) | 78.7 (25.9) | 73.2 (22.9) | 66.4 (19.1) | 75.3 (24.0) |
| Mean daily minimum °F (°C) | 45.1 (7.3) | 45.6 (7.6) | 46.7 (8.2) | 48.9 (9.4) | 51.3 (10.7) | 54.5 (12.5) | 59.1 (15.1) | 59.8 (15.4) | 58.7 (14.8) | 55.0 (12.8) | 51.6 (10.9) | 47.2 (8.4) | 52.5 (11.4) |
| Record low °F (°C) | 21 (−6) | 26 (−3) | 29 (−2) | 31 (−1) | 32 (0) | 41 (5) | 45 (7) | 43 (6) | 41 (5) | 36 (2) | 26 (−3) | 25 (−4) | 21 (−6) |
| Average rainfall inches (mm) | 4.93 (125) | 4.68 (119) | 4.17 (106) | 2.11 (54) | 0.85 (22) | 0.20 (5.1) | 0.03 (0.76) | 0.06 (1.5) | 0.38 (9.7) | 1.06 (27) | 1.77 (45) | 3.79 (96) | 24.03 (611.06) |
| Average snowfall inches (cm) | 0.4 (1.0) | 0.0 (0.0) | 0.0 (0.0) | 0.0 (0.0) | 0.0 (0.0) | 0.0 (0.0) | 0.0 (0.0) | 0.0 (0.0) | 0.0 (0.0) | 0.0 (0.0) | 0.0 (0.0) | 0.0 (0.0) | 0.4 (1.0) |

The 1991 Sierra Madre earthquake was a M 5.8 tremor that hit at 07:43:55 local time on June 28, 1991. It caused regional damage, such as knocking over chimneys and fragmenting cinder block walls that run along major roads in the area.

Sierra Madre lies between Santa Anita Blvd. to the east and Michillinda Ave. to the west. To the south, it is bordered by Orange Grove Blvd. Its principal road is Sierra Madre Blvd.

== Demographics ==
Historical population
| Census | Pop. | Note | %± |
|---|---|---|---|
| 1910 | 1,303 | | — |
| 1920 | 2,026 | | 55.5% |
| 1930 | 3,550 | | 75.2% |
| 1940 | 4,581 | | 29.0% |
| 1950 | 7,273 | | 58.8% |
| 1960 | 9,732 | | 33.8% |
| 1970 | 12,140 | | 24.7% |
| 1980 | 10,837 | | −10.7% |
| 1990 | 10,762 | | −0.7% |
| 2000 | 10,578 | | −1.7% |
| 2010 | 10,917 | | 3.2% |
| 2020 | 11,268 | | 3.2% |
U.S. Decennial Census; 1860–1870 1880–1890; 1900 1910 1920; 1930 1940 1950; 1960 1970 1980; 1990 2000 2010; 2020

Sierra Madre first appeared as a city in the 1910 U.S. census.

=== Racial and ethnic composition ===
Sierra Madre city, California – Racial and ethnic composition Note: the US Census treats Hispanic/Latino as an ethnic category. This table excludes Latinos from the racial categories and assigns them to a separate category. Hispanics/Latinos may be of any race.
| Race / Ethnicity (NH = Non-Hispanic) | Pop 1980 | Pop 1990 | Pop 2000 | Pop 2010 | Pop 2020 | % 1980 | % 1990 | % 2000 | % 2010 | % 2020 |
|---|---|---|---|---|---|---|---|---|---|---|
| White alone (NH) | 9,718 | 9,059 | 8,435 | 7,891 | 7,046 | 89.67% | 84.18% | 79.74% | 72.28% | 62.53% |
| Black or African American alone (NH) | 54 | 90 | 113 | 191 | 153 | 0.50% | 0.84% | 1.07% | 1.75% | 1.36% |
| Native American or Alaska Native alone (NH) | 7 | 31 | 24 | 30 | 20 | 0.06% | 0.29% | 0.23% | 0.27% | 0.18% |
| Asian alone (NH) | 285 | 527 | 588 | 815 | 1,408 | 2.63% | 4.90% | 5.56% | 7.47% | 12.50% |
| Native Hawaiian or Pacific Islander alone (NH) | 285 | 527 | 11 | 8 | 10 | 2.63% | 4.90% | 0.10% | 0.07% | 0.09% |
| Other race alone (NH) | 5 | 5 | 38 | 39 | 67 | 0.04% | 0.05% | 0.36% | 0.36% | 0.59% |
| Mixed race or Multiracial (NH) | x | x | 315 | 315 | 641 | x | x | 2.98% | 2.89% | 5.69% |
| Hispanic or Latino (any race) | 768 | 1,050 | 1,054 | 1,628 | 1,923 | 7.09% | 9.76% | 9.96% | 14.91% | 17.07% |
| Total | 10,837 | 10,762 | 10,578 | 10,917 | 11,268 | 100.00% | 100.00% | 100.00% | 100.00% | 100.00% |

=== 2020 census ===
As of the 2020 census, Sierra Madre had a population of 11,268 and a population density of 3,818.4 inhabitants per square mile (1,474.3/km^{2}). The racial makeup of Sierra Madre was 66.5% White, 1.6% African American, 0.6% Native American, 12.8% Asian, 0.1% Pacific Islander, 4.3% from other races, and 14.1% from two or more races. Hispanic or Latino of any race were 17.1% of the population.

The age distribution was 18.9% under the age of 18, 5.6% aged 18 to 24, 21.1% aged 25 to 44, 30.4% aged 45 to 64, and 24.1% who were 65 years of age or older. The median age was 48.3 years. For every 100 females, there were 87.5 males, and for every 100 females age 18 and over, there were 85.5 males age 18 and over.

The census reported that 99.3% of the population lived in households and 0.7% were institutionalized. The city was entirely urban, with 100.0% of residents living in urban areas and 0.0% living in rural areas.

There were 4,838 households, out of which 28.5% included children under the age of 18, 49.5% were married-couple households, 5.1% were cohabiting couple households, 29.6% had a female householder with no spouse or partner present, and 15.8% had a male householder with no spouse or partner present. 30.5% of households were made up of individuals, and 14.8% had someone living alone aged 65 or older. The average household size was 2.31. There were 3,103 families (64.1% of all households).

There were 5,095 housing units at an average density of 1,726.5 units per square mile (666.6 units/km^{2}), of which 4,838 (95.0%) were occupied. Of these, 61.4% were owner-occupied, and 38.6% were occupied by renters. The homeowner vacancy rate was 0.8%, and the rental vacancy rate was 3.2%.

=== 2023 ACS estimates ===
In 2023, the US Census Bureau estimated that the median household income was $141,094, and the per capita income was $83,522. About 3.8% of families and 4.8% of the population were below the poverty line.

=== 2010 census ===
The 2010 United States census reported that Sierra Madre had a population of 10,917. The population density was 3,692.0 inhabitants per square mile (1,425.5/km^{2}). The racial makeup of Sierra Madre was 8,967 (82.1%) White (72.3% Non-Hispanic White), 201 (1.8%) African American, 44 (0.4%) Native American, 835 (7.6%) Asian, 9 (0.1%) Pacific Islander, 390 (3.6%) from other races, and 471 (4.3%) from two or more races. Hispanic or Latino of any race were 1,628 persons (14.9%).

The Census reported that 10,916 people (100% of the population) lived in households, 1 (0%) lived in non-institutionalized group quarters, and 0 (0%) were institutionalized.

There were 4,837 households, out of which 1,205 (24.9%) had children under the age of 18 living in them, 2,291 (47.4%) were opposite-sex married couples living together, 442 (9.1%) had a female householder with no husband present, 139 (2.9%) had a male householder with no wife present. There were 217 (4.5%) unmarried opposite-sex partnerships, and 54 (1.1%) same-sex married couples or partnerships. 1,596 households (33.0%) were made up of individuals, and 588 (12.2%) had someone living alone who was 65 years of age or older. The average household size was 2.26. There were 2,872 families (59.4% of all households); the average family size was 2.89.

The population was spread out, with 2,095 people (19.2%) under the age of 18, 539 people (4.9%) aged 18 to 24, 2,524 people (23.1%) aged 25 to 44, 3,864 people (35.4%) aged 45 to 64, and 1,895 people (17.4%) who were 65 years of age or older. The median age was 46.6 years. For every 100 females, there were 89.8 males. For every 100 females age 18 and over, there were 86.3 males.

There were 5,113 housing units at an average density of 1,729.1 units per square mile (667.6 units/km^{2}), of which 2,988 (61.8%) were owner-occupied, and 1,849 (38.2%) were occupied by renters. The homeowner vacancy rate was 1.0%; the rental vacancy rate was 5.0%. 7,390 people (67.7% of the population) lived in owner-occupied housing units and 3,526 people (32.3%) lived in rental housing units.

=== 2009–2013 ACS estimates ===
During 2009–2013, Sierra Madre had a median household income of $88,837, with 8.3% of the population living below the federal poverty line.

== Arts and culture ==
Downtown Sierra Madre has small restaurants and shops. Sierra Madre hosts an Independence Day parade and three days of festivities each year. The date of the parade varies from year to year, dependent on when the Monday of the holiday weekend falls. Residents like to call it a "Star Spangled Weekend." The old tradition of water-filled squirt guns during the parade has been scrapped for "confetti eggs" to throw at parade participants and viewers. Concerts, food and game booths and the ubiquitous beer booth are all a part of the firework-free weekend.

In the northern and northeastern portions of the city are the Lower and Upper Sierra Madre Canyons. These small communities are noted for their narrow and winding roads, lush vegetation, views of the San Gabriel Valley, and small bungalows or cabins. Bailey Canyon Wilderness Park has these resources and hiking trail entrances are available to the public: Sierra Madre Wilderness Trail, Live Oak Nature Trail, and Canyon View Nature Trail. The park itself has a Native Botanical Area and picnic area barbecues and fire rings

=== Wisteria vine ===
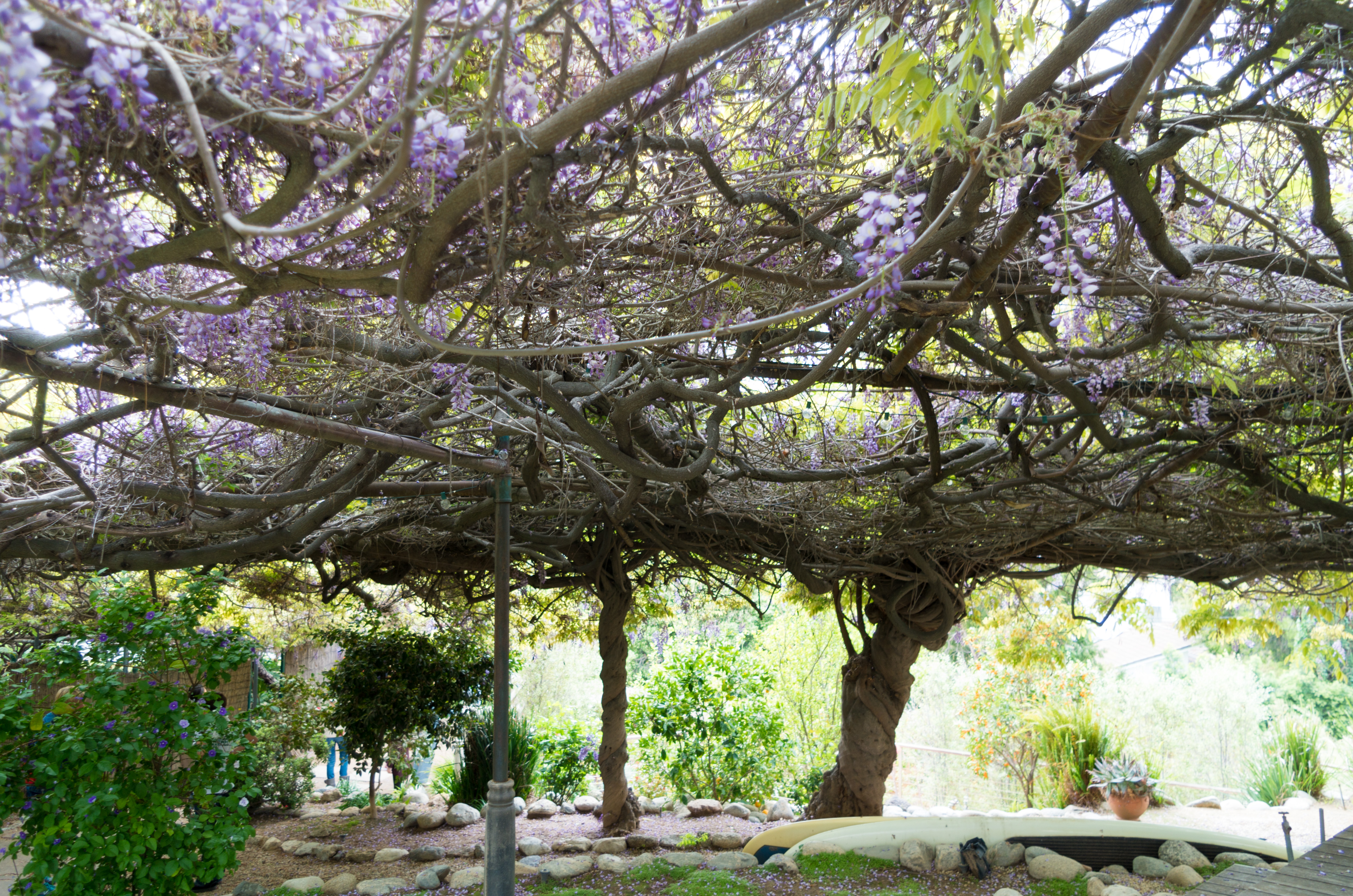
The Sierra Madre Wisteria

Sierra Madre is known for its annual Wistaria Festival (an alternative spelling of Wisteria), which celebrates its 1 acre (4,000 m^{2}) Chinese wisteria (Wisteria sinensis) vine, which was planted in the 1890s. The plant was named by the Guinness Book of World Records as the largest flowering plant and one of the seven horticultural wonders of the world. The annual festival is the one day a year the vine on private property can be viewed. The city's more than 500-foot (150 m)-long Wisteria Vine, was purchased in 1894 by Mrs. William (Alice) Brugman from the old Wilson nursery, in Monrovia, for seventy-five cents. Over time, the vine, with its lavender flowers, grew so large that it crushed the house. Now the vine spans two back yards in the 500 block of North Hermosa Avenue. The vine measures more than 1 acre (4,000 m^{2}) in size and weighs 250 tons.

=== Rose Parade involvement ===
On January 1, 1917, Sierra Madre made its first entry in the Pasadena Tournament of Roses parade. Since 1954, the year it was founded, the Sierra Madre Rose Float Association (SMRFA) has organized the volunteers who decorate the self made Tournament of Roses floats every year, and receives no funds from the city. The association holds a design competition every year, and volunteers start welding on the float chassis in March, preparing for screening, painting, and decorating, and culminating in "deco week," a busy 6 day period that ends with judging on December 31. While many volunteers reside locally, many come from across the country and international locations to contribute to the effort.

In 2010, the Sierra Madre Rose Float Association and float designer Charles Meier won their fourth award in a row, the "Lathrop K. Leishman Award" for Most Beautiful Non-Commercial Float. Since 2006 the Sierra Madre entry has received awards for its design and decoration in competitions alongside corporate commercial floats with budgets that dwarf that of SMRFA's. Recent designs and awards include:

2022: Nature's Classroom "Judges Award," most outstanding float design and dramatic impact

2020: Ka Lā Hiki Ola "President Award," most outstanding use and presentation of flowers

2019: Harmony's Garden "Director Trophy," most beautiful artistic design and use of floral and non-floral materials

2018: Chivalry! "Fantasy Trophy," most outstanding display of fantasy and imagination

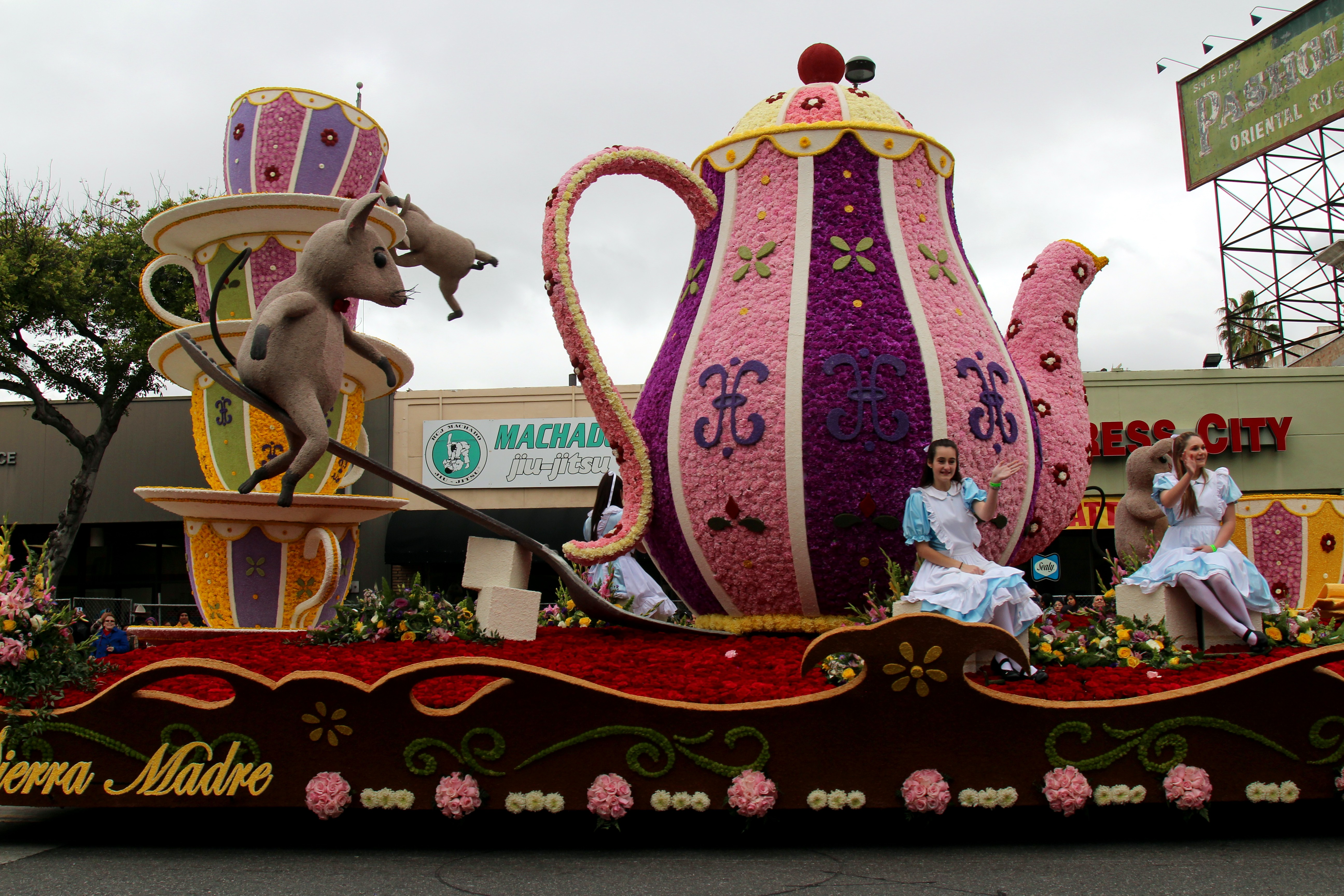
The Cat's Away, Sierra Madre Rose Float Association's float from the 2017 Rose Parade. The teapot is decorated with pink and purple carnations and yellow strawflower embellishments, and the chassis is covered in red roses.

2017: The Cat's Away "Mayor’s Trophy," most outstanding city entry – national or international

2016: Rollin' on the River "Animation Trophy"

2015: I Think I Can "Mayor’s Trophy," most outstanding city entry – national or international

2014: Catching the Big One "Mayor’s Trophy," most outstanding city entry – national or international

2013: The Sky's the Limit "Isabella Coleman Trophy," best presentation of color and color harmony

2012: Colorful Imagination

2011: Sueños de California "Governor's Trophy," best depiction of life in California

2010: California Girls "Governor's Trophy," best depiction of life in California

2009: Bollywood Dreams "Lathrop K. Leishman Award," most beautiful entry from a non-commercial sponsor

2008: Valentine's Day "Princess’ Trophy," most beautiful entry under thirty-five feet in length

2007: Our Wonderful Wistaria "Lathrop K. Lieshman Award," most beautiful entry from a non-commercial sponsor

2006: Wonder of Reading "Founder's trophy", most outstanding float built by volunteers from a community or organization

=== Mater Dolorosa Monastery ===
In the foothills of Sierra Madre is an 80 acres (32 ha) retreat with a fountain and gardens. Mater Dolorosa Monastery's first permanent structure was built in 1931. In 1949, the new retreat house was built and dedicated. The Mater Dolorosa Retreat Center (Mater Dolorosa means "Mother of Sorrows") has provided an environment of peace for monks as well as Methodists, and Presbyterians.

Shortly before the Rose Bowl game in 1958, Ohio State Coach Woody Hayes started looking for a place to sequester his team. The Mater Dolorosa monastery in Sierra Madre offered secluded serenity, along with a small company of black-robed friars to make sure the team didn't get into any mischief. The Buckeyes won the game. Other team coaches have followed suit. Bobby Bell, a Minnesota linebacker, remembered the team bus pulling into the monastery one late night, with only the headlights and police escort lights shining against the religious statues. He remarked to his coach: "You don't have to worry about bed-check tonight, Coach."

== Government ==
=== City Council ===
The Sierra Madre City Council has five members elected to four-year terms. The council is responsible for general city policy, as well as for the appointment of the City Manager, City Attorney, and members of the city's boards and commissions. It also serves as the governing body for the Community Redevelopment Agency and Public Financing Authority. The positions of Mayor and Mayor Pro Tempore rotate among the five members.

The current City Council members are:

- Mayor: Robert Parkhurst
- Mayor Pro Tem: Kristine Lowe
- City Council Members: Edward Garcia, Kelly Kriebs, and Gene Goss

=== List of mayors ===
This is a list of Sierra Madre mayors by year.

- 1907–1914 Charles Worthington Jones – First mayor of Sierra Madre
- 1953–1954 Henry F. Korsmeier
- 1954 Charles E. Louk
- 1994–1995 MaryAnn MacGillivray
- 2007–2008 Enid Joffe
- 2008–2009 Kurt Zimmerman
- 2009–2010 MaryAnn MacGillivray
- 2010–2011 Joe Mosca
- 2011–2012 John Buchanan
- 2012–2013 Josh Moran
- 2013–2014 Nancy Walsh
- 2014–2015 John Harabedian
- 2015–2016 John Capoccia
- 2016–2017 Gene Goss
- 2017–2018 Rachelle Pastor Arizmendi
- 2018–2019 Denise Delmar

=== County ===
The Los Angeles County Department of Health Services operates the Monrovia Health Center in Monrovia, serving Sierra Madre.

=== State and federal representation ===
In the California State Legislature, Sierra Madre is in the 25th senatorial district, represented by Democrat Sasha Renée Pérez, and the 41st Assembly district, represented by Democrat John Harabedian.

In the United States House of Representatives, Sierra Madre is in California's 28th congressional district, represented by Democrat Judy Chu.

== Education ==
Full and transitional preschool options include Sierra Madre Community Nursery School (SMCNS), Sunnyside School House Preschool, Bethany Christian School, Alverno Height's Academy and St. Rita Catholic School.

Public schools within the city are Sierra Madre Elementary School and Sierra Madre Middle School, which sit half a mile apart on Highland Avenue and are included in the Pasadena Unified School District public school system. Private school options include Alverno Heights Academy, Bethany Christian School, St. Rita School, and The Gooden School.

== Media ==
Sierra Madre is served by two local newspapers, the legally adjudicated Mountain Views News, Sierra Madre Weekly and online news source Sierra Madre News.Net.

The independent, non-corporate community newspaper Colorado Boulevard Newspaper covers Sierra Madre both in print and online, along with neighboring cities in the western San Gabriel Valley.

== Infrastructure ==
=== City services ===
The Sierra Madre Police Department patrols the city, providing 24/7 protection for the citizens of Sierra Madre.

Sierra Madre is the last city in Los Angeles County to provide paramedic service to its residents.

In early 2016, the City temporarily turned to LA County (after nearly reaching an agreement with neighboring Arcadia) to assist SMPD due to staffing issues. Sierra Madre entered into a contract with L.A. County Sheriff’s Department, providing law enforcement services from 6 p.m. to 6 a.m. Sierra Madre Police Department resumed full patrol responsibilities in October.

=== Fire ===
The Sierra Madre Fire Department provides fire protection services for the city. Until 2017, Sierra Madre had a volunteer fire department.

=== Transportation ===
The city has no traffic lights except at city limits with Pasadena and Arcadia.

In July 2003, the Los Angeles County Metropolitan Transportation Authority opened the Gold Line (later known as the L Line, now part of the A Line) from Union Station to Sierra Madre Villa station(which is actually located in neighboring Pasadena). Sierra Madre expanded local transit service as part of the new operation.

The City of Sierra Madre operates its own bus service, which is called Gateway Coach. Los Angeles Metro Bus Line 268 connects the city to both Sierra Madre Villa station and El Monte station. Pasadena Transit route 60 offers an additional connection to Sierra Madre Villa station. The city is also served by Metro Micro, LA Metro's microtransit service.

=== Animal services ===
As of 2026 the Pasadena Humane Society contracts with the City of Sierra Madre for animal services.

== Historic landmarks ==
Forty-eight properties are listed on Sierra Madre's Designated Historical Properties List, including Sierra Madre Pioneer Cemetery (1884), Old North Church (1890) of Sierra Madre Congregational Church (1928), the Episcopal Church of the Ascension (1888), and Hart's house (1884) in Sierra Madre Memorial Park.

== In popular culture ==
- In 1910, New York filmmaker D. W. Griffith began producing movies in town, using townspeople as extras.
- 1954 Eddie Foy Jr. and The Seven Little Foys starring Bob Hope and Milly Vitale filmed at the Pinney House
- 1956 Strange Intruder
- The 1956 classic original version of The Invasion of the Body Snatchers was filmed in town, with Kersting Court featured in a key scene; it starred Kevin McCarthy, Dana Wynter, and Larry Gates. In 1993, Invasion of the Body Snatchers was selected for preservation in the United States National Film Registry by the Library of Congress as being "culturally, historically, or aesthetically significant".
- In 1976, Alfred Hitchcock filmed segments of Family Plot in Sierra Madre's Pioneer Cemetery.
- John Carpenter filmed a scene for Halloween at the Pioneer Cemetery in 1978.
- 1980 horror film The Fog by John Carpenter filmed at the Church of the Ascension.
- 1981 Halloween II filmed at the center of town; in the movie, the shape crosses Sierra Madre Boulevard and heads up Baldwin Avenue.
- 1982 Halloween III filmed at The Buccaneer and in Kersting Court
- In 1983, Academy Award-nominated film Testament was shot entirely on location in Sierra Madre.
- In 1985, Better Off Dead was filmed on both Baldwin Avenue and Mountain Trail.
- 1988 Return of the Living Dead Part II
- 1990 David Lynch filmed Twin Peaks in the Pioneer Cemetery. (553 East Sierra Madre Boulevard)
- 1994 Ed Wood by Tim Burton starring Johnny Depp (Alverno High School, 200 North Michillinda Avenue)
- 1995 The Last Supper (Filmed exterior & cafe at Kersting Ct.)
- 1998 The Wedding Singer starring Adam Sandler and Drew Barrymore. (43 Sierra Place)
- 2000 Dude, Where's My Car?
- 2001 The Princess Diaries (Interior high school scenes filmed at Alverno Heights Academy, 200 North Michillinda Avenue)
- 2001 Legally Blonde (Delta Nu sorority house filmed at Alverno Heights Academy)
- 2005 Kicking and Screaming at Bean Town Coffee Bar in downtown Sierra Madre; starring Will Ferrell, Robert Duvall, Kate Walsh, and Josh Hutcherson.
- 2010 Glee Season 2, Episode 3 "Grilled Cheesus", Episcopal Church of the Ascension (25 East Laurel Avenue) as Mercedes' church
- 2014 Not That Funny starring Tony Hale
- 2017 Unforgettable starring Katherine Heigl and Rosario Dawson, filmed in downtown Sierra Madre and at Sierra Madre Elementary School (141 West Highland Avenue).
- 2017 Lady Bird (Alverno Heights Academy, 200 North Michillinda Avenue)
- Bird Box (2018) was filmed in front of City Hall and Memorial Park.
- Various films have been filmed at Mater Dolorosa Monastery.

== Notable people ==
- Dane Boedigheimer, known by stage name Dane Boe – creator of popular web series Annoying Orange, lives in Sierra Madre
- Gutzon Borglum – Sculptor of Mount Rushmore and other artworks.
- Otis Chandler – publisher of the Los Angeles Times between 1960 and 1980, grew up on his family's ranch in Sierra Madre
- Annemarie Davidson (1920–2012) – artist with emphasis in copper enamel, resident of Sierra Madre.
- Kevin Dunn – actor, Transformers, True Detective, Hot Shots!, lives in Sierra Madre
- Jill Emery – original bassist for rock band Hole, lives in Sierra Madre
- Louise Gunning – popular Broadway singer, wife of violinist Oskar Seiling, lived and died in Sierra Madre
- Herbert Hoover Jr. – diplomat, lived in Sierra Madre
- Young Noble (1978-2025) – the stage name of Rufus Lee Cooper III, an American rapper and member of Tupac Shakur's rap group Outlawz, born in Sierra Madre
- Shag – professional moniker of artist Josh Agle, born in Sierra Madre
- Max West – All-Star outfielder/first baseman, died in Sierra Madre
- Alan Wood – Supplied the American flag raised in the historic Raising the Flag on Iwo Jima photograph.
- Matt Young – All-Star starting pitcher, together with Boston Red Sox teammate Roger Clemens owns the Major League Baseball record for the fewest hits (2) allowed in a doubleheader, grew up in Sierra Madre and played in Sierra Madre Little League

== See also ==
- California's 25th State Senate district
- California's 27th congressional district
- Rancho Santa Anita
- Sierra Madre Police Department
