= Annemarie Davidson =

German-born American artist

- Annemarie Davidson
- Born: Annemarie Behrendt; 1920; Berlin, Germany
- Died: September 24, 2012; Sierra Madre, California, U.S.
- Education: New York University, Columbia University
- Occupation: Artist
- Known for: Copper enamels
- Spouse: Norman Davidson

Annemarie Davidson (née Behrendt) (1920-September 24, 2012) was a German-born American copper enamel artist. Davidson was known for her Southern Californian modernist freeform abstract copper enamels and was influenced by noted enamelists Curtis Tann, Doris Hall, and Mary Sharp. Davidson "is responsible for some of the finest enamels in the second half of the 20th Century."

== History ==
Annemarie Davidson was born Annemarie Behrendt in 1920 in Berlin, Germany. Davidson came to New York City with her family in 1936. Davidson, studied economics, receiving her bachelor's degree from New York University in 1941, and was awarded her master's degree at Columbia University in 1942. In 1942, Davidson married Norman Davidson, a chemist and molecular biologist. The Davidsons moved to Sierra Madre, California, in 1946 where Norman Davidson was Caltech professor and a pioneering scientist in the field of microbiology.

While Davidson's husband was at Harvard in 1957, she studied with enamelist Doris Hall in Cambridge. Returning to Sierra Madre in 1958, Davidson continued studying with the African American enamelist Curtis Tann. Davidson became a friend of Los Angeles–based enamelist Mary Sharp. Influenced by Hall, Tann and to some extent Sharp, Davidson's enamels were brightly colored and abstract. Davidson would use glass fragments, which she referred to as "jewels" in her work which would become part of the enamel, giving her work a distinctive freeform sculptural style. Davidson produced a variety of copper enameled plates and bowls in various sizes, along with copper enamel tile to be used as inlays for boxes and furniture. Her work was sold by "leading gift and furniture stores throughout the country."

Davidson often collaborated with artist Blaine Rath. Davidson's enamels would be mounted in boxes and other decorative objects made from walnut, maple and rosewood crafted by Rath.

Davidson died September 24, 2012, in Sierra Madre.

== Exhibitions ==
- International Exhibit in New Delhi, India
- Decorative Arts and Ceramics Exhibition at the Wichita Art Association in 1958
- California Design exhibitions at the Pasadena Art Museum 1961, 1962, and 1965
- Long Beach Museum of Art 2007
- Mobile Museum of Art 2008
- Cleveland Museum of Art 2009
