= Norman Davidson (biologist) =

American molecular biologist

Norman Ralph Davidson (April 5, 1916 – February 14, 2002) was an American molecular biologist notable for advancing genome research, member of the National Academy of Sciences, received a National Medal of Science from U.S. President Bill Clinton, was a professor at Caltech. The New York Times called Davidson "major figure in advancing genome research ... whose groundbreaking work in molecular biology led to the earliest understanding of the overall structure of genomes". The Los Angeles Times called him "a groundbreaking Caltech chemical biologist". President Bill Clinton cited the scientist for "breakthroughs in chemistry and biology which have led to the earliest understanding of the overall structure of genomes".

== Career and life ==
Davidson was born in Chicago. He received B.S. degree in chemistry at the University of Chicago in 1937, and received another B.S. degree at the University of Oxford in 1939 as a Rhodes Scholar. In 1941 he received his Ph.D. degree in chemistry from the University of Chicago. Davidson was married to enamel artist Annemarie Davidson.

== Awards and distinctions ==
- In 1996, the National Medal of Science by President Clinton
- A founding member of the advisory council to the Human Genome Project
- The 1980 California Scientist of the Year
- The Robert A. Welch Award in Chemistry (1989)
- The Dickson Prize in Science (1985)
- The Peter Debye Award by the American Chemical Society (1971)
- A member of the National Academy of Sciences for 42 years
- A fellow of the American Academy of Arts and Sciences since 1984
- An honorary doctorate from the University of Chicago
