= E. Waldo Ward & Son =

American food company

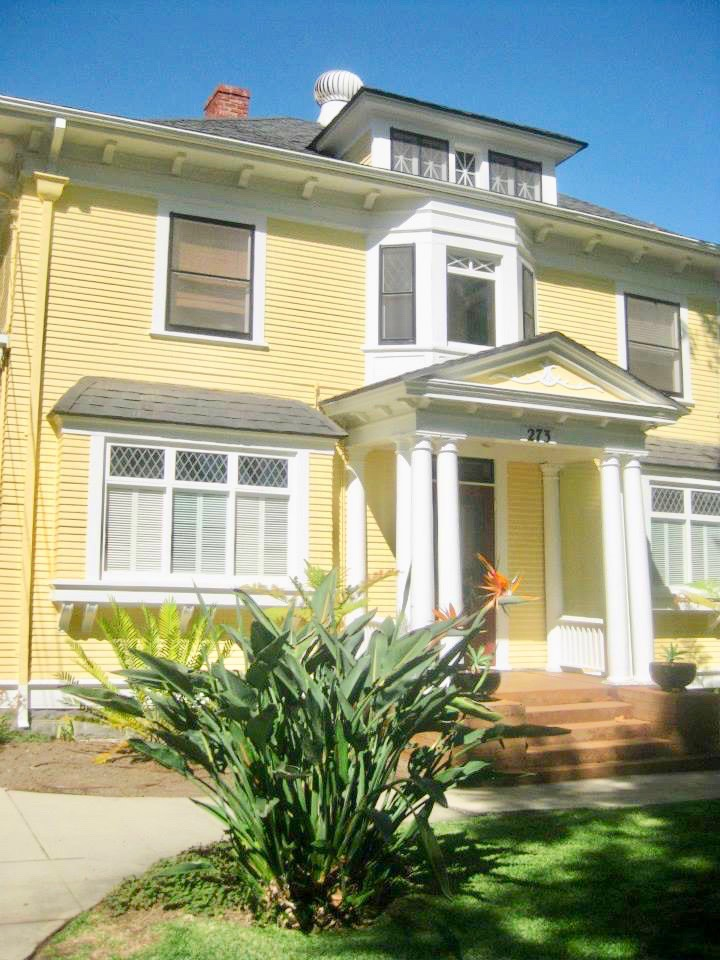
- The 1903 E. Waldo Ward home.
- Industry: Artisanal preserves and specialty foods
- Founded: 1917
- Founder: Edwin Waldo Ward
- Headquarters: 273 E. Highland Ave., Sierra Madre, CA, U.S.
- Owner: Richard and Jeff Ward
- Website: waldoward.com

E. Waldo Ward & Son is an artisanal preserves and specialty foods company and museum located at 273 E. Highland Ave., Sierra Madre, CA. It was founded in 1917.

== History ==
Edwin Waldo Ward, a New York-based food salesman, came to California for health reasons in 1891. In 1903, he purchased 10 acres in Sierra Madre and built a home and barn on the property. He gradually expanded his land to encompass 30 acres, upon which he started a citrus grove. As a salesman, he had promoted English-style marmalade for Union Pacific dining cars and for the Harvey House chain of restaurants and hotels; he decided to piggyback on the idea and set about creating his own spreads, starting with a Seville orange one. He began experimenting with recipes in 1915 and started his enterprise in 1917, with customers such as the railroad dining cars and Harvey House. In the 1920s, Ward began adding jams to his array of products. By the '40s he was importing and hand-stuffing olives from Spain.

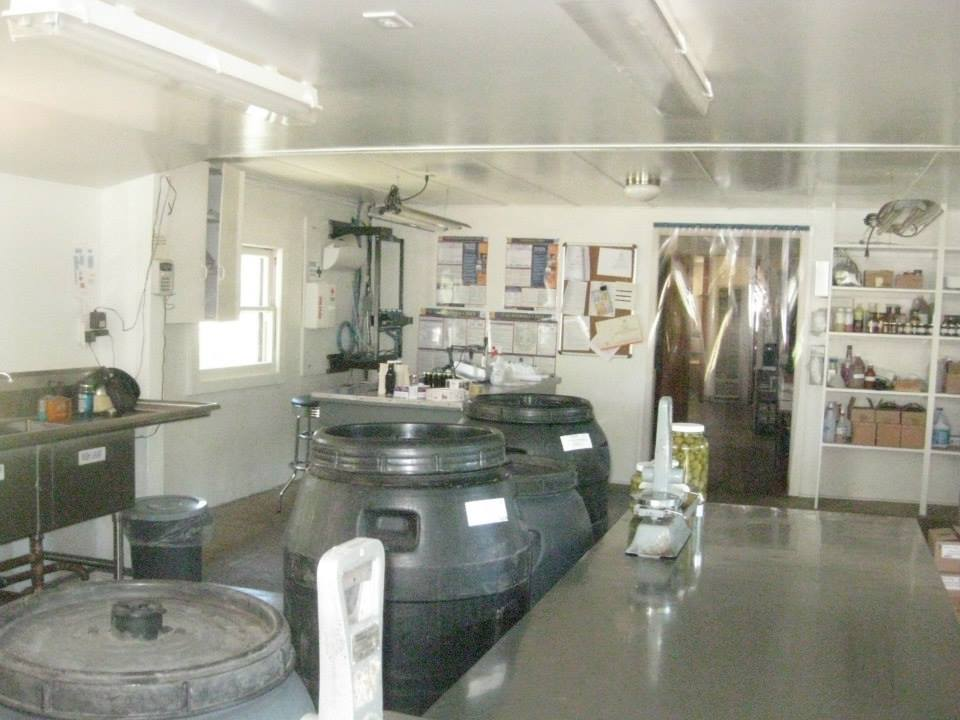
The factory still uses some of the original (now antique) equipment.

In the modern era, the company produces 90 to 100 items such as brandied pears, brandied cherries, seafoood cocktail sauce, chili sauce, corn relish, cranberry relish, mango chutney, apple butter, pumpkin butter, cherry butter, apricot preserve, mango preserve, apricot pineapple jam, gooseberry preserves, raspberry jalapeño jam, orange papaya marmalade, lemon marmalade, lime marmalade, tangelo marmalade, red currant jelly, mint jelly, acai pomegranate jelly, and many other selections. The Ward family grows its own pesticide-free blood oranges, Valencias, Sevilles, tangerines, tangelos and kumquats, but as the original acreage of E. Waldo Ward is between 2.5 and 3 acres, the company uses extra citrus from Riverside and berries from the Pacific Northwest. They are the producers of jams for client Laura Ann's Jam, manufacturing items such as blueberry basil preserve, strawberry vanilla preserve, and raspberry habañero preserve, and Simmie J's Gourmet Barbecue Sauce. E. Waldo Ward's equipment is frequently antique, such as burners that date from 1915, a 1930 stainless steel citrus-peel slicer, and two kettles that date to World War II. Running the company are Richard and Jeff Ward, grandson and great-grandson of Edwin Waldo Ward.

=== Museum ===
E. Waldo Ward is open for personal tours of the factory and barn. Items on display include the company's original machine that capped jars, vintage citrus crate labels, and a restored 1952 Chevrolet truck.

== Gallery ==
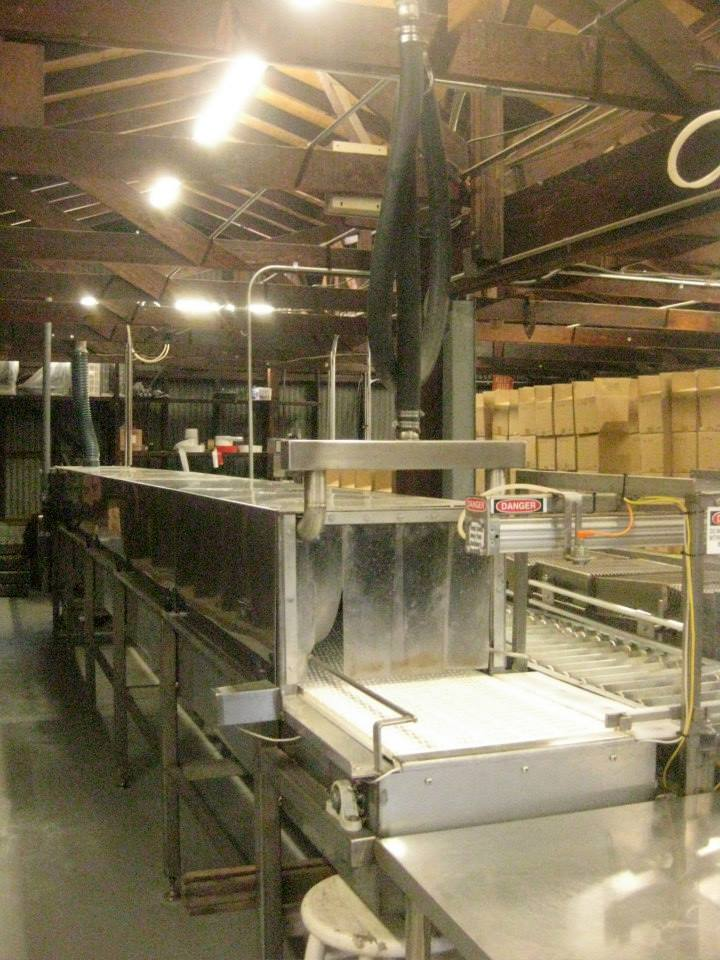

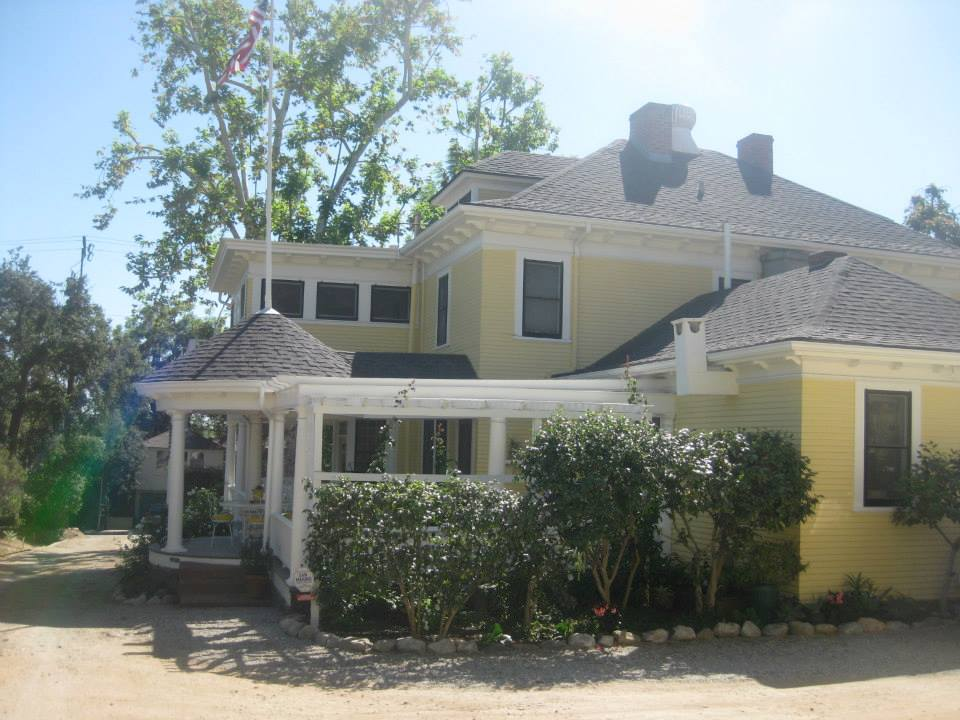

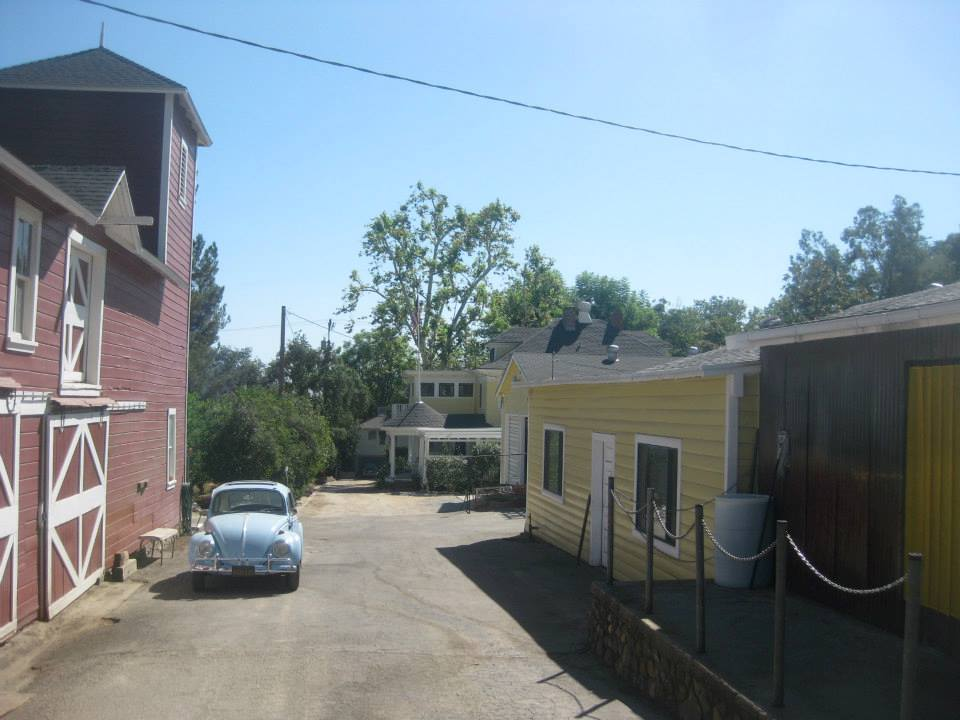

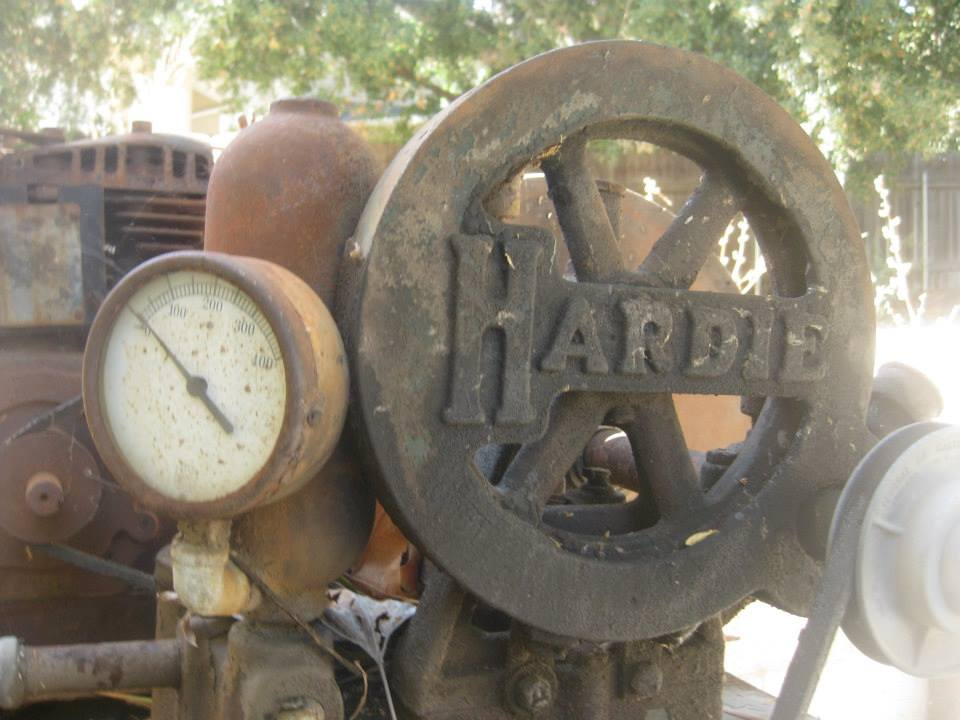

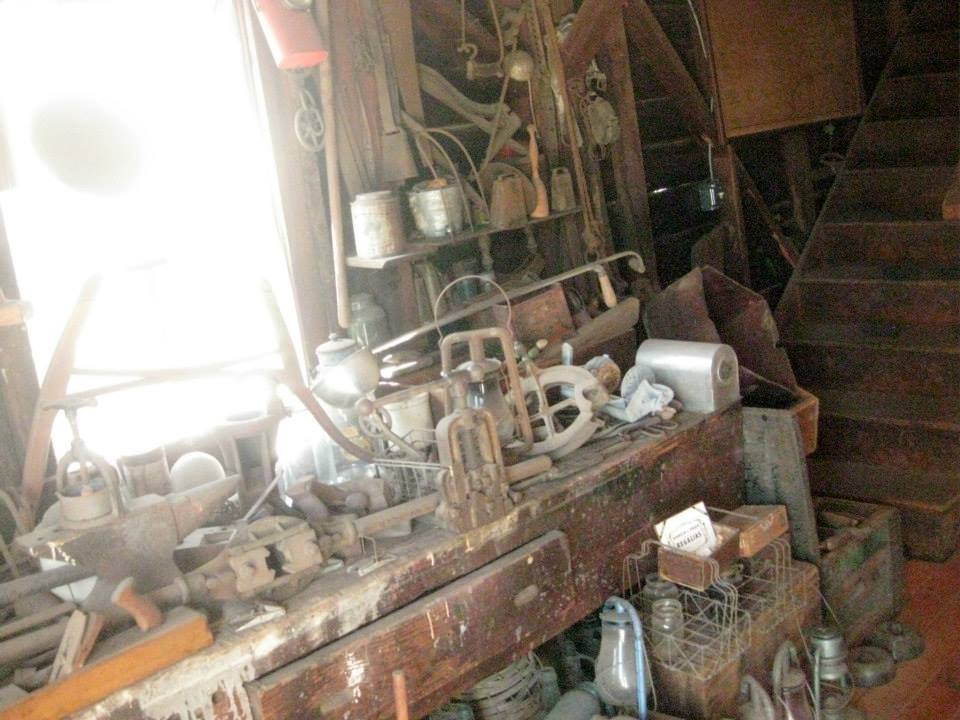

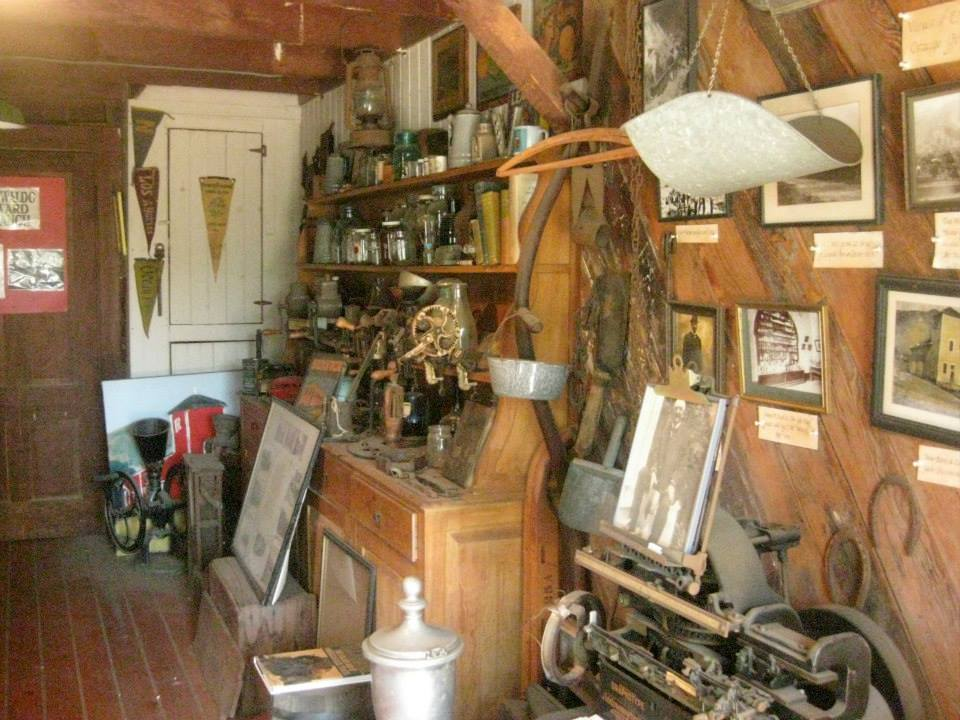

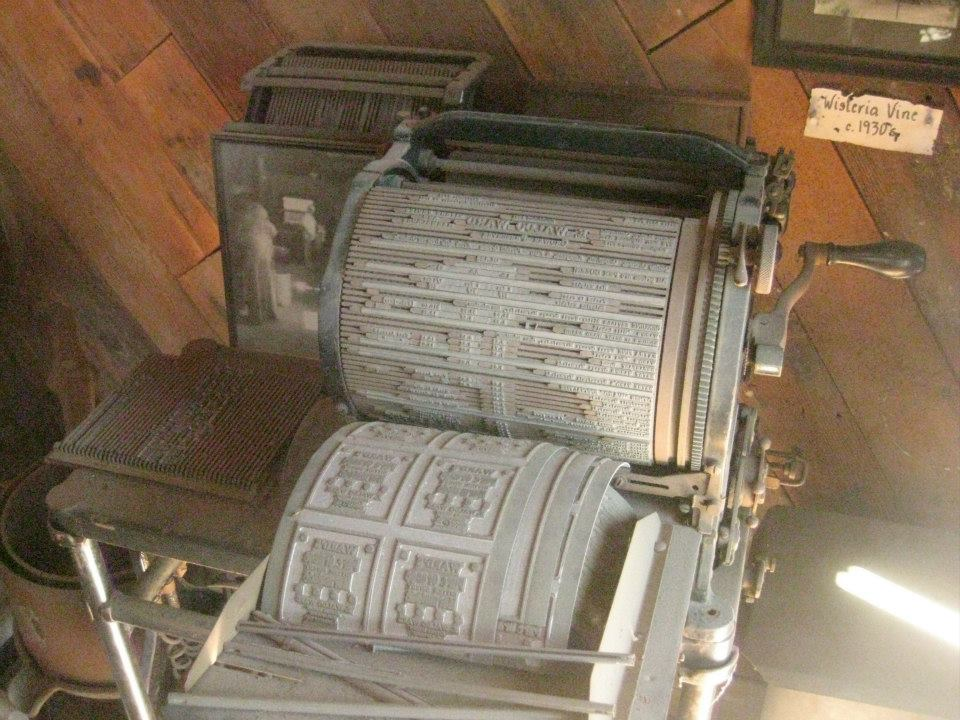

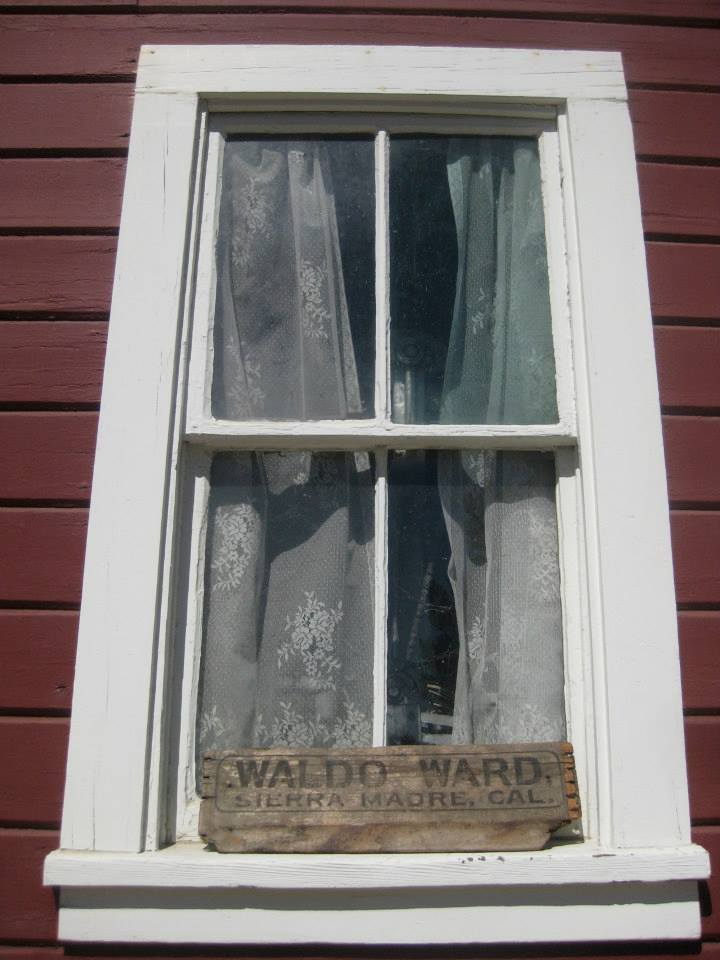

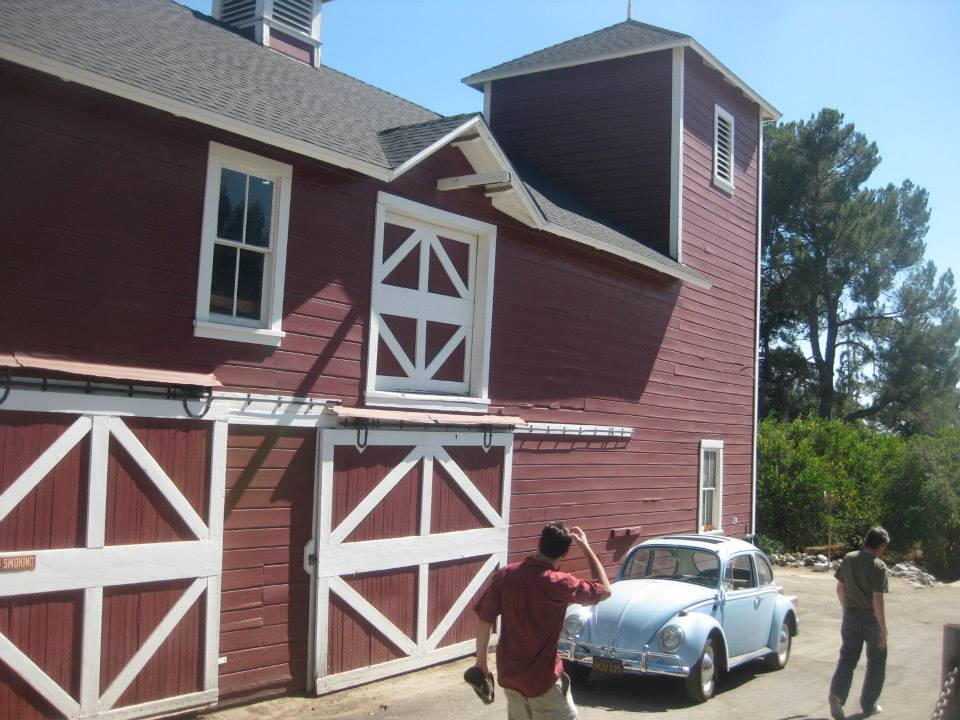
