= List of high schools in Los Angeles County, California =

This is a list of high schools in Los Angeles County, California.

== Catholic ==
=== Los Angeles City ===
- Bishop Alemany High School, Mission Hills
- Bishop Conaty-Our Lady of Loretto High School (girls), Harvard Heights
- Bishop Mora Salesian High School (boys), Boyle Heights
- Cathedral High School (boys), Elysian Park
- Chaminade College Preparatory School, West Hills
- Crespi Carmelite High School (boys), Encino
- Louisville High School (girls), Woodland Hills
- Loyola High School (boys), Harvard Heights
- Immaculate Heart High School (girls), Los Feliz
- Mary Star of the Sea High School, San Pedro
- Marymount High School (girls), Bel-Air
- Notre Dame Academy (girls), Rancho Park
- Notre Dame High School Sherman Oaks
- Sacred Heart High School (girls), Lincoln Heights
- St. Bernard High School, Playa del Rey
- St. Genevieve High School, Panorama City

=== Other cities ===
- Alverno High School (girls), Sierra Madre
- Bishop Amat Memorial High School, La Puente
- Bishop Montgomery High School, Torrance
- Cantwell-Sacred Heart of Mary High School, Montebello
- Damien High School (boys), La Verne, previously Pomona Catholic Boys High School
- Don Bosco Technical Institute (boys), Rosemead
- Flintridge Sacred Heart Academy (girls), La Cañada Flintridge
- Holy Family High School (girls), Glendale
- Junípero Serra High School, Gardena
- La Salle High School, Pasadena
- Mayfield Senior School of the Holy Child Jesus (girls), Pasadena
- Paraclete High School, Lancaster
- Pomona Catholic High School (girls), Pomona, previously Holy Name Academy
- Providence High School, Burbank
- Ramona Convent Secondary School (girls), Alhambra
- St. Anthony High School, Long Beach
- St. Francis High School (boys), La Cañada Flintridge
- St. John Bosco High School (boys), Bellflower
- St. Joseph High School (girls), Lakewood
- St. Lucy's Priory High School (girls), Glendora
- St. Mary's Academy (girls), Inglewood
- St. Monica Academy, Montrose
- St. Monica High School, Santa Monica
- St. Paul High School, Santa Fe Springs
- St. Pius X - St. Matthias Academy (coed), Downey
- San Gabriel Mission High School (girls), San Gabriel

== Other private schools ==
=== Protestant ===
- Bethel Christian High School, Lancaster
- Campbell Hall School, North Hollywood
- Desert Christian High School, Lancaster
- First Lutheran High School, Sylmar
- First Presbyterian School, Arcadia
- Frederick K.C. Price III Christian Schools, Los Angeles
- Glendale Adventist Academy, Glendale
- Hillcrest Christian School, Granada Hills
- Judson International School, Eagle Rock
- Lighthouse Christian Academy, Santa Monica
- Los Angeles Adventist Academy, Los Angeles
- Los Angeles Baptist High School, North Hills
- Los Angeles Lutheran High School, Sylmar
- Lutheran High School, La Verne
- Maranatha High School, Pasadena
- Oaks Christian School, Westlake Village
- Pacific Christian on the Hill, Los Angeles
- Pacific Lutheran High School, Torrance
- Pacifica Christian High School, Santa Monica
- Pilgrim School, Los Angeles
- San Gabriel Adventist Academy, San Gabriel
- Santa Clarita Christian School, Santa Clarita
- South Bay Lutheran High School, Inglewood
- Trinity Lutheran Junior/Senior School, Reseda
- Valley Christian High School, Cerritos
- Village Christian School, Sun Valley

=== Jewish ===
- Bais Chana High School (girls), Los Angeles
- Bais Yaakov of Los Angeles (girls), Los Angeles
- Mesivta of Greater Los Angeles (boys), Calabasas

Cofetz Chaim Los Angeles (Orh chanoch) Pico Robertson

- Mesivta Birkas Yitzchok (boys), Los Angeles
- Milken Community School, Brentwood, Los Angeles

Yeshivas Ohev Shalom (Boys High School) Fairfax

- Netan Eli High School (boys), Los Angeles
- New Community Jewish High School (mixed), West Hills
- Machon Los Angeles Bass Yakkov
- Shalhevet High School (mixed), Los Angeles
- Valley Torah High School (boys), Valley Village
- Valley Torah Lintz High School (girls), Sun Valley
- Yeshiva Gedolah School of Los Angeles / Michael Diller High School (boys), Los Angeles
- Yeshiva High Tech, Los Angeles
- Yeshiva Ohr Elchonon Chabad High School (boys), Los Angeles
- Yeshiva University High School of Los Angeles (boys), Los Angeles
- Yeshiva University High School of Los Angeles (girls), Los Angeles

=== Non-denominational ===
- Advanced Education Academy, La Canada
- AGBU Vatche and Tamar Manoukian High School, Pasadena
- AGBU Manoogian-Demirdjian School, Canoga Park
- American University Preparatory School, downtown Los Angeles
- Archer School for Girls, Brentwood
- Armenian Mesrobian School, Pico Rivera
- Brentwood School, Brentwood
- Bridges Academy, Studio City
- Buckley School, Sherman Oaks
- Chadwick School, Palos Verdes Peninsula
- Crest View Academy, Santa Clarita
- Crossroads School, Santa Monica
- Delphi Academy of Los Angeles, Lake View Terrace
- Excelsior School, Pasadena
- Ferrahian Armenian School, Encino
- Flintridge Preparatory School, La Canada Flintridge
- Harvard-Westlake School, Holmby Hills, Studio City
- Lycée Français de Los Angeles, Rancho Park – Palms
- Marlborough School, Hancock Park
- New Roads School, Santa Monica
- Oakwood School, North Hollywood
- Oxford School, Rowland Heights
- Polytechnic School, Pasadena
- Renaissance Academy, Altadena
- Ribet Academy, Glassell Park
- Rio Hondo Preparatory School, Arcadia
- Rose and Alex Pilibos Armenian School, Hollywood
- Sequoyah School, Pasadena
- Sierra Canyon School, Chatsworth
- STAR Prep Academy, Culver City
- STEM3 Academy, Valley Glen
- TCA Arshag Dickranian Armenian School, Hollywood
- Viewpoint School, Calabasas
- Village Glen High School, Sherman Oaks
- Vistamar School, El Segundo
- The Waverly School, Pasadena
- The Webb Schools, Claremont
- Westridge School for Girls, Pasadena
- Wild Wood High School, Los Angeles
- Wildwood School, Los Angeles
- Windward School, Mar Vista

== Public schools ==
=== ABC Unified School District ===
- Artesia High School, Lakewood
- Cerritos High School, Cerritos
- Richard Gahr High School, Cerritos
- Gretchen Whitney High School, Cerritos
- Tracy High School, Cerritos

=== Acton-Agua Dulce Unified School District ===
- Assurance Learning Academy (charter), Acton
- Vasquez High School, Acton

=== Alhambra Unified School District ===
- Alhambra High School, Alhambra
- Mark Keppel High School, Monterey Park
- San Gabriel High School, San Gabriel

=== Alliance for College-Ready Public Schools ===
- College-Ready Academy High School#4, Los Angeles
- College-Ready Academy High School#6, Los Angeles
- College-Ready Math-Science School, Los Angeles
- Gertz-Ressler Academy High School, Los Angeles
- Heritage College-Ready Academy High School, Los Angeles
- Huntington Park College-Ready High School, Los Angeles
- Richard Merkin Middle Academy, Los Angeles

=== Antelope Valley Union High School District ===
- Antelope Valley High School, Lancaster
- Assurance Learning Academy (charter), Lancaster
- AV Academy High School (charter), Lake Los Angeles
- AV Academy High School (charter), Palmdale
- AV Learning Academy (charter), Lancaster
- Desert Sands Charter High School, Palmdale
- Desert Winds Continuation High School, Lancaster
- Eastside High School, Lancaster
- Highland High School, Palmdale
- Lancaster High School, Lancaster
- Littlerock High School, Littlerock
- Palmdale High School, Palmdale
- Pete Knight High School, Palmdale
- Quartz Hill High School, Quartz Hill
- R. Rex Parris Continuation High School, Palmdale

=== Arcadia Unified School District ===
- Arcadia High School, Arcadia

=== Azusa Unified School District ===
- Agvania High School
- Azusa High School, Azusa
- Gladstone High School, Covina

=== Baldwin Park Unified School District ===
- Baldwin Park High School
- North Park Continuation School
- Sierra Vista High School, Baldwin Park

=== Bassett Unified School District ===
- Bassett High School, La Puente

=== Bellflower Unified School District ===
- Bellflower High School, Bellflower
- Mayfair High School, Lakewood
- Somerset High School, Bellflower

=== Beverly Hills Unified School District ===
- Beverly Hills High School, Beverly Hills

=== Bonita Unified School District ===
- Bonita High School, La Verne
- San Dimas High School, San Dimas

=== Burbank Unified School District ===
- Burbank High School, Burbank
- John Burroughs High School, Burbank
- Monterey High School, Burbank

=== Centinela Valley Union High School District ===
- Hawthorne High School, Hawthorne
- Lawndale High School, Lawndale
- Leuzinger High School, Lawndale

=== Charter Oak Unified School District ===
- Charter Oak High School, Covina

=== Claremont Unified School District ===
- Claremont High School, Claremont

=== Compton Unified School District ===
- Centennial High School, Compton
- Compton High School, Compton
- Dominguez High School, Compton
- Compton Early College, Compton

=== Covina-Valley Unified School District ===
- Covina High School, Covina
- Northview High School, Covina
- South Hills High School, West Covina

=== Culver City Unified School District ===
- Culver City High School

=== Downey Unified School District ===
- Columbus High School
- Downey High School, Downey
- Warren High School, Downey

=== Duarte Unified School District ===
- Duarte High School, Duarte
- California School of the Arts - San Gabriel Valley

=== El Monte Union High School District ===
- Arroyo High School, El Monte
- El Monte High School, El Monte
- Mountain View High School, El Monte
- Rosemead High School, Rosemead
- South El Monte High School, South El Monte

=== El Rancho Unified School District ===
- El Rancho High School, Pico Rivera

=== El Segundo Unified School District ===
- El Segundo High School, El Segundo

=== Glendale Unified School District ===
- Anderson W. Clark Magnet High School
- Crescenta Valley High School, La Crescenta
- Daily High School
- Glendale High School, Glendale
- Herbert Hoover High School, Glendale

=== Glendora Unified School District ===
- Glendora High School, Glendora

=== Hacienda La Puente Unified School District ===
- Glen A. Wilson High School, Hacienda Heights
- La Puente High School, La Puente
- Los Altos High School, Hacienda Heights
- Puente Hills High School, La Puente
- Valley Alternative High School, La Puente
- William Workman High School, City of Industry

=== Inglewood Unified School District ===
- City Honors High School, Inglewood
- Inglewood High School, Inglewood
- Morningside High School, Inglewood
- Philippine Los Angeles High School, Inglewood

=== La Cañada Unified School District ===
- La Cañada High School, La Cañada Flintridge

=== Las Virgenes Unified School District ===
- Agoura High School, Agoura
- Calabasas High School, Calabasas

=== Long Beach Unified School District ===
- Cabrillo High School, Long Beach
- California Academy of Math and Science (CAMS)
  [on the CSU Dominguez Hills campus]
- Ernest S. McBride Sr. High School, Long Beach
- Jordan High School, Long Beach
- Lakewood High School
- Long Beach Polytechnic High School, Long Beach
- Millikan High School, Long Beach
- Renaissance High School for the Arts
- Wilson Classical High School, Long Beach

=== Los Angeles Unified School District ===
See List of Los Angeles Unified School District schools

=== Lynwood Unified School District ===
- Firebaugh High School, Lynwood
- Lynwood High School, Lynwood

=== Manhattan Beach Unified School District ===
- Mira Costa High School, Manhattan Beach

=== Monrovia Unified School District ===
- Monrovia High School, Monrovia

=== Montebello Unified School District ===
- Applied Technology Center, Montebello
- Bell Gardens High School, Bell Gardens
- Montebello High School, Montebello
- Schurr High School, Montebello

=== Norwalk-La Mirada Unified School District ===
- El Camino High School, Whittier
- John Glenn High School, Norwalk
- La Mirada High School, La Mirada
- Norwalk High School, Norwalk
- Southeast Academy Military and Law Enforcement High School Norwalk

=== Palos Verdes Peninsula Unified School District ===
- Palos Verdes High School, Palos Verdes Estates
- Palos Verdes Peninsula High School, Rolling Hills Estates
- Rancho Del Mar High School, Rolling Hills

=== Paramount Unified School District ===
- Paramount High School, Paramount

=== Pasadena Unified School District ===
- Blair International Baccalaureate School, Pasadena (zoned)
- Marshall Fundamental Secondary School, Pasadena (open-enrollment school)
- Muir High School, Pasadena (zoned)
- Pasadena High School, Pasadena (zoned)

=== Pomona Unified School District ===
- Diamond Ranch High School, Pomona
- Franklin High School, Pomona
- Ganesha High School, Pomona
- Garey High School, Pomona
- Palomares High School, Pomona
- Pomona High School, Pomona
- Village Academy High School at Indian Hill, Pomona

=== Redondo Beach Unified School District ===
- Redondo Union High School, Redondo Beach

=== Rowland Unified School District ===
- John A. Rowland High School, Rowland Heights
- Nogales High School, La Puente
- Santana High School, Rowland Heights

=== San Gabriel Unified School District ===
- Del Mar High School, San Gabriel
- Gabrielino High School, San Gabriel

=== San Marino Unified School District ===
- San Marino High School, San Marino

=== Santa Monica-Malibu Unified School District ===
- Malibu High School, Malibu
- Olympic High School, Santa Monica
- Santa Monica High School, Santa Monica

=== South Pasadena Unified School District ===
- South Pasadena High School, South Pasadena

=== Temple City Unified School District ===
- Temple City High School, Temple City

=== Torrance Unified School District ===
- Kurt T. Shery High School, Torrance
- North High School, Torrance
- South High School, Torrance
- Torrance High School, Torrance
- West High School, Torrance

=== Walnut Valley Unified School District ===
- Diamond Bar High School, Diamond Bar
- Ron Hockwalt Academies, Walnut
- Walnut High School, Walnut

=== West Covina Unified School District ===
- Edgewood High School, West Covina
- West Covina High School, West Covina

=== Whittier Union High School District ===
- California High School, Whittier
- La Serna High School, Whittier
- Pioneer High School, Whittier
- Santa Fe High School, Santa Fe Springs
- Whittier High School, Whittier

=== William S. Hart Union High School District ===
- Academy of the Canyons, Santa Clarita
- Canyon High School, Santa Clarita
- Castaic High School, Castaic
- Golden Valley High School, Santa Clarita
- Saugus High School, Santa Clarita
- Valencia High School, Santa Clarita
- West Ranch High School, Stevenson Ranch
- William S. Hart High School, Santa Clarita

=== Other districts ===
- Assurance Learning Academy (charter), Los Angeles
- Assurance Learning Academy (charter), Wilmington
- Animo Inglewood Charter High School, Inglewood
- Animo Leadership Charter High School, Inglewood
- Animo Locke Technology High School, Los Angeles
- Booth High School, Los Angeles
- Carter-Walters Preparatory School of the Arts, San Dimas
- Crittenton High School, Los Angeles
- Da Vinci Schools, El Segundo
- Desert Sands Charter High School, Garden Grove
- Desert Sands Charter High School, Long Beach
- Desert Sands Charter High School, Norwalk
- Desert Sands Charter High School, Santa Ana
- Desert Sands Charter School, Lancaster
- Dr Olga Mohan High School, Los Angeles
- Environmental Charter High School, Lawndale
- Fred C. Nelles High School, Whittier
- International Polytechnic High School, Pomona
- Jack B. Clarke High School, Norwalk
- Los Angeles Complex Science Academy, Los Angeles
- Los Angeles County High School for the Arts, Los Angeles
- Mission View Public Charter, Gardena
- Mission View Public Charter, Inglewood
- Mission View Public Charter, Los Angeles
- Mission View Public Charter, North Hills
- Mission View Public Charter, Pacoima
- Mission View Public Charter, Panorama City
- Mission View Public Charter, San Fernando
- Mission View Public Charter, Santa Clarita (2 locations)
- Montclair College Preparatory School, Van Nuys
- Pacific Learning Center Charter, Long Beach
- Paramount High School Academy, Lakewood
- Pathway High School, Lynwood
- Promise Academy, Long Beach
- Soledad Enrichment Action Charter School, Los Angeles

== See also ==
- List of high schools in California
- List of high schools in Orange County, California
- List of high schools in San Diego County, California
- List of school districts in California
- List of school districts in California by county
- List of schools in the Roman Catholic Archdiocese of Los Angeles
- List of closed secondary schools in California
