= Montview League =

High school athletic conference in California

The Montview League is a high school athletic league that is part of the CIF Southern Section. Member schools are located in the east San Gabriel Valley region of Los Angeles County

== Members ==
- Azusa High School
- Baldwin Park High School
- Duarte High School
- Garey High School
- Nogales High School
- Sierra Vista High School
