= Larry Creger =

Personal information
- Born: July 25, 1932 Truro, Iowa, U.S.
- Died: June 29, 2021 (aged 88) Ottumwa, Iowa, U.S.

Career information
- High school: Truro (Truro, Iowa)
- College: Simpson (1952–1955)
- Position: Forward
- Coaching career: 1955–1983

Career history

Coaching
- 1955–1960: Franklin Consolidated HS
- 1960–1962: Clarion HS
- 1963–1968: Gladstone HS (CA)
- 1968–1970: Los Angeles Stars (assistant)
- 1970–1974: Utah Stars (assistant)
- 1974–1976: Los Angeles Lakers (assistant)
- 1980–1981: Cleveland Cavaliers (assistant)
- 1982–1983: Las Vegas Silvers

Career highlights
- ABA champion (1971)

Larry Rex Creger (July 25, 1932 – June 29, 2021) was an American basketball coach and executive who was an assistant coach and director of player personnel for the Utah Stars of the American Basketball Association and the Los Angeles Lakers and Cleveland Cavaliers of the National Basketball Association. He helped found the Western Basketball Association and ran the Summer Pro League for over a decade.

== Early life ==
Creger was born July 25, 1932 in Truro, Iowa to Leland S. and Phyllis H. (Fluke) Creger. While at Truro High School, he set Iowa's single game scoring record with 47 points. He graduated from Simpson College and later earned a earned a Master of Arts from Colorado State University.

== Career ==
From 1955 to 1960, Creger was the baseball and boy's basketball coach at Franklin Consolidated School in Latimer, Iowa. Franklin's basketball teams went 75–40 under Creger and won two North Star Conference titles. He then coached at Clarion High School in Clarion, Iowa.

In 1962, Creger moved to California and joined the faculty of Azusa High School. The following year, he became the varsity basketball coach at the newly-opened Gladstone High School.

In 1968, Creger became an assistant coach for the American Basketball Association's Los Angeles Stars. He remained with the club when they moved to Utah in 1970. In addition to serving as an assistant coach, Creger oversaw film analysis, compiled statistical records, scheduled practices, and scouted college players. The Stars won the ABA title in 1971.

In 1974, Creger took a similar position with the Los Angeles Lakers, which were coached by his former boss with the Stars, Bill Sharman. Sharman resigned after the 1975-76 season and Creger was reassigned to the position of director of statistics and film analysis.

In 1978, Creger helped Salt Lake City land businessman Neil Christiansen found the Western Basketball Association. Creger was the league's deputy commissioner during their only season.

During the 1979-80 season, Creger was an evaluator of referees for the NBA. In May 1980, he was named director of scouting for the Detroit Pistons. He resigned two months later to become the director of player personnel for the Cleveland Cavaliers.

Creger was general manager of the Las Vegas Silvers during the 1982–83 season. He took over coaching duties after Tom Nissalke resigned to become head coach of the Cleveland Cavaliers.

Creger later worked as a scout for the Atlanta Hawks, Indiana Pacers, Denver Nuggets, and Detroit Pistons. From 1980 to 1992, he owned and operated the Summer Pro League, which he built into one of the leading off-season basketball leagues for NBA prospects.

== Later life ==
Creger was the vice president for business development and relationship manager for professional basketball for BFF Financial, a financial planning firm founded by his nephew. In 2018, he moved back to Iowa. He died on June 29, 2021 at his home in Ottumwa.
