= Miramonte League =

High school athletic league in California

The Miramonte League is a high school athletic league that is part of the CIF Southern Section. Members are located in the eastern San Gabriel Valley in Los Angeles County.

== Members ==
- Edgewood High School
- Bassett High School
- Ganesha High School
- Garey High School
- La Puente High School
- Pomona High School
