= Slauson =

Slauson may refer to:

== People ==
- Matt Slauson (born 1986), an American football guard for the Chicago Bears
- J. S. Slauson (1829–1905), a land developer in 19th century Southern California

== Metro stations ==
- Slauson station (A Line), an at-grade light rail station in Los Angeles
- Slauson station (J Line), a freeway median bus station in Los Angeles

== Roads ==
- Slauson Avenue, a major east-west thoroughfare for southern Los Angeles County, California
- Slauson Freeway, a portion of California State Route 90

== Schools ==
- Slauson Middle School (disambiguation)
  - An intermediate school in the Azusa Unified School District
  - Slauson Middle School (Ann Arbor, Michigan)
