= Sierra Vista High School =

Sierra Vista High School may refer to:

- Sierra Vista High School (California), located in Baldwin Park, California
- Sierra Vista High School (Nevada), located in Spring Valley, Nevada
