= Gladstone High School =

Gladstone High School may refer to one of several high schools:

- Gladstone High School (California) in Covina, California
- Gladstone High School (Michigan) in Gladstone, Michigan
- Gladstone High School (Oregon) in Gladstone, Oregon
- Gladstone High School (South Australia) in Gladstone, South Australia
