= Azusa, California =

City in California, United States

- City
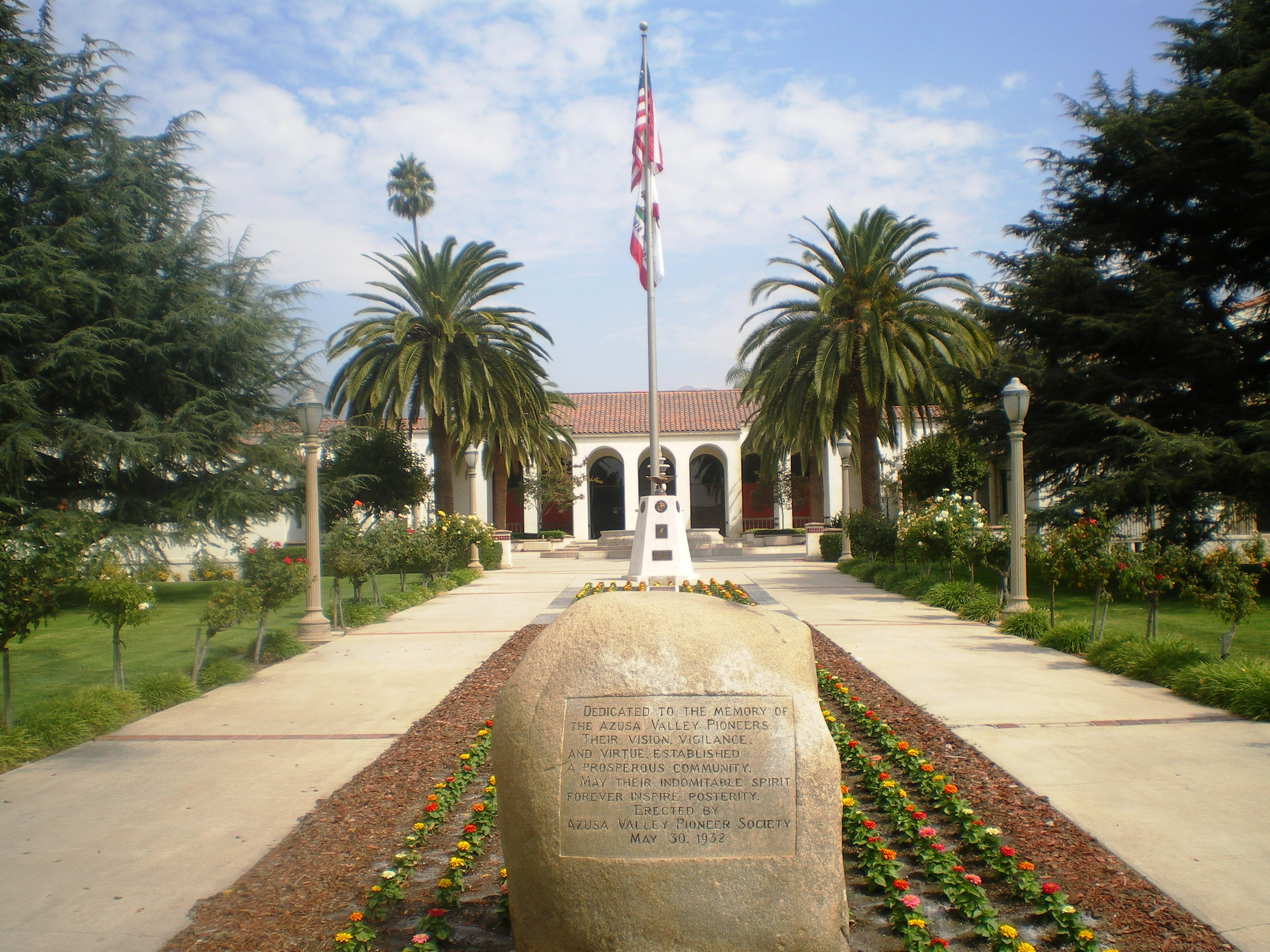
- Azusa City Hall

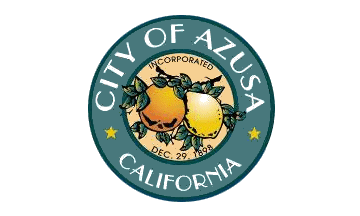
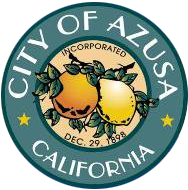
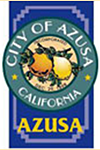
- Flag Seal Logo
- Nickname: "The Canyon City"
- Interactive map of Azusa, California
- Location in California Azusa (California) Azusa (the United States) Azusa (North America)
- Coordinates: 34°7′50″N 117°54′25″W
- Country: United States
- State: California
- County: Los Angeles
- Founded: 1887
- Incorporated: December 29, 1898
- Incorporated: August 14, 1901
- Named for: A hispanicized version of Asuksa-nga, the Tongva settlement that existed at the time of Spanish colonization

Government
  - Type: Council-Manager
  - Mayor: Edward J. Alvarez
  - Mayor Pro Tem: Jesse Avila Jr.
  - Councilmember: Sabrina Bow, Ed.D
  - Councilmember: Andrew N. Mendez
  - Councilmember: Robert Gonzales

Area
  - Total: 9.67 sq mi (25.05 km^{2})
  - Land: 9.66 sq mi (25.02 km^{2})
  - Water: 0.012 sq mi (0.03 km^{2}) 0.13%
- Elevation: 610 ft (186 m)

Population (2020)
  - Total: 50,000
  - Density: 5,175.4/sq mi (1,998.24/km^{2})
- Time zone: UTC−8 (Pacific)
  - Summer (DST): UTC−7 (PDT)
- ZIP Code: 91702
- Area code: 626
- FIPS code: 06-03386
- GNIS feature IDs: 1652667, 2409768
- Website: azusaca.gov

Azusa (Tongva: Azuksa, meaning "skunk") is a city in the San Gabriel Valley region of Los Angeles County, California, United States, at the foot of the San Gabriel Mountains and located 20 miles (32 km) east of downtown Los Angeles.

Its population was 50,000 in 2020, an increase from 46,361 at the 2010 census. Azusa is located along historic Route 66, which passes through the city on Foothill Boulevard and Alosta Avenue.

Azusa is bordered by the San Gabriel Mountains range to the north, Irwindale to the west, the unincorporated community of Vincent to the southwest, Glendora and the unincorporated community of Citrus to the east, and Covina to the south.

== History ==
The name "Azusa" appears to have been derived from the Tongva place name Asuksa-nga, meaning "skunk place," with asuksa meaning skunk and -nga denoting place. The first human settlements in the area date back to approximately 6000 BC. The Takic people moved into the area c. 3500 BC and the Tongva people (Gabrieleño Indians), now commonly regarded as the indigenous people of the region, arrived by at least 55 BC. A backronym, "Azusa stands for everything from A to Z in the U.S.A.", has been a phrase used for many years by organizations such as the Chamber of Commerce to promote the city.

The first Mexican settlement in Azusa was at the Rancho el Susa in 1841, a Mexican land grant from the Alta California Governor Juan Bautista Alvarado to Luis Arenas. In 1844, Arenas sold the rancho's land to Henry Dalton, an English immigrant and wealthy merchant from the Pueblo of Los Angeles, for $7,000. He renamed it Rancho Azusa de Dalton, and had built a winery, distillery, vinegar house, meat smokehouse, and flour mill. Also, a vineyard was planted. Dalton built a house here on a place known as Dalton Hill, near 6th Street and Cerritos Avenue in Azusa.

Dalton was also the owner of the large, adjacent Rancho San Francisquito and Rancho Santa Anita properties. In the end, Dalton owned an unbroken expanse of land from present-day San Dimas to the eastern edge of Pasadena. A portion of Azusa west of the San Gabriel River was within adjacent Rancho Azusa de Duarte.

With the cession of California to the United States following the Mexican–American War, the 1848 Treaty of Guadalupe Hidalgo provided that the land grants would be honored. As required by the Land Act of 1851, a claim for Rancho San Francisquito was filed with the Public Land Commission in 1852 and confirmed by the Commission in 1853, but rejected by the US District Court in 1855, on the grounds that Henry Dalton was not, at the time of the grant, a citizen of Mexico. The decree was reversed by the US Supreme Court, and the grant was patented to Henry Dalton in 1867.

Azusa was listed in the 1860 US census as a township (encompassing the Azusa de Dalton and Azusa de Duarte ranchos) with a population of 363. The 1870 US census listed the area as the township of Azusa – El Monte Township and 1880 US census listed the area as the township of San Jose and Azusa. There were a few corrections to cross out the San Jose name on most of the census pages, but this was done sporadically and there remain many index errors in the online census due to these errors.

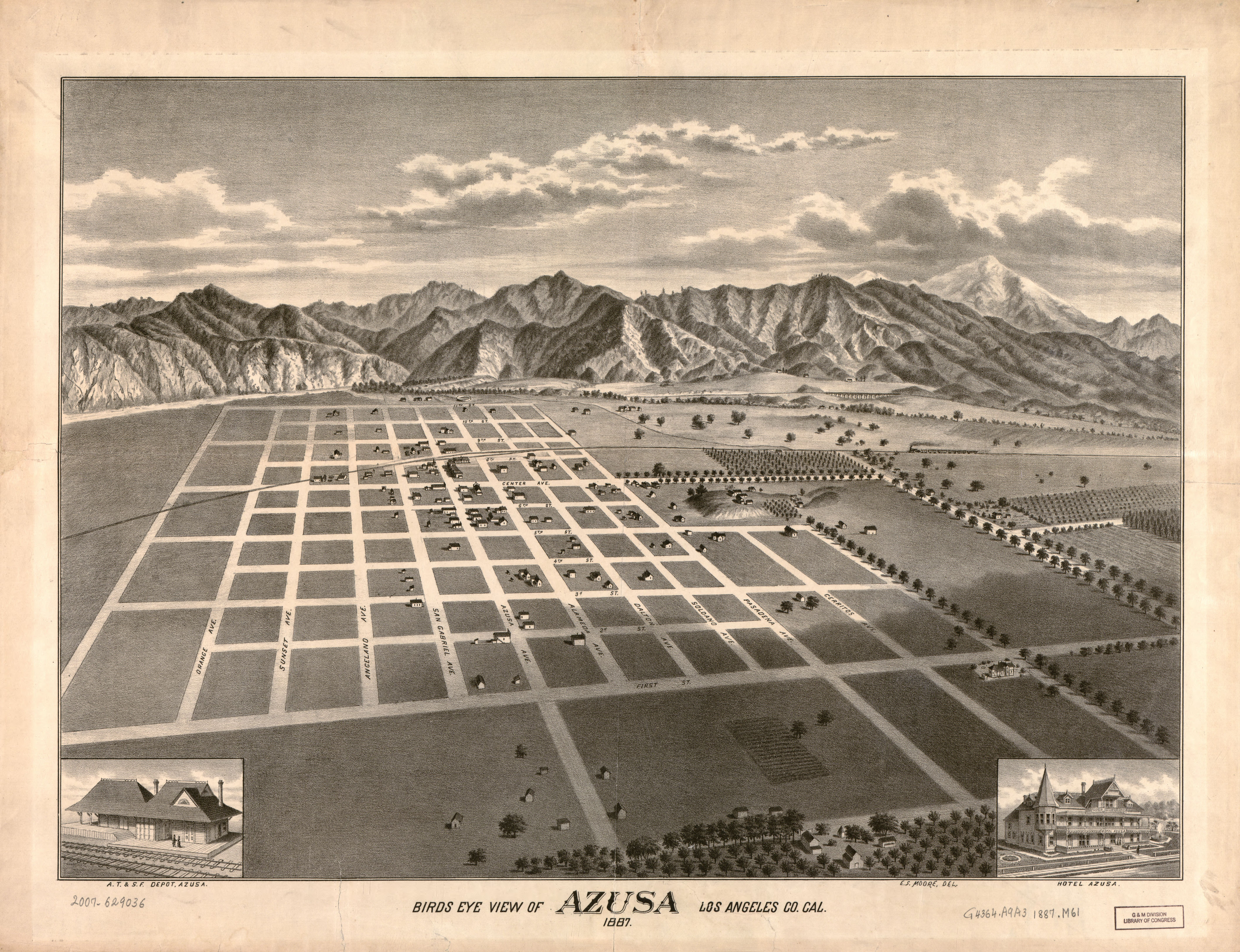
Birds Eye of Azusa, CA, 1887. Bottom insets: "A.T. & S.F. Depot, Azusa" and "Hotel Azusa."

Dalton had borrowed money from Los Angeles banker Jonathan S. Slauson to fund 24 years of litigation, and had to sign the land over to him in 1880. Slauson laid out the plan for the city in 1887 and the city was officially incorporated in 1898.

The completion of the Los Angeles and San Gabriel Valley Railroad in January 1887, later sold to the Santa Fe railroad, brought new people looking for homes and investment opportunities to Azusa. Part of this land boom was the short-lived town of Gladstone in 1887, which merged into Azusa in 1905. The Pacific Electric also provided the community with passenger rail service via its Monrovia-Glendora Line from 1907 to 1951. The A Line Foothill light rail line was built on the old Sante Fe right-of-way.

== Geography ==
The city is located at the entrance to the San Gabriel Canyon, giving the city its nickname "The Canyon City." It is on the east side of the San Gabriel River.

According to the United States Census Bureau, the city has a total area of 9.7 square miles (25 km^{2}); over 99% of it is land.

=== Climate ===
This region experiences warm, dry summers, with no average monthly temperatures above 71.6 °F (22.0 °C). According to the Köppen Climate Classification system, Azusa has a warm-summer Mediterranean climate, abbreviated "Csb" on climate maps.

== Demographics ==
Historical population
Census	Pop.	Note	%±
1860	363		—
1870	320		−11.8%
1900	863		—
1910	1,477		71.1%
1920	2,460		66.6%
1930	4,808		95.4%
1940	5,209		8.3%
1950	11,042		112.0%
1960	20,497		85.6%
1970	25,217		23.0%
1980	29,380		16.5%
1990	41,333		40.7%
2000	44,712		8.2%
2010	46,361		3.7%
2020	50,000		7.8%
U.S. decennial census 1860–1870 1880-1890; 1900 1910 1920; 1930 1940 1950; 1960 1970 1980; 1990 2000 2010; 2020

Azusa first appeared as a city in the 1860 US census.

=== Racial and ethnic composition ===
Azusa city, California – Racial and ethnic composition Note: the US Census treats Hispanic/Latino as an ethnic category. This table excludes Latinos from the racial categories and assigns them to a separate category. Hispanics/Latinos may be of any race.
Race / ethnicity (NH = Non-Hispanic)	Pop 1980	Pop 1990	Pop 2000	Pop 2010	Pop 2020	% 1980	% 1990	% 2000	% 2010	% 2020
White alone (NH)	15,153	14,980	10,824	8,955	7,751	51.58%	36.24%	24.21%	19.32%	15.50%
Black or African American alone (NH)	461	1,421	1,576	1,293	1,589	1.57%	3.44%	3.52%	2.79%	3.18%
Native American or Alaska Native alone (NH)	305	150	202	114	113	1.04%	0.36%	0.45%	0.25%	0.23%
Asian alone (NH)	943	2,583	2,657	3,896	7,187	3.21%	6.25%	5.94%	8.40%	14.37%
Native Hawaiian or Pacific Islander alone (NH)	943	2,583	56	67	65	3.21%	6.25%	0.13%	0.14%	0.13%
Other race alone (NH)	75	107	103	62	234	0.26%	0.26%	0.23%	0.13%	0.47%
Mixed race or multiracial (NH)	x	x	772	646	1,041	x	x	1.73%	1.39%	2.08%
Hispanic or Latino (any race)	12,443	22,092	28,522	31,328	32,020	42.35%	53.45%	63.79%	67.57%	64.04%
Total	29,380	41,333	44,712	46,361	50,000	100.00%	100.00%	100.00%	100.00%	100.00%

=== 2020 census ===
As of the 2020 census, Azusa had a population of 50,000 and a population density of 5,175.4 inhabitants per square mile (1,998.2/km^{2}). The census reported that 94.4% of residents lived in households, 5.3% lived in non-institutionalized group quarters, and 0.3% were institutionalized.

The median age was 34.1 years; 21.2% of residents were under 18, 14.9% were 18 to 24, 28.3% were 25 to 44, 24.1% were 45 to 64, and 11.6% were 65 years of age or older. For every 100 females there were 94.2 males, and for every 100 females age 18 and over there were 90.6 males age 18 and over.

There were 14,735 households in Azusa; 38.1% had children under the age of 18 living in them. Among all households, 46.3% were married-couple households, 7.7% were cohabiting couple households, 28.4% had a female householder with no partner present, and 17.6% had a male householder with no partner present. About 17.6% of all households were made up of individuals and 6.4% had someone living alone who was 65 years of age or older. The average household size was 3.2. There were 11,071 families (75.1% of all households).

There were 15,315 housing units at an average density of 1,585.2 units per square mile (612.0 units/km^{2}), of which 3.8% were vacant. Of the 14,735 occupied housing units, 53.3% were owner-occupied and 46.7% were renter-occupied. The homeowner vacancy rate was 0.6% and the rental vacancy rate was 3.8%.

Overall, 99.6% of residents lived in urban areas and 0.4% lived in rural areas.

Racial composition as of the 2020 census
Race	Number	Percent
White	13,800	27.6%
Black or African American	1,752	3.5%
American Indian and Alaska Native	1,314	2.6%
Asian	7,384	14.8%
Native Hawaiian and Other Pacific Islander	74	0.1%
Some other race	15,623	31.2%
Two or more races	10,053	20.1%
Hispanic or Latino (of any race)	32,020	64.0%

=== 2023 American Community Survey ===
In 2023, the US Census Bureau estimated that 31.8% of the population were foreign-born. Of all people aged 5 or older, 44.9% spoke only English at home, 42.8% spoke Spanish, 2.0% spoke other Indo-European languages, 9.3% spoke Asian or Pacific Islander languages, and 1.0% spoke other languages. Of those aged 25 or older, 80.2% were high school graduates and 26.9% had a bachelor's degree.

The median household income in 2023 was $85,727, and the per capita income was $31,884. About 8.7% of families and 12.6% of the population were below the poverty line.

=== 2010 census ===
The 2010 United States census reported that Azusa had a population of 46,361. The population density was 4,794.9 inhabitants per square mile (1,851.3/km^{2}). The racial makeup of Azusa was 26,715 (57.6%) White (19.3% Non-Hispanic White), 1,499 (3.2%) African American, 562 (1.2%) Native American, 4,054 (8.7%) Asian, 87 (0.2%) Pacific Islander, 11,270 (24.3%) from other races, and 2,174 (4.7%) from two or more races. There were 31,328 people of Hispanic or Latino origin, of any race (67.6%).

The census reported that 43,559 people (94.0% of the population) lived in households, 2,691 (5.8%) lived in non-institutionalized group quarters, and 111 (0.2%) were institutionalized.

There were 12,716 households, out of which 5,955 (46.8%) had children under the age of 18 living in them, 6,310 (49.6%) were opposite-sex married couples living together, 2,275 (17.9%) had a female householder with no husband present, 1,014 (8.0%) had a male householder with no wife present. There were 891 (7.0%) unmarried opposite-sex partnerships, and 104 (0.8%) same-sex married couples or partnerships. 2,238 households (17.6%) were made up of individuals, and 761 (6.0%) had someone living alone who was 65 years of age or older. The average household size was 3.43. There were 9,599 families (75.5% of all households); the average family size was 3.85.

The population was spread out, with 12,407 people (26.8%) under the age of 18, 7,724 people (16.7%) aged 18 to 24, 13,185 people (28.4%) aged 25 to 44, 9,469 people (20.4%) aged 45 to 64, and 3,576 people (7.7%) who were 65 years of age or older. The median age was 29.3 years. For every 100 females, there were 96.0 males. For every 100 females age 18 and over, there were 92.8 males.

There were 13,386 housing units at an average density of 1,384.4 units per square mile (534.5 units/km^{2}), of which 6,802 (53.5%) were owner-occupied, and 5,914 (46.5%) were occupied by renters. The homeowner vacancy rate was 1.4%; the rental vacancy rate was 6.6%. 22,805 people (49.2% of the population) lived in owner-occupied housing units and 20,754 people (44.8%) lived in rental housing units.

During 2009–2013, Azusa had a median household income of $52,001, with 20.1% of the population living below the federal poverty line.

In 2000, Mexican and German were the most common ancestries. Mexico and the Philippines were the most common foreign countries of birth.

== Economy ==
According to the City of Azusa's FY 2014–15 Comprehensive Annual Financial Report, the top employers in the city are:

#	Employer	# of Employees
1	Azusa Pacific University	1,433
2	Azusa Unified School District	1,250
3	Northrop Grumman	859
4	City of Azusa	383
5	Costco Wholesale Corporation	295
6	S&S Foods LLC	285
7	Hanson Distributing Company	195
8	Buena Vista Food Products	186
9	Target Corporation	142
10	Artisian Screen	140

Azusa was the former home of the Lucky Lager brewery and its successor, General Brewing. Built in 1949, the facility was purchased and converted to production by Miller Brewery in May 1966. A decade later, Miller relocated its operations to the nearby city of Irwindale and the Azusa facility ceased production in 1980, eventually being demolished.

Professional sports teams

Club	Sport	Founded	League	Venue
SoCal Legends	Basketball	2005	Continental Basketball Association	Azusa Pacific University

=== Superfund site ===
Aerojet, a rocket engine manufacturer, had a plant in Azusa from World War II to 2001. In 1980, it was determined that under Aerojet's facility there was TCE water contamination in the groundwater, whose plume was entering the aquifer under the city and of the San Gabriel Valley groundwater basin. The San Gabriel Valley aquifer is very valuable, providing most of the drinking water in the area at a fraction of the cost of water imported by aqueducts. In 1985, the U.S. EPA declared it a Superfund Site.

In 1997, additional chemical contamination, mostly NDMA and ammonium perchlorate, was found in the site's groundwater. Aerojet was named the Responsible Party for the groundwater remediation (cleanup) work and expenses. Aerojet sold the property in 2001 to Northrop Grumman Corporation, but remained the Responsible Party for the pollution.

In a 2002 court decision, Aerojet and seven other San Gabriel Valley groundwater polluters agreed to provide funding to build and operate six water-treatment facilities. One of the main contaminants is perchlorate, a carcinogenic component of rocket fuels produced by Aerojet.

== Government ==
City Council elections were held on a Tuesday after the first Monday in March in odd-numbered years until the 2017 election. Effective with the 2020 California Primary election, they are held on a Tuesday after the first Monday in March of even-numbered years. The Mayor is elected to a two-year term, City Council members are elected to a four-year term and, as of 2024, elected by council district.

In the California State Legislature, Azusa is in the 22nd senatorial district, represented by Democrat Susan Rubio, and in the 48th Assembly district, represented by Democrat Blanca Rubio.

In the United States House of Representatives, Azusa is in California's 31st congressional district, represented by Democrat Gil Cisneros.

The city mayor is Edward J. Alvarez. On March 9, 2011, Azusa voters approved an agreement between Azusa Rock, Inc. and the city to address environmental issues associated with hillside mining in the area. The benefits of the proposed agreement has been questioned by several groups.

== Education ==
Public schools

Azusa is served by the Azusa Unified School District. Its schools include:

- Seven traditional elementary schools: Dalton, Hodge, Lee, Magnolia, Murray, Paramount, and Valleydale
- One Kindergarten-only elementary school: Longfellow
- Gladstone Middle School
- Azusa High School
- Sierra (Continuation) High School — a model continuation school
- Azusa Adult School

Private schools

- St. Frances of Rome Elementary School (grades K–8) — part of St. Frances of Rome Catholic Church, in the Los Angeles Archdiocese
- Azusa Pacific University — a private Christian university
- Dhammakaya Open University — a private Buddhist university

== Transportation ==
Azusa lies along the Foothill Freeway (I-210) between the San Gabriel River Freeway (I-605) and the Orange Freeway (SR 57). Azusa Avenue (SR 39) extends from the Angeles National Forest starting at San Gabriel Canyon Road/Sierra Madre Avenue south through Orange County.

Azusa serves as the terminus for the Los Angeles Metro Rail A line light rail, which stops at Azusa Downtown station adjacent to Azusa City Hall before terminating at APU/Citrus College station at the eastern border of Azusa by Citrus College. On March 5, 2016, Azusa became the eastern terminus of the first phase of the Foothill Extension of the L Line (now the northeastern terminus of the A Line) which previously operated between Los Angeles Union Station and Sierra Madre Villa station in eastern Pasadena.

The A Line operates along former Atchison, Topeka and Santa Fe Railway right-of-way purchased by the Los Angeles County Metropolitan Transportation Authority in 1993. MTA is currently pre-constructing and planning to extend the line to the end of its reserved right-of-way in Montclair, just across the San Bernardino County line. In October 2009, the MTA Board unanimously voted to include the Foothill Extension in its long-range plan, and approved funding for the construction and operation of the Foothill Extension's first phase to Azusa. This phase of the extension broke ground in June 2010.

The Metrolink San Bernardino Line stops nearby at Covina station and Baldwin Park station several times each day.

=== Principal streets ===
Azusa's main arterial streets are:

- Azusa Avenue (State Route 39) — begins in the Angeles National Forest, proceeds down from the San Gabriel Mountains and south crossing the Foothill Freeway (I-210) and I-10, and continues through Orange County to the Pacific Coast Highway.
- Foothill Boulevard — this section begins at the San Gabriel River crossing into Irwindale, and enters Azusa, passes Azusa Pacific University, and jogs north at Citrus Avenue. Continuing straight past Citrus, the street becomes Alosta Avenue, where at Amelia Avenue, it turns back into Foothill Boulevard. Irwindale and turns into Alosta Avenue and travels in front of Azusa Pacific University. The Azusa section of Foothill Boulevard was on historic U.S. Route 66.
- San Gabriel Avenue — begins at Sierra Madre Avenue, and travels south, connecting into Azusa Avenue. San Gabriel Avenue is used for the annual Azusa Golden Days Parade.

== Healthcare ==
The Los Angeles County Department of Health Services operates the Monrovia Health Center in Monrovia, serving Azusa.

== In popular culture ==
A popular running gag on the long-running radio comedy The Jack Benny Program involved a character voiced by Mel Blanc announcing the arrival or departure of a train to or from "Anaheim, Azusa, and Cuc-a-monga," all three then being small towns without rail service at the time.

Azusa boasted the world's first Go Kart factory as of 1958. The product proved very popular. Go Kart went into bankruptcy in 1963.

The city's name appeared in the title of the Jan and Dean song "Anaheim, Azusa, & Cucamonga Sewing Circle, Book Review and Timing Association" in 1964.

In 1971 Life magazine ran a cover story on teen pregnancy featuring a unique program for pregnant high school teens. The story focused on teenage mothers attending Citrus High School in Azusa. At a time when many pregnant teens were shunned by their schools and families, Citrus High School sought to help the teen mothers continue their studies while pregnant.

In Hold Back the Dawn (1941), Emmy Brown (Olivia de Havilland), a schoolmarm from Azusa, recites the claim that it "stands for everything from A to Z in the U.S.A." The same happens in A Woman's Secret (1949), with Susan Caldwell (Gloria Grahame), born and raised in Azusa, describing the town's name as "kind of a made-up name". In Six Feet Under (TV series), a professor sends an assistant to Azusa and recites the same claim, saying “that’s how you guys name your towns here”.

== Sister cities ==
Azusa has one sister city:

- Zacatecas, State of Zacatecas, Mexico

== Notable people ==
- Hank Aguirre, major league baseball pitcher
- Rocky Dennis, born with craniodiaphyseal dysplasia and subject of the motion picture Mask
- Mack Ray Edwards (1918–1971), Heavy equipment operator, and child sex abuser/serial killer
- Adore Delano, Season 7 American Idol semi-finalist, Season 6 RuPaul's Drag Race finalist, Season 2 RuPaul's Drag Race All Stars contestant, YouTube personality
- Billy Kilmer, NFL quarterback for the San Francisco 49ers, the New Orleans Saints, and the Washington Redskins
- Shinya Kimura, motorcycle builder
- Zack Padilla, world champion boxer
- Anthony Robbins, life coach and author
- Lizette Salas, professional golfer
- Judson Scott, actor
- Greggy Soriano, cake designer and reality TV personality
- Tatiana Suarez (born 1990), mixed martial artist
- Ruth Wysocki, track athlete, 1978 U.S. champion in 800 meters
- Members of Silent Planet, metalcore band
- Scheana Shay, television personality and singer

== See also ==
- Azusa Civic Center
