= St. Matthew High School =

St. Matthew High School may refer to:

- St. Matthew High School (Los Angeles, California)
- St. Matthew High School (Melrose, Louisiana), listed on the NRHP in Louisiana
- St. Matthew High School (Ottawa)
