= Lopez v. Seccombe =

1944 U.S. civil rights case

Lopez v. Seccombe. 71 F. Supp. 769. 1, US District Court for the Southern District of California, 1944, was a 1944 court case within the city and county of San Bernardino, California, about whether Mexican Americans were able to use the city's public pool at any time despite the city's restrictive limits. It was one of the "first successful judicial challenges to racial segregation".

== Background ==
=== Mexican immigration ===
Mexican migration to the Inland Empire of California expanded during the Mexican Revolution (1910–1920). During World War I, Mexican immigrants were recruited to work on ranches for periods at a time, but they were not encouraged to stay. Many Mexicans who had come to work were exploited, and if they ever did anything to displease their employers, they were easily deported. The Immigration Act of 1921 passed numerical quotas on immigration, allowing only three percent of residents of the same nationality to be recorded on the Census. The Immigration Act of 1924 reduced that quota to two percent. There were debates over immigration, with many arguing that seasonal migration was essential to the success of U.S. agriculture.

Many immigrants who came to the United States resided in California, Arizona, and Texas, with the largest concentration shifting from Texas to California through the 1920s. Most immigrants settled in the inland part of the Southern California counties of San Bernardino and Riverside. Many Mexican families settled in cities such as Claremont, Corona, Pomona, Redlands, and Upland. By 1928, more than 40 percent of all inland births were of Mexican descent. In 1929, the Central Chamber of Commerce wanted to figure out how much Mexican laborers were actually needed. Many Mexicans who were part of these communities owned or leased their homes and established familial ties to the area. Many were no longer moving back and forth between Mexico and the US.

=== Segregation ===
Court documents related to Martinez et al v. City of Pomona, et al (1941)

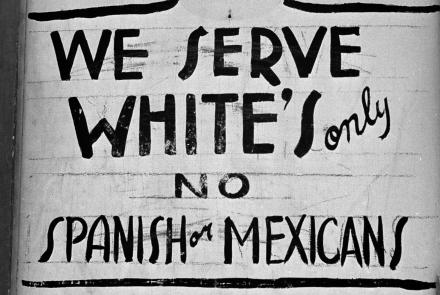
An ungrammatical example of Mexican-American segregation

Discrimination against Mexicans at public facilities prompted some individuals to reject being treated as second-class citizens. One example was when a Mexican couple wanted to be seated in the center section of a movie theater but were asked to move, simply because they were Mexican. They were given the option to sit at the very front, side aisles, or the balcony. When the male Mexican American offered to pay the difference for the better seats, he was denied. Many businesses displayed "Whites only" signs, excluding both Mexicans and other races and ethnicities.

Latinos were also forced to attend "Mexican schools" established in California cities at the time. Mexican Americans were not allowed to attend schools in their district if those schools were designated for white students. They often had to travel longer distances to attend Mexican schools. Many white education leaders argued that they were separated because Mexicans had to be taught in Spanish, but many viewed the prohibition on attending Anglo schools as unconstitutional.

At public swimming pools, Mexican Americans were allowed to swim only on one day out of the week, the day before the pool was scheduled to be cleaned. During the 1940s, there were publicized cases about swimming pools in communities such as Riverside, Colton, and San Bernardino. Riverside agreed to desegregate after being confronted by Mexican-American leaders. In San Bernardino and Colton, community leaders suggested that Mexicans swim in their own neighborhood pools, but the only pools in the Mexican neighborhoods were private pools.

3 years prior to Seccombe, multiple plaintiffs filed suit against the City of Pomona in October 1941 in the case of Martinez et al v. City of Pomona, et al.

== Background on Lopez ==
Ignacio L. Lopez was a Mexican-American civil rights activist. He had roots in Mexico, but moved to the United States at a young age and was not afraid to speak up against the discrimination he had experienced. He was born in 1907 in Guadalajara, Mexico, and became a naturalized citizen of the US. He had grown up in the San Gabriel Valley, attended high school at Pomona High School, and went on to further his secondary education at Chaffey College in Ontario and then at Pomona College in Claremont. He became a civil rights activist for Mexican Americans and went on to publish the newspaper El Espectador. His main motive in publishing the newspaper was to "support every action to combat this insult to our racial dignity ... we need that support of Every One of our readers." He further advocated for Mexican Americans to not tolerate discrimination and even openly stop purchasing goods from stores that discriminated against them. He believed that Mexican Americans "did not have to stand by passively and accept prejudice in public places." Lopez was the main plaintiff for the case of the San Bernardino public pool due to being a popular civil rights figure at the time.

== Background on Seccombe ==
William Carpenter Seccombe was born in Nova Scotia, Canada, in 1873 and moved to San Bernardino with his family in 1883. He pursued a career in pharmacy, working for various drug stores before establishing his own pharmacy business with partners. Seccombe's civic engagement extended to serving in the California National Guard and later on the San Bernardino Board of Education, where he played a role in the development of polytechnic high school campuses.

Seccombe served as mayor of San Bernardino from May 12, 1941, to May 11, 1947. When the Mexican American Defense Committee challenged the city's policies on segregation, the city council, including Seccombe, rejected the calls for integration, leading to a class action lawsuit filed against Seccombe and the city council.

== Details of the case ==
In June, San Bernardino entered one its hottest summers. The Perris Hill Plunge was a public pool located in a white neighborhood in San Bernardino. Due to the high heat, the pool was a refuge for local residents in the area; it was expecting at least 4,000 swimmers each day. Upon arriving at the pool, Mike Valles and Bobby Daste, two Latino teenagers, were asked if they were Mexican. Valles stated "Yes, I am," and he was denied entry to the pool. The worker said, "Today is not your day to swim, you need to come back on your day to swim." Daste said he was Cuban and was granted entry, which illustrated that the discrimination was specifically against Mexicans. Valles went home that day and complained to his parents. Gonzalo, his father, grew angry about the constant discrimination that he and other Mexicans had been experiencing. Gonzalo Valles decided to organize a community meeting in order to support desegregation of the Perris Hill Plunge. Many people who supported the cause showed up and advocated for access to the recreational facilities. Many also spoke against it. When Gonzalo spoke, many supported him, and they created the Mexican American Defense Committee (MADC). Mexican-American leaders, including Ignacio Lopez, Father Jose Nunes, Gonzalo Valles, Miguel Ciriza, Eligio Romo, and Eugenio Nogueras, publisher of El sol de San Bernardino, went to federal court in 1943 after many failed attempts with the city council to come up with an agreement, with the goal of using San Bernardino as a test case to force desegregation of public swimming pools.

The lawyer for the plaintiffs, David C. Marcus, argued that this form of segregation was a constitutional violation of the Fifth and Fourteenth Amendments. The Fifth Amendment states that the government may not deprive individuals of "life, liberty and property". The Fourteenth Amendment offers protection against any acts of discrimination and prohibits states from violating any individual's equal rights. Marcus argued that Mexicans were taxpayers and were entitled to the rights of the same public facilities.

=== Decision ===
The judge ruled that the San Bernardino mayor and city council were acting illegally:

This Court finds as true that each and all of Petitioners herein contribute to the financial support and maintenance of said park, playground, swimming pool, plunge, and facilities mentioned and each and all of your petitioners are citizens and contributors and are beneficially interested in the privileges, management, control, use and occupation of said facilities as heretofore stated, and as members of the public and citizens of the United States, are entitled to admission and the use and enjoyment of said playground, swimming pool, plunge, bathhouse and facilities.

The plaintiffs, and "some 8,000 other persons of Mexican and Latin descent and extraction, all citizens of the United States of America, residing within said district", were guaranteed the same rights and privileges as white residents. The "petitioners are entitled to such equal accommodations, advantages, privileges, equal rights and treatment with other persons as citizens of the United States, in the use and enjoyment of the facilities of said park and playground." Denying Mexicans entry to the pool was declared illegal on constitutional grounds. The case was later used in the Mendez v. Westminster, case which ruled against the segregation of schools in neighboring Orange County.
