= Milton L. Banks =

American basketball player

- Born: October 17, 1958; Los Angeles, California, U.S.
- Died: July 18, 2007 (aged 48)
- Education: Cal-Poly
- Occupations: Basketball player, Coach, Actor
- Style: Pro basketball, Actor
- Height: 6 ft 7 in (2.01 m)
- Spouse: Monica Banks (m. 1985)
- Children: Marcus Banks, Christin Banks-Jeter, Justin Haire Banks, Matthew Rougley, Darin Banks

Milton Leon Banks (October 17, 1958 – July 18, 2007), was an American basketball player best known for his seasons spent touring with the Harlem Globetrotters. He started his basketball career at Cal Poly Pomona in 1979, he was a member of several 3x3 (basketball), or Hoop-it-up championship teams, Dino Smiley's Drew League, and was named to the Venice Beach's basketball Hall of Fame in 2012 along the likes of Kobe Bryant.

== Early life ==
Milton Leon Banks was born on October 17, 1958, in Los Angeles, California. He is the son of the late Cleola and Herbert Banks Jr. Milton attended Russell Elementary and 28th Street School in Los Angeles. His family soon relocated to Pomona, California, where he would grow up.

== Career ==
He began his career as a basketball player after graduating from Garey High School in 1976. From there he went on to play for Mt. San Antonio College in Walnut, CA, and shortly thereafter, he returned home to Pomona to play for CPP's basketball team from 1979–1980. Milton's 6'7 stature quickly gained him notice among the NCAA division II teams. In 1993 he attracted the attention of the Harlem Globetrotters, landing a position on their team. He went on tour with the Globetrotters a few seasons which led him to accepting roles on TV, The Steve Harvey Show, and movies Sunset Park 1996, and B*A*P*S in 1997.

== Philanthropy ==
Banks was a member of Athletes in Action, and would also volunteer at local Boys and Girls Clubs of America as a mentor.

== Filmography ==
- B*A*P*S 1997
- Sunset Park (film) 1996
- The Steve Harvey Show (TV show) 1996
