= Citrus, California =

- Unincorporated community Census designated place
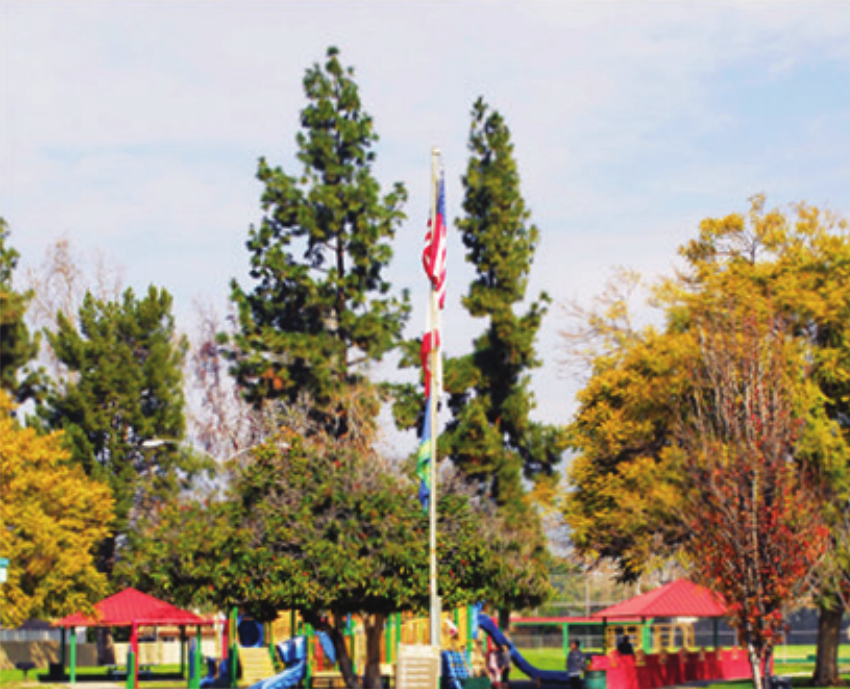
- Dalton Park
- Interactive map of Citrus, California
- Location in the United States
- Coordinates: 34°6′54″N 117°53′30″W
- Country: United States
- State: California
- County: Los Angeles

Area
  - Total: 0.88 sq mi (2.27 km^{2})
  - Land: 0.88 sq mi (2.27 km^{2})
  - Water: 0 sq mi (0.00 km^{2}) 0.17%
- Elevation: 584 ft (178 m)

Population (2020)
  - Total: 10,243
  - Density: 11,692.3/sq mi (4,514.41/km^{2})
- Time zone: UTC-8 (Pacific)
  - Summer (DST): UTC-7 (PDT)
- ZIP code: 91702, 91722, 91740
- Area code: 626
- FIPS code: 06-13560
- GNIS feature ID: 1867006

Citrus is an unincorporated community and census designated place (CDP) in Los Angeles County, California, United States. As of the 2020 census, Citrus had a population of 10,243. It is located in the San Gabriel Valley between Azusa to the north and west, Glendora to the east, and Covina to the south. It is often referred to as "unincorporated Azusa" or "unincorporated Covina" as many street postal addresses that fall under here end in one of those two cities.

== Geography ==
Citrus is located at 34°6′54″N 117°53′30″W (34.114891, -117.891786).

According to the United States Census Bureau, the CDP has a total area of 0.9 square miles (2.3 km^{2}), over 99% of which is land.

== Demographics ==
Historical population
Census	Pop.	Note	%±
1980	12,450		—
1990	9,481		−23.8%
2000	10,581		11.6%
2010	10,866		2.7%
2020	10,243		−5.7%
U.S. Decennial Census; 1860–1870 1880-1890; 1900 1910 1920; 1930 1940 1950; 1960 1970 1980; 1990 2000 2010; 2020

Citrus first appeared as a census designated place in the 1980 United States census as part of the East San Gabriel Valley census county division.

=== Racial and ethnic composition ===
Citrus CDP, California – Racial and ethnic composition Note: the US Census treats Hispanic/Latino as an ethnic category. This table excludes Latinos from the racial categories and assigns them to a separate category. Hispanics/Latinos may be of any race.
Race / Ethnicity (NH = Non-Hispanic)	Pop 1980	Pop 1990	Pop 2000	Pop 2010	Pop 2020	% 1980	% 1990	% 2000	% 2010	% 2020
White alone (NH)	8,636	3,947	2,515	1,748	1,183	69.37%	41.63%	23.77%	16.09%	11.55%
Black or African American alone (NH)	120	318	305	198	169	0.96%	3.35%	2.88%	1.82%	1.65%
Native American or Alaska Native alone (NH)	116	43	41	22	36	0.93%	0.45%	0.39%	0.20%	0.35%
Asian alone (NH)	299	600	678	837	818	2.40%	6.33%	6.41%	7.70%	7.99%
Native Hawaiian or Pacific Islander alone (NH)	299	600	1	4	6	2.40%	6.33%	0.01%	0.04%	0.06%
Other race alone (NH)	34	16	10	20	65	0.27%	0.17%	0.09%	0.18%	0.63%
Mixed race or Multiracial (NH)	x	x	170	126	160	x	x	1.61%	1.16%	1.56%
Hispanic or Latino (any race)	3,245	4,557	6,861	7,911	7,806	26.06%	48.06%	64.84%	72.81%	76.21%
Total	12,450	9,481	10,581	10,866	10,243	100.00%	100.00%	100.00%	100.00%	100.00%

=== 2020 census ===
As of the 2020 census, Citrus had a population of 10,243 and a population density of 11,692.9 inhabitants per square mile (4,514.7/km^{2}). The median age was 34.9 years. The age distribution was 22.7% under the age of 18, 11.4% aged 18 to 24, 29.5% aged 25 to 44, 25.3% aged 45 to 64, and 11.0% who were 65 years of age or older. For every 100 females, there were 99.7 males, and for every 100 females age 18 and over, there were 97.3 males age 18 and over.

The census reported that 99.8% of the population lived in households, 0.2% lived in non-institutionalized group quarters, and no one was institutionalized. 100.0% of residents lived in urban areas, while 0.0% lived in rural areas.

There were 2,616 households in Citrus, of which 45.1% had children under the age of 18 living in them. Of all households, 54.9% were married-couple households, 6.6% were cohabiting couple households, 15.1% were households with a male householder and no spouse or partner present, and 23.4% were households with a female householder and no spouse or partner present. About 10.6% of all households were made up of individuals and 3.8% had someone living alone who was 65 years of age or older. The average household size was 3.91. There were 2,218 families (84.8% of all households).

There were 2,684 housing units at an average density of 3,063.9 units per square mile (1,183.0 units/km^{2}), of which 97.5% were occupied. Of the occupied housing units, 72.0% were owner-occupied and 28.0% were occupied by renters. The homeowner vacancy rate was 0.3%, and the rental vacancy rate was 4.0%.

=== Income and poverty ===
In 2023, the US Census Bureau estimated that the median household income was $101,179, and the per capita income was $27,712. About 5.5% of families and 9.3% of the population were below the poverty line.

=== 2010 census ===
At the 2010 census Citrus had a population of 10,866. The population density was 12,231.0 inhabitants per square mile (4,722.4/km^{2}). The racial makeup of Citrus was 5,898 (54.3%) White (16.1% Non-Hispanic White), 240 (2.2%) African American, 120 (1.1%) Native American, 860 (7.9%) Asian, 4 (0.0%) Pacific Islander, 3,302 (30.4%) from other races, and 442 (4.1%) from two or more races. Hispanic or Latino of any race were 7,911 persons (72.8%).

The census reported that 10,841 people (99.8% of the population) lived in households, 25 (0.2%) lived in non-institutionalized group quarters, and no one was institutionalized.

There were 2,615 households, 1,364 (52.2%) had children under the age of 18 living in them, 1,524 (58.3%) were opposite-sex married couples living together, 442 (16.9%) had a female householder with no husband present, 229 (8.8%) had a male householder with no wife present. There were 152 (5.8%) unmarried opposite-sex partnerships, and 24 (0.9%) same-sex married couples or partnerships. 278 households (10.6%) were one person and 94 (3.6%) had someone living alone who was 65 or older. The average household size was 4.15. There were 2,195 families (83.9% of households); the average family size was 4.33.

The age distribution was 3,083 people (28.4%) under the age of 18, 1,322 people (12.2%) aged 18 to 24, 3,208 people (29.5%) aged 25 to 44, 2,402 people (22.1%) aged 45 to 64, and 851 people (7.8%) who were 65 or older. The median age was 30.7 years. For every 100 females, there were 102.2 males. For every 100 females age 18 and over, there were 101.1 males.

There were 2,701 housing units at an average density of 3,040.3 per square mile, of the occupied units 1,854 (70.9%) were owner-occupied and 761 (29.1%) were rented. The homeowner vacancy rate was 1.7%; the rental vacancy rate was 3.5%. 7,841 people (72.2% of the population) lived in owner-occupied housing units and 3,000 people (27.6%) lived in rental housing units.

According to the 2010 United States Census, the median household income was $59,919, with 10.9% of the population living below the federal poverty line.

=== Ancestry ===
In 2000, Mexican and German were the most common ancestries. Mexico and the Philippines were the most common foreign places of birth.

== Government ==
Citrus, being an unincorporated community, has no municipal government.

In the California State Legislature, Citrus is in the 22nd senatorial district, represented by Democrat Susan Rubio, and in the 48th Assembly district, represented by Democrat Blanca Rubio.

In the United States House of Representatives, Citrus is in California's 31st congressional district, represented by Democrat Gil Cisneros.

== Education ==
Most of Citrus is served by Azusa Unified School District, while parts are in Glendora Unified School District and other parts are served by Covina-Valley Unified School District.
