= Marty Keough =

American baseball player (born 1934)

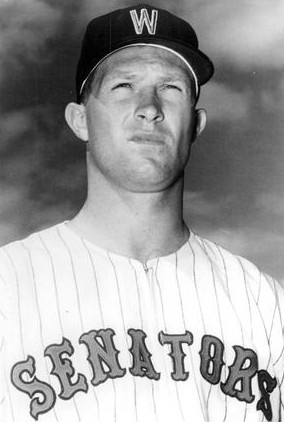
- Outfielder
- Born: April 14, 1934 (age 92); Oakland, California, U.S.
- Batted: Left Threw: Left

MLB debut
- April 21, 1956, for the Boston Red Sox

Last MLB appearance
- September 16, 1966, for the Chicago Cubs

MLB statistics
- Batting average: .242
- Home runs: 43
- Runs batted in: 176
- Stats at Baseball Reference

Teams
- Boston Red Sox (1956–1960); Cleveland Indians (1960); Washington Senators (1961); Cincinnati Reds (1962–1965); Atlanta Braves (1966); Chicago Cubs (1966); Nankai Hawks (1968)

Richard Martin Keough (/ˈkiːoʊ/ KEE-oh; born April 14, 1934) is an American former professional baseball player. He played as an outfielder in Major League Baseball for the Boston Red Sox (1956–60), Cleveland Indians (1960), Washington Senators (1961), Cincinnati Reds (1962–65), Atlanta Braves (1966) and Chicago Cubs (1966) from 1956 through 1966 . In 1968, he played in Japan for the Nankai Hawks of the Nippon Professional Baseball league. Keough batted and threw left-handed, and was listed as 6 feet (1.8 m) tall and 180 pounds (82 kg).

Born in Oakland, California, Keough is the older brother of Joe Keough, a former MLB outfielder, and father of Matt Keough, a right-handed pitcher. Matt also played in Japan, making them one of the few American father-son duos to both play there.

Marty Keough was a multi-sport star at Pomona High School. He was named the CIF Southern Section football player of the year in 1951 after leading the school to its only football championship. Months later, he was awarded the Southern Section's baseball co-player of the year, sharing the honor with Bill Richardson of Citrus High School. In 1952 he was named by the LA Examiner as overall Southern California Prep "Athlete of the Year".

Keough debuted with the Boston Red Sox in 1956, sharing outfield work with Ted Williams, Jim Piersall and Jackie Jensen, among others, until the 1960 midseason when he was traded to the Cleveland Indians. At the end of the season, he was selected by the new Washington Senators in the expansion draft. His most productive season came in 1961 with the Senators. He started 109 of the club's 161 games, and posted career numbers in hits (97), doubles (18), triples (9), home runs (9), runs (57), RBI (34), stolen bases (12), and games played (135). In 1962, he hit a career-high .278 for the Cincinnati Reds. He also played with the Atlanta Braves and Chicago Cubs.

In an 11-season MLB career, Keough was a .242 hitter with 434 hits, 43 home runs and 176 RBI in 841 games. He recorded a .986 fielding percentage playing at all three outfield positions and first base.

He remained in the game as a scout since the end of his playing days, and as of 2009 is a longtime member of the scouting staff of the St. Louis Cardinals.

== See also ==
- List of second-generation Major League Baseball players
