= Brandon Sermons =

American gridiron football player (born 1991)

No. 21
- Position: Defensive back

Personal information
- Born: June 1, 1991 (age 35); Bellflower, California, U.S.
- Listed height: 5 ft 11 in (1.80 m)
- Listed weight: 195 lb (88 kg)

Career information
- High school: Pomona (CA) Diamond Ranch
- College: UCLA

Career history
- 2014: Arizona Cardinals*
- 2015: San Jose SaberCats*
- 2015–2016: Ottawa Redblacks
- * Offseason or practice squad member only
- Stats at CFL.ca
- Stats at ArenaFan.com

Brandon William Sermons (born June 1, 1991) is an American former professional football defensive back. He played college football at the University of California, Los Angeles. He was a member of the Arizona Cardinals, San Jose SaberCats, and Ottawa Redblacks.

== Early life ==
Sermons played high school football at and Diamond Ranch High School in Pomona, California.. He helped Diamond Ranch to the Southeast Division title game. He recorded 51 tackles in 12 games his senior year. Sermons was rated the No. 28 prospect in California by Rivals.com. He was also rated the No. 33 cornerback nationally by both ESPNU and Rivals.com. He participated in track and field at Diamond Ranch as well.

== College career ==
Sermons played for the UCLA Bruins from 2009 to 2013. He missed the 2010 season due to a leg injury suffered in spring practice. He played in the last nine games of his freshman season in 2009. Sermons appeared in twelve games in 2011 and nine games in 2012. He played in twelve games, starting four, his senior year in 2013 and totaled 38 tackles. He accumulated a career-high seven tackles against the Washington Huskies during the 2013 season and also six tackles against Virginia Tech in the Sun Bowl. Sermons played in 42 games during his college career, recording 46 tackles. He majored in anthropology at UCLA.

== Professional career ==
Sermons signed with the Arizona Cardinals of the National Football League (NFL) on May 12, 2014 after going undrafted in the 2014 NFL draft. He was released by the Cardinals on August 25, 2014.

Sermons was assigned to the San Jose SaberCats of the Arena Football League on October 29, 2014. He was placed on recallable reassignment by the team on March 23, 2015.

Sermons signed with the Ottawa Redblacks of the Canadian Football League on May 28, 2015. He played in seven games for the Redblacks during the 2015 regular season, recording six defensive tackles, five special teams tackles and one sack. He also played in the 103rd Grey Cup. Sermons played in two games for the Redblacks in 2016, totaling three defensive tackles and two special teams tackles. He was released by the team on July 15, 2016.
