= Ignacio L. Lopez =

Mexican-American civil rights activist and newspaper publisher

Ignacio Lutero Lopez
- Born: March 19, 1908; Guadalajara, Jalisco, Mexico
- Died: July 4, 1973 (aged 65); Los Angeles, California, U.S.
- Education: Pomona College (BA)
- Spouses: Beatriz Anaya Lopez (m. 1929; died 1953): Rachelle Dubin Henteloff
- Children: 2

Ignacio Lutero Lopez (born March 19, 1908) was a publisher of a Spanish language newspaper in the United States, a civil rights activist and the Spanish Speaking Coordinator for the Department of Housing and Urban Development.

== Early life and education ==
Born in Guadalajara, Jalisco in Mexico, Lopez moved to the United States when young. He was raised by his preacher father and homemaker mother as the third of five children. He attended Pomona High School and went on to Pomona College, receiving a Bachelor of Arts degree in 1931. He became a naturalized U.S. citizen on September 21, 1938.

== Activism ==
Lopez founded the Spanish-language newspaper El Espectador in 1933 which ran until 1960. The newspaper was initially geared towards community events updates for Mexican-Americans living in the areas, which eventually evolved to include civil rights activism. Lopez tackled such topics as police brutality and segregation in his editorial writing. He went used his platform successfully to organize boycotts against businesses that practiced segregation against Mexican-Americans.

Lopez won a suit against a city of San Bernardino for discriminatory practices in accessing the city's public pools, in which it was successfully argued that the actions violated the Fifth and Fourteenth Amendment. The case, Lopez v. Seccombe went on to be cited in a memorandum brief during arguments for Brown v. Board of Education.

Lopez went on to serve as the Spanish Speaking Coordinator Department of Housing and Urban Development until his death in 1973.

== Legacy ==
In Sept. 25, 2007, an elementary school in Pomona was named in Lopez's honor, as Lopez Elementary School. The Lopez Urban Farm connected with the school also bears his name.
