= Ron Brown (wide receiver) =

American football player (born 1961)

No. 89, 24, 81
- Position: Wide receiver

Personal information
- Born: March 31, 1961 (age 65); Los Angeles, California, U.S.
- Listed height: 5 ft 11 in (1.80 m)
- Listed weight: 181 lb (82 kg)

Career information
- High school: Baldwin Park (Baldwin Park, California)
- College: Arizona State
- NFL draft: 1983: 2nd round, 41 (by the Cleveland Browns)th overall pick

Career history
- Los Angeles Rams (1984–1989); Los Angeles Raiders (1990); Los Angeles Rams (1991)

Awards and highlights
- First-team All-Pro (1985); Pro Bowl (1985)

Career NFL statistics
- Receptions: 98
- Receiving yards: 1,791
- Receiving touchdowns: 13
- Return yards: 4,493
- Return touchdowns: 4
- Stats at Pro Football Reference

Ronald James Brown (born March 31, 1961) is an American former athlete and professional football player. Nicknamed "Speedball", he won a gold medal in the 4 × 100 metres relay at the 1984 Summer Olympics. Brown played as a wide receiver in the National Football League (NFL). He went to Arizona State University.

== High school career ==
Brown played high school football at powerhouse Baldwin Park High School in Baldwin Park, California until his senior year. He then moved to Northern California and played for Northgate High School in Walnut Creek.

== Track and field ==
Olympic medal record

Men's athletics

Representing the United States
Gold medal – first place	1984 Los Angeles	4 × 100 m relay

Brown was also a track star, he ran the second leg in the 4 × 100 metres relay team that won the gold medal and set the world record in the 1984 Summer Olympics in Los Angeles, with a time of 37.83 seconds.

Brown also competed in the 60 meters, 100 meters and 200 meters, posting personal bests of 6.64 seconds, 10.06 seconds and 20.44 seconds, respectively.

== Football career ==
Brown was drafted in the second round of the 1983 draft by the Cleveland Browns, but never reported to them as he was training for the Olympics. The Browns traded their rights to the Los Angeles Rams, and Brown joined the Rams after the Olympics. He caught 23 passes in 1984 for 478 yards with four touchdowns as a rookie in 1984 before being tasked to return kicks the following year. In 1985, he returned 28 kicks for 918 yards for three touchdowns (his touchdowns and 32.8 yards per return were league highs). This resulted in Pro Bowl and All-Pro honors. Only his 1989 year would exceed that season, with him returning 47 (a league high) for 968 yards. In his eight seasons, he recorded 1,000 all-purpose yards (receiving + returns) four times (1985–87, 1989) before his career ended in 1990 at the age of 30.

Brown appeared in the 1986 Rams promotional video, Let's Ram It, where he went by the name "Speedball Brown" and claimed to be the fastest man in town.

=== Personal bests ===
Event	Time (seconds)	Venue	Date
60 meters	6.64	Tokyo, Japan	March 10, 1984
100 meters	10.06	Zurich, Switzerland	August 24, 1983
200 meters	20.44	Eugene, Oregon	June 4, 1983
