= Vincent, California =

- Census-designated place
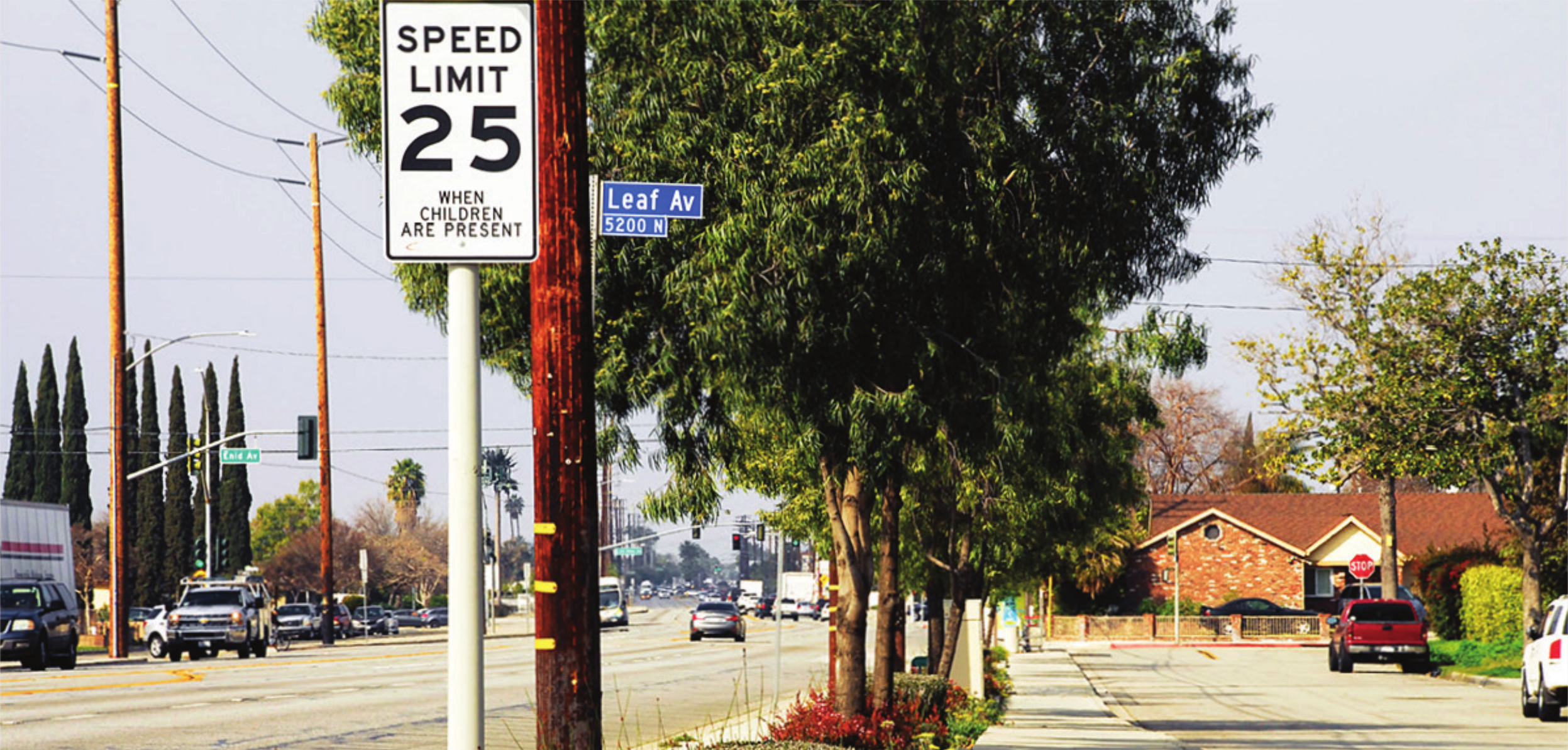
- Interactive map of Vincent, California
- Location in the United States
- Coordinates: 34°5′55″N 117°55′28″W
- Country: United States
- State: California
- County: Los Angeles

Area
  - Total: 1.473 sq mi (3.815 km^{2})
  - Land: 1.473 sq mi (3.815 km^{2})
  - Water: 0 sq mi (0 km^{2}) 0%
- Elevation: 3,225 ft (983 m)

Population (2020)
  - Total: 15,714
  - Density: 10,670/sq mi (4,119/km^{2})
- Time zone: UTC-8 (PST)
  - Summer (DST): UTC-7 (PDT)
- ZIP code: 91702, 91722
- Area code: 626
- FIPS code: 06-82814
- GNIS feature ID: 1661642

Vincent, also known as East Irwindale, is a census-designated place (CDP) in the central San Gabriel Valley, in Los Angeles County, California, United States. As of the 2020 census, Vincent had a population of 15,714. The city name and zipcode for addresses south of Arrow Highway is Covina and 91722, and, for addresses north of Arrow Highway, Azusa and 91702.

== Geography ==
Vincent is located at 34°5′55″N 117°55′28″W (34.098555, -117.924395).

According to the United States Census Bureau, the CDP has a total area of 1.5 square miles (3.9 km^{2}), all land.

== Demographics ==
Historical population
Census	Pop.	Note	%±
1990	13,713		—
2000	15,097		10.1%
2010	15,922		5.5%
2020	15,714		−1.3%
U.S. Decennial Census; 1860–1870 1880-1890; 1900 1910 1920; 1930 1940 1950; 1960 1970 1980; 1990 2000 2010; 2020

Vincent first appeared as a census designated place in the 1990 U.S. census as part of the East San Gabriel Valley census county division.

=== Racial and ethnic composition ===
Vincent CDP, California – Racial and ethnic composition Note: the US Census treats Hispanic/Latino as an ethnic category. This table excludes Latinos from the racial categories and assigns them to a separate category. Hispanics/Latinos may be of any race.
Race / Ethnicity (NH = Non-Hispanic)	Pop 2000	Pop 2010	Pop 2020	% 2000	% 2010	% 2020
White alone (NH)	3,679	2,391	1,517	24.37%	15.02%	9.65%
Black or African American alone (NH)	377	271	227	2.50%	1.70%	1.44%
Native American or Alaska Native alone (NH)	51	42	33	0.34%	0.26%	0.21%
Asian alone (NH)	1,002	1,082	1,774	6.64%	6.80%	11.29%
Native Hawaiian or Pacific Islander alone (NH)	7	24	19	0.05%	0.15%	0.12%
Other race alone (NH)	15	31	66	0.10%	0.19%	0.42%
Mixed race or Multiracial (NH)	242	160	225	1.60%	1.00%	1.43%
Hispanic or Latino (any race)	9,724	11,921	11,853	64.41%	74.87%	75.43%
Total	15,097	15,922	15,714	100.00%	100.00%	100.00%

=== 2020 census ===
As of the 2020 census, Vincent had a population of 15,714. The population density was 10,668.0 inhabitants per square mile (4,118.9/km^{2}). The age distribution was 21.4% under the age of 18, 10.8% aged 18 to 24, 28.1% aged 25 to 44, 26.4% aged 45 to 64, and 13.3% who were 65 years of age or older. The median age was 37.3 years. For every 100 females there were 96.9 males, and for every 100 females age 18 and over there were 96.2 males age 18 and over.

The census reported that 99.7% of the population lived in households, 0.2% lived in non-institutionalized group quarters, and 0.1% were institutionalized. 100.0% of residents lived in urban areas, while 0.0% lived in rural areas.

There were 4,054 households, out of which 43.5% had children under the age of 18 living in them. Of all households, 55.3% were married-couple households, 6.9% were cohabiting couple households, 22.9% had a female householder with no spouse or partner present, and 14.9% had a male householder with no spouse or partner present. About 9.7% of all households were made up of individuals, and 4.8% had someone living alone who was 65 years of age or older. The average household size was 3.86. There were 3,499 families (86.3% of all households).

There were 4,116 housing units at an average density of 2,794.3 units per square mile (1,078.9 units/km^{2}), of which 4,054 (98.5%) were occupied. Of the occupied units, 77.3% were owner-occupied and 22.7% were occupied by renters. The homeowner vacancy rate was 0.5% and the rental vacancy rate was 1.5%.

=== Income and poverty ===
In 2023, the US Census Bureau estimated that the median household income was $99,157, and the per capita income was $31,427. About 3.8% of families and 5.9% of the population were below the poverty line.

=== 2010 census ===
At the 2010 census Vincent had a population of 15,922. The population density was 10,827.3 inhabitants per square mile (4,180.4/km^{2}). The racial makeup of Vincent was 8,670 (54.5%) White (15.0% Non-Hispanic White), 312 (2.0%) African American, 146 (0.9%) Native American, 1,128 (7.1%) Asian, 31 (0.2%) Pacific Islander, 4,857 (30.5%) from other races, and 778 (4.9%) from two or more races. Hispanic or Latino of any race were 11,921 persons (74.9%).

The census reported that 15,899 people (99.9% of the population) lived in households, 18 (0.1%) lived in non-institutionalized group quarters, and 5 (0%) were institutionalized.

There were 3,900 households, 2,063 (52.9%) had children under the age of 18 living in them, 2,367 (60.7%) were opposite-sex married couples living together, 661 (16.9%) had a female householder with no husband present, 361 (9.3%) had a male householder with no wife present. There were 217 (5.6%) unmarried opposite-sex partnerships, and 22 (0.6%) same-sex couples or partnerships. There were 364 households (9.3%) consisting of one person, and 149 (3.8%) had someone living alone who was 65 or older. The average household size was 4.08. There were 3,389 families (86.9% of households); the average family size was 4.21.

The age distribution was 4,536 people (28.5%) under the age of 18, 1,823 people (11.4%) aged 18 to 24, 4,488 people (28.2%) aged 25 to 44, 3,656 people (23.0%) aged 45 to 64, and 1,419 people (8.9%) who were 65 or older. The median age was 32.4 years. For every 100 females, there were 98.9 males. For every 100 females age 18 and over, there were 97.9 males.

There were 4,016 housing units at an average density of 2,731.0 per square mile, of the occupied units 3,085 (79.1%) were owner-occupied and 815 (20.9%) were rented. The homeowner vacancy rate was 1.1%; the rental vacancy rate was 4.9%. Most of the population, 12,261 people (77.0%), lived in owner-occupied housing units; 3,638 people (22.8%) lived in rental housing units.

=== Mapping L.A. ===
Mapping L.A. reported that Mexican and German were the most common ancestries according to the 2000 census. Mexico and the Philippines were the most common foreign places of birth.

== Politics ==
In the state legislature, Vincent is located in the 22nd senatorial district, represented by Democrat Susan Rubio, and in the 48th Assembly district, represented by Democrat Blanca Rubio. Federally, Vincent is located in California's 31st congressional district, represented by Democrat Gil Cisneros.

== Education ==
Vincent is served by Azusa Unified and Covina-Valley Unified School Districts.
