= Slauson Middle School =

The name Slauson Middle School may refer to

- An intermediate school in the Azusa Unified School District
- Slauson Middle School (Ann Arbor, Michigan)
