= Ruth Wysocki =

American middle distance runner (born 1957)

Ruth Wysocki (born March 8, 1957, in Alhambra, California) is an American middle distance runner who specialized in the 800 meters and 1500 metres.

Wysocki began track competition in age-group races in the late 1960s, and continued her track career over a period of about 30 years, until she became a Masters (over-40) runner in 1997. Wysocki was a standout performer in the 800 m at Azusa High School in Azusa, California, winning the California State championship at 440 y and 880 y. Running for Citrus College as Ruth Caldwell, she won the CCCAA California State Cross Country Championships in both 1977 and 1978. Later in those seasons, she won the 1978-9 championships at both 800 meters and 1500 meters. Her victories at the Southern California Championships remain the records in both those events. She attended the University of Redlands, where she excelled at 400 and 800 m.

Wysocki first won fame in American middle-distance running when she upset Mary Decker to win the 1978 US Championships 800 m in 2:01.99. Wysocki scored another upset victory against Decker (now Slaney) at the 1984 US Olympic Trials, this time at 1500 m. Wysocki outsprinted Slaney to win the Trials in 4:00.18. At the 1984 Summer Olympics, held in Los Angeles, California, she finished sixth in 800 m and eighth in 1500 m. She finished seventh in 1500 m at the 1995 World Championships in Athletics in Gothenburg, Sweden at age 38.

In 1997, Wysocki set several Masters records at distances from 800 m – 5000 m on the track, and 5k and 8k road races. Her 800 meters and 1500 meters were ratified as American W40 records on December 5, 2020, more than 23 years after the performances. Her father, Willis Kleinsasser, was also a successful Masters athlete. Her brother, Alan Kleinsasser, ran 1:50.5 for 800 m and 3:52.2 for 1500 m, both school records at Caltech.

Ruth is married to Tom Wysocki, who qualified for the 1980 Summer Olympics that were held in Moscow, as the alternate on the 10,000 m team, though the United States boycotted that competition.

== Personal bests ==
Distance	Time	Year
880 y	2:10.7	1974 (High School)
400 m	56.8	1975 (College)
800 m	2:06.80	1978 (College)
1500 m	4:18.9	1978 (College)
440 y	55.0	1975
800 m	1:58.65	1984
1000 m	2:38.36	1995
1500 m	4:00.18	1984
Mile	4:21.78	1984
2000 m	5:40.09	1984
3000 m	8:52.91	1987
5000m	16:37.22	1985
800 m	2:03.95	1997 (masters)
1000 m	2:40.42	1997 (masters)
1500 m	4:08.69	1997 (masters)
5000 m	16:37.22	1997 (masters)
