= Cornell Webster =

American football player (1954–2022)

No. 38
- Position: Cornerback

Personal information
- Born: November 2, 1954; Greeneville, Tennessee, U.S.
- Died: July 7, 2022 (aged 67)
- Listed height: 6 ft 0 in (1.83 m)
- Listed weight: 180 lb (82 kg)

Career information
- High school: Garey (Pomona, California)
- College: Tulsa
- NFL draft: 1977: undrafted

Career history
- Seattle Seahawks (1977–1980)

Career NFL statistics
- Interceptions: 8
- Fumble recoveries: 3
- Touchdowns: 1
- Stats at Pro Football Reference

Cornell Preston Webster (November 2, 1954 – July 7, 2022) was an American professional football player who was a cornerback for four seasons for the Seattle Seahawks.
