= Baldwin Park Unified School District =

School district in California, United States

Address
- 3699 N Holly Ave Baldwin Park, Los Angeles County, California, 91706-5397; United States

District information
- Grades: KG-12
- School board: 5
- Schools: 18
- NCES District ID: 0603690
- District ID: CA-1964287

Students and staff
- Students: 10,291
- Faculty: 496.59 (on an FTE basis)
- Student–teacher ratio: 20.72:1

Other information
- Website: www.bpusd.net

Baldwin Park Unified School District is a public school district based in Baldwin Park, a city in the central San Gabriel Valley region of Los Angeles County, California, United States. The school district covers all of Baldwin Park and the southern portion of Irwindale. The Governing Board is composed of five members, elected at large, serving a four-year term. The elections are held on a Tuesday after the first Monday in November of even-numbered years, effective with the 2018 election…

== Schools ==
=== High School ===
- Baldwin Park High School
- North Park High School
- Sierra Vista High School

=== Middle School ===
- Jones Middle School
- Olive Middle School
- Sierra Vista Middle School

=== 3rd to 8th grade ===
- BP STEM Academy

=== Elementary ===
- Charles Bursch Elementary
- De Anza Elementary
- Ernest R. Geddes elementary
- Foster Elementary
- Kenmore Elementary
- Tracy Elementary
- Vineyard Elementary
- Walnut Elementary
