= Lighthouse Christian Academy =

Private school in Santa Monica, California, United States

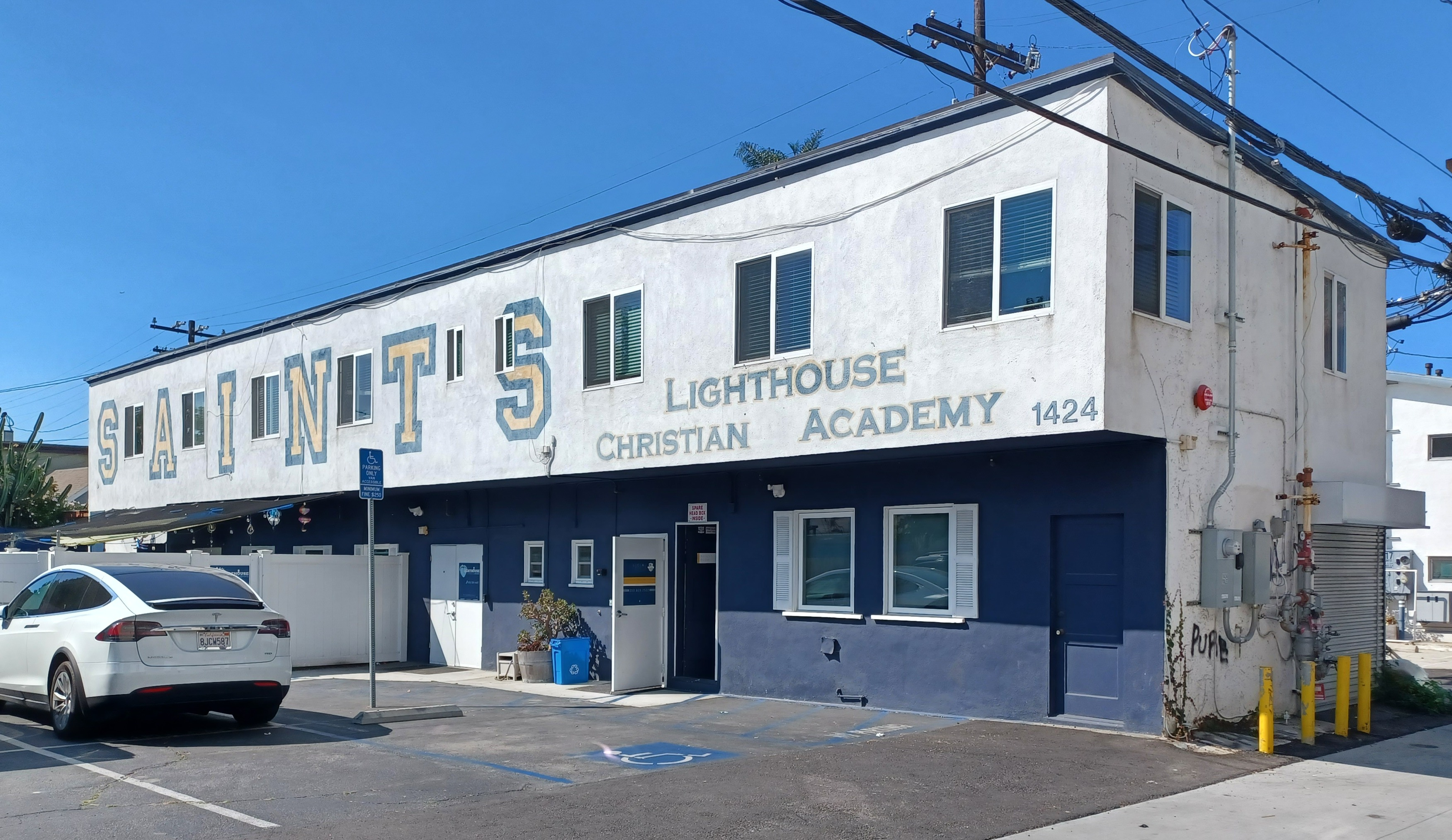

Location
- 34.034774°N 118.471384°W

Information
- Established: 1992
- Website: www.thelighthousechristianacademy.com

Lighthouse Christian Academy, in Santa Monica, California, is an American private, college preparatory Christian school founded in 1992 as an outgrowth of the Lighthouse Church School (founded in 1983). As of 2007, it is accredited by the International Christian Accrediting Association, an independent Christian educational association.

== History ==
The Academy was an extension of the Lighthouse Church School, a ministry of the Lighthouse Church in Santa Monica. It started in the rooms of the church and was taught mostly by parents who wanted an alternative to the secular education of the public schools. But enrollment growth prompted the purchase of the separate campus for the high school in 2004, about a mile from the Lighthouse Church School. The college preparatory school is largely the brainchild of Lighthouse Church Senior Pastor Rob Scribner, a former UCLA and LA Rams football player

== Enrollment and international students ==
Enrollment is currently about 50 students. Its student body is 34% white, 34% Hispanic, 14% African American, 8% Asian, 10% international. Tuition is $6000, though much higher for international students. In addition to their studies, international students receive housing with a host family.

== Academics ==
The Academy is accredited by AdvancED under the taxonomy of North Central Association of Colleges and Schools. The student to teacher ratio is 10:1, and the school claims that 80% of its graduates go on to four-year universities.

== Athletics ==
The Academy is a member of the California Interscholastic Federation, Southern Section and Harbor League. In 2004 and 2005, the Academy's volleyball team won the CIF league championship, and in the years 1997 and 2004 the football team won runner-up.

== Notable alumni ==
- Joy Womack, former Bolshoi ballerina
- Jordan Payton, UCLA wide receiver
