= Sequoyah School =

Coordinates: 34.151369°N 118.161256°W

Location
- 535 S Pasadena Ave; Pasadena, California; Pasadena, Los Angeles, California 91105; United States

Information
- Type: Independent, Co-educational, Day school, Community service
- Established: 1958
- Head of school: Rebecca Hong
- Faculty: 40
- Enrollment: approx. 440
- Student to teacher ratio: 10:1
- Mascot: Gryphon
- Alumni: Phoebe Bridgers
- Website: sequoyahschool.org

The Sequoyah School is a non-profit, co-ed, independent K-12 school in Pasadena, California, United States.

== Information ==
The school, which was founded in August 1958, is located at the base of the San Gabriel Mountains, situated on 2.25 acres (9,100 m^{2}) of property leased from the California Department of Transportation.

Sequoyah School has two campuses, and the student body has upwards of 440 students.

== Campus ==
The K-8 campus was originally the site of an 1887 shingle-style church. In the 1950s, the architecture firm Smith and Williams designed two buildings on the site. They built a children's chapel (1954) and a Sunday-school building (1956). Garrett Eckbo designed the grounds. The children's chapel won an AIA Award of Merit in 1954. The Sequoyah School became a part-time tenant of the church in 1958. The original church was demolished in 1974 when Caltrans was planning to expand the 710 Freeway through the site, but the project remains unrealized due to community opposition. The Smith and Williams buildings remains to this day.

In 2013, the campus was expanded by Los Angeles architecture firm, Fung + Blatt Architects. Weaving into the existing mid-century campus fabric, Sequoyah's expansion echoes the spirit of the original architecture, while providing a sustainable, contemporary interpretation for a new generation. The expansion was published in Architectural Record and also won an honor award for design and a sustainability award by the AIA Pasadena & Foothills chapter

The high school campus is located on the grounds of the Neighborhood Church in Pasadena, adjacent to the historic Gamble House and within walking distance of playing fields in the Arroyo and the Rose Bowl Aquatic Center. It is only a few miles away from the K-8 campus. The high school campus are also neighbors with special education school Westmoreland Academy that opened in 2013. Both schools share the same block.

== Financial Aid ==
Sequoyah School maintains a financial assistance program that provides tuition support to approximately 30-40% of its student population, including its Yvonne Pinto Fund, dedicated to the students of employees of the school. The School is well known for its ethnic, racial, gender, cultural, and economic diversity.

== Governance ==
The school is governed by a board of trustees.
