= Diamond Ranch High School =

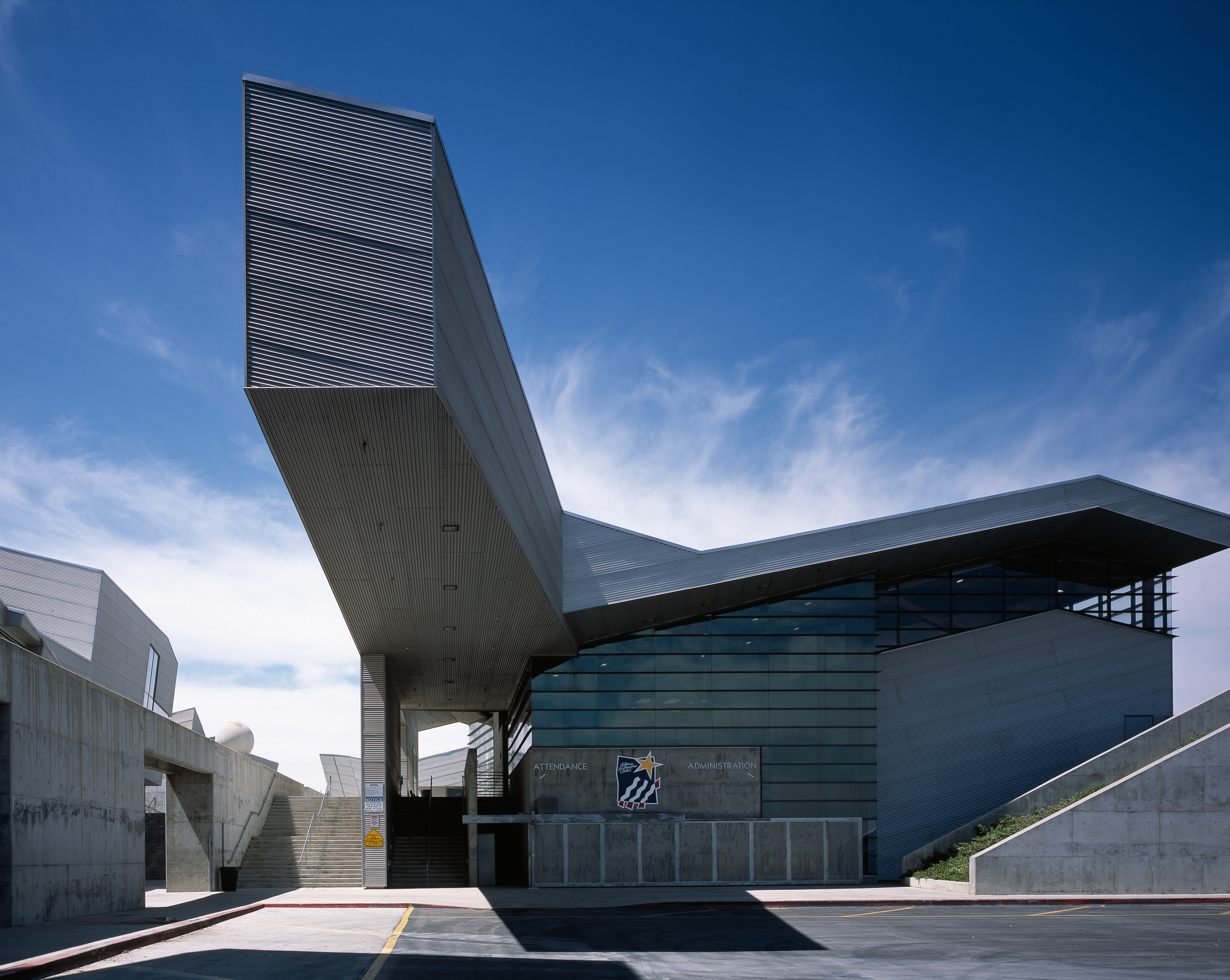

Location
- 100 Diamond Ranch Drive; Pomona, California 91766; United States
- 34°01′19″N 117°46′47″W

Information
- Type: Public
- Established: 1997
- School district: Pomona Unified School District
- Principal: Mark Gomez
- Staff: 67.34 (FTE)
- Grades: 9–12
- Enrollment: 1,581 (2018–2019)
- Student to teacher ratio: 23.48
- Campus size: 72 acres
- Colors: Blue, black and silver
- Nickname: Panthers
- Website: diamondranch.pusd.org

Diamond Ranch High School (or DRHS) is a high school that serves students from Diamond Bar and Phillips Ranch, California, United States, and is operated by the Pomona Unified School District (PUSD) in Pomona, California – part of the Greater Los Angeles MSA. Diamond Ranch's athletic teams compete in the Hacienda League of the CIF Southern Section.

== Architecture ==
The school was designed in an expressionist modern style by Morphosis and Thomas Blurock Architects, led by architect Thom Mayne of Morphosis. It is situated on a steep hillside on land previously considered unusable. The school's unique architectural design was recognized in the book Morphosis/Diamond Ranch High School.

Because of its modernist architecture, size and location in California, the school has appeared in movies such as The Cell, Orange County, Serenity, Live Free or Die Hard, and The Thinning. It has also appeared in several television commercials—including one for Buick.

== Name ==
The name was derived from its geographical location at the junction between the City of Diamond Bar and Phillips Ranch, in Pomona, California. The school is also near to the city of Chino Hills, California.

== Timeline ==
- June 1991 – PUSD voters approved a $62.5 million general obligation bond to improve school facilities district-wide, including approximately $10 million designated for Diamond Ranch. In addition to the money provided by the district, the City of Industry provided $5.4 million for the extensive grading needed to create building pads for the school, and sold 80 acres (320,000 m^{2}) of undeveloped land to PUSD for a dollar.
- November 1993 – The school district hires Morphosis to design the school.
- September 5, 1997 – DRHS was officially opened for students, while construction continues.
- September 8, 1997 – The inaugural of the first principal, Albert Webb
- 1999–2000 – DRHS is established and students move from the portables to the permanent facility.
- June 8, 2001 – The first graduating class of DRHS.
- 2003 – DRHS wins California's Distinguished School Award.
- 2007 – DRHS wins California's Distinguished School Award for the second time.
- 2013 – DRHS Wins one of America's Best High Schools Award.
- 2014 – DRHS wins The Daily Beast Top High Schools Award, Washington Post Top High Schools Award, U.S. Best High Schools Award (Silver)
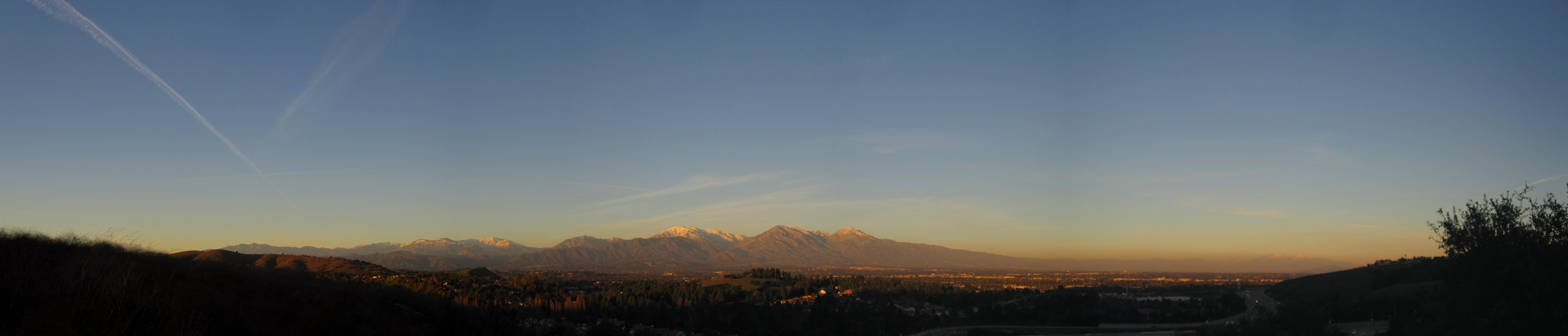
View of Pomona Valley from Diamond Ranch High School

== Notable alumni ==
- Charles Brown – NFL offensive lineman
- Brandon Sermons – American football player
- Brendan Hines-Ike - American soccer player
