= Azusa High School =

Location
- 240 N Cerritos Ave; Azusa, California 91702; United States
- Coordinates: 34°07′33″N 117°53′54″W

Information
- School type: Public
- Motto: Every Student College And Career Ready
- Established: 1956; 70 years ago
- School district: Azusa Unified School District
- CEEB code: 050188
- NCES School ID: 060360000268
- Principal: Gabriel Fernandez
- Staff: 63.34 (FTE)
- Faculty: Approximately 157
- Grades: 9–12
- Gender: Coeducational
- Enrollment: 1,480 (2025–26)
- Student to teacher ratio: 19.66
- Campus type: Suburban
- Colors: Light Blue, white, and black
- Slogan: Once An Aztec, Always An Aztec!
- Athletics conference: CIF Southern Section; Montview League
- Mascot: Jaguar
- Accreditation: WASC – 6 years IBO
- Yearbook: Turoquoi
- Feeder schools: Gladstone Middle School
- Website: https://ahs.azusa.org/

Azusa High School is a public high school in Azusa, California, United States, a city east of Los Angeles and east of the San Gabriel Valley. It is the flagship high school for the Azusa Unified School District. In addition to offering multiple Advanced Placement courses. Azusa High School is an IB (International Baccalaureate) school.

== Enrollment ==
Azusa High School has had an enrollment of about 1,416 students in 2011–2012 school year. Azusa High School is integrated in the school years of 2011–2012 with, 0.2% American Indian/Alaska Native, 1.1% Asian, 0.3% Native Hawaiian/Pacific Islander, 1.7% Filipino, 90.6% Hispanic, 1.0% Black, and 4.4% White.

For the 2025 - 2026 school year, Azusa High School's enrollment was approximately 1,480 students.

== Athletics ==
Currently, Azusa High School offers its students 16 athletic teams. All sports teams are associated with the Montview League and participate in the CIF Southern Section.

These sports include:

- Badminton
- Baseball
- Basketball - Boys & Girls Teams
- Cheer
- Cross Country - Boys & Girls Teams
- Football
- Flag Football - Girls Team
- Golf
- Wrestling
- Track & Field
- Soccer - Boys & Girls Teams
- Softball
- Swim
- Tennis - Boys & Girls Teams
- Track & Field
- Volleyball - Boys & Girls Teams

== Aztec Band and Pageantry Corps ==
The Azusa High School Aztec Band & Pageantry Corps is associated with the Southern California School Band and Orchestra Association (SCSBOA).

== Notable people associated with this school ==
- Jim Eppard, former MLB player (California Angels, Toronto Blue Jays)
- John Littlefield, former MLB player (Saint Louis Cardinals, San Diego Padres)
- Lizette Salas – professional LPGA Tour golfer
- Colin Ward, former MLB player (San Francisco Giants)
- Ruth Wysocki – Olympic middle distance runner
