= Baldwin Park High School =

Location
- 3900 N Puente Ave; Baldwin Park, California 91706; United States; 34°05′03″N 117°56′54″W

Information
- Type: Public
- Motto: Home of the Braves
- Established: 1956; 70 years ago
- School district: Baldwin Park Unified School District
- NCES School ID: 060369000324
- Principal: Deborah Madrigal
- Staff: 69.90 (FTE)
- Grades: 9–12
- Enrollment: 1,000 (2022–23)
- Student to teacher ratio: 20.23
- Colors: Blue and White
- Mascot: Brave
- Website: www.bpbraves.net

Baldwin Park High School is located in Baldwin Park, California. It is part of the Baldwin Park Unified School District. It is one of three high schools in the city, Sierra Vista High School and North Park Continuation School being the other two. Student feeder schools are: Holland Middle School (6-8), Olive Middle School (6-8), Santa Fe Elementary (3-8) and about half from Jones Junior High (7-8) and very few from Sierra Vista Junior High (7-8). The school colors are Royal blue, white and silver. The school mascot is a Brave (Native American).

== Teachers ==
While the state average has one full-time teacher for 20 students, in this school it is 32 students per teacher. 98% of the teachers in the school have a full teaching credential, while the other 2% are emergency issued. Most teachers at Baldwin Park High School have been in the BPUSD an average of 11 years.

== Demographics ==
White	Latino	Asian	African American	Pacific Islander	American Indian	Two or More Races
1%	93%	5%	1%	0%	0.1%	0%

According to U.S. News & World Report, 99% of Baldwin Park's student body is "of color," with 88% of the student body coming from an economically disadvantaged household, determined by student eligibility for California's Reduced-price meal program.

== Sports ==
Baldwin Park offers the following sports: Baseball, Softball, Football, Basketball, Tennis, Badminton, Wrestling, Track & Field, Cross Country running, Cheerleading, Swimming, Volleyball, Water Polo and Soccer.

== Entertainment Corps ==
The Baldwin Park HS Marching Band and Colorguard have been finalists at the SCSBOA (Southern California Band and Orchestra Association) for the past nine years (since 2005). The Winterguard is the current WGASC Champion in the Intermediate A Division. The drumline is a former two-time champion in the Scholastic A division for American Drumline Association. It now competes in the Southern California Percussion Alliance.

Baldwin Park is known mostly for its soccer team although on campus football is still considered the most significant sport. On the other side, soccer is the second-biggest sport in school; over 85% of students are of Latino descent. The current rise in the sport's popularity and level of competition has encouraged the Baldwin Park Braves to compete at CIF finals the last 5 consecutive seasons. The team has competed at three championship tournaments and has won a CIF title under the leadership of coach Ricardo Mira.

At the WGASC 2013 Championship competitions, Baldwin Park High School placed 8th out of 9 teams in the division.

== Notable alumni ==
- Gary Allen, former NFL player
- Ron Brown: 1984 Olympic gold medalist, former NFL player (1984-1991)
- J. J. Davis, former professional baseball player (Pittsburgh Pirates, Washington Nationals)
- Bernardo Flores, professional baseball player (Chicago White Sox, Saint Louis Cardinals)
- Roger Freed, former professional baseball player (Baltimore Orioles, Philadelphia Phillies, Cincinnati Reds, Montreal Expos, St. Louis Cardinals)
- Mike Haffner, former NFL player
- Richard Kiel, actor, "Jaws (James Bond)"
- Randy Knorr: executive for Washington Nationals, former professional baseball player (Toronto Blue Jays, Houston Astros, Florida Marlins, Texas Rangers, Montreal Expos)
- Kent McCord, actor, Adam-12
- Fred McNeill, 1970, former NFL player
- Rod McNeill, 1969, former NFL player
- Lawrence Phillips, former NFL player and CFL Grey Cup champion (2002)
