= Animo Locke Technology High School =

Coordinates: 33.934867°N 118.260097°W

Animo Locke Tech High School
- 325 E 111th St; Los Angeles, California 90061; United States

Information
- Type: Public
- Established: September 4, 2007
- School district: Green Dot Public Schools
- President: Marshall Tuck
- Principal: Blain Lamar Watson
- Grades: 9-12
- Colors: Black and brown
- Mascot: Saints

Animo Locke Technology High School is a public high school in Los Angeles, California, US. The school opened on September 4, 2007, and is part of the Green Dot Public Schools.

== Issues ==
In May 2008, Animo Locke was one of several schools cancelling field trips because of the cost of transportation.
