= Da Vinci Schools =

Coordinates: 33°54′29″N 118°22′34″W

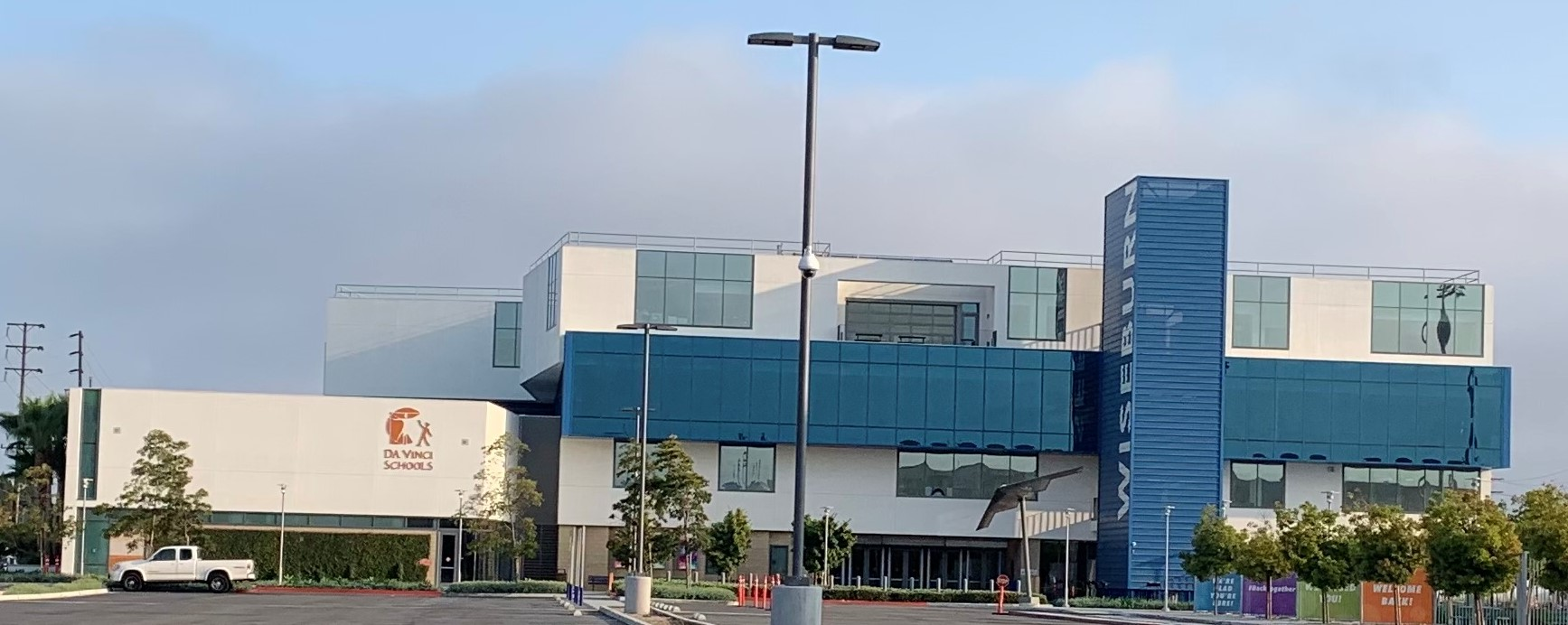

Location
- 201 N. Douglas Street; El Segundo, California

Information
- Type: Public, Charter
- Opened: 2009
- President: Chet Pipkin
- Grades: K-12+
- Enrollment: 2,700+
- Feeder schools: Wiseburn Middle School (Priority Admission) and many more
- Website: www.davincischools.org

Da Vinci Schools is a public school network in Los Angeles, California, with six schools and a college and career program serving 2,700+ students from 126 zip codes.

In Fall 2017, Da Vinci Communications, Da Vinci Design and Da Vinci Science high schools co-located to a new Wiseburn campus at 201 N. Douglas Street, El Segundo, CA. Da Vinci Schools serve as the residence high schools for the Wiseburn Unified School District in a unique district-charter partnership model.

Da Vinci Schools are fully accredited by the Western Association of Schools & Colleges (WASC) and are a member of the Coalition of Essential Schools.

== Schools ==
Da Vinci Connect (TK-8) is a public school offering families a unique learning model that combines homeschool and on-campus instruction using project-based and social emotional learning.

Da Vinci Connect High School is a public school that combines in-person and remote learning. Students take college classes beginning in 9th grade with additional opportunities to work toward an AA or Bachelor's degree—all at no cost to students and families.

Da Vinci Communications High School offers a college-prep, project-based, real-world curriculum with career pathways in computer science, multimedia journalism, marketing, and media production.

Da Vinci Design High School offers a college-prep, project-based, real-world curriculum with career pathways in architecture, entrepreneurship, and graphic design.

Da Vinci RISE High offers an individualized education for students experiencing foster care, housing instability, the juvenile justice system, and other youth who have struggled in a traditional school setting.

Da Vinci Science High School offers a college-prep, project-based, real-world curriculum with career pathways in mechanical engineering, civil engineering, and biomedical engineering.

Rivet School with Da Vinci is a college and career program for Da Vinci seniors who opt to stay at Da Vinci to earn an Associate's, Bachelor's degree, or one-year of transferable college credit for free through Da Vinci's college partners, Southern New Hampshire University and Arizona State University (ASU). Students participate in a flexible, online accredited degree program with opportunities for career-connected learning experiences through internships, project consults, and boot camps in the community. Da Vinci seniors who choose to continue their journey with Rivet School with Da Vinci will enroll in college at no cost to the student or their family. Da Vinci is committed to providing a pathway to associate and bachelor's degree completion without financial barriers.

== Curriculum & philosophy ==
Da Vinci students are preparing for college, career and life simultaneously through a project-based, real world curriculum that is shaped by industry and higher education partnerships to ensure students have access to a broad range of choices when they leave Da Vinci.

Da Vinci Schools' graduation requirements are aligned with the UC/Cal State admission requirements. 95% of the Class of 2023 graduates met the UC and CSU “A-G” requirements for admission (51% above the 2023 State Average); 71% of graduates received four-year university offers (2012-2023); 82% of Da Vinci graduates enroll in college immediately after high school, 20% above state and national averages; 91% of Da Vinci students persist in the second year of college, 15% above the national average. Since inception, Da Vinci has 3,471 Alumni who collectively have earned 73 Certificates, 382 A.A. degrees, 592 Bachelor degrees, 38 Master degrees, and 1 PhD.

== Community partnerships ==
Da Vinci Schools has partnered with many corporate, nonprofit and education institutions. Community partners offer students and faculty access to expert knowledge, industry-specific curriculum, internship opportunities, mentoring, teacher training, dual enrollment programs, career guidance, volunteer support, direct funding, and much more.

Some of Da Vinci Schools’ partners include: Northrop Grumman, Belkin International, The Boeing Company, Chevron Corporation, Raytheon, SpaceX, Gensler, 72andSunny, Karten Design, Project Lead the Way, El Camino College, Arizona State University, Southern New Hampshire University, Cal Poly San Luis Obispo, Loyola Marymount University, and many more.

== Advisory ==
Every student is enrolled in an Advisory class for the full 4 years of high school that includes students from 9-12 grade. The advisory class is a place where students can bond with each other, get academic support, and have a safe place to share their feelings.

== Seminars (electives) ==
Seminar classes (similar to electives) are practical, real-world non-core classes. Some recent seminar classes have included: Architecture and Design, Vehicle Design, Puppetry, Toy Design, Game Theory, Product and Industrial Design, Web Programming, Robotics, Flight School, Aerospace Engineering, Rocketry, Creative Writing, Leadership, Youth and Government, Drama, Yearbook, CrossFit, Yoga, Photography, and many more.

== Extracurricular activities ==
Da Vinci Schools offer extracurricular activities, including CIF sports, performing arts (theater, choir, studio orchestra), after-school clubs, and much more.
