= Pomona Unified School District =

School district in California

Pomona Unified School District or PUSD serves approximately 30,000 Pre-K-12 students and 17,000 adult learners at 44 schools in Pomona and Diamond Bar, California. It is located 30 miles east of downtown Los Angeles, and is the fourth-largest school district in Los Angeles County.

In 1995 the school district bought the former Indian Hill Mall, a failing shopping center built in the 1960s, and redeveloped it into an educational, commercial and retail complex called The Village at Indian Hill.

In November 2008, 75% of voters approved Measure PS, a $235 million school bond measure, to provide for the renovation of schools. The first of the Measure PS projects were completed in summer 2009. Another round of projects was set for summer 2010, at 21 schools.

== Board of education ==
- Adrienne Konigar-Macklin, President
- Andrew S. Wong, Vice-President
- Dr. Roberta A. Perlman, Member
- Lorena Gonzalez, Member
- Arturo Jimenez, Member

Board of Education members are elected to a four-year term. The elections are held on a first Tuesday after the first Monday in November of even-numbered years effective with the 2018 election.

== Administration ==
- Superintendent: Darren Knowels
- Deputy Superintendent, Human Resources: Darren Knowles
- Interim Assistant Superintendent, Educational Services: Lilia Fuentes
- Interim Assistant Superintendent, Chief Financial Officer: Sandra Garcia
- Assistant Superintendent, Pupil & Community Services: Fernando Meza
- Public Information Officer: Oliver Unaka

== Pomona Unified Schools ==
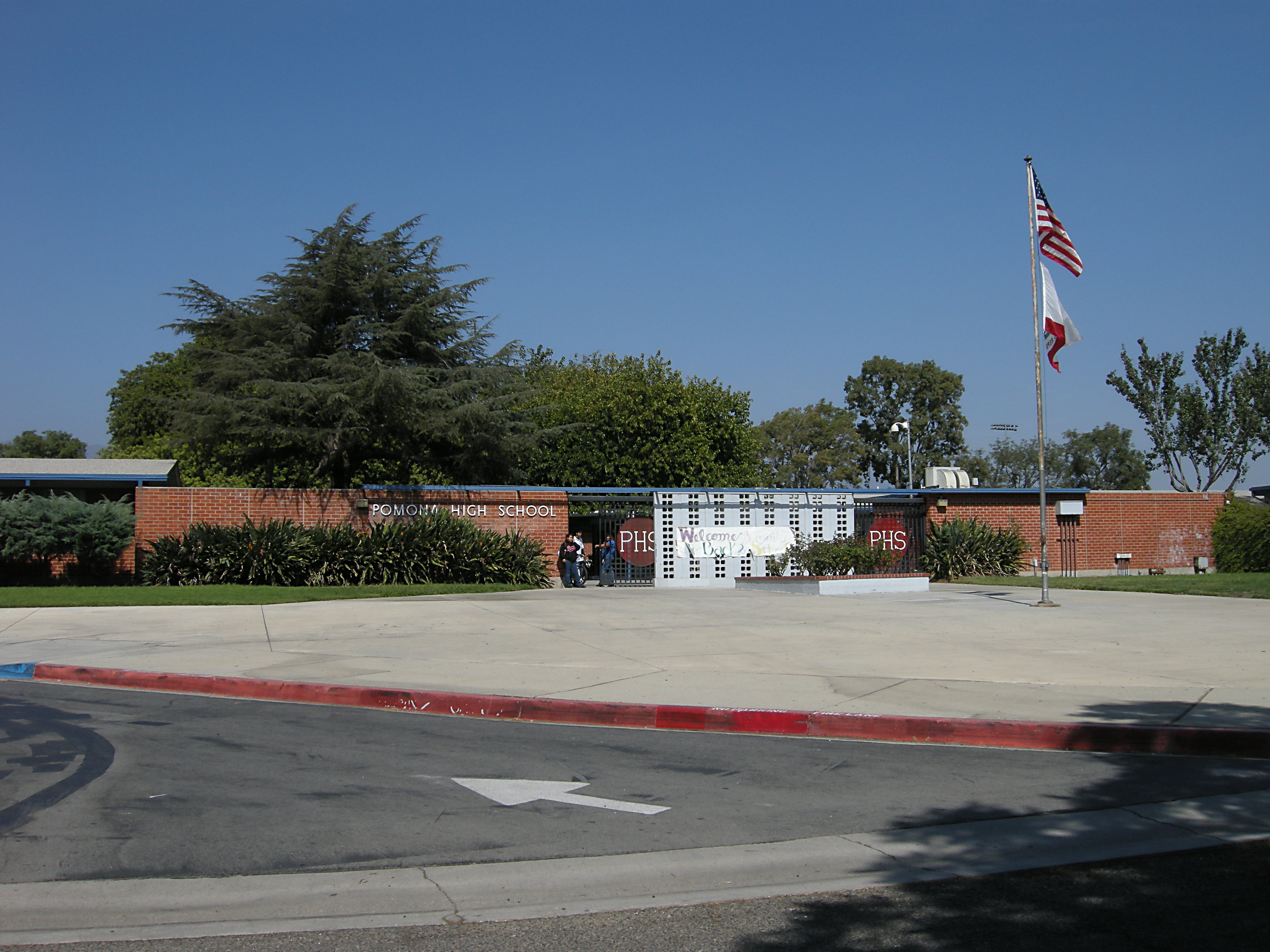
Pomona High School

All sections in the city are zoned to an elementary, middle, and high school.

- Elementary Schools
- Middle Schools
  - Emerson Middle School
  - Fremont Academy of Engineering and Design
  - Lorbeer Middle School - California Distinguished School, 1999; National Blue Ribbon School, 1999–2000
  - Marshall Middle School
  - Palomares Academy of Health Sciences
  - Simons Middle School
- High Schools
  - Diamond Ranch High School - California Distinguished School, 2003, 2007. One of America's 600 Best High Schools, U.S. News & World Report, 2007, 2008
  - Ganesha High School a Gold Ribbon School 2015 and Title 1 Academic Achievement School 2015
  - Garey High School
  - Park West High School
  - Pomona High School - California Distinguished School, 1992
  - Village Academy High School - One of America's 600 Best High Schools, U.S. News & World Report, 2007, 2008; California Distinguished School, 2009; Title I Academic Achievement Award, 2006–07, 2007–08, 2008–09
- Other Schools
  - School of Extended Educational Options (SEEO) - District-dependent charter school serving grades 7-12
  - Pomona Alternative School
  - Pomona Adult and Career Education
- Child Development Program
  - Head Start
  - State Preschool
  - Los Angeles Universal Preschool (LAUP)
  - Early Head Start
  - Cal-SAFE
  - Resource and Referral
  - Alternative Payment
  - CalWORKS

== Pomona High School sexual assault ==
On January 23, 2024, a Los Angeles Superior Court jury ordered for Pomona Unified School District to pay $35 million in damages to a former Pomona High School student who claimed the school district and high school covered up how one their track coaches raped her in 1997. This accuser was one of nine female accusers who alleged they were sexually assaulted by male coaches who served at the high school.
