= Pomona High School (Pomona, California) =

California public school

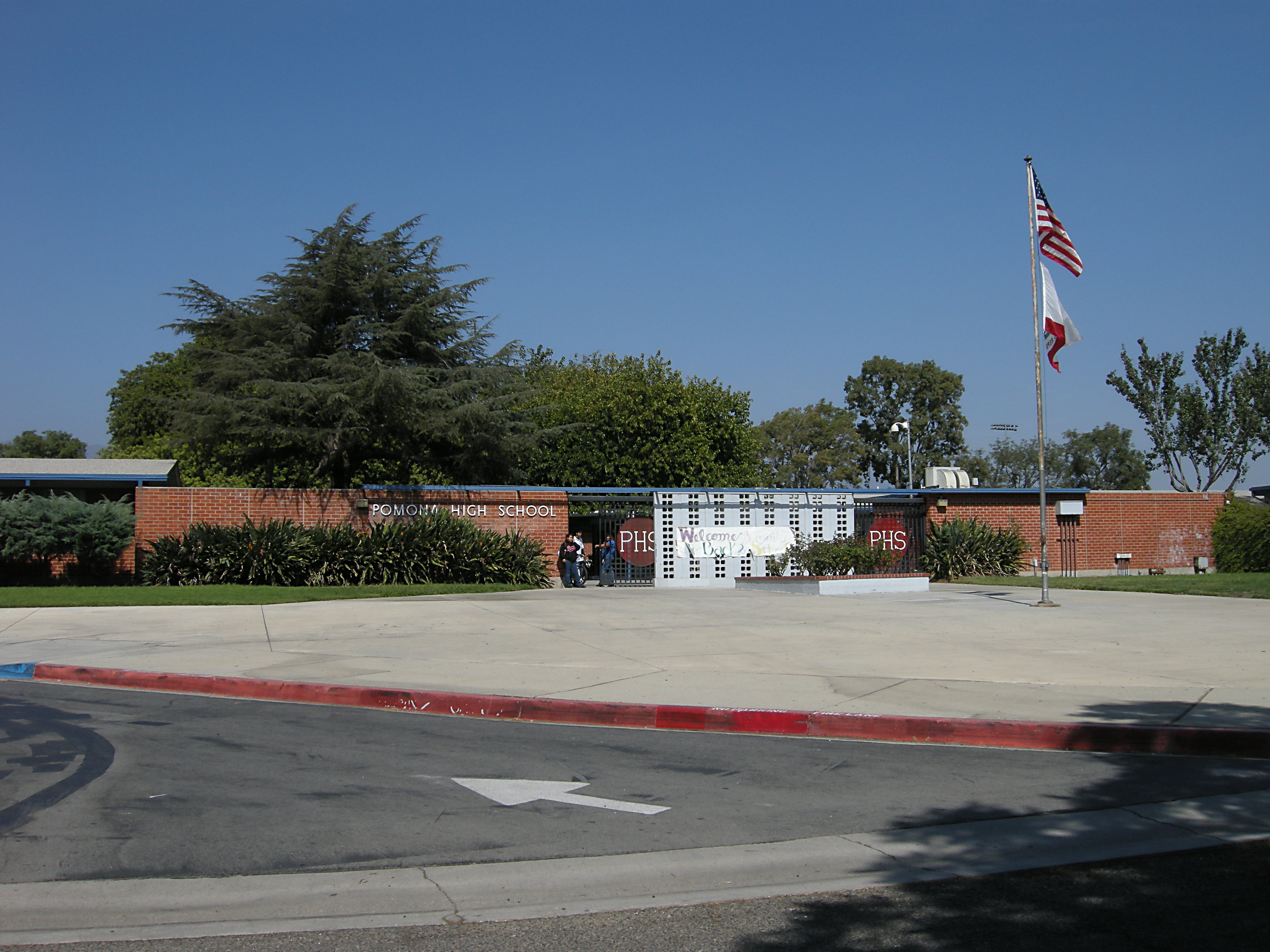

Location
- 475 Bangor St. Pomona, Los Angeles County, California 91767; United States; 34°05′06″N 117°44′28″W

Information
- Type: Public
- Established: 1900s
- Staff: 56.00 (FTE)
- Grades: 9–12
- Enrollment: 1,099 (2018–19)
- Student to teacher ratio: 19.62
- Color
- Athletics conference: CIF Southern Section; Miramonte League
- Mascot: Red Devil
- Rival: Garey High School
- Website: https://pomona.pusd.org/

Pomona High School (or PHS) is a high school (secondary school) operated by the Pomona Unified School District (PUSD) in California, located in North Pomona at 475 Bangor St. In 2002 and 2003, the Pomona High School football team won the Valle Vista League championship.

== History ==
In the 1970s, the school established a program where students provide counseling services to their fellow students. The program requires months long training. Students are required to notify the advisor regarding any statements indicating any desire to cause harm, and the students themselves do not provide advice.

== Athletics ==
On December 5, 2014, the varsity football team won the CIF Southern Section football championship. Pomona High defeated Paraclete High School by a score of 37-29 to win its first CIF-SS championship since 1951.

== Sexual assault lawsuits ==
On January 23, 2024, a Los Angeles Superior Court jury ordered for the Pomona Unified School District to pay $35 million in damages to a former student who claimed the school and school district covered up how one of their track coaches raped her in 1997. This accuser was one of nine female accusers who alleged they were sexually assaulted by male coaches who served at the high school. The lawsuit also alleged the coaches drank alcohol and smoked marijuana while on duty, and supplied kids with alcohol.

== Notable alumni ==
- Hamza Abdullah, NFL player
- Husain Abdullah, NFL player and younger brother of Hamza
- Doug Bird, Major League Baseball Pitcher
- Tank Collins, former expatriate professional basketball player
- Torri Edwards, sprinter
- Jerry Green, expatriate professional basketball player
- Marty Keough, Professional Baseball Player
- Lila Kiser, model
- Sugar Shane Mosley, boxer
- Bob Seagren, Pole vault Olympic Gold/Silver Medalist/actor/entrepreneur
- Bill Singer, former MLB player
- Dedrique Taylor, Cal State Fullerton Head Basketball Coach
- Delanie Walker, NFL player
- Jimmy Verdon NFL player, College Coach
- Janeene Vickers, sprinter
- Azeem Victor NFL Player
- Bob Hargrove, All-State Wrestler, All American Linebacker
- Walter Knott, grower of the Boysenberry and founder of Knott's Berry Farm in Buena Park
