= Garey High School =

California public school

Coordinates: 34.0379°N 117.7521°W

- 321 W Lexington Ave; Pomona, California; United States

Information
- Type: High school
- Established: 1962
- School district: Pomona Unified School District
- Oversight: Pomona Unified School District
- Principal: Roddy Layton
- Grades: 9–12
- Gender: Coeducational
- Enrollment: 1,604 (2022–2023)
- Colors: Blue and gold
- Mascot: Viking
- Rival: Ganesha High School
- Accreditation: Western Association of Schools and Colleges
- Website: http://garey.pusd.org

Garey High School is a public school serving grades 9–12. It is located in Pomona, California and is part of the Pomona Unified School District. The school opened in 1962, and its 2019–2020 enrollment was 1723 students.

== History ==
Garey High School was one of four major building projects planned by the Pomona Unified School District Board of Education in 1961. It was named for Thomas A. Garey, a Pomona pioneer "associated with the incorporation of Pomona, as well as the incorporation of Artesia and Garey, California", a leading horticulturalist and a founder of the Southern California Horticultural Association.

The school was situated in the south part of the district so senior high students could avoid having to travel to the new Pomona High School, situated in North Pomona.

The firm Blurock, Ellerbroek & Associates of Corona del Mar, architects for the project, said they planned the building "according to the loft plan. This plan... applies advancements the construction site without costly remodeling."

The first construction bids were rejected because the lowest bid of $1,103,600 was over the state allowable limit for the project. The State Board of education finally did approve the low bid of the second round, for $1,046,500, submitted by Berry Construction Company of Ontario, California. Ground-breaking took place on December 20, 1961, with expected completion prior to fall opening of the school year.

Lynn Rountree, formerly the principal of several Pomona elementary schools, was named the first principal of Garey High. On September 11, 1962, 443 freshman and sophomore students attended the first day of school at Garey High, amid carpentry and plumbing constructions sounds. Several buildings were not yet completed, including the cafeteria, gym showers, and shop buildings. A news story the following summer reported, "Plumbers, electricians, metal workers, welders, steel workers, cement finishers and many others are working against the start-of-school deadline." An additional 300 students were expected, as juniors and seniors had attended the previous year at the old Pomona High. Five portable classrooms were brought in to accommodate them.

The second phase of construction in 1963 included a gymnasium and auditorium, at a cost of $352,322.

A 1970 cafeteria arson fire caused $5000 damage, after a series of racial disturbances. Following the fire, all three high schools in the area (Ganesha, Pomona, and Garey) were closed. Police made no arrests in the arson case.

The Garey Fine Art Center, part of the school's master plan, was completed in 1977.

Accreditors in 1977 identified as strengths the harmony among the ethnically mixed student body and the faculty, as well as the academic programs. Attendance was cited as the only major weakness found by the accreditation team.

In 2013, a new Garey High Stadium was dedicated in front of 2000 "students, parents, faculty, alumni and neighbors".

=== Student accomplishments ===
- Garey High's 1968 cheerleading squad won the California state cheerleading championship, for the fourth year in a row.
- The 1980 Garey Football team was undefeated up until the final league game, but the team was penalized over a technicality: missing documentation for a player who had transferred to Garey that had been approved by a ruling of the California Interscholastic Federation (CIF). The paperwork was presented and the team maintained its first-place ranking in the CIF Southeastern Conference polls.
- Senior Karina Aguilar earned a perfect score on the 2016 Advanced Placement Spanish and Culture exam, one of 55 students in the world to earn that honor.
- The school was one of fifteen high schools to win the 2017–18 Lemelson-MIT InvenTeam grant for invention projects. Their invention was a "Device to monitor and trim toenails for people with diabetic neuropathy".
- In January 2020, Samsung announced Garey High School as one of 100 STEM project award winners, a $15,000 prize for the school.

=== Student data ===
In 2017–2018, the student teacher ratio was 26:1.

Enrollment data for 2019–2020 shows 95% of the students are of Hispanic or Latino ethnicity, 1.5% are African American, 1.9% are Asian American, and all other ethnicities total 1.6%.

The 2018–2019 Smarter Balanced Summative Assessments reported that 39.44% of the students met or exceeded the English language arts standards, and 16.67% of the students met or exceeded mathematics standards.

== Notable alumni ==
- Greg Ballard – former NBA player
- Milton L. Banks – former professional basketball player, Harlem Globetrotters
- Alberto Dávila – former WBC bantamweight champion
- Darryl Harris – former NFL running back
- Claudie Minor – former NFL offensive tackle
- Shane Turner – former MLB third baseman / outfielder
- Vince Velasquez – MLB pitcher (currently a free agent as of April 2024)
- Cornell Webster – former NFL cornerback
- Dom Williams – former NFL wide receiver
