= Azusa Unified School District =

School district in California, United States

Location
- 546 S. Citrus Ave. Azusa, CA 91702 San Gabriel Valley United States

District information
- Grades: Pre-K–12
- Superintendent: Arturo Ortega
- Schools: 7 Elementary Schools, 1 Middle School, 2 High Schools

Students and staff
- Students: Approximately 11,000

Other information
- Website: www.azusa.org

Azusa Unified School District is a public unified school district based in Azusa, California, in Los Angeles County, California, United States. The district serves students in Azusa, the northwestern portion of Covina, parts of southeast Irwindale, the northern portion of Vincent, most of Citrus, and the western portion of Glendora. The Board of Education is composed of five members, elected at large, serving a four-year term. The elections are held on a Tuesday after the first Monday in November of even-numbered years starting with the 2018 election.

== Schools ==
=== Elementary schools ===
- Henry Dalton
- Victor Hodge
- Charles Lee
- Longfellow (Pre K–Kindergarten)
- Magnolia
- Clifford Murray
- Paramount
- Valleydale

==== Former ====
- Gladstone Street Elementary (Repurposed in 2019)
- Mountain View (Closed in 2019)
- Powell (closed in 2022)

=== Middle school ===
- Gladstone Middle School

==== Former ====
- Slauson Junior High School (Closed in 2023)
- Foothill Middle School (Repurposed in 2023)
- Center Middle School (Closed in 2023)
- Ellington K-8 School (Closed in 2023)

=== High schools ===
- Azusa High School
- Sierra High School (Continuation School)

==== Former ====
- Gladstone High School (repurposed in 2023)

=== Adult school ===
- Azusa Adult Education Center (formerly Gladstone Street Elementary)

== Closures ==
In recent years, due to declining enrollment rates, Azusa has seen numerous school closures. Gladstone Street Elementary School was closed and repurposed as a continuation high school; while Mountain View Elementary closed permanently in 2019. All existing middle schools and Ellington, Azusa's K-8 school, were closed to be replaced by Gladstone Middle School in 2023, which was repurposed as a middle school for the 2023-2024 school year. Powell Elementary later closed in 2022. These school closures were done to concentrate the students in a smaller number of schools. All high school-aged students will go to Azusa High School. Foothill Middle School will be repurposed as the eastern campus for Azusa High School.
