= Sierra Vista High School (California) =

Location
- 3600 N. Frazier St. Baldwin Park, California 91706; United States; 34.0752°N 117.9790°W

Information
- Type: Public
- Motto: Home of the Dons
- Established: 1961; 65 years ago
- School district: BPUSD
- Principal: H. Vincent Pratt
- Staff: 76.41 (FTE)
- Grades: 9–12
- Enrollment: 1,712 (2023-2024)
- Student to teacher ratio: 22.41
- Colors: Red, black, and white
- Mascot: Don
- Website: Official website

Sierra Vista High School (SVHS) is a four-year comprehensive high school located in Baldwin Park, California. It opened in 1961 and is part of the Baldwin Park Unified School District. It is one of three high schools in the city, Baldwin Park High School and North Park Continuation School being the other two. Feeder schools include Sierra Vista Junior High School (7–8), Olive Middle School (6–8), and Jones Junior High (7–8) and Santa Fe (3–8). The school colors are Red and Black. The school mascot is a Don. The Dons are part of the Montview League for most sports. The top sports are Wrestling, Baseball, Boys' and Girls' soccer, Boys' and Girls' Track & Field, and Football . Students can join over 50 academic and social clubs.

In the 2012–2013 school year, a new three-story building was completed and opened for classes to be held.

In late 2017, H. Vincent Pratt became the interim principal.

== Electives ==
- Int/Adv Piano
- Symphonic Band
- Jazz Ensemble
- Wind Ensemble
- Concert Orchestra
- Concert Choir
- Vocal Ensemble
- Art I, II, III
- Commercial Art I, II, III
- Photography I, II
- Ceramics
- Sculpture
- Digital Art/ Video
- Technology
- Video/web design
- JavaScript web/game design
- Avid Senior Seminar
- Architectural Design
- Department aide

== AP Classes Offered ==
- AP Art History
- AP Calculus AB/BC
- AP Biology
- AP Computer Science Principles
- AP Drawing
- AP English Language and Composition
- AP English Literature and Composition
- AP Physics
- AP Psychology
- AP Spanish Language and Culture
- AP Spanish Literature and Culture
- AP Studio Art 2D/ AP Studio Art 3D
- AP U.S. Government and Politics
- AP U.S. History
- AP Chemistry
- AP World History: Modern
- AP Environmental Science

== Language Classes ==
- Spanish I, II, III
- Native Spanish II, III
- AP Spanish Language and Culture
- AP Spanish Literature and Culture
- Mandarin I, II

== Notable alumni ==
- Keith Closs- Former NBA player, Los Angeles Clippers.
- Carlos Ochoa- former Mexican National Soccer Team player.
