= Gladstone Middle School (California) =

Location
- 1340 North Enid Avenue; Covina, California 91722; United States; 34.1046°N 117.9135°W

Information
- School type: Public
- Established: 2023; 3 years ago
- School district: Azusa Unified School District
- CEEB code: 050190
- NCES School ID: 060360000273
- Principal: Sam Perdomo
- Grades: 6-8
- Gender: Coeducational
- Campus type: Suburban
- Colors: Red, white, and black
- Athletics conference: San Gabriel Valley Middle School Sports League
- Mascot: Gladiators
- Feeder schools: Henry Dalton Elementary, Victor Hodge Elementary, Charles Lee Elementary, Magnolia Elementary, Clifford Murray Elementary, Paramount Elementary, Valleydale Elementary
- Website: gms.azusa.org

Gladstone Middle School is a middle school located at 1340 North Enid Avenue in Covina, California, United States. It is part of the Azusa Unified School District.

The athletic teams of Gladstone Middle School are known as the Gladiators and compete in the San Gabriel Valley Middle School Sports League.

The school was reutilized in 2023 as a middle school following the termination of its use as a High School, due to the reorganization efforts of the Azusa Unified School District.
