= Scholarships in the United States =

A scholarship is defined as a grant or payment made to support a student's education, awarded on the basis of academic or other distinction. "Scholarship" has a different meaning in the United States than it does in other countries, with the partial exception of Canada. Outside the U.S., scholarship is any type of monetary award to fund education. In the United States, the only country with a national system that determines a student's financial need (see Expected Family Contribution), and where universities are far more expensive than in other countries, a scholarship is money for which the student must qualify in some way, and the term "grant" - an award the student receives because of financial need - is used for what in other countries are called scholarships.

Scholarships in the U.S. are awarded based upon various criteria, which usually reflect the values and purposes of the donor or founder of the award. Some scholarships for college are merit-based. Merit scholarships might be awarded based on academic achievement or on a combination of academics and a special talent, trait, or interest. Other scholarships are based on financial need. Scholarship money is not required to be repaid. Scholarships are not a large component of college financial aid in the United States; they are far surpassed by grants, for which the only qualification is financial need, interest-free loans (while the student is in college), and subsidized campus employment. (See Student financial aid in the United States.) A student who receives a scholarship may find other (need-based) financial aid reduced by the amount of the scholarship, so the net benefit of the scholarship to the student — especially the poor student — may be zero.

== Scholarships versus grants ==
In the U.S., a grant is given on the basis of economic need, determined by the amount to which the college's Cost of Attendance (COA) exceeds the Expected Family Contribution (EFC), calculated by the U.S. Department of Education from information submitted on the Free Application for Federal Student Aid (FAFSA) following formulas set by the United States Congress. (The federal EFC is sometimes modified, usually upwards, in awarding non-federal grants.) The federal Pell grant program is an entitlement: if the applicant meets the requirements - has economic Need (COA exceeds EFC), is studying at least half time towards a first undergraduate degree, is a U.S. citizen or eligible alien - the award of the money is automatic. The student has a right to it (is entitled).

In some cases, obtaining scholarships does not help the student or their family. Scholarships reduce financial need, which can cause need-based aid — which the student would have received anyway — to be reduced by the amount of the scholarship.

== The English Access Microscholarship Program ==
The English Access Microscholarship Program is an international project that was created by the U.S Department of State aimed at helping teens (13–20 years-old) from economically disadvantaged backgrounds to have better opportunities in employment, education, and life in general. Access promotes skills and knowledge in the English language, as well as giving students the ability to compete and participate in future exchanges and study in the United States.

Each student receives 128 hours of instructions per year. It consists of 4 hours per week, for a total of 32 weeks, plus 72 hours of intensive two-week summer program each year. Approximately 95,000 students in more than 85 countries have participated in the Access Program since its founding in 2004.

The English Access Micro-Scholarship Program has reached out to other countries. The U.S. Embassy in Chisinau, Moldova has made available grants proposals from possible implementing partners for the 2017 – 2019 Access Program. The purpose is to provide underprivileged young students opportunities to learn English and promote leadership skills by educating them regarding American culture. This program provides two years of English lessons or minimum of 180 hours of instruction annually. In Algeria, the US Department of State launched the Program in February 2015 up to September 2018. The target is students from 13 to 20 years old from deprived sectors worldwide. World Learning will collaborate with eight schools in this country with 200 students participating in various programs for two years and receive 360 hours of instruction.

== See also ==
- List of North American scholarships
- Student financial aid in the United States
