= Embassy of the United States, Caracas =

Embassy of the United States in Caracas Embajada de los Estados Unidos en Caracas
- Location: Caracas, Venezuela
- Address: Calle F con Calle Suapure, Urb. Colinas de Valle Arriba; Caracas, Venezuela
- Chargé d'affaires: John Barrett
- Website: U.S. Embassy Venezuela

The Embassy of the United States in Caracas is located at Calle F con Calle Suapure, Urb. Colinas de Valle Arriba, Caracas, normally represents the US in United States–Venezuela relations.

The US has not had an ambassador to Venezuela since July 2010 when Patrick Duddy finished his assignment. Since July 2018, the embassy has been led by the charge d'affaires James "Jimmy" Story from the Venezuela Affairs Unit of the Embassy of the United States in Bogotá, Colombia, after President Nicolás Maduro ordered the expulsion of Todd D. Robinson in May 2018. On March 11, 2019, the Department of State announced the temporary suspension of operations of the U.S. Embassy in Caracas and the withdrawal of diplomatic personnel. The embassy closed for a long time due to diplomatic disputes between the two countries, all consular services were suspended and consular inquiries were referred to the Embassy of the United States in Bogotá, Colombia.

Diplomatic relations between the two countries were not re-established until January 2026, after then-president Maduro was captured by the US military. The embassy officially started to reopen on March 14, 2026, after seven years of closure. On March 30, 2026, the Department of State announced the resumption of operations, marking the full restoration of embassy's services.

== History ==
=== Bipartisanship ===
In 1958, shortly after the overthrow of Venezuelan dictator Marcos Pérez Jiménez, Vice President of the United States Richard Nixon's motorcade was attacked in Caracas during his 1958 goodwill tour of South America. Nixon ended up unharmed and his entourage managed to reach the U.S. embassy.

Two different accounts explain how Nixon's car was ultimately able to escape the mob and continue to the embassy. According to one version of events, the U.S. press corps' flatbed truck, accompanying the motorcade, was used to clear a path through the crowd. In Nixon's remembrance of the incident, Associated Press photographer Hank Griffin at one point had to use his camera to beat back a protester who tried to mount the truck. According to a second account, soldiers of the Venezuelan Army arrived and cleared the traffic, thereafter moving the mob back at bayonet-point to allow Nixon's car to pass.

Shortly after the Nixons arrived at the embassy, the Venezuelan army surrounded and fortified the chancellery, reinforcing the small U.S. Marine guard force. Their assistance had earlier been requested by the U.S. ambassador. That afternoon, members of the ruling junta arrived at the embassy and lunched with Nixon. The next morning, representatives of Venezuela's major labor unions came to the embassy and requested an audience with Nixon, which was granted. The union leaders apologized for events of the preceding day.

Additional activities were canceled, and Nixon departed Caracas the next morning, seven hours early. His motorcade to the airport was protected by a major deployment of Venezuelan Army infantry and armored forces in the capital. Nixon described having taken the same route as before, whose streets were empty and heavy patrolled after the whole area had been tear-gassed.

=== Hugo Chávez ===
During the presidencies of Hugo Chávez and Nicolás Maduro, relations between Venezuela and the United States deteriorated. On 11 September 2008, Ambassador Patrick Duddy left Venezuela after Chávez claimed that he was involved in an American-led initiative to remove him from office. Duddy eventually returned to his position in July 2009 but after his assignment ended in July 2010, Chávez refused a replacement for the ambassador, which would be Larry Leon Palmer.

=== Nicolás Maduro ===
On 2 March 2015, President Maduro accused the United States of plotting a coup against him and demanded that the Embassy of the United States in Caracas reduce its staff from over 200 workers to 17 individuals within two weeks. With about 232,500 applications made through the embassy in 2014, this created fears that difficulties would arise for the demand of visas by Venezuelans. Despite Maduro's orders, the staff did not change at the embassy.

In December 2017, Todd D. Robinson was appointed by President Donald Trump to be charge d'affairs en pied at the embassy in Caracas, Venezuela. In January 2018, Robinson met with Venezuelan foreign minister, Jorge Arreaza, to discuss the case of jailed American citizen Joshua Holt. On 22 May the same year, Robinson and his deputy, Brian Naranjo were expelled from the country as persona non grata by Nicolas Maduro, the newly re-elected president. Days later, Joshua Holt was freed and allowed to return to the United States.

On 23 January 2019, Maduro announced the unilateral breakdown of diplomatic relations with the United States, giving 72 hours to US diplomatic officials to leave the country. The decision came after President Donald Trump recognized Juan Guaidó as interim president of Venezuela. On 12 March 2019, Secretary of State Mike Pompeo announced over Twitter that the US would withdraw all remaining personnel from the embassy within the week, citing the increasingly deteriorating situation in the country.

On 5 April 2019, the United States signed a protecting power agreement with Switzerland to represent its interests in Venezuela, however, the agreement is not yet operational as it has not been approved by Maduro's government due to the United States rejecting Maduro's government's proposal to have Turkey as its protecting power as the United States only recognizes Guaidó as interim president. The United States established a "Venezuela Affairs Unit" section at the U.S. Embassy in Bogotá, Colombia which served as an interim diplomatic office to Venezuela.

=== Delcy Rodríguez ===
With Maduro's departure from office in January 2026, relations between the Trump administration and the acting Rodríguez administration have improved significantly. On January 22, Laura Dogu was appointed as the US Chargé d'Affaires to Venezuela and arrived in Caracas, the Venezuelan capital, on January 31.

== Works ==
Organized through the embassy, classes teaching the English language are offered at Bi-National Centers in the cities of Caracas, Maracaibo, and Mérida. Poor high school students in Venezuela are also taught English language classes and United States culture through the English Access Microscholarship Program while the Youth Ambassadors Program sends Venezuelan students in high school for three weeks of studies. The International Visitor Leadership Program allows Venezuelan professionals to visit the United States to observe their American counterparts. Due to the approval of the United States by Venezuelans, demand and popularity for such programs are very high and competitive.

The visa system of the embassy works by accepting payments and applications made in advance online. Appointments are then made after applying online, with individuals required to arrive early and wait in line to make sure they fit into their designated appointments. Visa and United States residency applications have increased in recent years.

== See also ==
- 2019 Venezuelan blackouts
- United States–Venezuela relations
- Embassy of Venezuela, Washington, D.C.
