= Fidel Vargas =

American financial executive and former mayor

Mayor of Baldwin Park
- In office 1992–1996
- Preceded by: Bette Lou Lowes
- Succeeded by: Bette Lou Lowes

Personal details
- Born: August 12, 1968 (age 56)
- Spouse: Melissa Vargas
- Children: 3
- Education: A.B. Harvard University; M.B.A. Harvard Business School

Fidel A. Vargas (born August 12, 1968) is an American financial executive and former mayor of Baldwin Park, California who is CEO of the Hispanic Scholarship Fund (HSF), a provider of scholarships and services for Latino students.

== Early life and education ==
Vargas was born in Lynwood, California, one of eight children born to immigrants from Mexico. His father was a carpenter and his mother a homemaker. In 1990, Vargas graduated with honors from Harvard University with an A.B. in social studies and after his term as mayor, received his M.B.A. from the Harvard Business School.

== Career ==
In 1992, at age 23, Vargas was elected mayor of Baldwin Park, California, defeating Bette Lowes. He was one of the youngest elected officials in the country at the time. Vargas was reelected in 1994 but did not run for reelection in 1997. He was succeeded by Bette Lou Lowes.

While mayor, he implemented a graffiti removal program; and was able to reduce crime by 35% by taking a strong anti-gang stance with horse patrols and helicopter surveillance as well as funded the expansion of the Morgan Park community center. He developed an economic investment plan which attracted several large businesses to the city, the tax revenues of which enabled the city to balance its budget which had been negative for the past decade. Vargas also implemented a first-time home buyer program; and replaced commissioners and board members to better reflect the ethnic character of the city which was at the time was 70% Hispanic, 12% white, 12% Asian, and 5% Black. His replacement of the police chief with a Hispanic officer created controversy after the officer was named over two higher-ranking white officers; the new chief resigned shortly thereafter. His efforts to replace the City Manager with an executive committee were also reversed late in his 2nd term. He was criticized by his predecessor Bette Lou Lowes for taking credit for programs discussed prior to his tenure; and for having ambitions for higher office. Vargas did not run for reelection choosing to instead attend the Harvard Business School.

Vargas was a founding partner in 2000 of Centinela Capital Partners, a New York-based private equity asset management.

Vargas was on President Bill Clinton's Advisory Council on Social Security; and was one of 12 members on President George W. Bush's Commission on Strengthening Social Security where he advocated for allocating 40% of the payroll tax to go toward a shift to private accounts. He also served on President Bush and President Barack Obama's Commission on Presidential Scholars.

In 2013, Vargas became the executive director and CEO of the Hispanic Scholarship Fund (Vargas had been a HSF Scholar during both his undergraduate and graduate studies). At the HSF, Vargas spearheaded efforts to develop algorithms to better match scholars with internships and career opportunities offered by their partners. In 2013, Vargas announced that the HSF would provide grants to Deferred Action for Childhood Arrivals (DACA) recipients.

In 2021, President Joe Biden appointed Vargas to the President's Commission on White House Fellowships. He was one of 22 members. The commission is responsible for recommending young Americans to become White House Fellows.

== Recognition ==
In 2022, he was one of the Manuel Torres honoree for the celebration of America's Hispanic Heritage.

Time magazine named Vargas as one of the Top 50 Young Leaders in the United States, Hispanic magazine named him one of the Top 30 Young Hispanics in the United States, and he was named one of the country's 100 most influential Hispanics by Hispanic Business Magazine.

== Personal life ==
Vargas is married to Melissa Vargas; they have three children.
