= Covina (disambiguation) =

Covina may refer to:

- Covina, California, a city in Los Angeles County, California, U.S.
- Covina massacre, a 2008 murder–suicide
- Covina (Metrolink station), a Metrolink commuter train station
- Covina-Valley Unified School District, a school district covering five cities in Southern California.

== See also ==
- West Covina, California, a city in Los Angeles County, California, U.S.
