= List of North American scholarships =

This is a list of notable North American Scholarship organizations.

== Notable scholarships for undergraduate study ==
- Daniel Trust Foundation
- Discus Awards
- Distinguished Young Women
- Gates Millennium Scholars Program
- Hispanic Scholarship Fund
- IITA Scholarship
- Jefferson Scholarship at the University of Virginia
- Loran Scholars Foundation for study in Canada
- Meyerhoff Scholarship Program
- Morehead-Cain Scholarship
- National Merit Scholarship Program
- New York Times College Scholarship
- Posse Foundation
- Princeton Prize in Race Relations
- Robertson Scholars Program for study at Duke University and the University of North Carolina at Chapel Hill
- Samsung Global Scholarship Program
- Science, Mathematics, And Research For Transformation (SMART) Defense Scholarship Program
- Taiwan Scholarship
- United Negro College Fund

== Notable scholarships for graduate study ==
- Chevening Scholarship
- Fulbright Program
- Gates Scholarship for study at the University of Cambridge
- Hispanic Scholarship Fund
- Kennedy Scholarship
- Marshall Scholarship for study in the United Kingdom
- Rhodes Scholarship for study at the University of Oxford
- Truman Scholarship
- World Bank Scholarship

== Other notable scholarships ==
- Commonwealth Scholarship
- Congress-Bundestag Youth Exchange
- Rotary International

== Defunct scholarships ==
- Canadian Millennium Scholarship
- George J. Mitchell Scholarship
