= Save Our State (disambiguation) =

Save Our State is a political group in Southern California.

Save Our State may also refer to:

- Save Our State (Australia), a political group in New South Wales
- 1994 California Proposition 187, called the "Save Our State" initiative
- Save Our State Amendment, a 2010 Oklahoma ballot initiative
