= Baldwin Park, California =

City in California, United States

- City
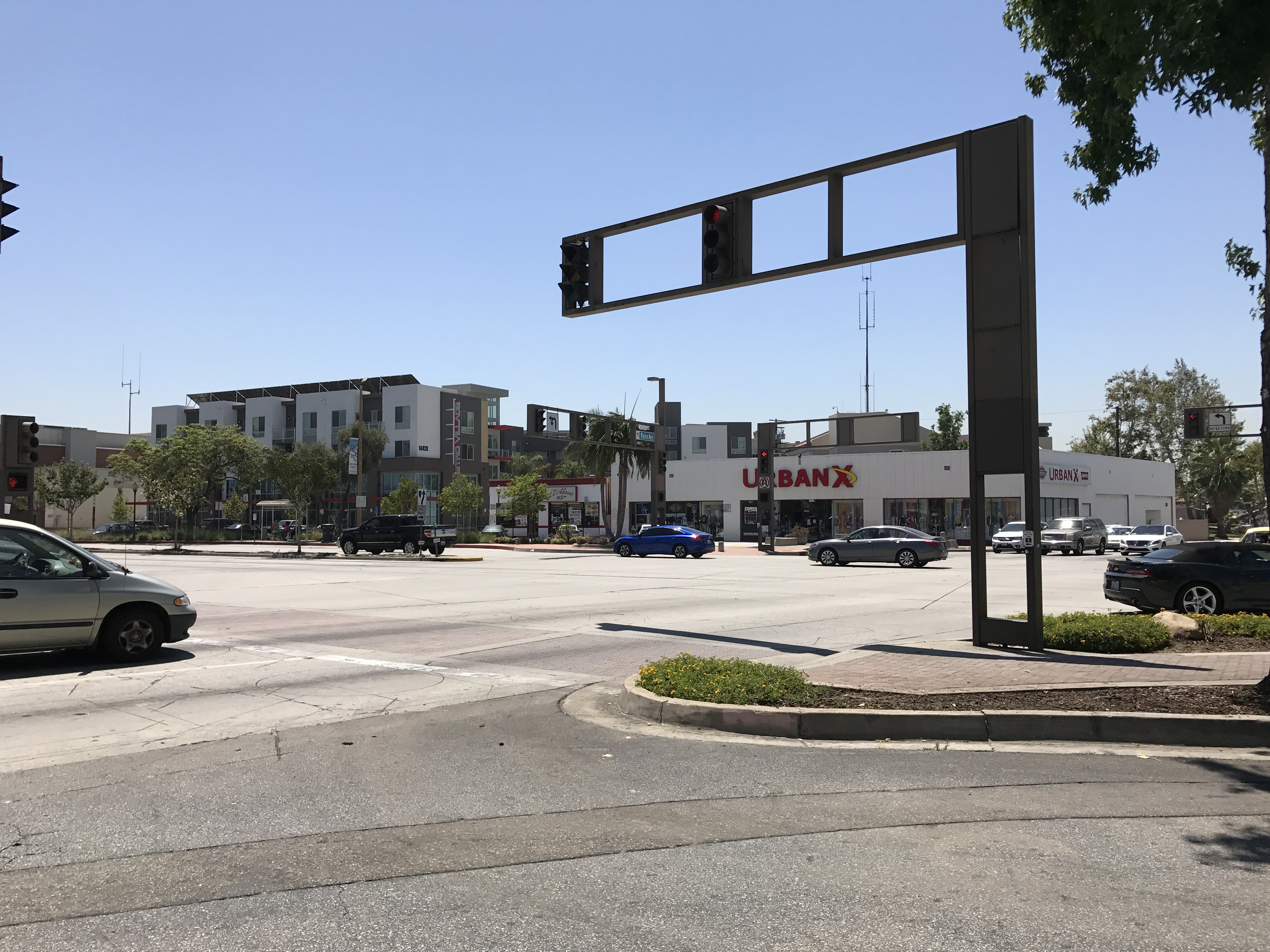
- Baldwin Park City Hall, Metro Village, Metrolink station complex

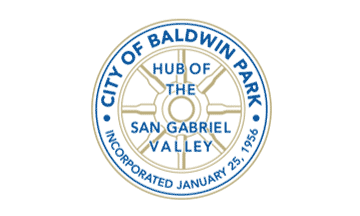
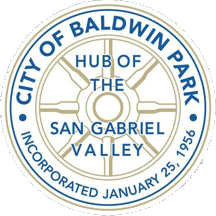
- Flag Seal
- Motto: The Hub of the San Gabriel Valley
- Interactive map of Baldwin Park, California
- Coordinates: 34°4′58″N 117°58′18″W
- Country: United States
- State: California
- County: Los Angeles
- Incorporated: January 25, 1956

Government
  - Type: Council-Manager
  - Mayor: Daniel Damian
  - Mayor Pro Tem: Jean M. Ayala
  - City Council: Emmanuel J. Estrada; Alejandra Avila; Manuel Lozano
  - City Manager: Manuel Carrillo Jr.

Area
  - Total: 6.79 sq mi (17.58 km^{2})
  - Land: 6.63 sq mi (17.18 km^{2})
  - Water: 0.15 sq mi (0.40 km^{2}) 2.28%
- Elevation: 374 ft (114 m)

Population (2020)
  - Total: 72,176
  - Density: 10,882.9/sq mi (4,201.91/km^{2})
- Time zone: UTC-8 (PST)
  - Summer (DST): UTC-7 (PDT)
- ZIP Code: 91706
- Area code: 626
- FIPS code: 06-03666
- GNIS feature IDs: 1652669, 2409777
- Website: www.baldwinpark.com

Baldwin Park is a city located in the central San Gabriel Valley region of Los Angeles County, California, United States. As of the 2020 census, the population was 72,176, down from 75,390 at the 2010 census.

== History ==
Baldwin Park began as part of cattle grazing land belonging to the San Gabriel Mission. It eventually became part of the Rancho Azusa de Dalton and the Rancho La Puente properties. The community became known as Vineland in 1860. By 1906, it changed to Baldwin Park. It was named after Elias J. "Lucky" Baldwin. In 1956, Baldwin Park became the 47th incorporated city in the State of California.

As of September 1882, the first school house was built on the southeast corner of North Maine and Los Angeles Avenues in 1884. It contained two rows of double seats, a central aisle leading to the teacher's desk, and a heating stove at the north end. Mr. Frazier was the first teacher. In April 1888, the Vineland School District was established according to county records.

The first Board of Trustees took office on July 1, 1888, and elected Miss Jessie Washburn to teach the district school that fall. The building was sold in 1890 and moved to another site for a private residence. The district built the second school in 1890 and hired two teachers, Miss Ellen Lang and Miss Venna O. Finney. The second school house was relegated to the past in 1912. It later became a private Japanese school and stood as a landmark until it caught fire on September 5, 1936, and burned to the ground. Today, the Baldwin Park Unified School District lies contiguously with the city's borders. There are 23 schools within this district. The budget is well over $100 million. Currently, the district is building new school structures to accommodate growth. The district is adopting data driven strategies to help students achieve better scores in the API tests.

In the 1950s, Vias Turkey Ranch was about one mile (1.6 km) from the now 10 Freeway just off of Frazier Avenue. This huge commercial turkey ranch was famous in the Valley for a huge outdoor aviary with a unique selection of birds. The ranch had two or three types of deer species. When the value of the land escalated, the property was sold and the Ranch moved to Apple Valley.

Popular pastimes in the 1950s included riding at the horse stables across the bridge of the San Gabriel River, which was an open sand and rock river bed, and ride one hour for the sum of $1.00, a hefty price at that time considering that the minimum wage was fifty cents an hour.

Baldwin Park is home to the first In-N-Out burger stand, opened on October 22, 1948. It was the first drive-thru in California and was replaced in November 2004 with a new building. The new In-N-Out University and company store opened in 2006 on Francisquito Avenue. Also, the company's first meatpacking plant is located down the street from the locations at the company headquarters on Hamburger Lane. In-N-Out now has a second meat processing plant in Texas to serve their Texas restaurants.

In summer 2005, Save Our State, an anti-illegal immigration group based in Ventura, launched a series of protests against the Danzas Indigenas, art at the Baldwin Park train station designed for the MTA in 1993 by artist Judy Baca. The monument bears several engraved statements whose origins are not attributed. At issue was one particular inscription--It was better before they came—that Save Our State claimed was directed against Anglo whites. According to Baca, that sentence was uttered by an Anglo white Baldwin Park resident in the 1950s; he was lamenting the influx of persons of Mexican ancestry into the San Gabriel Valley following World War II.

== Geography ==
According to the United States Census Bureau, the city has a total area of 17.6 km^{2} (6.8 mi^{2}), of which 17.2 km^{2} (6.6 mi^{2}) is land and 0.4 km^{2} (0.2 mi^{2}) (2.28%) is water.

=== Climate ===
Baldwin Park experiences mild winters and warm to hot summers. The highest recorded temperature is 118 °F (48 °C), while the coldest is 21 °F (−6 °C).

Climate data for Baldwin Park, California
| Month | Jan | Feb | Mar | Apr | May | Jun | Jul | Aug | Sep | Oct | Nov | Dec | Year |
|---|---|---|---|---|---|---|---|---|---|---|---|---|---|
| Mean daily maximum °F (°C) | 70 (21) | 71 (22) | 72 (22) | 77 (25) | 79 (26) | 84 (29) | 89 (32) | 90 (32) | 88 (31) | 83 (28) | 76 (24) | 71 (22) | 79 (26) |
| Mean daily minimum °F (°C) | 43 (6) | 45 (7) | 47 (8) | 50 (10) | 55 (13) | 59 (15) | 62 (17) | 63 (17) | 61 (16) | 55 (13) | 46 (8) | 42 (6) | 52 (11) |
Source: weather.com

== Demographics ==
Historical population
| Census | Pop. | Note | %± |
|---|---|---|---|
| 1960 | 33,951 | | — |
| 1970 | 47,285 | | 39.3% |
| 1980 | 50,554 | | 6.9% |
| 1990 | 69,330 | | 37.1% |
| 2000 | 75,837 | | 9.4% |
| 2010 | 75,390 | | −0.6% |
| 2020 | 72,176 | | −4.3% |
U.S. Decennial Census; 1860–1870 1880-1890; 1900 1910 1920; 1930 1940 1950; 1960 1970 1980; 1990 2000 2010; 2020

Baldwin Park first appeared as a city in the 1960 U.S. census as part of the East San Gabriel Valley census county division. Prior to 1960, the area was included in the unincorporated portion of the now defunct El Monte Township (1950 pop. 113,710).

=== Racial and ethnic composition ===
Baldwin Park, California – Racial and ethnic composition Note: the US Census treats Hispanic/Latino as an ethnic category. This table excludes Latinos from the racial categories and assigns them to a separate category. Hispanics/Latinos may be of any race.
| Race / Ethnicity (NH = Non-Hispanic) | Pop 1980 | Pop 1990 | Pop 2000 | Pop 2010 | Pop 2020 | % 1980 | % 1990 | % 2000 | % 2010 | % 2020 |
|---|---|---|---|---|---|---|---|---|---|---|
| White alone (NH) | 18,327 | 10,531 | 5,508 | 3,232 | 2,391 | 36.25% | 15.19% | 7.26% | 4.29% | 3.31% |
| Black or African American alone (NH) | 481 | 1,443 | 1,071 | 662 | 609 | 0.95% | 2.08% | 1.41% | 0.88% | 0.84% |
| Native American or Alaska Native alone (NH) | 301 | 246 | 224 | 91 | 92 | 0.60% | 0.35% | 0.30% | 0.12% | 0.13% |
| Asian alone (NH) | 2,046 | 7,910 | 8,703 | 10,495 | 14,590 | 4.05% | 11.41% | 11.48% | 13.92% | 20.21% |
| Native Hawaiian or Pacific Islander alone (NH) | x | x | 59 | 66 | 44 | x | x | 0.08% | 0.09% | 0.06% |
| Other race alone (NH) | 63 | 149 | 45 | 95 | 266 | 0.12% | 0.21% | 0.06% | 0.13% | 0.37% |
| Mixed race or Multiracial (NH) | x | x | 567 | 346 | 501 | x | x | 0.75% | 0.46% | 0.69% |
| Hispanic or Latino (any race) | 29,336 | 49,051 | 59,660 | 60,403 | 53,683 | 58.03% | 70.75% | 78.67% | 80.12% | 74.38% |
| Total | 50,554 | 69,330 | 75,837 | 75,390 | 72,176 | 100.00% | 100.00% | 100.00% | 100.00% | 100.00% |

=== 2020 census ===
As of the 2020 census, Baldwin Park had a population of 72,176 and a population density of 10,883.0 inhabitants per square mile (4,201.9/km^{2}). The median age was 36.0 years. 22.6% of residents were under the age of 18 and 13.4% of residents were 65 years of age or older. For every 100 females there were 97.1 males, and for every 100 females age 18 and over there were 95.2 males age 18 and over.

100.0% of residents lived in urban areas, while 0.0% lived in rural areas.

There were 17,882 households in Baldwin Park; 45.6% had children under the age of 18 living in them. Of all households, 53.4% were married-couple households, 14.9% were households with a male householder and no spouse or partner present, and 25.4% were households with a female householder and no spouse or partner present. About 9.7% of all households were made up of individuals and 4.8% had someone living alone who was 65 years of age or older.

Of the 18,201 housing units, 1.8% were vacant and 17,882 (98.2%) were occupied. Owner-occupied units numbered 10,437 (58.4% of occupied) and renter-occupied units numbered 7,445 (41.5%). Vacant units included 113 for rent, 15 rented but not occupied, 44 for sale only, 19 sold but not occupied, 15 for seasonal, recreational, or occasional use, and 113 otherwise vacant. The homeowner vacancy rate was 0.4%, and the rental vacancy rate was 1.5%.

According to the Public Law 94-171 data, the racial breakdown was 14,770 (20.5%) Asian, 11,332 (15.7%) White, 1,474 (2.0%) American Indian and Alaska Native, 742 (1.0%) Black or African American, 57 (0.1%) Native Hawaiian and Other Pacific Islander, 30,277 (41.9%) Some Other Race, and 13,524 (18.7%) two or more races.

Including all responses for people of two or more races, 15,296 (21.2% of population) were Asian alone or in combination with one or more other races, 24,086 (33.4%) were White alone or in combination with one or more other races, 2,385 (3.3%) were American Indian and Alaska Native alone or in combination, 1,124 (1.6%) were Black or African American alone or in combination, 176 (0.2%) were Native Hawaiian and Other Pacific Islander alone or in combination, and 43,184 (59.8%) were some other race alone or in combination with one or more other races.

There were 53,683 residents (74.4%) who were Hispanic or Latino of any race. Of those, 8,941 (12.4% of total population) were White alone, 133 (0.2%) were Black or African American alone, 1,382 (1.9%) were American Indian and Alaska Native alone, 180 (0.2%) were Asian alone, 13 (0.0%) were Native Hawaiian and Other Pacific Islander alone, 30,011 (41.6%) were some other race alone, and 13,023 (18.0%) were two or more races.

Racial composition as of the 2020 census
| Race | Number | Percent |
|---|---|---|
| White | 11,332 | 15.7% |
| Black or African American | 742 | 1.0% |
| American Indian and Alaska Native | 1,474 | 2.0% |
| Asian | 14,770 | 20.5% |
| Native Hawaiian and Other Pacific Islander | 57 | 0.1% |
| Some other race | 30,277 | 41.9% |
| Two or more races | 13,524 | 18.7% |
| Hispanic or Latino (of any race) | 53,683 | 74.4% |

=== 2023 estimates ===
In 2023, the US Census Bureau estimated that 43.8% of the population were foreign-born. Of all people aged 5 or older, 20.4% spoke only English at home, 60.1% spoke Spanish, 0.1% spoke other Indo-European languages, 19.2% spoke Asian or Pacific Islander languages, and 0.3% spoke other languages. Of those aged 25 or older, 68.3% were high school graduates and 14.3% had a bachelor's degree.

The median household income in 2023 was $79,087, and the per capita income was $25,886. About 11.9% of families and 13.2% of the population were below the poverty line.

=== 2010 census ===
At the 2010 census Baldwin Park had a population of 75,390. The population density was 11,110.3 inhabitants per square mile (4,289.7/km^{2}). The racial makeup of Baldwin Park was 33,119 (43.9%) White, (4.3% Non-Hispanic White), 913 (1.2%) African American, 674 (0.9%) Native American, 10,696 (14.2%) Asian, 85 (0.1%) Pacific Islander, 27,079 (35.9%) from other races, and 2,824 (3.7%) from two or more races. Hispanic or Latino of any race were 60,403 persons (80.1%).

The census reported that 74,984 people (99.5% of the population) lived in households, 88 (0.1%) lived in non-institutionalized group quarters, and 318 (0.4%) were institutionalized.

There were 17,189 households, 10,027 (58.3%) had children under the age of 18 living in them, 10,097 (58.7%) were opposite-sex married couples living together, 3,358 (19.5%) had a female householder with no husband present, 1,700 (9.9%) had a male householder with no wife present. There were 1,093 (6.4%) unmarried opposite-sex partnerships, and 103 (0.6%) same-sex married couples or partnerships. 1,474 households (8.6%) were one person and 648 (3.8%) had someone living alone who was 65 or older. The average household size was 4.36. There were 15,155 families (88.2% of households); the average family size was 4.45.

The age distribution was 22,571 people (29.9%) under the age of 18, 8,849 people (11.7%) aged 18 to 24, 21,588 people (28.6%) aged 25 to 44, 16,323 people (21.7%) aged 45 to 64, and 6,059 people (8.0%) who were 65 or older. The median age was 30.5 years. For every 100 females, there were 98.5 males. For every 100 females age 18 and over, there were 96.0 males.

There were 17,736 housing units at an average density of 2,613.8 per square mile, of the occupied units 10,353 (60.2%) were owner-occupied and 6,836 (39.8%) were rented. The homeowner vacancy rate was 1.3%; the rental vacancy rate was 3.3%. 45,844 people (60.8% of the population) lived in owner-occupied housing units and 29,140 people (38.7%) lived in rental housing units.

According to the 2010 United States census, Baldwin Park had a median household income of $51,153, with 17.5% of the population living below the federal poverty line.

=== 2000 census ===
Mexican (67.0%) and Filipino (5.4%) were the most common ancestries according to the 2000 census. Mexico (69.6%) and the Philippines (8.3%) were the most common foreign places of birth in 2000.

== Economy ==
=== Top employers ===
According to the city's 2014 Comprehensive Annual Financial Report, the top employers in the city are:

| # | Employer | # of employees |
|---|---|---|
| 1 | Baldwin Park Unified School District | 1,975 |
| 2 | Baldwin Park City Hall | 454 |
| 3 | Wal-Mart | 350 |
| 4 | Durham School Services | 301 |
| 5 | Esther Snyder Community Center | 300 |
| 6 | LA Department of Public Health | 300 |
| 7 | Los Angeles County Department of Parks | 300 |
| 8 | Morgan Park | 300 |
| 9 | Waste Management Inc. | 300 |
| 10 | Target | 200 |

== Government ==
In the California State Legislature, Baldwin Park is in the 22nd senatorial district, represented by Democrat Susan Rubio, and in the 48th Assembly district, represented by Democrat Blanca Rubio.

In the United States House of Representatives, Baldwin Park is in California's 31st congressional district, represented by Democrat Gil Cisneros.

On the Los Angeles County Board of Supervisors, Baldwin Park is represented by 1st District Supervisor Hilda Solis.

The Los Angeles County Department of Health Services operates the Monrovia Health Center in Monrovia, serving Baldwin Park.

Baldwin Park has a city police department of its own, but contracts for fire and rescue with the Los Angeles County Fire Department.

Los Angeles County Animal Care Services operates the Baldwin Park Animal Care Center in Baldwin Park.

Mayors of Baldwin Park, California

| Image | Mayor | Years | Notes |
|---|---|---|---|
| | Henry J. Littlejohn | January 1956 – April 1956 | |
| | Hub H. Bloxham | April 1956 – June 1957 | |
| | Henry J. Littlejohn (2nd term) | June 1957 – April 1958 | |
| | Lyn H. Cole | April 1958 – June 1961 | |
| | Letcher Bishop | June 1961 – April 1963 | |
| | Hub H. Bloxham (2nd term) | April 1963 – April 1964 | |
| | Charles E. Morehead | April 1964 – April 1965 | |
| | Ivory D. Crites | April 1965 – April 1966 | |
| | Joseph McCaron | April 1966 – April 1967 | |
| | Charles E. Morehead (2nd term) | April 1967 – April 1968 | |
| | Joseph McCaron (2nd term) | April 1968 – April 1971 | |
| | Adelina Gregory | April 1971 – April 1972 | |
| | Russell E. Blewett | April 1972 – April 1973 | |
| | Leo W. King | April 1973 – March 1974 | |
| | Virgil V. Hamilton | March 1974 – March 1976 | |
| | Emmit R. Waldo | March 1976 – November 1977 | Waldo was recalled on November 22, 1977 |
| | Russell E. Blewett (2nd term) | December 1977 – October 1978 | Resigned October 18, 1978 |
| | Jack B. White | November 1978 – March 1987 | In 1980, the mayor was directly elected by the people to a 2-year term. No election was held in April 1986 due to insufficient candidate filing. Recalled March 31, 1987. |
| | Leo W. King (2nd term) | July 1987 – December 1989 | Resigned December 2, 1989 |
| | Bette L. Lowes | April 1990 – April 1992 | |
| | Fidel Vargas | April 1992 – March 1997 | First Latino mayor |
| | Bette L. Lowes (2nd term) | March 1997 – March 1999 | |
| | Manuel Lozano | March 1999 – November 2020 | |
| | Emmanuel J. Estrada | November 2020 – Present | |

== Notable people ==
- Sutan Amrull (born 1974), make-up artist, drag performer
- Jairo Aquino (born 1990), soccer player
- Bernardo Flores (born 1995), pitcher for Diablos Rojos del México of the Mexican League
- Darren Hall (born 2000), cornerback for the Arizona Cardinals
- Mike Munoz (born 1965), former pitcher for Detroit Tigers and Colorado Rockies
- Lefty Gunplay (born 1996), rapper
