= Jairo Aquino =

American soccer player

Personal information
- Full name: Jairo Jose Aquino
- Date of birth: July 18, 1990 (age 36)
- Place of birth: Baldwin Park, California, United States
- Position: Midfielder

Team information
- Current team: Boca Gibraltar

Youth career
- –2008: Mountain View High School

College career
Years	Team	Apps	(Gls)
2008–20xx	Mt. San Antonio College		
20xx–20xx	Cal State LA Golden Eagles		

Senior career*
Years	Team	Apps	(Gls)
2013	OC Blues Strikers FC	8	(1)
2014	San Jose Earthquakes U23		
2016	Academia Chișinău	2	(0)
2016–2017	Nova Mama Mia		
2017–	Boca Gibraltar		
- * Club domestic league appearances and goals

Jairo Jose Aquino (born 18 July 1990 in Baldwin Park, California, United States) is an American soccer player who plays for FC Boca Juniors Gibraltar in the Gibraltar Premier Division.

== Career ==
=== Moldova ===
Added to the Academia Chișinău of the Moldovan National Division's roster in early 2016, Aquino stated that he was happy to be there and was excited for the opportunity.

=== Romania ===
Landing at CS Nuova Mama Mia Becicherecu Mic of the Romanian Liga III alongside American Heriberto Ponce Jr in late 2016, the only two foreigners on the team, the Baldwin Park native wore number 16 for the club. The transfer was arranged by US-based agent George Sangeorzan, who gave credence to their abilities. On the level of the third tier, the midfielder claimed that it was physical and hard tackling.

== Personal life ==
Majoring Kinesiology, at Cal State LA, Aquino is the son of Mauro Aquino and has Salvadoran citizenship.
