= United States–Venezuela relations =

- United States: Venezuela

Diplomatic mission
- Embassy of the United States, Caracas: Embassy of Venezuela, Washington, D.C.

Envoy
- Chargé d'Affaires John Barrett: Chargé d'Affaires Félix Plasencia

The diplomatic relationship between the United States of America and the Bolivarian Republic of Venezuela were strained during parts of the 21st century.

Relations were strong during the second half of the 20th century. This changed in 1999 when Hugo Chávez took office as president of Venezuela. Years later, Chávez declared himself socialist and anti-imperialist, in reference to being against the government of the United States. Tensions between the countries increased further after Venezuela accused the George W. Bush administration of supporting the 2002 Venezuelan coup d'état attempt against Chávez, an accusation that was partly retracted later. Relations were further strained when Venezuela expelled the U.S. ambassador in September 2008 in solidarity with Bolivia after a U.S. ambassador was accused of cooperating with violent anti-government groups in the country. Though relations thawed somewhat under President Barack Obama in 2009, they steadily deteriorated once again shortly afterwards. In February 2014, the Venezuelan government ordered three American diplomats out of the country on allegations of promoting violence.

During the 2019 Venezuelan presidential crisis, Nicolás Maduro announced that Venezuela was breaking ties with the United States, following President Donald Trump's announcement that the U.S. recognized Juan Guaidó, the president of the National Assembly, as interim president. Although the United States stopped recognizing Guaidó's presidential claim when the opposition National Assembly's vote to dissolve Guaidó's interim government took effect in 2023, the U.S. continued to recognize the National Assembly elected in the 2015 parliamentary election.

In 2025, during the second Trump administration, the United States sent Venezuelans accused of being members of Venezuelan gang Tren de Aragua to the Center for the Confinement of Terrorism (CECOT), a maximum security prison in El Salvador. That same year, the US government designated gangs such as Tren de Aragua, along with the Cartel of the Suns, as terrorist organizations. In September 2025, the United States started to carry out airstrikes against alleged drug boats as part of a military buildup in the Caribbean Sea. In January 2026, the U.S. conducted a military operation, capturing Maduro and his wife and transferring them to New York. After the ouster of Maduro, the United States and Venezuela have begun taking the first steps towards restoring relations.

== 19th century ==
During the Latin American wars of independence, the United States was officially neutral but permitted Latin American agents to obtain weapons and supplies. With the reception of Manuel Torres in 1821, the Gran Colombia (present-day Panama, Colombia, Ecuador, northern Peru, Venezuela, western Guyana and northwest Brazil) became the first former Spanish colony recognized by the United States, and the United States was the second government (after the Kingdom of Brazil) to recognize an independent Latin American state. The first diplomatic envoy from the U.S. arrived in Bogotá December 1822. The next year the Anderson–Gual Treaty became the first bilateral treaty the U.S. concluded with another American country. It established mutual most favored nation status between the countries. Following the dissolution of Gran Colombia, the United States recognized Venezuela as an independent republic. In his 1835 State of the Union, Jackson noted:

From our diplomatic agents in Brazil, Chile, Peru, Central America, Venezuela, and New Granada constant assurances are received of the continued good understanding with the Governments to which they are severally accredited.

=== Grover Cleveland Administration ===
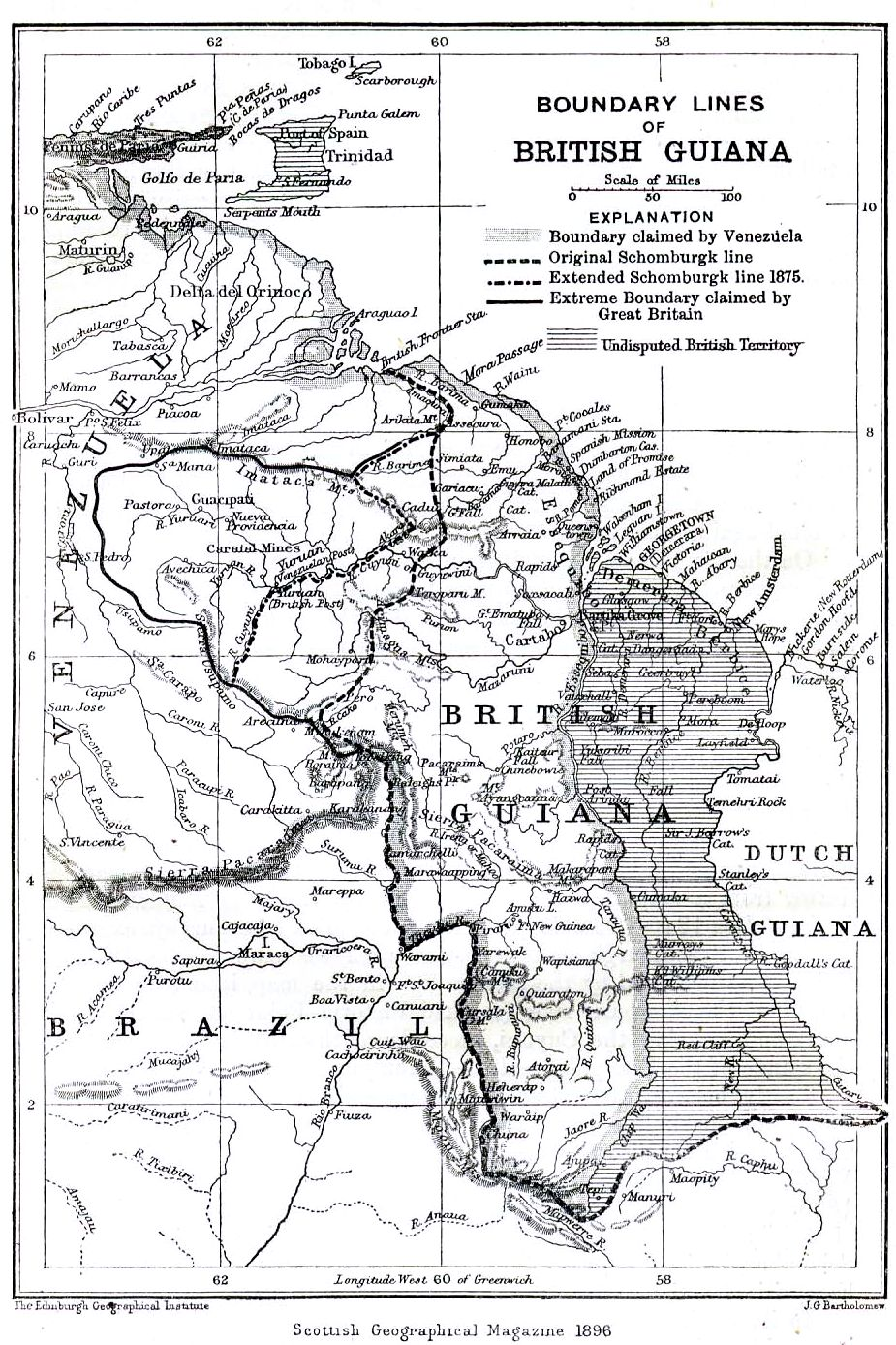
the Venezuelan boundary dispute of 1895

The Venezuelan crisis of 1895 arose from a boundary dispute between Britain and Venezuela during Cleveland's second term. Faced with the question of whether or not to enforce the Monroe Doctrine, recommending a court of arbitration to resolve the matter, Cleveland said:

The dispute has reached such a stage as to make it now incumbent upon the United States to take measures to determine with sufficient certainty for its justification what is the true divisional line between the Republic of Venezuela and British Guiana. The inquiry to that end should of course be conducted carefully and judicially, and due weight should be given to all available evidence, records, and facts in support of the claims of both parties. In order that such an examination should be prosecuted in a thorough and satisfactory manner, I suggest that the Congress make an adequate appropriation for the expenses of a commission, to be appointed by the Executive, who shall make the necessary investigation and report upon the matter with the least possible delay. When such report is made and accepted it will, in my opinion, be the duty of the United States to resist by every means in its power, as a willful aggression upon its rights and interests, the appropriation by Great Britain of any lands or the exercise of governmental jurisdiction over any territory which after investigation we have determined of right belongs to Venezuela.

== Venezuelan crisis of 1902–1903 ==
When American diplomat, Herbert Wolcott Bowen, returned to Venezuela in January 1904, he noticed Venezuela seemed more peaceful and secure. Castro would reassure Bowen that the United States and Venezuela were experiencing a strong relationship. However, after the Castro regime delayed fulfilling the agreements which ended the Venezuelan crisis of 1902–03, Bowen lost confidence. This would eventually lead to the Castro regime's economic policy angering the United States, France, and the Netherlands. This would play a crucial role in the Dutch–Venezuelan crisis of 1908.

== Marcos Pérez Jiménez dictatorship (1953–1958) ==
Dictator Marcos Pérez Jiménez overthrew the elected president, Rómulo Gallegos, and seized power in the 1948 Venezuelan coup d'état. During this prosperity, foreign investment, particularly from American oil companies, grew along with the support from the Jiménez Regime. The anti-communist regime allowed and supported the exploitation of the country's natural resources by the American oil industry, as a portion of the profits made its way from companies like Mobil and Exxon to the personal coffers of Pérez Jiménez.

Pérez Jiménez received the Legion of Merit from the U.S. government in 1954.

The Seguridad Nacional, headed by Pedro Estrada, tortured thousands of Venezuelans and disappeared several others, both in its headquarters in Caracas and in a confinement camp on Guasina Island in the jungles of the Orinoco. After the 1958 Venezuelan coup d'état, when Pérez Jiménez abandoned the government and the country on 23 January 1958, more than 400 prisoners were found in the basement of the headquarters of the Seguridad Nacional.

== Presidency of Hugo Chávez ==
=== Vargas tragedy ===
During the evacuation of survivors of the Vargas tragedy, when torrential rains and the flash floods and debris flows in the Vargas State in 2000 killed tens of thousands of people and destroyed thousands of homes, a disaster relief team from the United States headed up by New Mexico State Senator Joseph Carraro arrived with a medical team and supplies, and to provide water purification and sleeping units.

Chávez initially accepted assistance from anyone who offered, with the United States sending helicopters and dozens of soldiers that arrived two days after the disaster. When defense minister Raúl Salazar complied with the offer of the United States' further aid that included 450 Marines and naval engineers aboard the USS Tortuga, Chávez told Salazar to decline the offer since "[i]t was a matter of sovereignty". Salazar became angry and assumed that Chávez's opinion was influenced by talks with Fidel Castro, though he complied with the order. Though additional aid was necessary, Chávez thought a more revolutionary image was more important and the USS Tortuga returned to its port, according to author Rory Carroll.

=== United States interference allegations ===
In April 2002, Chávez was briefly removed from power during the 2002 Venezuelan coup attempt while an interim government led. The Guardian published a claim by Wayne Madsen alleging U.S. Navy involvement. U.S. Senator Christopher Dodd, D-CT, requested an investigation of concerns that Washington appeared to condone the removal of Chávez, which found that "U.S. officials acted appropriately and did nothing to encourage an April coup against Venezuela's president" nor did they provide any naval logistical support. CIA documents indicate that the Bush administration knew about a plot weeks before the April 2002 military coup. They cite a document dated 6 April 2002, which says: "dissident military factions...are stepping up efforts to organize a coup against President Chávez, possibly as early as this month." According to William Brownfield, ambassador to Venezuela, the U.S. embassy in Venezuela warned Chávez about a coup plot in April 2002. Further, the United States Department of State and the investigation by the Office of the Inspector General found no evidence that "U.S. assistance programs in Venezuela, including those funded by the National Endowment for Democracy (NED), were inconsistent with U.S. law or policy" or ". . . directly contributed, or was intended to contribute, to [the coup d'état]."

Chávez also claimed, during the coup's immediate aftermath, that the U.S. was still seeking his overthrow. On 6 October 2002, he stated that he had foiled a new coup plot, and on 20 October 2002, he stated that he had barely escaped an assassination attempt while returning from a trip to Europe. However, his administration failed to investigate or present conclusive evidence to that effect. During that period, the US Ambassador to Venezuela warned the Chávez administration of two potential assassination plots.

Venezuela expelled US naval commander, John Correa, in January 2006. The Venezuelan government claimed Correa, an attaché at the US embassy, had been collecting information from low-ranking Venezuelan military officers. Chávez claimed he had infiltrated the US embassy and found evidence of Correa's spying. The US declared these claims "baseless" and responded by expelling Jeny Figueredo, the chief aid to the Venezuelan ambassador, to the US. Chávez promoted Figueredo to Deputy Foreign Minister to Europe.

Chávez repeatedly alleged that the US had a plan, entitled Plan Balboa, to invade Venezuela. In an interview with Ted Koppel, Chávez stated "I have evidence that there are plans to invade Venezuela. Furthermore, we have documentation: how many bombers to overfly Venezuela on the day of the invasion, how many trans-Atlantic carriers, how many aircraft carriers..." Neither President Chávez nor officials of his administration ever presented such evidence. The US denied the allegations, saying that Plan Balboa was a military simulation carried out by Spain.

On 20 February 2005, Chávez reported that the U.S. had plans to have him assassinated; he stated that any such attempt would result in an immediate cessation of U.S.-bound Venezuelan petroleum shipments.

=== Economic relations ===
Chávez's socialist ideology and the tensions between the Venezuelan and the United States governments had little impact on economic relations between the two countries. On 15 September 2005, President Bush designated Venezuela as a country that has "failed demonstrably during the previous 12 months to adhere to their obligations under international counternarcotics agreements." However, at the same time, the President waived the economic sanctions that would normally accompany such a designation, because they would have curtailed his government's assistance for democracy programs in Venezuela. In 2006, the United States remained Venezuela's most important trading partner for both oil exports and general imports – bilateral trade expanded 36% during that year As of 2007, the U.S. imported more than $40 billion in oil from Venezuela and the trade between the countries topped $50 billion despite the tumultuous relationship between the two.

With rising oil prices and Venezuela's oil exports accounting for the bulk of trade, bilateral trade between the US and Venezuela surged, with US companies and the Venezuelan government benefiting. Nonetheless, since May 2006, the Department of State, pursuant to Section 40A of the Arms Export Control Act, has prohibited the sale of defense articles and services to Venezuela because of lack of cooperation on anti-terrorism efforts.

=== Opposition to U.S. foreign policy ===
Following the election of Hugo Chávez in 1999, relations between Venezuela and the United States deteriorated markedly, and continued to worsen after the election of George W. Bush, as Chávez became highly critical of the U.S. economic and foreign policy. Moreover, he criticized U.S. policy with regards to Iraq, Haiti, Kosovo the Free Trade Area of the Americas, and other areas. Chávez also denounced the U.S.-backed ouster of Haitian President Jean-Bertrand Aristide in February 2004. In a speech at the United Nations General Assembly, Chávez said that Bush promoted "a false democracy of the elite" and a "democracy of bombs."

Chávez's public friendship and significant trade relationship with Cuba and Fidel Castro undermined the U.S. policy of isolating Cuba; moreover, on Chávez's initiative, long-running ties between the U.S. and Venezuelan militaries were also greatly diminished.

Chávez's stance as an OPEC price hawk has also raised the price of petroleum for American consumers, as Venezuela pushed OPEC producers towards lower production ceilings, with the resultant price settling around $25 a barrel prior to 2004.

The Bush administration consistently opposed Chávez's policies. Although it did not immediately recognize the Carmona government upon its installation during the 2002 attempted coup, it speedily acknowledged the new government and seemed to hope it would last.

When a Marxist insurgency picked up speed in Colombia in the early 2000s, Chávez chose not to support the U.S. in its backing of the Colombian government. Instead, Chávez declared Venezuela to be neutral in the dispute, yet another action that irritated American officials and tensed up relations between the two nations. The border between Venezuela and Colombia was one of the most dangerous borders in Latin America at the time, because of Colombia's war spilling over to Venezuela.

Chávez dared the U.S. on 14 March 2008 to put Venezuela on a list of countries accused of supporting terrorism, calling it one more attempt to undermine him for political reasons.

During the 2008 U.S. election, Chávez declared that he had no preference between Barack Obama and John McCain stating "the two candidates for the US presidency attack us equally, they attack us defending the interests of the empire". However, at a rally the evening before the 4 November elections where Chávez was supporting his own candidates Chávez echoed a sentiment by Lula of Brazil and Morales of Bolivia, referencing the change happening in Latin America seemed to be taking place in the US. He expressed hope that he would meet with Obama as soon as possible. However, on 22 March 2009, Chávez called Obama "ignorant" and claimed Obama "has the same stench as Bush", after the US accused Venezuela of supporting the insurgent Revolutionary Armed Forces of Colombia (FARC). Chávez was offended after Obama said that he had "been a force that has interrupted progress in the region", resulting in his decision to put Venezuela's new ambassador to the United States on hold.

In January 2009, Chávez announced an investigation into the US Chargé d'Affairs, John Caulfield, who was the leading US diplomat after Duddy's expulsion. Chávez contended that Caulfield had possibly met with opposition Venezuelans in exile in Puerto Rico; an official spokeswoman from the United States said Caulfield was there for a wedding. Chávez used the occasion to accuse "the empire" of using Puerto Rico as a base for actions against him and Latin America. He referred to Puerto Rico as a "gringo colony" and stated that one day the island would be liberated.

During the Summit of the Americas on 17 April 2009, Chávez met with Obama for the first, and only, time where he expressed his wish to become Obama's friend. On 20 December 2011, Chávez called Obama "A clown, an embarrassment, and a shame to Black People" after Obama criticized Venezuela's ties with Iran and Cuba.

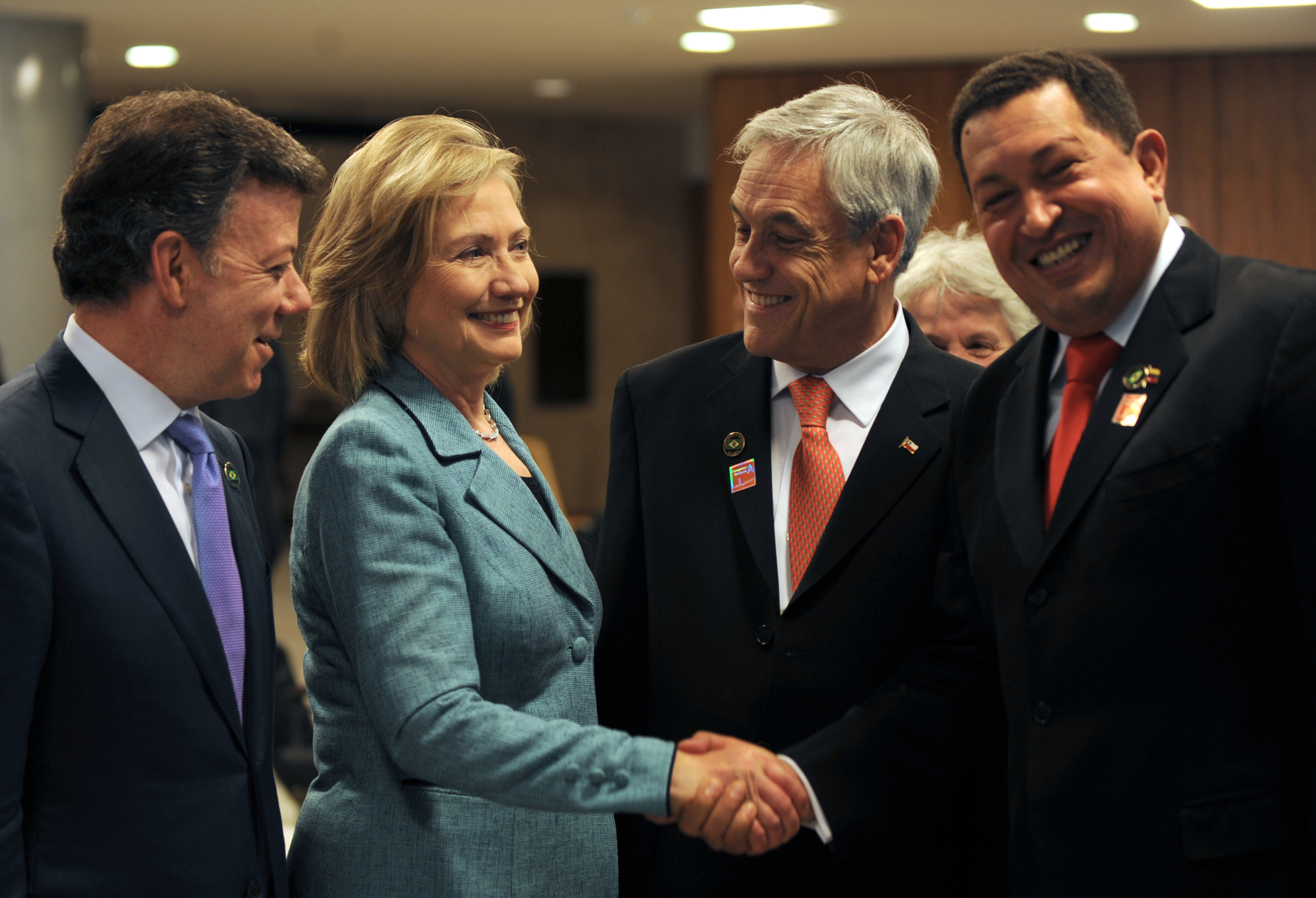
Chávez meets with Hillary Clinton on 1 January 2011, Brasília

Shortly before the 2012 US presidential elections, Chávez announced that if he could vote in the election, he would vote for Obama. In 2013, before Chávez died, Venezuelan Vice President Nicolás Maduro expelled two U.S. military attaches from the country, saying they were plotting against Venezuela by attempting to recruit Venezuelan military personnel to destabilize Venezuela and suggested they caused Chávez's cancer. The Obama administration rejected the allegations and responded by expelling two Venezuelan diplomats.

In May 2011, Venezuela was one of the few countries to condemn the killing of Osama Bin Laden. Vice President Elias Jaua said: "It surprises me to no end how natural crime and murder [have] become, how [they are] celebrated". He elaborated, stating that now the deaths, both of people working outside the law and of families of presidents (an apparent reference to Saif al-Arab Gaddafi, a target of the 2011 Libyan civil war who had been killed the day prior to bin Laden's death) "are openly celebrated by the leaders of the nations that bomb them".

=== Personal disputes ===
Chávez's anti-U.S. rhetoric sometimes touched the personal: in response to the ouster of Haitian President Jean-Bertrand Aristide in February 2004, Chávez called U.S. President George W. Bush a pendejo ("jerk" or "dumbass"); in a later speech, he made similar remarks regarding Condoleezza Rice. President Barack Obama called Chávez "a force that has interrupted progress in the region". In a 2006 speech at the UN he referred to Bush as "the Devil" while speaking at the same podium the US president had used the previous day claiming that "it still smells of sulphur". He later commented that Barack Obama "shared the same stench".

During his weekly address Aló Presidente of 18 March 2006, Chávez responded to a White House report which characterized him as a "demagogue who uses Venezuela's oil wealth to destabilize democracy in the region". During the address Chávez rhetorically called George W. Bush "a donkey." He repeated it several times adding "eres un cobarde ... eres un asesino, un genocida ... eres un borracho" (you are a coward ... you are an assassin, a mass-murderer ... you are a drunk). Chávez said Bush was "a sick man" and "an alcoholic".

=== Relations with Cuba and Iran ===
In 2000, Venezuela stepped in to bolster the Cuban crisis arising from the fall of the Soviet Union. Venezuela agreed to provide Cuba with a third of its oil needs, at a 40% discount supplemented by a subsidized loan, the value of which was estimated at $1.5-billion per year. In return, Cuba was to deliver doctors to work in Venezuela. The Venezuela assistance to the Cuban economy was estimated at between $10 billion to $13 billion annually between 2010 and 2013.

Chávez consolidated diplomatic relations with Iran, including defending its right to civilian nuclear power. Venezuela severed diplomatic relations with Israel in January 2009, "given the inhumane persecution of the Palestinian people," said the Foreign Ministry of Venezuela. Venezuela also planned to denounce Israel's military actions at the International Criminal Court, saying they "will not rest until it sees them punished," and accusing the Israeli government of 'acting as an arm of Washington'.

=== Organization of American States ===
At the 2005 meeting of the Organization of American States, a United States resolution to add a mechanism to monitor the nature of democracies was widely seen as a move to isolate Venezuela. The failure of the resolution was seen as politically significant, expressing Latin American support for Chávez.

=== Hurricane Katrina ===
After Hurricane Katrina battered the United States' Gulf coast in late 2005, the Chávez administration offered aid to the region. Chávez offered tons of food, water, and a million barrels of extra petroleum to the U.S. He has also proposed to sell, at a significant discount, as many as 66,000 barrels (10,500 m^{3}) of fuel oil to poor communities that were hit by the hurricane and offered mobile hospital units, medical specialists, and electrical generators. According to activist Jesse Jackson, the Bush administration declined the Venezuelan offer. However, United States Ambassador to Venezuela, William Brownfield welcomed the offer of fuel assistance to the region, calling it "a generous offer" and saying "when we are talking about one-to-five million dollars, that is real money. I want to recognize that and say, 'thank you.'"

In November 2005, following negotiations by leading US politicians for the US' largest fuel distributors to offer discounts to the less well-off, officials in Massachusetts signed an agreement with Venezuela. The agreement aims to provide heating oil at a 40% discount to low-income families through Citgo, a subsidiary of PDVSA and the only company to respond to the politicians' request. Chávez stated that such gestures comprise "a strong oil card to play on the geopolitical stage" and that "it is a card that we are going to play with toughness against the toughest country in the world, the United States."

== Presidency of Nicolás Maduro ==
In the wake of Chavez's death, Maduro blamed Roger Noriega and Otto Reich for an attempted assassination plot against Henrique Capriles who was running against Maduro in upcoming elections. On 1 October 2013, the US ordered three Venezuelan diplomats out of the country in response to the Venezuelan government's decision to expel three US officials from Venezuela. In 2014, 62% of Venezuelans viewed the U.S. positively. On 16 February 2014, President Nicolas Maduro ordered another three US consular officials to leave the country, accusing them of conspiring against the government and aiding opposition protests. Maduro described the US statements that claimed to be concerned with rising tensions and protests and warned against Venezuela's possible arrest of the country's opposition leader as "unacceptable" and "insolent." He said, "I don't take orders from anyone in the world." The United States responded by expelling three additional Venezuelan diplomats from the country. On 2 February 2015, the United States Department of State imposed visa restrictions on current and former Venezuelan officials that were allegedly linked to human rights abuses and political corruption. The visa restrictions also included family members, with the Department of State saying, "We are sending a clear message that human rights abusers, those who profit from public corruption, and their families are not welcome in the United States".

=== Sanctions ===
In response to the 2014 Venezuelan protests, the US Congress sought to apply economic sanctions to some Venezuelans. In December 2014, the US Venezuela Defense of Human Rights and Civil Society Act of 2014 targeted some individuals. It was extended in 2016 to expire on 31 December 2019.

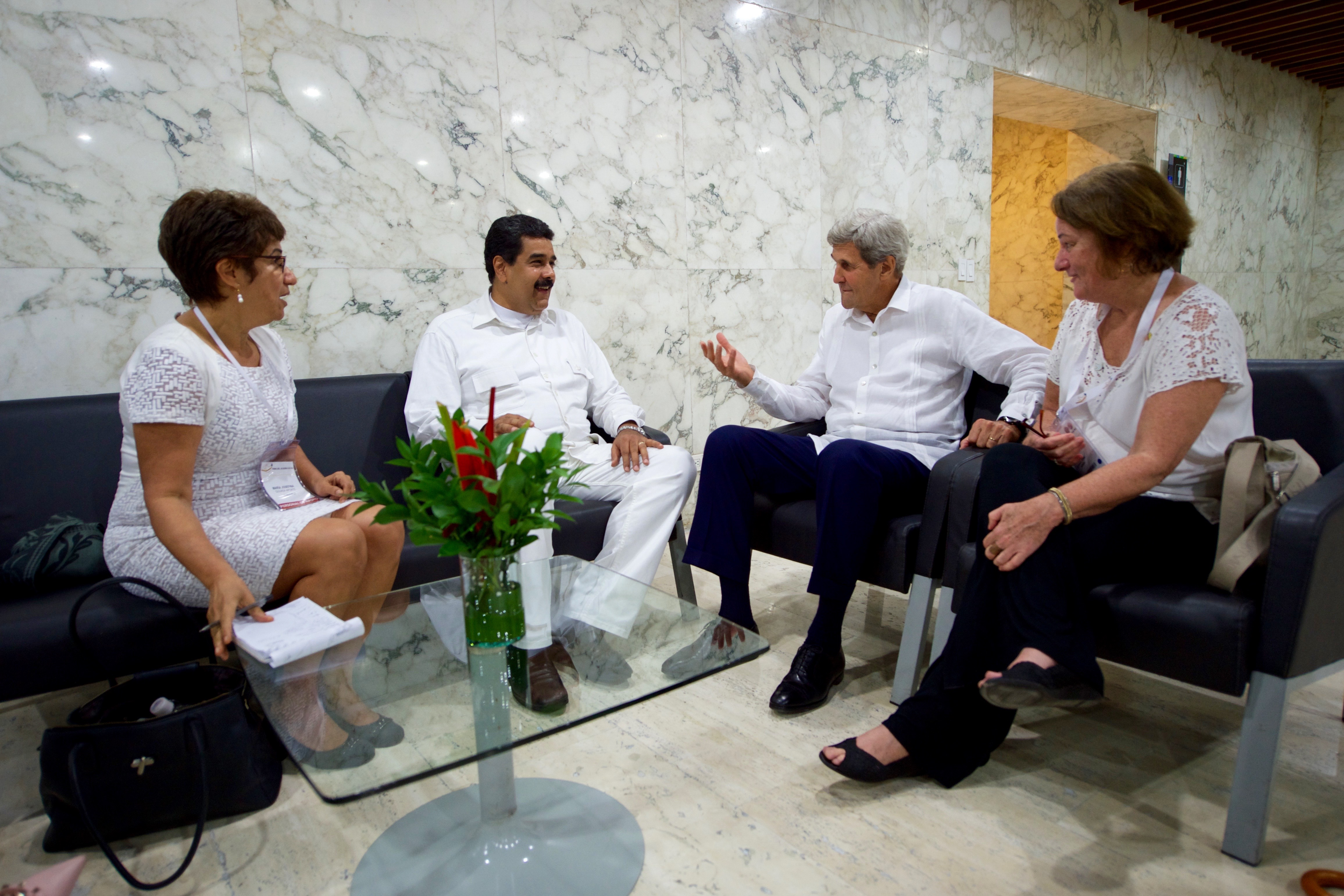
Maduro meeting with U.S. Secretary of State John Kerry on 26 September 2016

On 9 March 2015, the United States President, Barack Obama, issued a presidential order declaring Venezuela a "threat to its national security" and ordered sanctions against seven Venezuelan officials. Venezuelan President Nicolás Maduro denounced the sanctions as an attempt to topple his socialist government. Washington said that the sanctions targeted individuals who were involved in the violation of Venezuelans' human rights, saying that "we are deeply concerned by the Venezuelan government's efforts to escalate intimidation of its political opponents".

The sanctions were denounced by other Latin American countries. The Community of Latin American and Caribbean States issued a statement criticizing Washington's "unilateral coercive measures against International Law." According to academic Helen Yaffe, between 2014 and 2020, United States sanctions against Venezuela are estimated to have caused the deaths of 100,000 people due to the difficulty of importing medicine and health care equipment.

=== Beginning of Trump's first term ===
Following the election of Donald Trump as President of the United States in 2016, Citgo, a US-based oil company owned by the Venezuelan government, gifted $500,000 toward Donald Trump's inauguration on 20 January 2017.

On 20 April 2017, the Venezuelan Government seized the General Motors plant in the Venezuelan state of Zulia, causing the plant to close operations.

=== 2017 Venezuelan constitutional crisis ===
On 11 August 2017, President Trump said that he is "not going to rule out a military option" to confront the autocratic government of Nicolás Maduro and the deepening crisis in Venezuela. Venezuela's Defense Minister, Vladimir Padrino López, immediately criticized Trump for his statement, calling it "an act of supreme extremism" and "an act of madness." The Venezuelan Communications Minister, Ernesto Villegas, said Trump's words amounted to "an unprecedented threat to national sovereignty". President Maduro's son, Nicolás Maduro Guerra, stated during the 5th Constituent Assembly of Venezuela session that if the United States were to attack Venezuela, "the rifles would arrive in New York, Mr. Trump, we would arrive and take the White House." In 2017, Pew found that 47% of the Venezuelan population views the United States favorably and 35% view it unfavorably.

=== 2019 Venezuelan presidential crisis ===
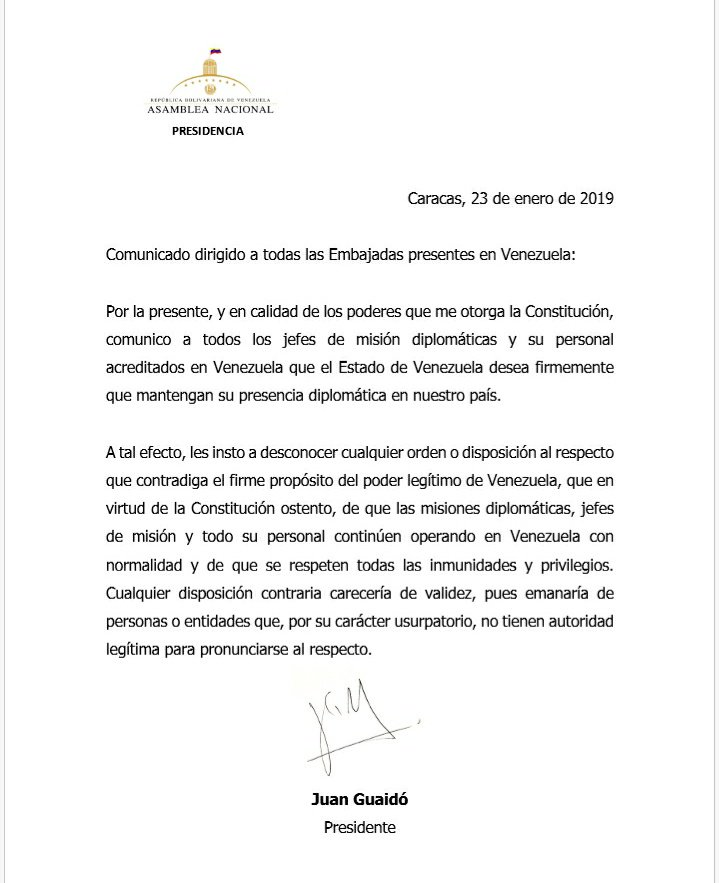
23 January 2019 communication from National Assembly to ambassadors

On 23 January 2019, Maduro announced that Venezuela was breaking ties with the United States following President Trump's announcement of recognizing Juan Guaidó, the leader of Venezuela's National Assembly, as the interim President of Venezuela. The possibility of U.S. military intervention in Venezuela was proposed by President Trump, but allies and congress members opposed the idea. Maduro said all US diplomats must leave within 72 hours, but Guaidó said that they should stay. Maduro later confirmed the closure of the Venezuelan Embassy and all consulates in the United States. In response Maduro ordered the expulsion of US diplomats, giving them 72 hours to leave Venezuela. The US said it would not close its embassy, and their diplomatic relationship was with Guaidó's government. On 26 January 2019, only hours before the deadline, the Maduro government backtracked on its expulsion order, giving US diplomats another 30 days.

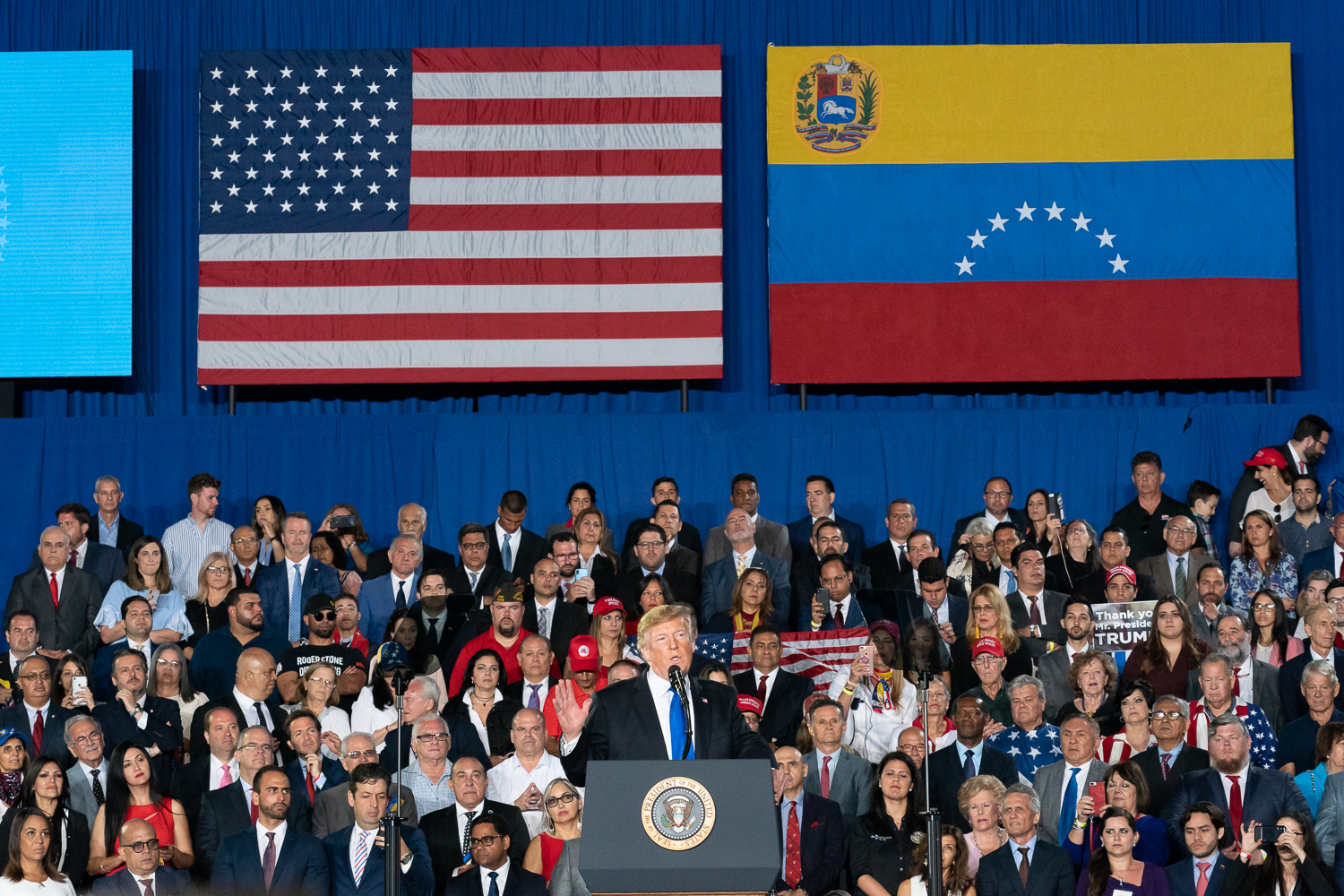
President Donald Trump warned Venezuelan soldiers to renounce loyalty to Nicolás Maduro.

The last U.S. diplomats in Caracas left Venezuela on 14 March. From the end of 2018 until March, the US revoked 340 visas from Venezuelans diplomats and others connected with Maduro. The United States established a "Venezuela Affairs Unit" section at the U.S. Embassy in Bogotá, Colombia to serve as an interim diplomatic office to Venezuela.

When the UN General Assembly voted to add Venezuela to the UN Human Rights Council in October 2019, US Ambassador to the United Nations Kelly Craft wrote: "I am personally aggrieved that 105 countries voted in favor of this affront to human life and dignity. It provides ironclad proof that the Human Rights Council is broken, and reinforces why the United States withdrew." Venezuela had been accused of withholding from the Venezuelan people humanitarian aid delivered from other nations, and of manipulating its voters in exchange for food and medical care.

In 2020, the United States stepped up pressure on Maduro. On 26 March the United States accused Maduro of narcoterrorism and offered a $15 million reward for information leading to his arrest. In response, Maduro called US President Donald Trump a "racist cowboy". A few days later, Venezuelan Attorney General Tarek William Saab summoned opposition leader Juan Guaidó for questioning for an alleged "attempted coup d'etat" and "attempted assassination". On 31 March, United States Secretary of State Mike Pompeo said that sanctions did not apply to humanitarian aid during the health emergency and that the United States would lift its sanctions if Maduro agreed to organize elections that did not include Maduro in a period of six to twelve months and reiterated U.S. support for Guaidó. Then on 1 April President Trump announced that he was sending anti-drug Navy ships and AWACS planes to the region near Venezuela in one of the largest military build-ups in the region since the 1989 invasion of Panama. In May 2020, two Americans, both former U.S. special forces soldiers were among the mercenaries captured during an unsuccessful invasion in Macuto, Venezuela.

Halliburton was forced by US sanctions to cease operations in Venezuela in December 2020.

=== Deportation protections ===
On the last full day of his presidency, 19 January 2021, Donald Trump protected 145,000 Venezuelan citizens living in the U.S. from deportation for 18 months. President Joe Biden extended temporary protected status (TPS) to Venezuelan immigrants in March 2021.

=== Rapprochement ===
In 2022, the U.S. and Venezuela had a gradual rapprochement. This involved negotiations between the US supported opposition government in exile, and the Maduro government in Mexico city. The negotiations ended with mutual agreement to facilitate the release of about $3 billion of Venezuelan state funds which had been frozen by foreign banks due to the 2019 presidential crisis. Upon release the funds were marked for humanitarian aid to Venezuelans. Rapprochement included Biden's pardon of several convicted Venezuelan narcotraffickers in exchange for Venezuela's release of the Citgo Six. Chevron was granted temporary license by the US to resume and expand its joint venture with the Venezuelan national oil company PDVSA. According to the New York Times, the US's goal was "to push Mr. Maduro toward setting free and fair conditions for the 2024 presidential election." In December 2022, the interim government dissolved. Despite the dissolution, the U.S. Government continued to recognize the 2015 National Assembly.

The rapprochement was partially spurred by the 2022 Russian invasion of Ukraine which prompted the US to drastically reduce oil imports from Russia.

=== October 2023 sanction relief ===
In October 2023, the Biden administration opted to relax sanctions on Venezuela's oil industry provisionally for six months. The decision followed the 2023 Venezuela election agreement signed in Barbados between the Venezuelan government under Nicolás Maduro and opposition factions, though pre-existing sanctions targeting the nation's gold industry were to remain in place. The agreement aimed for equitable access to both private and public media for all political candidates in the 2024 Venezuelan presidential election, as well as guarantees on freedom of movement and safety. To bolster the credibility of the electoral process, the Venezuelan government extended invitations to international electoral monitoring observers.

US Secretary of State Antony Blinken further advocated for the release of wrongfully detained US and political prisoners, and in a joint statement between the US, European Union, United Kingdom and Canada welcomed the agreement, calling it a necessary step toward the "restoration of democracy in Venezuela". Both the US and EU had previously deemed Venezuelan elections "illegitimate" and demanded a "specific timeline and process for the expedited reinstatement of all candidates".

In November 2023, following the easing of sanctions by the Biden administration, the Venezuelan government announced the resumption of talks with six multinational corporations aimed at restoring the nation's oil production. However, in early December 2023, White House National Security Council spokesperson John Kirby stated that the US was prepared to "pause" sanction relief unless the Maduro government could demonstrate renewed progress towards the release of political prisoners and US nationals detained in Venezuela.

=== Immigration and prisoner exchange ===
Relations under Trump's second presidency were marked by shifting migration trends, including waves of reverse migration. On 24 February 2025, dozens of Venezuelan migrants aimed to return home after failed attempts to enter the US under President Trump's policies to restrict asylum and end humanitarian parole programs. Migrants cited high costs, unclear repatriation options, and dangerous conditions as reasons for their return.

On 17 March 2025, the U.S. deported around 200 alleged but unidentified Venezuelan gang members. A federal judge attempted to legally block the deportations which relied on a rarely used executive power from the Alien and Sedition Acts; however, the Department of Justice stated their flights had already departed. The detainees were sent to El Salvador's Terrorism Confinement Center under an agreement with President Nayib Bukele. The move sparked criticism from rights groups and Venezuela, which accused the U.S. of criminalizing migration; the Biden administration had avoided mass deportations.

In July 2025, as part of a prisoner exchange with Venezuela, Trump secured the release of Dahud Hanid Ortíz, who was convicted of triple homicide for killing three people at a law firm in Spain in connection with a marital dispute. Marco Rubio stated that Ortíz and nine other convicts were "wrongfully detained".

=== Cartel of the Suns ===
On 25 July 2025, the U.S. Department of the Treasury designated the Cartel of the Suns as a Specially Designated Global Terrorist organization, citing Maduro's alleged leadership role within the cartel. On 7 August 2025, Attorney General Pam Bondi announced a $50 million reward for information leading to the arrest of Maduro—an increase from the previous $25 million due to the United States accusal of Maduro aiding drug cartels and street gangs and operating a corrupt and repressive regime.

=== 2025 tension and military deployment ===
==== Boat strikes ====
The United States military began executing airstrikes on vessels in the Caribbean Sea in September 2025, described by the administration of President Donald Trump as part of an effort to fight the flow of illicit drugs from Latin America to the US. In October, the strikes expanded to include vessels in the Eastern Pacific Ocean. The Trump administration has alleged, without producing public evidence, that the vessels were operated by groups it designated as narcoterrorists, including the Venezuelan organization Tren de Aragua and the Colombian far-left guerilla group National Liberation Army.

As part of what was later unveiled as Operation Southern Spear, the US began deploying Navy warships and personnel to the Caribbean in mid-August. Trump announced on 2 September that the US Navy had carried out the first airstrike in the Caribbean on a boat from Venezuela, killing all 11 people aboard; he released a video of the incident, which Venezuelan sources said had occurred on 1 September. US officials said that this was a military operation against drug cartels in Latin America and that these military operations would continue. As of 27 October 2026, at least 243 people had been killed (including 17 who are missing and presumed dead) in at least 80 strikes on over 81 vessels and the US had made its first strike on a land target within Venezuela. On 12 June, Niño Guerrero, leader of Tren de Aragua, was killed in joint operation with the post-Maduro Venezuelan government. In addition, on 6 March 2026, as part of the Ecuador conflict, the United States and Ecuadorian Armed Forces airstriked a single target allegedly belonging to FARC dissidents.

The strikes came amid tensions between the United States and Venezuela as Trump steadily increased pressure. Venezuela's Nicolás Maduro repeatedly accused the US of seeking regime change which some third-party sources agree with. Some experts, human rights groups and international bodies have said the killings are illegal under US and international law, and the Colombian and Venezuelan governments have accused the US of extrajudicial murder. In 2025 the Republican-controlled US Senate twice rejected resolutions that would limit Trump's authority to continue military action against Venezuela or airstrikes against alleged drug vessels. On 3 January 2026, Maduro was captured and flown out of the country by US forces.

==== Escalation ====
In January 2025, the United States Treasury Department imposed sanctions on eight Venezuelan economic and security officials for their role in the "suppression and subversion of democracy" led by Nicolas Maduro. Concurrently, the reward for the capture of Maduro and his ministers was increased to $25 million, and visa restrictions were implemented for his supporters.

In August 2025, Venezuelan Minister of Labor Eduardo Piñate warned of "imperialist threats" against the country, stating that "if imperialism attacks us, the working class will stand in defense of the nation". His remarks reflected the government's broader narrative portraying external hostility—particularly from the United States—as a persistent challenge to Venezuela's sovereignty. In September, Venezuela's Attorney General Tarek William Saab called on the United Nations to investigate the strikes, describing them as "crimes against humanity", as UN officials and international law experts stated the attacks were a violation of US and international law and amount to extrajudicial executions.

Maduro mobilized a militia and a military deployment within Venezuelan territory as a defense against a possible attack, and called the US actions a threat to his country's sovereignty, stating that, in the event of any attack, "the republic will declare war". He responded firmly to military threats, declaring that no threat—even one involving a thousand missiles—would compel Venezuela to back down.

In October, Trump authorized CIA covert operation in Venezuela for alleged Illegal immigration and narcotraffic.

In November 2025, Donald Trump said the likelihood of a US war with Venezuela was low, but that the days of Maduro's presidency were numbered; asked whether the US was planning a ground attack, Trump did not rule out the possibility; he said on 16 November that although the Foreign Terrorist Organization designation of Cartel of the Suns would allow it, the decision to conduct land strikes had not been made. Anonymous sources told The New York Times a phone call between Trump and Maduro occurred later in November. Unnamed sources told the Miami Herald that Trump had offered safe passage for Maduro and his immediate family, but the discussion stalled because Maduro would not agree to leave quickly, wanted "global amnesty for any crimes he and his group had committed", and wanted to retain control over Venezuela's military. Maduro rejected the offer, "demanding a 'global amnesty' for himself and allies" according to The Guardian, and stated that Venezuela doesn't want "a slave's peace".

In December 2025, the United States imposed sanctions on ten Iranian and Venezuelan individuals and entities for allegedly trading drones with Iran.

==== Seizure of oil tankers ====
In December 2025, U.S. forces seized the oil tanker Skipper in international waters off the coast of Venezuela. The vessel, which was carrying Venezuelan crude, had been subject to long-standing sanctions. According to officials, the tanker was allegedly part of a network transporting sanctioned oil from Venezuela and Iran, with suspected ties to foreign terrorist organizations.

==== 2026 capital strikes and capture of Nicolas Maduro ====
President Trump addresses the nation after authorizing airstrikes against Venezuela on January 3, 2026

On 3 January 2026, the United States launched a military strike in Venezuela and captured incumbent Venezuelan president Nicolás Maduro and his wife, Cilia Flores. The US operation, codenamed Operation Absolute Resolve, began around 2 a.m. local time, when explosions were observed. The US Armed Forces bombed infrastructure across northern Venezuela to suppress air defenses as an apprehension force attacked Maduro's compound in Caracas. Approximately 80 people, including Venezuelan and Cuban military and civilians, died and seven American soldiers were wounded. Maduro and Flores were transported to New York City by US forces and were indicted on drug trafficking charges to which Maduro and Flores pleaded not guilty.

US president Donald Trump and his administration justified the operation as a law-enforcement action with military support, saying that the president has "inherent constitutional authority" to undertake such an act. Venezuelan vice president Delcy Rodríguez denounced Maduro's "kidnapping". Venezuelan officials said at least 23 (Note: 23 soldiers killed as published in list by the military while other sources report 24. Independent Venezuelan sources indicate 42 or 43. Vladimir Padrino López said 47 without a list. See § Casualties for more reports.) Venezuelan security officers were killed during the attack. The Cuban government said that 32 members of the Cuban military and intelligence agencies were killed. Officials in the United Nations (UN), the US, and other countries, (Note: Brazil, China, Colombia, Cuba, Eritrea, Mexico, Russia, South Africa, and Spain) as well as international law experts said the raid violated the UN Charter and Venezuela's sovereignty. Other reactions around the world included celebrations by the Venezuelan diaspora and protests against the attack.

The Venezuelan government remained in place, with Rodríguez sworn in as acting president on 5 January 2026. Multiple political prisoners (including foreigners) detained in Venezuela were released, a gesture which, according to Trump, contributed to avoiding a second wave of attacks. On 30 January, Rodríguez announced an amnesty bill for political prisoners covering the period of 1999 to present, which was approved on 19 February. As of 8 March, the number of political prisoners released confirmed since 8 January was 621 out of an estimate of over 800 held before January, according to human rights organizations. By February, the US and Venezuela had restarted diplomatic relations, with the Embassy of the United States, Caracas, being reopened for the first time since 2019. Since the intervention, the US State Department under Marco Rubio has exercised control over core aspects of Venezuela's governance, including its domestic finances, government appointments, revenues, foreign policy, and the distribution of its natural resources.

Trump and his administration made clear that access to Venezuelan oil was a core reason for the action. (Note: Attributed to multiple sources:) The US announced a 50-million-barrel oil supply deal with the remaining government in Venezuela, with the first $300 million already received on 20 January. On 29 January, a new law was passed by Rodríguez to give private companies control over the production and sale of oil. In parallel, the US lifted sanctions imposed on Venezuelan oil trade and issued licenses for companies to trade Venezuelan oil. Since the attack, the Trump administration has collected more than $13 billion in proceeds from Venezuelan oil sales, without financial oversight. It has used the disbursement of oil revenue as leverage against Rodríguez's government.

== Acting presidency of Delcy Rodríguez ==
=== Renewal of diplomatic relations ===
After the announcement of the release of political prisoners by the Venezuelan government on 8 January, the US and Venezuela began discussions to restart diplomatic relations, including the possibility of reopening the United States embassy in Caracas which was closed in 2019. US officials visited Caracas and on 10 January, the US State Department published a security alert urging its citizens to leave Venezuela immediately due to the presence of colectivos (pro-government paramilitary groups) targeting US citizens.

Donald Trump announced on 14 January that he had talked by phone with acting president of Venezuela Delcy Rodríguez on oil, trade and national security. The call was confirmed by Rodríguez, who qualified the phone call as positive. Rodríguez also announced to have sent envoys to meet with United States officials the next day.

On 15 January, Central Intelligence Agency (CIA) director John Ratcliffe met with Delcy Rodríguez in Caracas to discuss cooperation and economic stability. According to a US official "The director made clear Venezuela can no longer provide support to drug traffickers like TDA" (referring to the criminal organization Tren de Aragua).

After a discussion with Delcy Rodríguez on 29 January, Trump announced the re-opening of Venezuelan airspace.

US diplomat Laura Farnsworth Dogu was appointed chargé d'affaires for Venezuela on 22 January, and arrived to Venezuela on 30 January. On 2 February, she met in Miraflores Palace with Delcy and Jorge Rodríguez to establish "the work agenda between the Bolivarian Republic of Venezuela and the United States." After the meeting, the US embassy shared on social media that Dogu met with the Venezuelan administration to "reiterate the three phases that US Secretary of State Marco Rubio had outlined for Venezuela: stabilization, economic recovery and reconciliation, and transition." Felix Plasencia was named as diplomatic representative of Venezuela to the United States.

United States Energy Secretary Chris Wright arrived to Caracas on 11 February to make an assessment on Venezuela's oil industry. He met with Delcy Rodríguez in the presidential palace. Days before, Wright said he was expecting to "visit some of the nation's oil fields to see firsthand how President Trump's historic US-Venezuela Energy Deal is unleashing peace and prosperity." According to the Venezuelan information minister, they discussed a bilateral energy agenda. The last US Energy Secretary that visited Venezuela before that was Bill Richardson in 2001 under US president Bill Clinton.

Dogu and Plasencia received a US shipment of six metric tons of medicine and medical supplies that arrived in Venezuela on 13 February. Dogu indicated it was "the first of many donations" that will arrive "in the coming days". Plasencia said that it was a "message of cooperation among two sovereign countries."

When asked by reporters on 13 February, Trump said that he was "going to make a visit to Venezuela" but did not provide more details. On 19 February, the chief of the United States Southern Command, General Francis L. Donovan, and senior Pentagon official Joseph Humire met with Delcy Rodríguez, Venezuelan defense minister Vladimir Padrino López and interior minister Diosdado Cabello in Caracas to discuss security.

US Interior Secretary Doug Burgum visited Venezuela and met with Delcy Rodríguez on 4 March. They discussed the supply chains for critical minerals in Venezuela. On 5 March, the US State Department and Venezuelan authorities agreed to re-establish diplomatic and consular relations.

On 12 March, the United States declared in court that they recognized Delcy Rodríguez as the sole head of state of Venezuela. Two days later, the flag of the United States was raised for the first time in seven years at the Embassy of the United States, Caracas. On 30 March, the United States reopened its embassy in Venezuela, meaning resumption of US diplomatic operations in Venezuela.

On 30 April, direct commercial flights between the United States and Venezuela were resumed after a seven-year suspension.

On 22 September, President Donald Trump met with Venezuela's interim President Delcy Rodriguez in the opening of the 81st session of the UN General Assembly in New York.

== Documents ==
Key documents and milestones in U.S.–Venezuela diplomatic history
Date	Document / Milestone	Description	Primary Source Link
February 28, 1835	Formal Recognition of Venezuela	The United States officially recognizes Venezuela as an independent nation following its separation from Gran Colombia.	U.S. Embassy in Venezuela - Policy & History
January 20, 1836	Treaty of Peace, Friendship, Navigation, and Commerce	The first official bilateral commercial treaty signed between the two nations.	Wikisource - Statutes at Large Volume 18
July 20, 1895	The Olney Corollary (Venezuelan Boundary Dispute)	Secretary of State Richard Olney sends a diplomatic note to Britain invoking the Monroe Doctrine to mandate arbitration over the British Guiana border dispute.	U.S. Department of State - Office of the Historian
February 2, 1897	Treaty of Arbitration Between Venezuela and Great Britain	Brokered heavily by U.S. diplomatic pressure, forcing a formal boundary tribunal.	HathiTrust / State Dept.
January 19, 1922	Treaty of Extradition	A formal bilateral agreement establishing legal extradition guidelines between Washington and Caracas.	Foreign Relations of the United States (FRUS), 1922
November 6, 1939	Reciprocal Trade Agreement	A major commercial milestone solidifying oil and consumer good trade paths prior to World War II.	Foreign Relations of the United States (FRUS), 1939
March 18, 1942	Lend-Lease Agreement	An exclusive agreement granting the U.S. purchasing rights to exportable rubber and providing defense resources during WWII.	Foreign Relations of the United States (FRUS), 1942
February 19, 1963	Kennedy–Betancourt Memorandum of Conversation	Confidential diplomatic records detailing Cold War collaboration against Cuban regional subversion and petroleum management.	Foreign Relations of the United States (FRUS), 1961–1963
January 1, 1976	Hydrocarbons Nationalization Law	Venezuela formalizes the nationalization of its oil industry, creating PDVSA. This ends decades of U.S. oil concessions, forcing American companies like Exxon and Chevron into new legal frameworks or out of the country.	Foreign Relations of the United States (FRUS), 1969–1976
January 23, 2019	Recognition of Juan Guaidó as Interim President	The U.S. officially recognizes National Assembly President Juan Guaidó as Venezuela's legitimate leader, resulting in the Maduro administration severing formal diplomatic relations with Washington.	Trump White House Archives / State Dept.
January 3, 2026	U.S. Military Operation & Removal of Nicolás Maduro	A major U.S. intervention captures President Nicolás Maduro to face U.S. charges. Vice President Delcy Rodríguez is placed as acting president under a U.S. "regime management" and stabilization framework.	Congressional Research Service (CRS) - IN12637
January 20, 2026	Executive Order 14373 & Sanctions Restructuring	President Trump issues an executive order shielding seized Venezuelan oil revenues into a special U.S. Treasury mechanism, carving out sanctions exemptions to allow immediate private and public oil transactions.	Federal Register - EO 14373
August 31, 2026	The Historic Binational Oil Agreement	Signed by Secretary of State Marco Rubio, this deal grants the U.S. majority control of 17 oil fields holding over 65 billion barrels of proven reserves via private consortium partnerships to secure long-term energy dominance.	White House Fact Sheet / CRS Report
September 2, 2026	U.S.–Venezuela Commercial Energy Pacts	Energy Secretary Wright travels to Caracas to formalize expansive energy agreements with Chevron, Eni, and GE Vernova to open oil production and rebuild Venezuela's electric grid.	U.S. Embassy / USNI Policy Report

== See also ==
- Foreign relations of the United States
- Foreign relations of Venezuela
- Embassy of the United States, Caracas
- Embassy of Venezuela, Washington, D.C.
- Ambassadors of the United States to Venezuela
- United States–Venezuela Maritime Boundary Treaty
- Latin America–United States relations

== Sources ==
- Robertson, William Spence (September 1915). "The First Legations of the United States in Latin America". Mississippi Valley Historical Review. 2 (2): 183–212. doi:10.2307/1887061. hdl:2027/uc2.ark:/13960/t79s1m699. JSTOR 1887061.
