= Gates Millennium Scholars Program =

American scholarship

The Gates Millennium Scholars (GMS) Program is an academic scholarship award and program for higher education, available to high-achieving ethnic minority students in the United States. It was established in 1999 and funded by Microsoft founder Bill Gates through the Bill & Melinda Gates Foundation. Gates Millennium Scholars are provided with a full financial scholarship to attend any U.S. college or university, and are provided with leadership development opportunities, mentoring, as well as academic, financial and social support.

== Background ==
The scholarship was started in 1999 as a result of a $1 billion grant from Microsoft founder Bill Gates. The program is currently administered by the United Negro College Fund and partner organizations including the Hispanic Scholarship Fund, APIA Scholars (formerly known as the Asian & Pacific Islander American Scholarship Fund), and Native Forward (formerly known as the American Indian Graduate Center). Since its inception, the scholarship has paid for more than 20,000 students to attend colleges and universities, and has awarded more than $614 million for education costs including tuition, fees, books and housing. There exist a total of 20,000 scholars as of the last cohort in the class of 2016. This was the original goal of the Foundation when starting this scholarship in 2000, ending in 2016.

"It is critical to America's future that we draw from the full range of talent and ability to develop the next generation of leaders," said Gates, co-founder of the Bill & Melinda Gates Foundation. "The Millennium Scholars program is intended to ensure that we build a stronger America through improved educational opportunities."

== Goals ==
In establishing the scholarship, Gates Millennium Scholars, The Bill and Melinda Gates Foundation hoped to create a network of future leaders from around the world who would bring new vision and commitment to improving the life circumstances of citizens in their respective countries. Over time, it is anticipated that Gates Scholars will become leaders in all their respective fields, and will help to address global problems related to health, equity, technology, and learning - all areas in which the Foundation is deeply engaged.

== Selection ==
To meet the minimum qualifications for the scholarship award, applicants must be high school seniors with at least a cumulative 3.3 grade point average (GPA) on a 4.0 scale, eligible for the Federal Pell Grant, and plan to enroll full-time at an accredited U.S. college or university. Additionally, applicants must be a citizen, national or legal permanent resident of the United States, and be of African American, American Indian/Alaska Native, Asian-Pacific Islander or Hispanic American heritage. Ideally, applicants should be able to provide strong examples of personal success and growth (emotional maturity, motivation, preservation, etc.) and demonstrate outstanding leadership abilities.

The scholarship program is highly competitive with only 1,000 students selected out of over 50,000 applicants. GMS scholars who choose to pursue graduate studies in the areas of education, engineering, library science, mathematics, public health and science are eligible to receive continued funding.
