= Baldwin Park station =

Commuter rail station

Baldwin Park
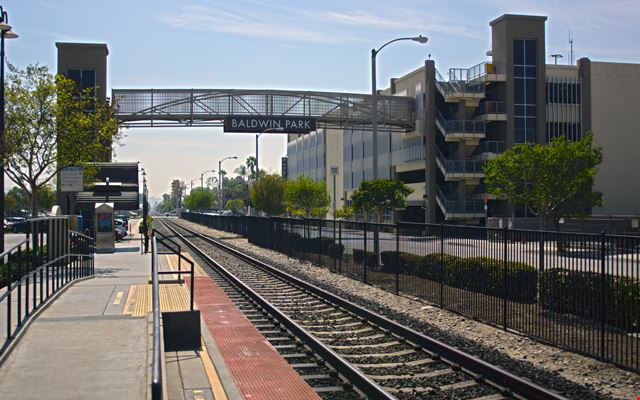
- Baldwin Park station platform

General information
- Location: 3825 Downing Avenue; Baldwin Park, California; United States
- Coordinates: 34.0865°N 117.9574°W
- Owner: City of Baldwin Park
- Line: SCRRA San Gabriel Subdivision
- Platforms: 1 side platform
- Tracks: 1
- Connections: Foothill Transit: 178, 190; Baldwin Park Transit: Express, Teal, Pumpkin

Construction
- Parking: 360 paid spaces, 14 accessible spaces
- Accessible: Yes

History
- Opened: May 24, 1993

Passengers
- FY 2026: 216 (avg. wkdy boardings)

Services
Preceding station	Metrolink	Following station
El Monte toward L.A. Union Station	San Bernardino Line	Covina toward San Bernardino or Redlands
Location

Baldwin Park station is a Metrolink train station in Baldwin Park, California, United States, between Pacific Avenue and Ramona Boulevard next to Baldwin Park City Hall. The station is owned by the City of Baldwin Park.

Baldwin Park station is served by 32 Metrolink San Bernardino Line trains (16 in each direction) on weekdays, between 4:53 a.m. and 10:18 p.m. Weekend train service is less: 16 trains (8 in each direction) on Saturdays and Sundays between 7:44 a.m. and 10:10 p.m.

== Station artwork ==
Danza Indigenas is outdoor artwork at the station by Chicana artist Judy Baca which includes a concrete footpath that represents ceremonial steps performed by early California inhabitants, the Gabrielino and Chumash Indians. The monument bears several engraved statements whose origins are not attributed. In mid-2005, "Save Our State", an anti-illegal immigration group based in Ventura County, launched a series of protests over an inscription – It was better before they came – that Save Our State claimed was directed against whites. According to Baca, that sentence was uttered by a white Baldwin Park politician in the 1950s; he was lamenting the influx of persons of Mexican ancestry into the San Gabriel Valley following World War II. The protests drew counter-protesters, and required city expenditure on crowd control and riot police, an admitted goal of Save Our State.
