= Embassy of Venezuela, Washington, D.C. =

Diplomatic mission of Venezuela to the United States

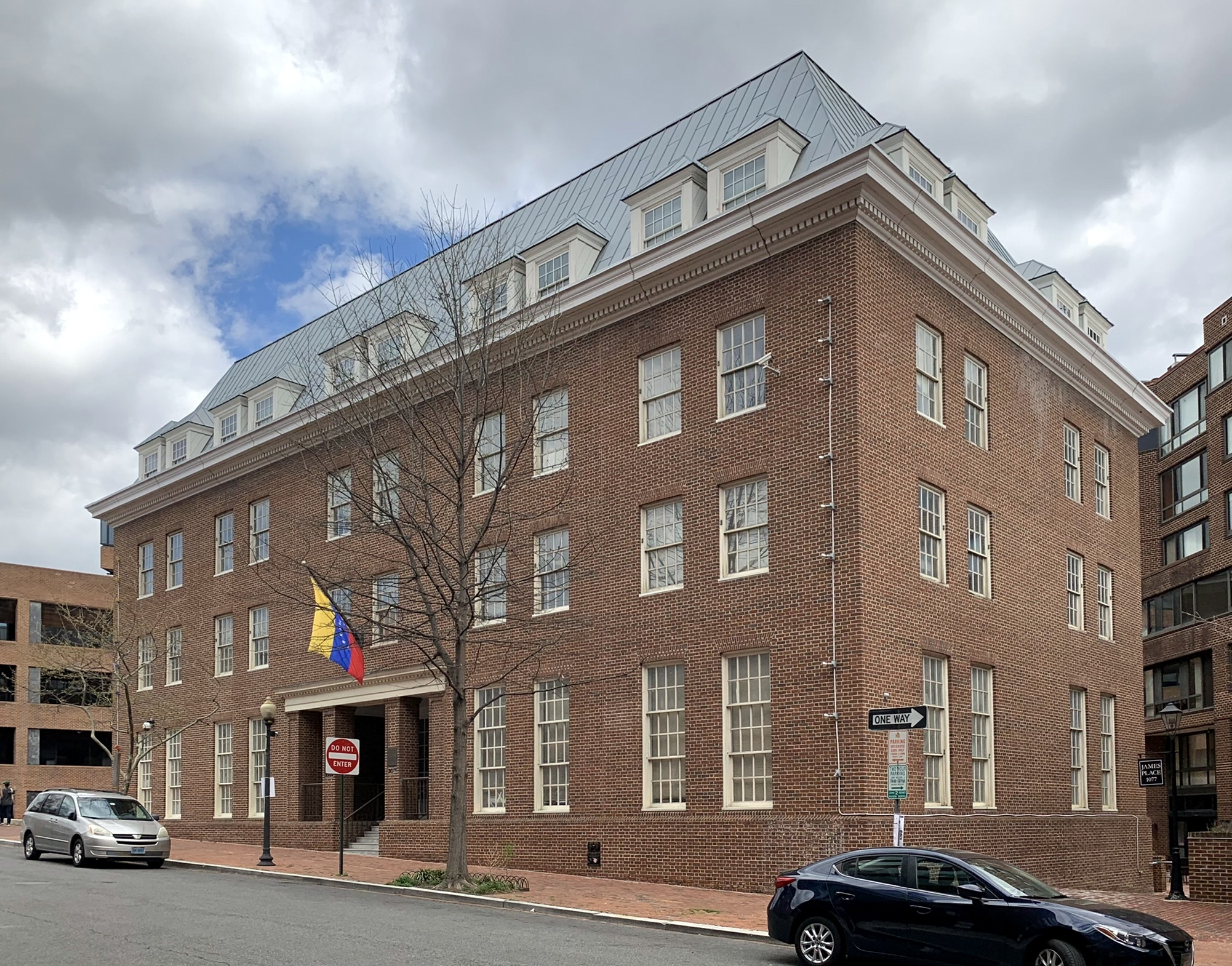
- Former Embassy of Venezuela in 2022
- Location: Washington, D.C.
- Address: 1099 30th Street, N.W.
- Coordinates: 38°54′13″N 77°3′31″W
- Chargé d'affaires: Felix Plasencia

The Embassy of Venezuela in Washington, D.C. is the soon-to-be-reopened diplomatic mission of Venezuela to the United States. The embassy is located at 1099 30th Street, Northwest, Washington, D.C. in the Georgetown neighborhood.

On January 23, 2019, the Nicolás Maduro-led government of Venezuela broke off diplomatic relations with the United States. From 2019 to January 2023, Venezuelan embassies and consulates in the US were administered by representatives of Juan Guaidó, who was recognized by the US as the acting president of Venezuela during the Venezuelan presidential crisis. In January 2023, the embassy and all Venezuelan consulates in the United States were closed after the ouster of Guaidó. Starting in early 2026, as relations between the two countries gradually normalize, the embassy is expected to reopen. (Note: As part of the 2019 Venezuelan presidential crisis, the US recognized Carlos Vecchio as Venezuela's ambassador from 2019 to 2022. The Venezuelan government led by Nicolás Maduro has not had an ambassador in the US since 2019. However, following his capture by US forces on January 3, 2026, the succeeding Delcy Rodríguez-led government gradually restored diplomatic relations with the United States.)

The embassy operated Consulates-General in Boston, Chicago, New York City, San Francisco, Houston, Miami, and New Orleans.

== Venezuelan presidential crisis ==
On January 24, 2019, Nicolás Maduro ordered the closure of both the embassy and all Venezuelan consulates in the United States. This move came as a response to US recognition of Juan Guaidó as interim president.

On January 29, 2019, Juan Guaidó appointed Carlos Vecchio to serve as Venezuelan ambassador to the United States. This move was recognized by US Secretary of State Mike Pompeo.

=== Occupation by Code Pink ===
On April 10, 2019, members of Code Pink and other left-wing organizations began occupying the embassy at the invitation of the Maduro government. As of May 1, fifty Americans supporting Maduro were living in the building, whose entrance was locked down by its occupants. As a response, hundreds of supporters of Guaidó, mostly Venezuelan nationals, assembled outside the embassy in protest, mocking the mostly American occupants for not speaking Spanish and calling them thieves and trespassers. The standoff resulted in clashes between the groups. According to the embassy occupants, the protesters prevented people from bringing in food. The occupants held signs outside the embassy saying, "Hands Off Venezuela!" and "No to U.S. coup plots", while protesters chanted "Guaidó" and "Hands off my embassy". On May 8, the power company shut off electricity to the embassy, and on May 11, running water was also cut off. On May 13, after staying for over a month in the embassy, authorities served an eviction notice on its occupants, asking them to leave immediately. Gustavo Tarre, Venezuela's representative to the Organization of American States, declared to The Associated Press that at the time there were seven people in the building, three of whom left after the notice was served. On May 16, the four protesters remaining, Kevin Zeese, Margaret Flowers, Adrienne Pine and David Paul, were forcibly removed from the embassy by police. Journalist Max Blumenthal, who has good relations with Nicolás Maduro, was arrested in October 2019 and charged with assaulting a woman during the occupation of the embassy. The charges were later dropped.

During the 2019 Foro de Sao Paulo, Maduro honored Code Pink for their actions. He posed for pictures with the group and rewarded them with gifts, including a book on Simón Bolívar and a replica of Bolivar's sword.

=== Missing paintings ===
United States Department of the Treasury in collaboration with the Federal Bureau of Investigation (FBI) and Italian Carabinieri opened an investigation into missing pieces of European and Latin American artwork that could not be found when Guaidó's representative moved into the embassy in May 2019, believing they were being discreetly plundered by Venezuelan authorities. The paintings, including a landscape of Caracas by Manuel Cabré, the portrait of "Juanita" by Armando Reverón, and a social realism piece by Héctor Poleo, were exhibited at the Inter-American Development Bank in Washington in 2008. The estimated value of the paintings was $1 million. The last known sighting of the paintings was in a photo taken in the Venezuelan embassy in 2012.

=== Consular services ===
Carlos Vecchio declared that Maduro's administration, and his predecessor Hugo Chávez, had denied consular services for Venezuelans in the United States for more than 10 years. Director of Consultar Affairs, Brian Fincheltub, announced that the embassy would progressively reactivate said services.

On May 28, Vecchio announced the creation of the Unique Consular Registry, which allows Venezuelan citizens in the United States to access to its services network. Gustavo Marcano, Counselor Minister of the embassy, explained that in the first phase of the Consular Registry an official census of Venezuelan residents would be carried out, to determined in which states and cities they are distributed in to inform about their current situation and the consular needs to the embassy. Marcano would later state that 70% of the citizens in the Registry expressed that their main necessity was the passport extension.

Juan Guaidó announced the extension of the validity of expired Venezuelan passports for five years since their expiration date. On June 7, 2019, the United States State Department announced the recognition of this extension for the emission of visas and other consular processes; the department also announced that the United States Border Patrol would also accept these passports. In a press conference, Vecchio explained that Venezuelans would be able to enter the United States with expired passports, request visas or use them as a valid identification document for procedures such as the driver's license.

In 2020, the embassy of Venezuela announced that starting from February 19, Venezuelan residents would be able to request No Objection Letters for permanence requests for studies or work, a process would be carried out by Guaidó's diplomatic mission and the US State Department. The director of Consular Affairs, Brian Fincheltub, announced that the embassy would activate the process and emission of said documents, without costs. The document allows foreigners in the United States to extend their stay period originally authorized in the visa.

== See also ==
- United States – Venezuela relations
