= Covina station =

Commuter rail station in California, U.S.

Covina
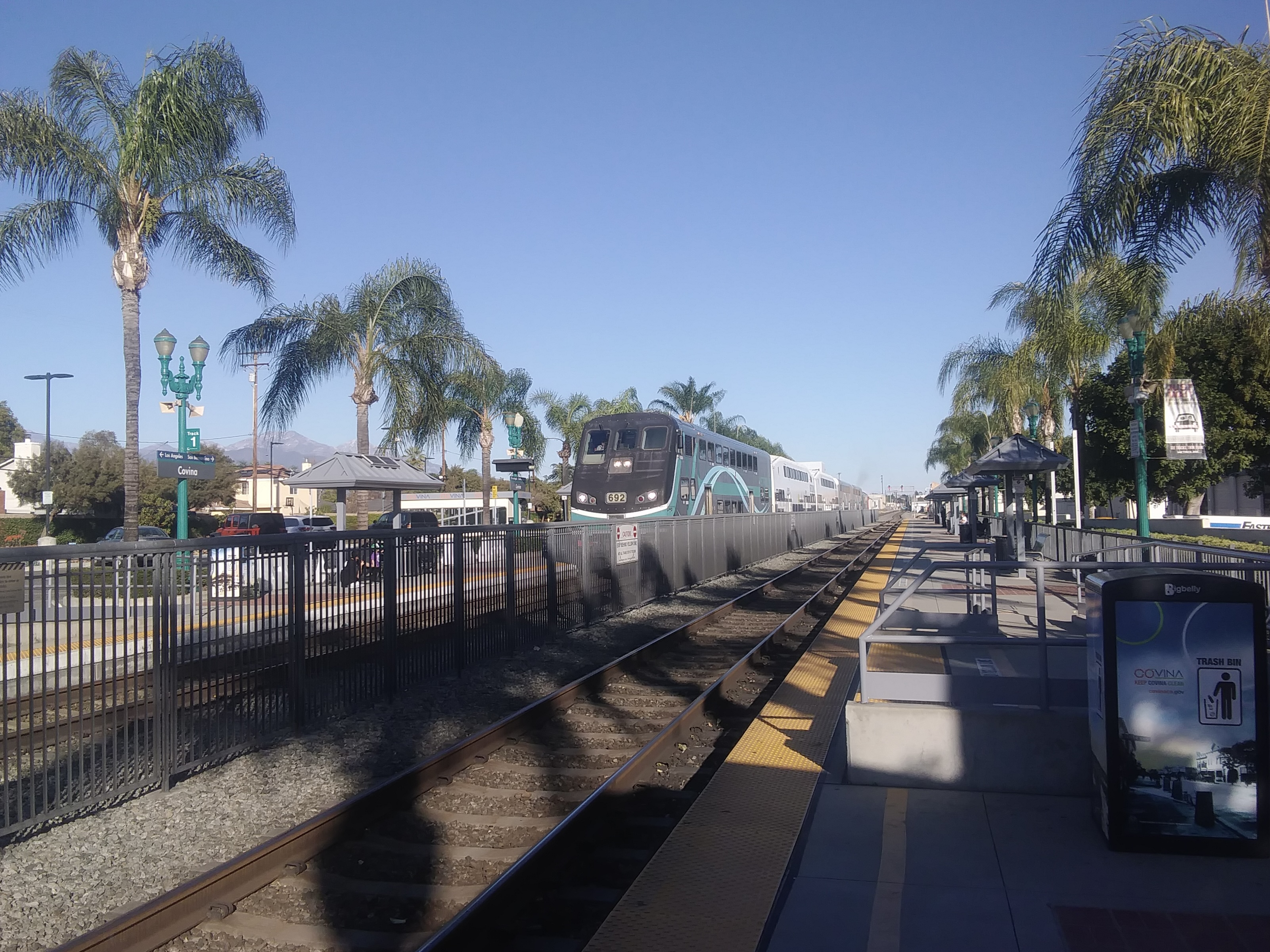
- Covina station from the east end of the platform looking west

General information
- Location: 600 North Citrus Avenue; Covina, California; United States
- Coordinates: 34°05′32″N 117°53′19″W
- Owner: City of Covina
- Line: SCRRA San Gabriel Subdivision
- Platforms: 2 side platforms
- Tracks: 2
- Connections: Foothill Transit: 281; Glendora Metrolink Shuttle

Construction
- Parking: Yes, paid
- Cycle facilities: Parking station
- Accessible: Yes

History
- Opened: October 26, 1992

Passengers
- FY 2026: 342 (avg. wkdy boardings)

Services
Preceding station	Metrolink	Following station
Baldwin Park toward L.A. Union Station	San Bernardino Line	Pomona–North toward San Bernardino or Redlands
Baldwin Park toward L.A. Union Station	San Bernardino Line	Fairplex (fair days) toward San Bernardino or Redlands
Former services
Preceding station	Southern Pacific Railroad	Following station
Irwindale toward Los Angeles	Sunset Route	Charter Oak toward New Orleans
Location

Covina station is a Metrolink train station located at 600 North Citrus Avenue in Covina, California. It is located just east of Citrus Avenue between Front Street and Edna Place.

The Covina station is served by 32 Metrolink San Bernardino Line trains (16 in each direction) on weekdays, between 4:47 a.m. and 10:25 p.m. Weekend train services is less: 16 trains (8 in each direction) on Saturdays and Sundays between 7:37 a.m. and 10:17 p.m.

The station is owned by the City of Covina. It is one of the few Metrolink stations that charges for parking (on weekdays only, for parking is free on the weekends). The small lot near the platforms requires a monthly permit. The parking structure across Citrus Avenue has lower monthly rates and allows daily parking. There is a discount for Covina residents purchasing monthly parking permits.

== History ==
Southern Pacific built a branch to Covina which was opened to passengers on August 30, 1895. The original Covina station was a boxcar, but a depot was soon built between First and Second Streets. The station proved valuable as a freight depot as it was in the vicinity of several fruit packers.

The new Metrolink station opened with the service on October 26, 1992.
