= The English Access Microscholarship Program =

US government program

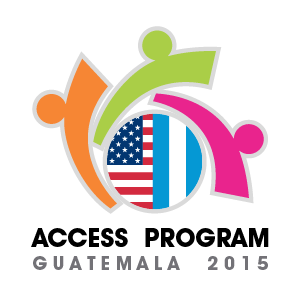

The English Access Microscholarship Program is an international project created by the U.S Department of State which aims to help teens (13–20 years-old) from economically disadvantaged backgrounds gain opportunities in employment, education, and life in general. Access promotes skills and knowledge in the English language, as well as giving students the ability to compete and participate in future exchanges and study in the United States. Approximately 95,000 students in more than 85 countries have participated in the program since its founding in 2004.

== Objectives ==
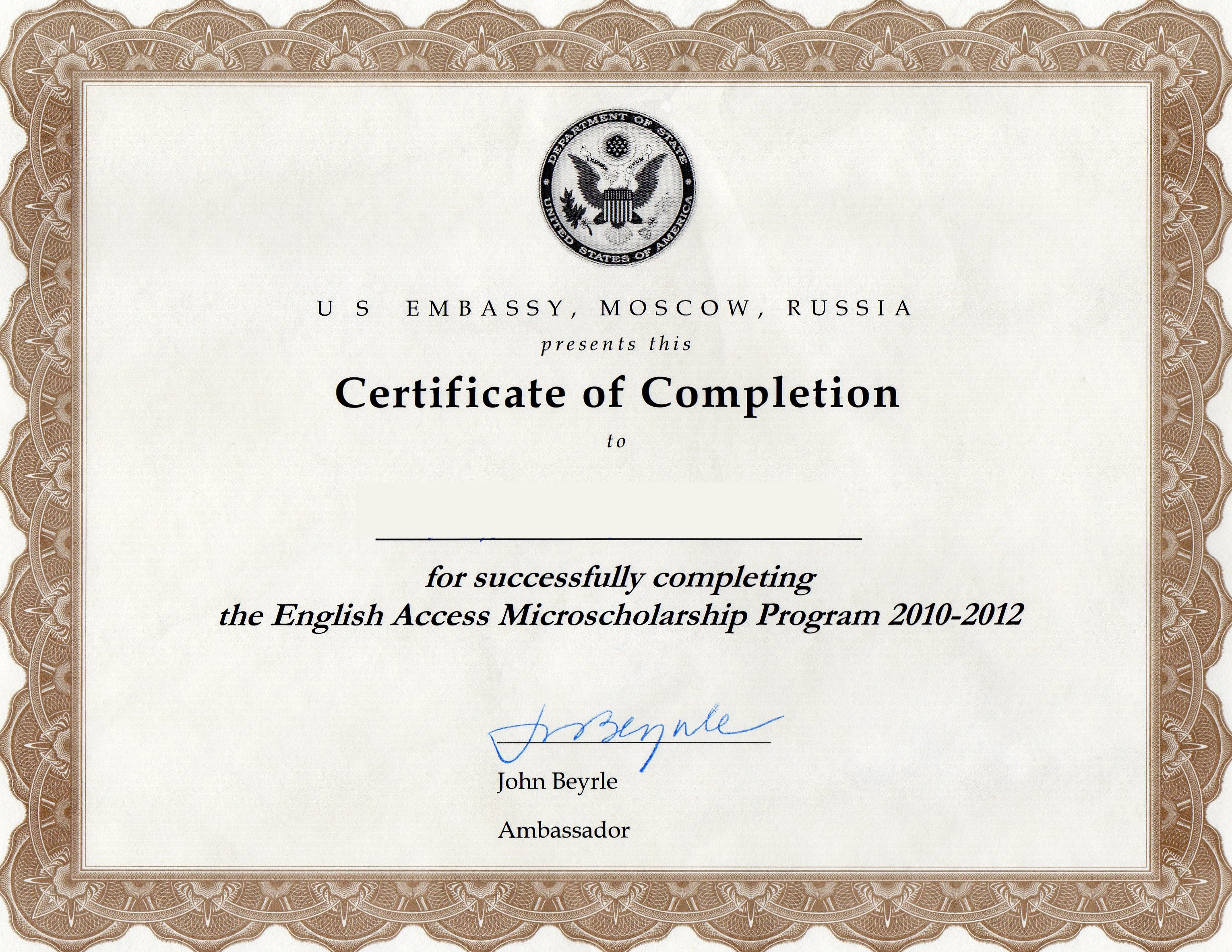
Students who complete the program are awarded a certificate

The principal objective of Access is to change the life of the students, improving their social skills and leadership. It develops social awareness about the country's problems, and how they can solve them as well. Although learning a new language can be difficult, Access tries to improve the system of learning and makes it part of the student's life, not as an obligation.

The English Access Microscholarship Program (Access) provides a foundation of English language skills to bright, economically disadvantaged students, primarily between the ages of 13 and 20, in their home countries. Access programs give participants English skills that may lead to better jobs and educational prospects. Participants also gain the ability to compete for and participate in future exchanges and study in the United States.

Since its inception in 2004, approximately 150,000 students in more than 80 countries have participated in the Access Program.

== Requirements ==
To apply to this scholarship, the participant should be a non-US citizen and be between the age of 13 and 20. Each accepted student receives 128 hours of instruction per year. They attend 4 hours per week, for a total of 32 weeks, plus 72 hours of intensive two-week summer programs and camps each year.

== Who can apply ==
Students with an excellent academic record who:

- Are 13 to 18 years old
- live in the areas where the program exists
- show leadership skills
- are interested in learning English
- have little to no knowledge of English language
- can provide supports to a low socioeconomic status
