= Save Our State =

California anti-illegal immigration activist organization

Save Our State logo

Save Our State (SOS) is an activist organization opposed to illegal immigration in California. The organization's methodology revolves around the 'transference of pain' and it has been described as a hate group by the Southern Poverty Law Center.

As of November 2009, the Saveourstate.org has become inactive and bears the message "Saveourstate.org forums and website have been closed indefinitely." The Northern California Chapter has since taken over direction of the organization.

== Origin ==
The group takes its name from California's 1994 Proposition 187, known as the "Save Our State" initiative. The proposition, which would have denied taxpayer-funded health care and education to undocumented residents of California, was approved by a majority of voters in 1994 but was immediately challenged in court and was eventually struck down by a US district court four years later.

The group was incorporated in July 2004 by Ventura resident Joseph Turner, who was unsatisfied with the existing immigration-reform groups whose letter-writing campaigns he deemed ineffectual. In an interview, Turner stated, "Our belief is that if that worked or had any sort of positive influence, we wouldn’t be in the situation we’re in." In contrast, SOS's tactics are statedly "aggressive", and "in-your-face". Their language reflects this, intentionally eschewing what they perceive to be the political correctness that characterized the language of the 1990s. In the opinion of Turner and many of his supporters, political correctness and multiculturalism are both factors that contribute to the continued entry of illegal aliens into the United States.

== Tactics ==
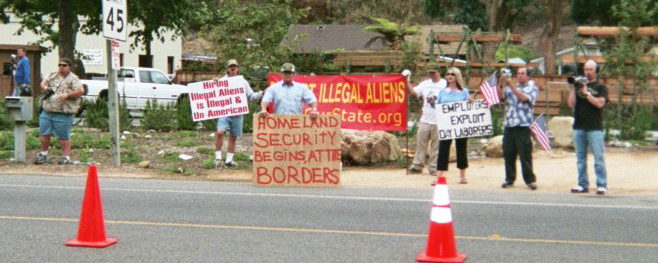
Save Our State protests a day labor center in Laguna Beach, September 25, 2005.

Members of Save Our State frequently travel outside of their hometowns to protest day labor sites in other communities, sometimes eliciting criticism from locals for doing so. They are known to carry signs, pepper spray and other weapons, and video cameras with which to post footage from the day's events to video-sharing services.

The underlying philosophy of the protests is referred to by Turner as "the transference of pain", a tactic for which he credits his wife.

== Activities ==
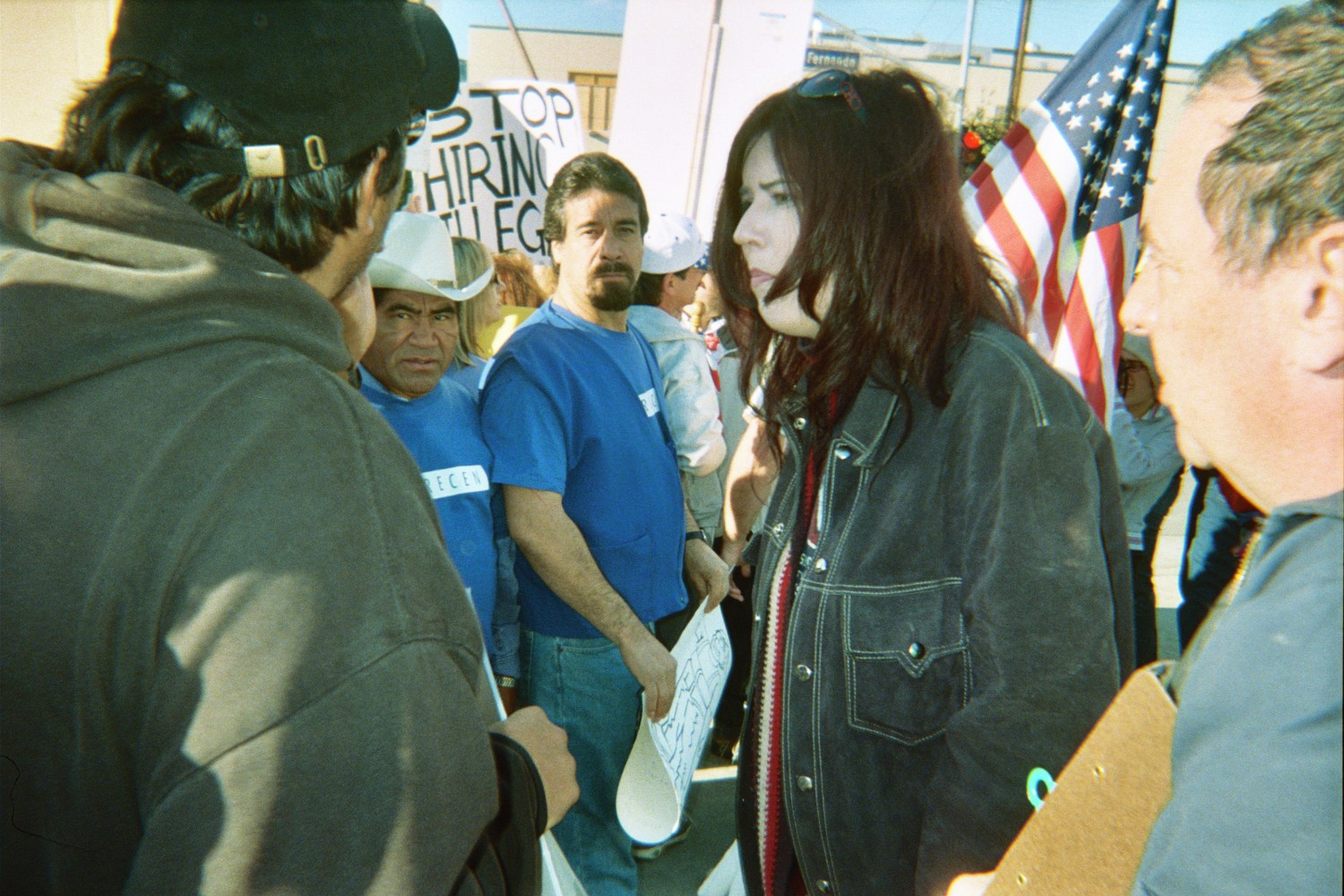
SOS and counterdemonstrators outside of a Home Depot in Glendale, California, December 10, 2005.

SOS's first action was in December 2004, when, after launching a website with a forum, they announced a boycott of Home Depot for funding day labor centers on or near their store locations. This campaign continues to the present, and SOS members routinely travel to Home Depot locations to protest.

=== Baldwin Park ===
The group's next action provoked a great deal of controversy. SOS protested the monumental artwork Danzas Indigenas at the Baldwin Park Metrolink station. The work, commissioned by the city and designed by UCLA professor, Chicana artist, and SPARC founder Judy Baca with community input, featured several inscriptions on Mission-style arches, two of which drew the ire of anti-illegal immigration activists. A quote from the Chicana writer Gloria Anzaldúa reads, "This land was Mexican once, was Indian always and is, and will be again." The other read "It was better before they came." About the first quote, Turner stated, "It's seditious. It essentially talks about returning this land to Mexico." About the second quote, which Baca states was actually uttered by a white Baldwin Park resident lamenting the influx of Mexicans after World War II, Baca has stated that it is deliberately ambiguous to allow the viewer's interpretation of "they" to reveal something about the viewer. SOS claims the referent of "they" is "white people".

On May 14, 2005, approximately 25 members of Save Our State held signs in front of the monument. 300 counterprotesters also showed up, shouting such slogans as "Racists go home" and displaying the flag of Mexico when squaring off against the American flags carried by Save Our State. Police in riot gear were called in from several neighboring departments to maintain a wall of separation between the groups. One woman was injured; she was held overnight for observation but was released the next day.

The event was covered in local newspapers, as well as by writers for the Los Angeles Independent Media Center, and in broadcast media by KPFK's Uprising and What's Right With America (WRWA), a conservative public-access television cable TV talk show in Santa Barbara, California.

Former Mayor of Baldwin Park Manuel Lozano has publicly defended the language of the monument as a work of art, therefore free expression, and has demonstrated his support for counterprotesting organizations with "handshake walk" among their ranks. He has publicly described Save Our State as a 'hate group'. Mayor Lozano led the Baldwin Park City Council to formally proclaim that the monument would remain intact on June 25, 2005.

== Alleged ties to extremist groups ==
Save Our State has been described as an anti-immigrant hate group by the Southern Poverty Law Center. In 2005, the SPLC reported that white supremacists had participated in Save Our State demonstrations, and stated that the Save Our State online forums frequently contain derogatory or hate-based statements about Mexicans and other Latinos. The same report quotes Turner as saying "there seems to be very little we can do to keep them from piggybacking off our activism. ... [W]e are unable to really do anything about it." And admits that he has kicked several white supremacists off the forums, though he allows offensive comments to remain, as long as they do not advocate violence.

SOS leaders have forced the most extremist of racist skinheads to leave their protests, and banned them from the group's events. However, protesters with Confederate flag clothing are still routinely reported to be seen at protests.
