= Hispanic Scholarship Fund =

- Awarded for: Academic merit
- Country: United States
- Eligibility: Students of Hispanic descent
- Reward: Ranging from $500 to $5,000
- First award: 1975; 51 years ago
- Website: www.hsf.net

The Hispanic Scholarship Fund (HSF) is a nonprofit organization aiming to prepare Hispanic young people to become professionals in the future. The HSF was founded in 1975 with the purpose to identify students of Latino or Hispanic origin and assisting them in attending college and graduate school. The HSF selects 10,000 designated scholars each year and assists them in finding a university, help to source financing, search for internships, and with HSF's business partnerships, place them in jobs.

The HSF was founded in 1975 by Korean War veteran Oscar Robles and his wife, Dora, who took out a $30,000 second mortgage on their home. Initially focused on assisting Latino college students ton complete college, the fund now assists students throughout their education and career development. Through 2022, the HSF has provided over $700 million in scholarships to Latino students.

== Requirements ==
According to the HSF website, the following requirements apply for applicants to the HSF Scholars Program:

- Be of Hispanic descent.
- Be a U.S. citizen, legal permanent resident, or recipient of Deferred Action for Childhood Arrivals (DACA).
- Have a minimum GPA of 3.0 on a 4.0 scale (or equivalent) for high school students.
- Have a minimum GPA of 2.5 on a 4.0 scale (or equivalent) for undergraduate and graduate students.
- Plan to enroll full-time in an accredited, public or non-for profit, four-year university or graduate program in the United States.
- Submit the FAFSA and other state-based financial aid forms if applicable.
