= Camino Del Rey Association =

American high school athletic league

The Camino Del Rey Association is a high school athletic league that is part of the CIF Southern Section. It is an amalgamation of the Camino Real League, the Del Rey League and the Santa Fe League. Members are generally the Catholic schools located in Los Angeles County.

== Members ==
- Bellarmine-Jefferson High School
- Bishop Amat Memorial High School
- Bishop Montgomery High School
- Cantwell-Sacred Heart of Mary High School
- Cathedral High School
- Don Bosco Technical Institute (Bosco Tech)
- La Salle High School
- Mary Star of the Sea High School
- Paraclete High School
- Pomona Catholic High School
- Salesian High School
- Junípero Serra High School
- St. Anthony High School
- St. Bernard High School
- St. Genevieve High School
- St. Joseph High School
- St. Mary's Academy
- Saint Monica Catholic High School
- St. Paul High School
- St. Pius X / St. Matthias Academy
- Verbum Dei High School (football only)
