= Santa Fe League =

High school athletic league in California

The Santa Fe League is a high school athletic league that is part of the CIF Southern Section.

== Member schools ==
=== Co-ed schools ===
- Mary Star of the Sea High School (San Pedro)
- Paraclete High School (Lancaster)
- St. Bernard High School (Playa del Rey)
- St. Genevieve High School (Panorama City)
- St. Paul High School (Santa Fe Springs)
- St. Pius X - St. Matthias Academy (Downey)

=== Boys schools ===
- Bosco Tech (Rosemead)
- Salesian High School (Boyle Heights)
- Verbum Dei High School (Watts)

=== Girls schools ===
- Bishop Conaty-Our Lady of Loretto High School (Los Angeles)
- Pomona Catholic High School (Pomona)
- Ramona Convent Secondary School (Alhambra)
- Sacred Heart of Jesus High School (Lincoln Heights)
- San Gabriel Mission High School (San Gabriel)
- St. Mary's Academy (Inglewood)
