= Camino Real League =

The Camino Real League is a high school athletic league that is part of the CIF Southern Section.

== Member schools ==
- Bishop Montgomery High School (Torrance)
- Bosco Tech (Rosemead)
- Cantwell-Sacred Heart of Mary High School (Montebello)
- Cathedral High School (Los Angeles)
- La Salle College Preparatory (Pasadena)
- Paraclete (Lancaster)
- Mary Star of the Sea (San Pedro)
- Ramona Convent (Alhambra)
- St. Anthony High School (Long Beach)
- St. Bernard High School (Playa del Rey)
- St. Genevieve High School (Panorama City)
- St. Mary's Academy (Inglewood)
- St. Monica Catholic High School (Santa Monica)
- St. Paul (Santa Fe Springs)
- Salesian High School (Boyle Heights)

== Popular culture ==
- In the film Gridiron Gang, the team of the Juvenile detention center "Mustangs" played against the teams of a fictionalised Camino Real League.
