= Horizon League (California) =

High school athletic league in California

The Horizon League is a high school athletic league that is part of the CIF Southern Section. Members are all-girls Roman Catholic college preparatory schools located western San Gabriel Valley, Glendale, mid-city and Lincoln Heights neighborhoods of Los Angeles.

== Members ==
- Alverno Heights Academy (Sierra Madre) (Closed in 2023)
- Bishop Conaty-Our Lady of Loretto High School (Los Angeles)
- Holy Family High School (Glendale)
- Ramona Convent Secondary School (Alhambra)
- Sacred Heart of Jesus High School (Lincoln Heights)
- San Gabriel Mission High School
