= J. Michael Adams =

J. Michael Adams (October 22, 1947 – June 21, 2012) was the president of Fairleigh Dickinson University and the president of the International Association of University Presidents.

== Biography ==
Adams received a Bachelor of Science from Illinois State University in 1969, a Master of Science from the University of Illinois at Urbana-Champaign in 1972, and a PhD from Southern Illinois University Carbondale in 1976. He also received a degree in Institute for Educational Management from the Harvard Graduate School of Education in 1997.

He started his academic career at the State University of New York at Oswego, where he became full professor and Dean of the Alumni College. He was also a Congressional Fellow for Representative Carl C. Perkins. He then served as Dean of the Nesbitt College of Design Arts at Drexel University for fifteen years. He also worked for RR Donnelley and the Jacob K. Javits Convention Center. He became the president of Fairleigh Dickinson University on July 1, 1999.

Among his innovations at Fairleigh Dickinson University was in 2001 the inauguration of PublicMind, an independent survey research group which quickly gained a national reputation; launching the United Nations Pathways program, which brings members of the diplomatic corps to campus for interaction with students; helped the institution gain nongovernmental organization (NGO) status at the United Nations; making Fairleigh Dickinson University the first university in the world to earn "Special Consultative Status" with the United Nations Economic and Social Council (ECOSOC). In addition, Dr. Adams spearheaded numerous innovative offerings including the Spanish-to-English degree program Puerta al Futuro, community college partnerships, as well as a national model support program for veterans.

He was a member of the Danforth Foundation, the Soderstrom Society of Fellows, and the Royal Society for the Encouragement of Arts, Manufactures and Commerce. He received an honorary PhD from Kyungnam University in South Korea in 2006. He was a member of the Governing Council of the United Nations University, Steering Committee of the World Bank's Researchers Alliance for Development and the Editorial Advisory Board for International Educator, the flagship bimonthly magazine of NAFSA: Association of International Educators.

Adams died on June 21, 2012, of leukemia.

== Bibliography ==
- Coming of Age in a Globalized World: The Next Generation (co-authored with Angelo Carfagna, 2006)
- Printing Technology, 5th Edition (co-authored with Penny Ann Dolan, 2001)
- Printing Technology, 4th Edition (co-authored with David D. Faux and Lloyd J. Rieber, 1993)
- Printing Technology, 3rd Edition (co-authored with David D. Faux and Lloyd J. Rieber, 1988)
- Printing Technology, 2nd Edition (co-authored with David D. Faux, 1983)
- Printing Technology (co-authored with David D. Faux, 1978)
- Career Change: A Planning Book (1983)
