= International Association of University Presidents =

Higher education association

- Abbreviation: IAUP
- Formation: 1964
- Type: NGO
- Location: New York City, New York, U.S.
- Website: iaup.org

The International Association of University Presidents (IAUP) is an association of university chief executives from higher education institutions around the world. The IAUP was founded in 1964 in Oxford. Membership is limited to those individuals who serve as presidents, rectors or vice-chancellors at regionally accredited colleges or universities.

The primary purpose is to strengthen the international mission and quality of education of higher education institutions around the world.

== Overview ==
It is a non-governmental organization holding the highest (ECOSOC) consultation rights at the United Nations and formal consultation rights with UNESCO. It is headquartered in the United Nations Plaza in New York City. IAUP counts about 120 universities' representatives from 21 countries.

IAUP is a founding member of the World University Consortium, a major initiative of the World Academy of Art and Science to design a global system of higher education attuned to emerging opportunities and challenges.

The association hosts a gathering of chief executive officers from universities around the world every three years.

== History ==
The IAUP was founded in 1964 by university leaders from the United States, South Korea, Puerto Rico, the Philippines and Liberia. The inaugural conference took place in June 1965 in Oxford, England.

== Mission ==
IAUP's mission includes providing a worldwide vision of higher education, sponsoring effective networking between university leaders, and promoting peace and international understanding through education.

== List of presidents ==
- 2021-2023 Fernando Leon Garcia, President of CETYS University System, Mexico
- 2017–2020 Kakha Shengelia, President of Caucasus University, Tbilisi, Georgia
- 2014–2017 Toyoshi Satow, President of J.F. Oberlin University, Tokyo, Japan
- 2012–2014 Neal King, President of Antioch University Los Angeles, United States
- 2011–2012 J. Michael Adams, President of Fairleigh Dickinson University, United States
- 2008–2011 Barham Madaín Ayub, President of Viña del Mar University, Chile
- 2005–2008 Pornchai Mongkhonvanit, President of Siam University, Thailand
- 2002–2005 Ingrid Moses, Chancellor of University of Canberra, Australia
- 1999–2002 Sven Caspersen, Rector of Aalborg University, Denmark
- 1996–1999 Donald Gerth, President of California State University, Sacramento, United States
- 1993–1996 Kan Ichi Miyaji, Japan
- 1990–1993 Rafael Catagena, Puerto Rico
- 1987–1990 Luis Garibay, Mexico
- 1984–1987 Nibhond Sasidhorn, Thailand
- 1981–1984 Leland Miles, President of University of Bridgeport, United States
- 1974–1981 Young Seek Choue, President of Kyung Hee University, Seoul, Korea
- 1971–1974 Young Seek Choue (as acting president), Korea
- 1971 (briefly) Rocheforte Weeks, Liberia
- 1964–1971 Peter Sammartino, United States

== Partnerships ==
The IAUP partners with the American Association of State Colleges and Universities, the American Council on Education, the Association of Commonwealth Universities, the Association of Universities of Asia and the Pacific, the World Academy of Art and Science, the European Universities Association, the International Association of Universities, the United Nations Department of Public Information, the World Bank Research Alliance for Development, the UNESCO, the Union of Mediterranean Universities, and Universities Australia.
