= St. John Paul II STEM Academy =

St. John Paul II STEM Academy at Bellarmine-Jefferson
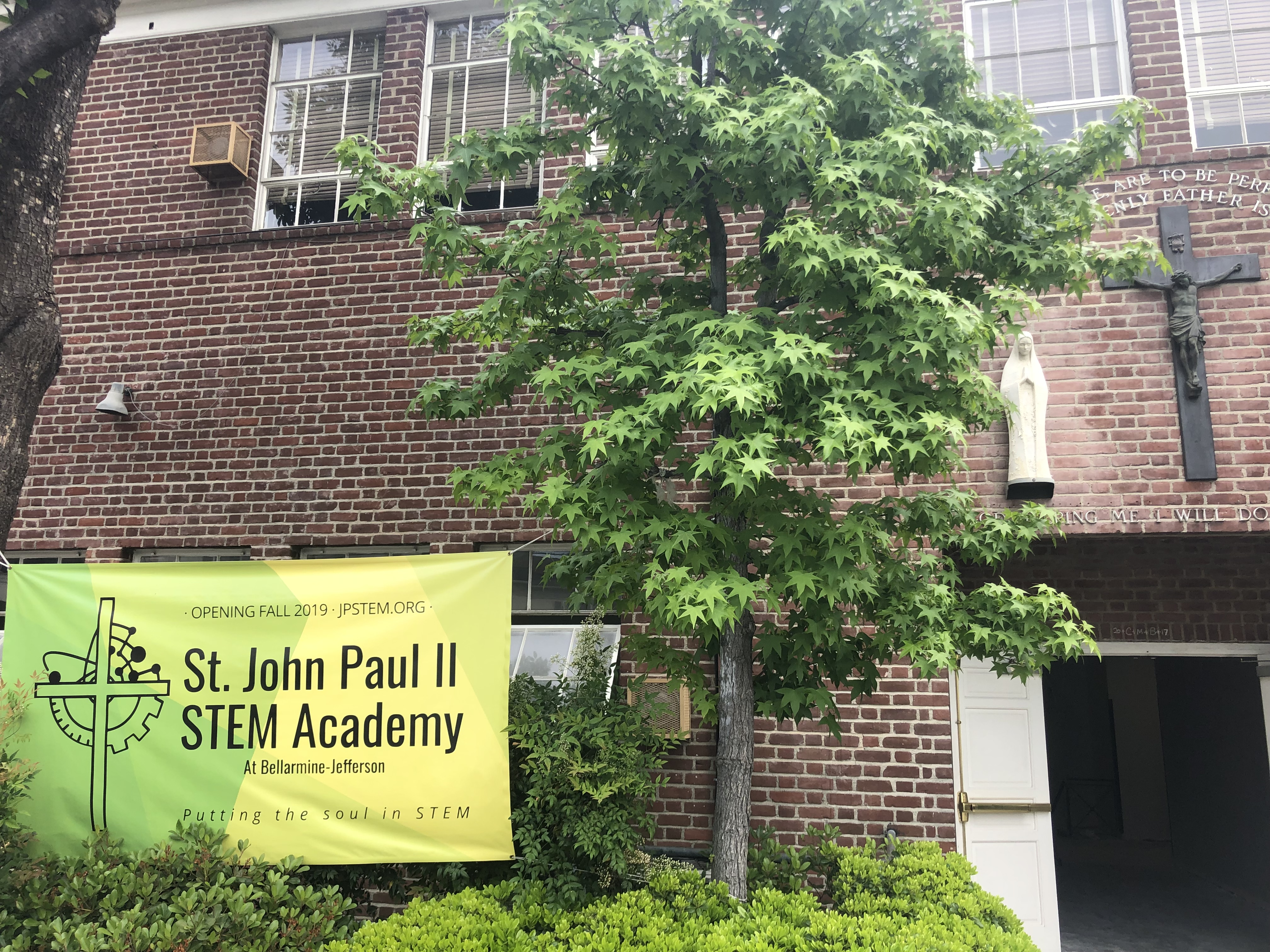

Location
- 465 East Olive Avenue; Burbank, (Los Angeles County), California 91501; United States; 34°11′3″N 118°18′20″W

Information
- Type: Private, Coeducational
- Motto: God helping me, I will do my best today
- Religious affiliation: Roman Catholic
- Patron saint: St. John Paul II
- Established: 2019
- Status: Closed
- Closed: 2020
- President: Dr. Jeff Hilger
- Grades: 9-12
- Athletics conference: CIF - Southern Section; Camino Del Rey Association
- Accreditation: Western Association of Schools and Colleges
- Website: http://www.jpstem.org

St. John Paul II STEM Academy at Bellarmine-Jefferson was a private, STEM-focused Catholic high school in Burbank, California, launched in August 2019. It was owned and administered by the Roman Catholic Archdiocese of Los Angeles at the former site of Bellarmine-Jefferson High School, which had closed in 2018. St. John Paul II STEM Academy closed in 2020 after one year of operation.

== Background ==
In October 2017, The Archdiocese of Los Angeles announced that it would close Bellarmine-Jefferson High School at the end of the 2017–18 academic year, and would re-open after restructuring in 2019. The creation of a STEM Academy was announced in June 2018, with an opening date of August 2019 and Jeff Hilger hired as its founding director. The school would be dedicated to the recently canonized St. John Paul II.

The COVID-19 pandemic dealt a heavy blow to Archdiocesan schools, and the nascent academy closed in 2020 after a single year of operation.

== Academics ==
JP2 STEM Academy had two specialized pathways: Engineering and Media Arts. The academic day was to feature a 4×4 block schedule. Students would take four semester-length courses at a time, arranged in a block schedule. Students would also complete courses in ethics and humanities. In order to graduate, each senior would have completed a Capstone Project.

== See also ==
- St. Robert Bellarmine Catholic Church
