= Itohan Aikhionbare =

Belize-American athlete (born 1994)

Personal information
- Nickname: Itos
- Born: March 29, 1994 (age 32)
- Height: 5 ft 7 in (1.70 m)

Sport
- Country: Belize
- Sport: Field, Shot put, Discus throw
- Event(s): Shot put and Discus throw
- College team: UCI Anteaters '15; Oregon Ducks track and field '16
- Turned pro: 2016
- Coached by: Katelyn Ciarelli

Achievements and titles
- Personal best: Shot Put: 16.85

Itohan Aikhionbare (born March 29, 1994) is a Belize-American athlete who competes in Shot put and Discus throw.

== Prep ==
Itohan Aikhionbare grew up in Eagle Rock, California and is a 2011 graduate of La Salle High School (Pasadena, California). Aikhionbare represented the La Salle HS Mounted Lancer and Del Rey League in CIF Southern Section and California Interscholastic Federation state championships. Itohan Aikhionbare was 1st team all-league in basketball and track & field in 2009-2011.

Year	Del Rey League Outdoor	CIF SS Outdoor	California Interscholastic Federation Outdoor
2010-11		Shot put 41' 1.5 1st	Shot put 37' 3.75 20th
2010-11		Discus 127' 2 3rd	
2009-10		Shot put 36' 3 7th	
2009-10		Discus 131' 6 1st	
2008-09		Pole vault 8' 0 9th	
2008-09		Discus 106' 8 5th	

== NCAA ==
Aikhionbare won two Big West Conference champion in 2014 and NCAA Division I All-American in Shot Put in 2016. Aikhionbare moved another step up University of Oregon's career best list in the shot put with a winning throw of 54 feet, 4 ½ inches. She now is No. 2 in Oregon history, behind only teammate Brittany Mann. Aikhionbare holds the top mark in UC Irvine Anteaters history as the best shot put 53 feet, 9 inches. Aikhionbare is also a two-time UCI/Big West Scholar-Athlete of the Year.

Year	Competition	Venue	Position	Event	Notes
Representing Oregon Ducks
Year	MPSF indoor	NCAA indoor	Pac-12 Outdoor	NCAA Outdoor	
2015-16	Shot put 16.12 m (52 ft 10 1/2 in) 5th	Shot put 15.55 m (51 ft 0 in) 16th	Shot put 16.30 m (53 ft 5 1/2 in) 2nd	Shot put 16.54 m (54 ft 3 in) 25th	
2015-16			Discus; 49.81 m (163 ft 5 in) 8th	Discus; 47.36 m (155 ft 4 1/2 in) 70th	
Representing UC Irvine Anteaters
Year	MPSF indoor	NCAA indoor	Big West Outdoor	NCAA Outdoor	
2013-14	Shot put 15.32 m (50 ft 3 in) 4th		Shot put 15.02 m (49 ft 3 1/4 in) 1st	Shot put 15.76 m (51 ft 8 1/4 in) 34th	
2013-14			Discus; 51.13 m (167 ft 8 3/4 in) 1st	Discus; 50.71 m (166 ft 4 1/4 in) 34th	
2012-13	Shot put 14.46 m (47 ft 5 1/4 in) 10th		Shot put 15.53 m (50 ft 11 1/4 in) 2nd	Shot put 15.04 m (49 ft 4 in) 59th	
2012-13			Discus; 48.39 m (158 ft 9 in) 4th	Discus; 45.96 m (150 ft 9 1/4 in) 67th	
2012-13			Hammer; 47.18 m (154 ft 9 1/4 in) 14th		
2011-12	Shot put 13.04 m (42 ft 9 1/4 in) 13th		Shot put 13.38 m (43 ft 10 3/4 in) 3rd		
2011-12			Discus; 38.89 m (127 ft 7 in) 10th		

== Professional ==
Aikhionbare competes for Belize Athletic Association international competitions. On June 17, 2016, Aikhionbare threw 15.67 m (51 ft 4 3/4 in) at 2016 Central American Championships in Athletics setting a Central American Championships record. Later that summer, Aikhionbare set a Belizean shot put record at 2016 NACAC Under-23 Championships in Athletics with a throw of 16.20 m (53 ft 1 3/4 in).
