= Bellarmine-Jefferson High School =

Private school in Burbank, California, United States

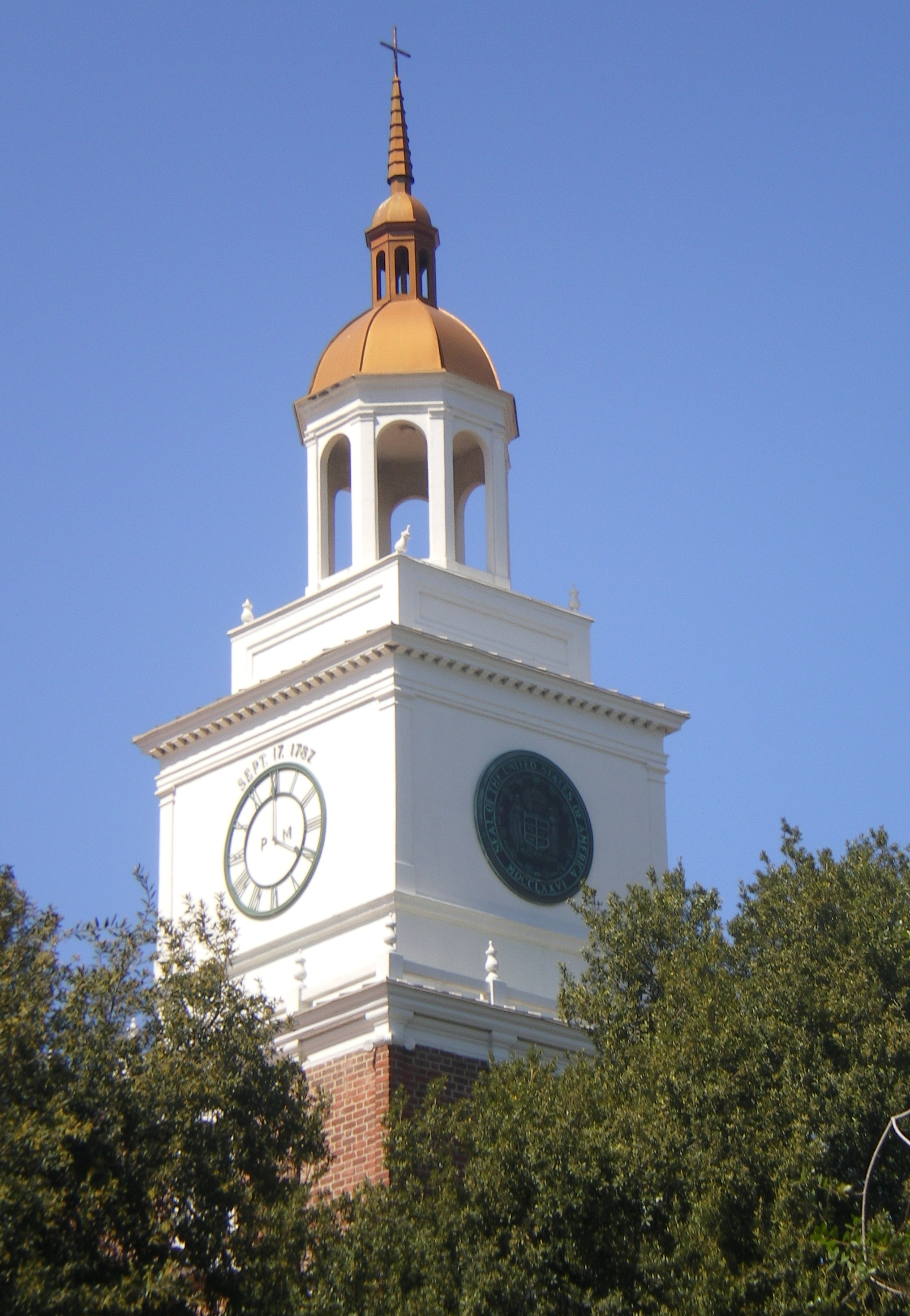
- Steeple at Bellarmine-Jefferson

Location
- 465 East Olive Avenue; Burbank, (Los Angeles County), California 91501; United States; 34°11′3″N 118°18′20″W

Information
- Type: Private, Coeducational
- Motto: God helping me, I will do my best today
- Religious affiliation: Roman Catholic
- Patron saint: Robert Bellarmine
- Established: 1944
- Closed: 2018
- Grades: 9-12
- Colors: Red, White and Blue
- Athletics conference: CIF - Southern Section; Camino Del Rey Association
- Team name: Guards
- Accreditation: Western Association of Schools and Colleges
- Newspaper: The Guardian
- Website: http://www.jpstem.org

Bellarmine-Jefferson High School was a private, Roman Catholic high school in Burbank, California. It was located in the Roman Catholic Archdiocese of Los Angeles. The school was reopened in 2019 as St. John Paul II STEM Academy, which later closed in 2020.

== Background ==
Bellarmine-Jefferson was a co-educational Catholic high school in Burbank, California, that was founded by Monsignor Martin Cody Keating in 1944. Keating selected the school's name from St. Robert Bellarmine, a 17th-century Italian Jesuit priest, and Thomas Jefferson, the nation's third president.

The school colors are Red, White, and Royal Blue. The school mascot was the Guard, named for the Swiss Guard organization that has protected the pope since 1506. Bell-Jeff celebrated its first commencement ceremony with the class of 1948. The school's unofficial motto was "God helping me I will do my best today," a quote attributed to St. Robert Bellarmine. The school closed in Spring 2018.

== Architecture ==
The school's main building is a replica of the old Pennsylvania State House, also known as Independence Hall, located in Philadelphia, Pennsylvania. Adjacent to the main building is St. Eleanor's Hall, a replica of the main library at the University of Virginia, designed by Thomas Jefferson. The main entry to St. Eleanor's Hall has 13 steps, representing the original Thirteen Colonies in the order they became states by ratifying the U.S. Constitution.

The clock tower on the main building is frozen to honor the two famous documents written in Independence Hall. On the north side of the tower is July 4, 1776 @ 8:00 pm to commemorate the signing of the Declaration of Independence and on the south side is September 17, 1787 @ 4:00 pm to commemorate the signing of the U.S. Constitution.

== Academics ==
Bell-Jeff was a four-year college preparatory high school. As of the 2014-2015 school year the school offered eight Advanced Placement courses (Calculus, Chemistry, Chinese Language & Culture, English Literature, European History, Psychology, Spanish Language, and United States History), UC approved college prep courses, and a host of electives.

In its later years, the school sent students to the University of Notre Dame, Johns Hopkins University, Georgetown University, Columbia University, Boston University, Glendale Community College (California), UCLA, University of California, Berkeley, USC, St. John's University, UC Santa Barbara, UC Irvine, Los Angeles Valley College, Occidental College, University of Arizona, UC Riverside, Loyola Marymount University, Pepperdine University, University of Nevada Las Vegas, and Marymount California University and St Mary's College of Moraga, California.

== Athletics ==
Bell-Jeff offered 14 varsity sports. Girls competed in the Santa Fe League of the CIF Southern Section in six sports while boys competed in the Santa Fe League of CIF-SS in eight sports. The school is part of the Freelance League.

=== Cross Country ===
The Cross Country teams were arguably the school's most successful sports program. The girls team won its league championship seven times since 2000, most recently in 2008, and was a consistent challenger in the CIF-SS Division V. Both teams hosted the annual Bellarmine-Jefferson Cross Country Invitational at Griffith Park. The Bell-Jeff Invitational was one of the largest and longest-running invitationals in Southern California. It was also the longest running event in Griffith Park.

=== Basketball ===
The most popular sport at Bell-Jeff has had it greatest success in the past two decades. The boys team has made the CIF-SS playoffs six consecutive years and had California's state leader in scoring in 1998 in Ruben Douglas. Douglas went on to lead the NCAA in scoring as a senior at the University of New Mexico and played professional basketball in Europe. The Guards last won the Santa Fe league title in 2011, ending a 14-year drought. The Lady Guards proudly own the school's only two sectional championships, winning the CIF-SS title during the 1996-1997 season and most recently during the 2008-2009 campaign. The 2008-2009 team went on to win the Southern California regional championship and then on March 20, 2009 defeated Pinewood Prep, 55-47, at Arco Arena in Sacramento to win the school's first California State Championship. The state championship was also the first ever for any Burbank area high school in a team sport. In addition, the team has appeared in the CIF-SS title game two times, losing both in 2003 and 2008. The Girls team also won the Nike Tournament of Champions in the Grey Division in 2008 and placed 3rd in 2009. After winning the CIF and State titles in 2009, the Lady Guards advanced to the CIF Semi-Finals for three consecutive seasons, 2010-2012. During the 2012 season Rishonda Napier was named the LA Daily News player of the year and was nominated as a McDonald's All-American. The Lady Guards basketball team won the 2017 CIF-SS Division 5A Championship and advanced to the CIF Semi-Finals in the State Tournament.

=== Football ===
The football team returned to play its 2012 home games at newly constructed Memorial Field on the campus of John Burroughs, after playing its 2011 home games at North Hollywood HS. Despite the school's small student population, the football team is consistently ranked in the top-ten of CIF-SS's Northeast Division. The team has won four league championships in its history - 1954, 2000, 2004, and most recently 2007. The 2008 team won the schools' 1st CIF playoff game since 1954, before falling in the CIF Quarterfinals.

=== Volleyball ===
Both teams play their home games in Keating Memorial Gymnasium (nicknamed "The Guard House") on campus. The girls team won seven consecutive Santa Cruz league titles from 2006 to 2012. The girls had a 49-1 record during that time which included a winning streak of 46 matches. In 2009, the team advanced all the way to the CIF-SS Division IVA Championship game, the only title game appearance in school history. The Lady Guards had advanced to the CIF Quarterfinals in 1993 and 2008. In 2010 the girls reached the CIF Semi-Finals and then the Quarterfinals in 2011 - both years falling to the eventual division champion. The boys team also has fared well in recent years, qualifying for the CIF-SS Division V playoffs three consecutive years and having their finest season in 2007 when they advanced to the CIF Quarterfinals.

=== Baseball/Softball ===
The baseball team plays its home games at Burbank's Brace Park and competes in CIF-SS Division V. The team ended an almost twenty-year drought by winning the Santa Fe League Championship in 2005. The team qualified for the CIF-SS playoffs for nine consecutive years from 2003 to 2011. The softball team competes at Burbank's Gross Park and has qualified for the CIF-SS playoffs in each of the last nine seasons, winning its first playoff game since 1994 in 2008.

== Notable alumni ==
- Alan Alda - actor
- Angie Dickinson - actress
- Ruben Douglas - professional basketball player
- Michael Galeota - actor
- Nancy McKeon - actress
- Philip McKeon - actor
- Kevin Roentgen - guitarist of Buckcherry
- Doug Savant - actor
- Bobby Schayer - drummer of Bad Religion
- Tim Doyle - television writer and producer

== See also ==
- St. Robert Bellarmine Catholic Church
