= Ruben Douglas =

American-Panamanian basketball player (1979–2024)

Personal information
- Born: October 30, 1979 Altadena, California, U.S.
- Died: April 12, 2024 (aged 44) Costa Rica
- Listed height: 6 ft 5 in (1.96 m)
- Listed weight: 210 lb (95 kg)

Career information
- High school: Bellarmine-Jefferson (Burbank, California)
- College: Arizona (1998–1999); New Mexico (2000–2003)
- NBA draft: 2003: undrafted
- Playing career: 2003–2012
- Position: Point guard / shooting guard

Career history
- 2003–2004: Panionios
- 2004–2005: Climamio Bologna
- 2005–2006: Dynamo Moscow
- 2006–2009: Valencia
- 2009: Lottomatica Roma
- 2010: Cajasol Sevilla
- 2012: Uşak Üniversitesi Belediyespor

Career highlights
- EuroCup Finals MVP (2006); EuroCup champion (2006); Italian League champion (2005); AP Honorable Mention All-American (2003); NCAA scoring champion (2003); Mountain West Player of the Year (2003); 2× First-team All-Mountain West (2002, 2003); Second-team All-Mountain West (2001); Mountain West All-Freshman team (2001)

Ruben Enrique Douglas (October 30, 1979 – April 12, 2024) was an American-Panamanian professional basketball player. He was a 1.96-metre (6 ft 5 in), 210-pound (95 kg) point guard-shooting guard.

== High school ==
Douglas was born in Altadena, California. He played high school basketball at Bellarmine-Jefferson High School in Burbank, California. He is ranked as one of the most prolific high school scorers in California state history.

== College career ==
After high school, Douglas played college basketball at the University of Arizona with the Arizona Wildcats in the 1998–99 season. Douglas led the NCAA in scoring with a 28.0 points per game average during the 2002–03 season as a senior at the University of New Mexico while playing with the New Mexico Lobos. He was also named the Mountain West Conference MVP.

== Professional career ==
After going undrafted by any NBA teams, Douglas played for Panionios of the Greek league (2003–04), Virtus Roma and Fortitudo Bologna (2004–05) of the Italian league, the latter with whom he won the Italian national championship, as well as Dynamo Moscow of the Russian league (2005–06), and Valencia of the Spanish league (2006–09). In 2010, he returned to Panionios.

Douglas won the EuroCup championship in 2006 with Dynamo Moscow, and he was also named the EuroCup Finals MVP. Douglas last played with Uşak Üniversitesi Belediyespor, a Turkish team playing in the Turkish Second Division, starting in January 2012. He played against Tenis Eskrim Dağcılık in his first game with Uşak Belediyespor, on January 8, 2012.

== National team career ==
Douglas was also a member of the senior men's Panama national basketball team that competed at the 2006 FIBA World Championship.

== Career statistics ==
=== Domestic leagues ===
| Season | Team | League | GP | MPG | FG% | 3P% | FT% | RPG | APG | SPG | BPG | PPG |
|---|---|---|---|---|---|---|---|---|---|---|---|---|
| 2003–04 | Panionios B.C. | GBL | 26 | 32.2 | .468 | .395 | .808 | 3.7 | 1.5 | 1.3 | .2 | 20.0 |
| 2004–05 | Climamio Bologna | LBA | 44 | 27.0 | .514 | .350 | .783 | 5.0 | 1.5 | 1.4 | .1 | 13.0 |
| 2005–06 | BC Dynamo Moscow | Superleague A | 22 | 27.5 | .417 | .357 | .842 | 3.6 | 1.8 | .9 | .1 | 15.3 |
| 2006–07 | Pamesa Valencia | ACB | 38 | 29.9 | .469 | .321 | .812 | 3.6 | .9 | 1.0 | .4 | 13.6 |
| 2007–08 | Pamesa Valencia | ACB | 37 | 30.5 | .591 | .385 | .839 | 3.1 | 1.1 | .8 | .2 | 16.5 |
| 2008–09 | Pamesa Valencia | ACB | 20 | 25.4 | .452 | .252 | .836 | 3.4 | .7 | 1.1 | .1 | 10.2 |
| 2008–09 | Lottomatica Roma | LBA | 16 | 19.8 | .292 | .355 | .690 | 2.1 | 1.3 | .9 | .1 | 7.2 |
| 2009–10 | Cajasol Sevilla | ACB | 16 | 15.2 | .476 | .383 | .867 | 1.8 | .3 | .4 | .3 | 6.7 |
| 2011–12 | Uşak Üniversitesi Belediyespor | TBL | 4 | 21.5 | .375 | .267 | .762 | 4.0 | 1.3 | 1.3 | 1.0 | 13.0 |

== Personal life and death ==
Douglas had two children. He lived in Arizona and Costa Rica.

Douglas died on April 12, 2024, in Costa Rica, at the age of 44, after experiencing an undisclosed medical issue.
