= Wayne Engelstad =

American basketball player (born 1965)

Personal information
- Born: December 6, 1965 (age 60) Rosemead, California, U.S.
- Listed height: 6 ft 8 in (2.03 m)
- Listed weight: 245 lb (111 kg)

Career information
- High school: Don Bosco Technical Institute (Rosemead, California)
- College: UC Irvine (1984–1988)
- NBA draft: 1988: undrafted
- Playing career: 1988–1999
- Position: Power forward
- Number: 43

Career history
- 1988: Denver Nuggets
- 1988–1989: Albany Patroons
- 1989: Pamesa Valencia
- 1989–1990: Omaha Racers
- 1991: Hobart Tassie Devils
- 1991: Rapid City Thrillers
- 1991–1992: La Crosse Catbirds
- 1993–1994: FC Porto
- 1994–1995: Estudiantes de Bahía Blanca
- 1997–1998: Estrelas da Avenida
- 1998–1999: FC Porto

Career highlights
- CBA champion (1992); First-team All-PCAA (1988)
- Stats at NBA.com
- Stats at Basketball Reference

Wayne Edward Engelstad (born December 6, 1965) is a retired American professional basketball player. Born in Rosemead, California, he was a 6-foot-8-inch (203 cm), 245 lb (111 kg) forward and played collegiately at the University of California, Irvine.

He played for the Denver Nuggets for 11 games in 1988–89, averaging 2.5 points and 1.5 rebounds per contest. He also played in Portugal and with the Hobart Tassie Devils in the Australian NBL in 1991, averaging 18 points per game in 24 contests.

Engelstad won a Continental Basketball Association (CBA) championship with the La Crosse Catbirds in 1992.

Engelstad's daughter Sabrina played in the 2013–2014 season at Saint Mary's before transferring to UC Irvine for the 2016–2017 and 2017–2018 seasons.

== Career statistics ==
Legend
GP	Games played	GS	Games started	MPG	Minutes per game
FG%	Field goal percentage	3P%	3-point field goal percentage	FT%	Free throw percentage
RPG	Rebounds per game	APG	Assists per game	SPG	Steals per game
BPG	Blocks per game	PPG	Points per game	**Bold**	Career high

=== NBA ===
==== Regular season ====
Year	Team	GP	GS	MPG	FG%	3P%	FT%	RPG	APG	SPG	BPG	PPG
1988–89	Denver	11	0	4.5	.379	–	.600	1.5	.6	.1	.0	2.5

== See also ==
- Don Bosco Technical Institute
