= DJ A-Tron =

American DJ

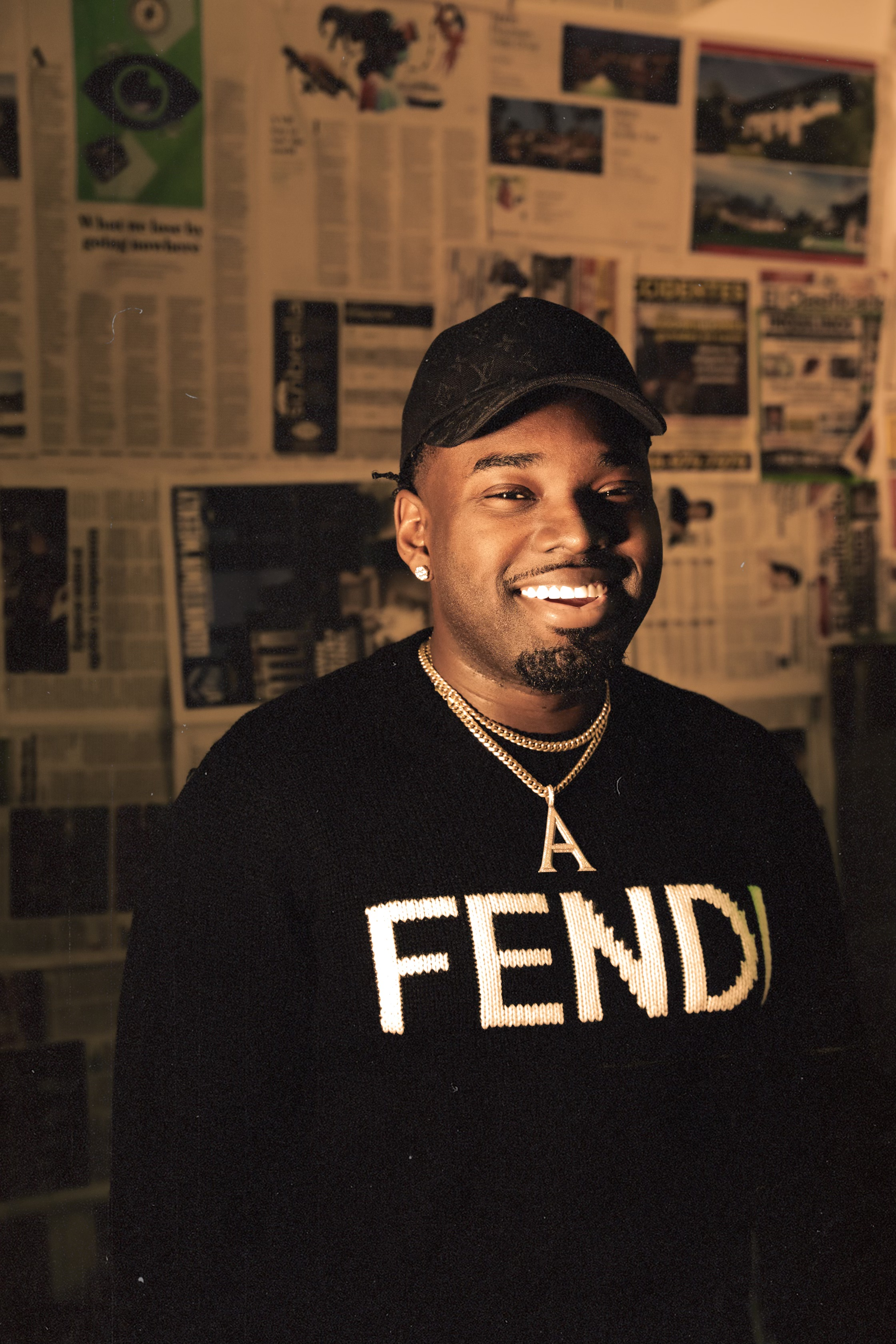
- DJ A-Tron

Background information
- Born: Aaron Williams; April 10, 1993 (age 33); Los Angeles, California, U.S.
- Genre: Hip hop
- Occupations: DJ, producer
- Years active: 2007–present
- Website: a-tron.la

Aaron Williams (born April 10, 1993), best known as DJ A-Tron, is an American DJ, radio host, web personality, event producer, and entrepreneur. He was referred to by the LA Weekly as "The Twerk King". A-Tron has toured nationally and internationally, performing as the personal DJ for RJmrLA and 03 Greedo, and has appeared at major festivals and award events including the Grammy Awards and BET Awards. In April 2024, he headlined and sold out his “DJ A-Tron & Friends” concert at the Observatory in Santa Ana, California, in partnership with Live Nation. His business portfolio also includes a creative marketing and branding agency, as well as an online jewelry store, The Work Shop.

== Early life ==
When A-Tron was seven years old, he realized he loved to DJ and got his first set of turntables. He started DJing more as he got older, working at clubs and house parties.

Starting at age 16, A-Tron hosted his own internet radio show, JerkinRadio, which quickly gained a following in the West Coast "jerkin" dance scene. After graduating from St. Bernard High School (Los Angeles, California) in 2011, A-Tron began headlining at Hollywood clubs and organizing large underground events.

== DJ career ==
A-Tron has performed at official events for the Grammy Awards, BET Awards, and SXSW. He has also appeared at clubs and concerts across the United States. In 2014 he appeared at SXSW, where a mix of his was featured on the festival's website. In April 2024, he headlined and sold out his “DJ A-Tron & Friends” concert at the Observatory in Santa Ana, California, in partnership with Live Nation.

He has DJed at nightlife venues including Avalon Hollywood, The Reserve (Los Angeles), Academy LA, Penthouse Day Club, Dragonfly, and Poppy, among others. Known for moving between club sets, concerts, and private events, A-Tron has also performed at over 50 high school functions in California, including proms, pep rallies, and fundraisers.

JerkinRadio, founded in 2008 while he was in high school, reached approximately 100,000 monthly listeners due to endorsements from figures in the jerkin movement.

In addition to club residencies, A-Tron has worked as a tour DJ for hip hop artists RJmrLA and 03 Greedo, performing at venues nationwide, including the House of Blues in New Orleans. In October 2024, he was part of the supporting lineup when 03 Greedo opened a tour in Bakersfield, California.

As a mixtape DJ and producer, he has released numerous projects, including the 2013 single "Skinny Ni**as" featuring Nipsey Hussle. That same year, he announced a debut mixtape with features from Nipsey Hussle, Joe Moses, and TeeFlii. XXL (magazine) described him as "The Most Popular underground DJ" in Los Angeles.

== Business career ==
Outside of performing, A-Tron has worked in entertainment marketing, collaborating with Fox Sports and the production collective 1500orNothin. In September 2013, he opened his online retail jewelry store, The Work Shop.
