= Don Bosco Technical Institute =

Location
- 1151 San Gabriel Boulevard; Rosemead, Los Angeles County, California 91770 USA; 34°2′30″N 118°5′13″W

Information
- Type: Private Catholic Co-Educational Secondary School
- Motto: "Developing Leaders in Science, Technology, Engineering, and Math"
- Religious affiliation: Roman Catholic (Salesian)
- Patron saint: St. John Bosco
- Established: September 12, 1955
- President: Guillermo Gutierrez
- Chairman: John Krakowski
- Principal: Jeff Krynen
- Teaching staff: 29.3 (on an FTE basis)
- Grades: 9–12
- Enrollment: 317 (2021–22)
- Student to teacher ratio: 10.8
- Campus size: 30 acres (120,000 m^{2})
- Colors: Black and Gold
- Athletics conference: CIF Southern Section; Santa Fe League
- Mascot: Tigers
- Nickname: Techmen
- Team name: Tigers
- Accreditation: Western Association of Schools and Colleges (WASC) & National Catholic Educational Association (NCEA)
- Publication: The Gear
- Tuition: $14,500 per year (2023-2024 school year)
- Website: https://boscotech.edu/

Don Bosco Technical Institute (commonly called "Bosco Tech" or "The Tech")(grades 9–12), private, Catholic high school in Rosemead, California, combining college-preparatory academic courses and technological education. The academic curriculum allows students to meet, or exceed, the admission requirements of the University of California, California State University and most other four-year colleges and universities throughout the country.

== Background ==
Don Bosco Technical Institute was established as a high school in 1954 through the cooperative efforts of the Roman Catholic Archdiocese of Los Angeles, the Salesian Society, as well as industrial and business leaders of the Greater Los Angeles Area.

Bosco Tech offers a wide variety of extracurricular activities as well as sports. The school is based on Catholic values, but students of any faith or religious persuasion may attend.

The school is located in the San Gabriel Valley, 10 mi (16 km) east of downtown Los Angeles, just north of the Pomona Freeway (SR 60) in the city of Rosemead, California. It occupies approximately thirty acres. At the time the school was founded the area was known as South San Gabriel. However, city borders around it have changed over the years, and it is now within Rosemead's boundaries.

=== Coeducation ===
On Tuesday, June 13, 2023, the Board of Trustees of the Don Bosco Technical Institute voted 12-1 in favor of continuing a path to provide a coeducational model of its program, which will begin no earlier than Fall of 2026.

Physical changes to the school have also been made, including the construction of a new bathroom and arrangements to accommodate incoming female freshmen during the annual freshmen retreat.

== Academics ==
Academically, the school sees other local Catholic schools (Loyola, La Salle, Crespi, St. Francis, Bishop Amat, Serra, Cantwell Sacred Heart of Mary, and Cathedral) as peers. It is also close in proximity to two other Salesian-based high schools, Bishop Mora Salesian in Boyle Heights and St. John Bosco in Bellflower. Bosco Tech's students come from all over the Greater Los Angeles area, with some students traveling more than an hour's commute each day to the school.

Bosco Tech offers 5 Honors and 17 Advanced Placement (AP) classes from freshman to senior year.

Advanced Placement (AP) courses at Bosco Tech include:

- Biology
- Calculus AB
- Calculus BC
- Chemistry
- Computer Science Principles
- Computer Science A
- Cybersecurity
- English Language and Composition
- English Literature and Composition
- Environmental Science
- Human Geography
- Macroeconomics
- Physics C: Mechanics
- Spanish Language and Culture
- Spanish Literature and Culture
- Statistics
- United States Government and Politics
- United States History

Honors courses at Bosco Tech include:

- Biology
- Chemistry
- English 1–2
- English 3–4
- World History

=== Technology ===
In addition to the academic program, all students are required to participate in the school's pre-engineering/technology program and declare a major in one of six technology fields, previously known as shops:

- ACE — Architecture and Construction Engineering (Formerly known as Cabinetmaking shop)
- BMET — Biological, Medical, and Environmental Technology (Established in 2018)
- CSEE — Computer Science and Electrical Engineering (Formerly known as Electronics, established in 1957)
- IDEA — Integrated Design, Engineering and Art
- MAT — Media Arts and Technology (Formerly known as Photo-Offset Printing)
- MSET — Materials Science, Engineering and Technology (Formerly known as Practical Metallurgy)
- Auto Mechanics Shop (Closed in 2010)
- Machine Shop (Closed in 2010, but is distinct from the now modern tech IDEA)

All incoming freshmen are required to attend a mandatory 2-week summer program prior to their ninth-grade year, where the students can experience all of the six technology majors. This program helps them make an informed decision on the three techs they rotate through in the fall semester of their freshmen year.

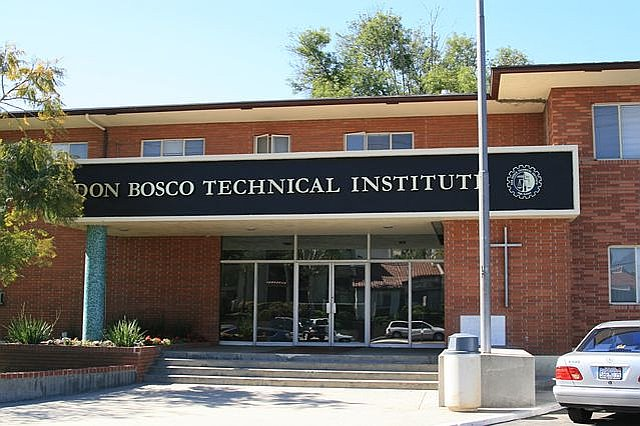
Administration Building, visible from the front of the school

In the fall semester, the freshmen enroll in three, six-week introductory technology courses chosen from the school's six technology departments. After their first semester of study, freshman students will select a technology major. They will remain in that major for the duration of their ninth-grade year and for the proceeding three years. The sequential nature of the technology coursework makes it difficult for transfer students after the tenth grade and will require all transfer students to complete summer coursework.

== Athletics ==
The athletic teams participate in the Camino Real League and the Del Rey League. The school's rivals are Mary Star of the Sea, Cantwell Sacred Heart of Mary, and La Salle High School.

The Athletic Program at Bosco Tech consists of:

- Baseball
- Basketball
- Cross Country
- Football
- Golf
- Soccer
- Tennis
- Track & Field
- Volleyball

== Student life ==
=== Clubs and organizations ===
Since the founding of the school, it has offered a variety of diverse student organizations and clubs. The school has been recognized for its renowned speech and debate team, which has competed and placed successfully in local and national tournaments, even though it is mainly composed of underclassmen. For the first time in the school's history, it sent a Public Forum Debate Team to the National Championships held in June 2008 in Las Vegas, Nevada, composed of juniors.

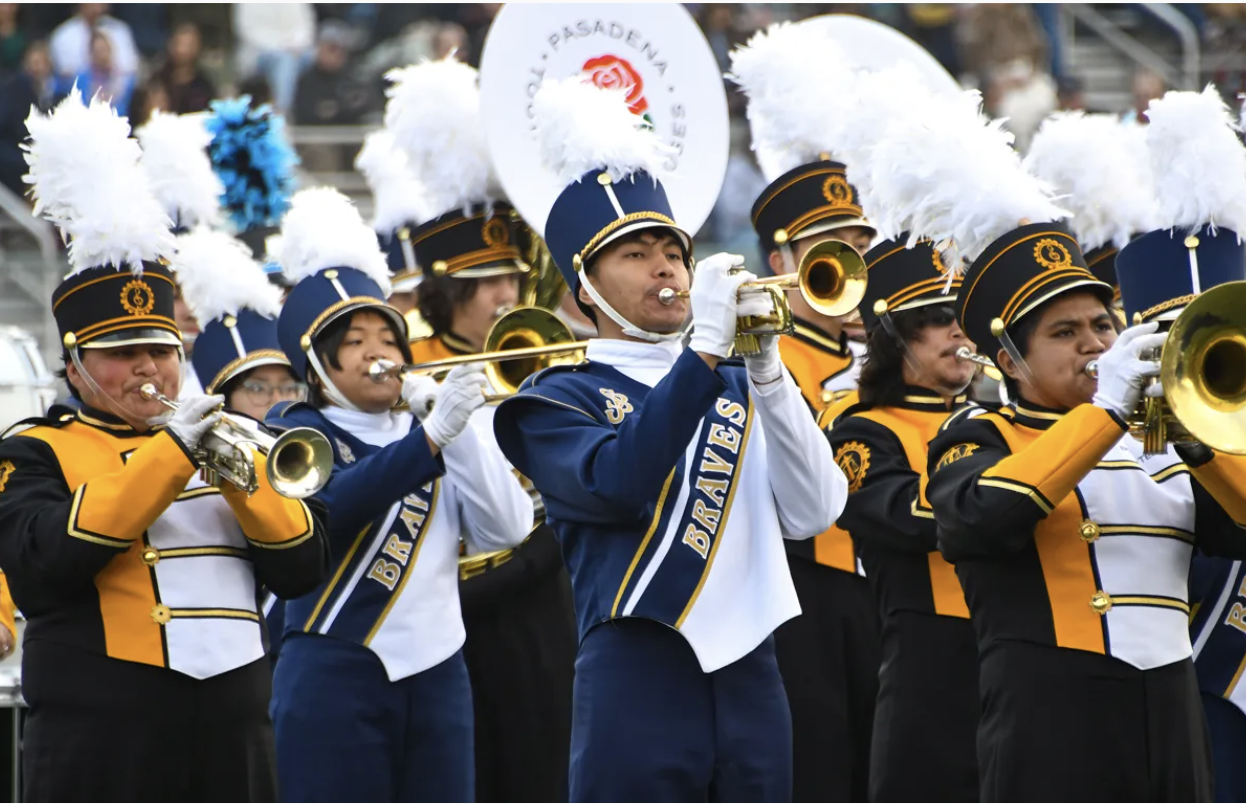
Salesians of Don Bosco Marching Band At Bandfest 2025. Photo courtesy of Pasadena Star News.

The school also has a special relationship with its "sister schools": Ramona Convent in Alhambra, San Gabriel Mission High School in San Gabriel, and Alverno in Sierra Madre. The schools participate in several activities and organizations together:

- The Bosco Tech Yell, Cheer, Pep flags, and Mascot programs
- The yearly March for Hunger – a 26 mi (42 km) walk from Salazar Park in Los Angeles to Santa Monica Beach to raise money for the Los Angeles Catholic Worker's Hospitality Kitchen with Ramona Convent, Damien High School from La Verne, California and St. Paul High School from Santa Fe Springs, California
- As of the 2019–2020 school year, Bosco Tech's music program and the FRC robotics club now take in students from sister schools to participate.

=== Music program ===
A 90-member Bosco Tech Royal Techmen Marching Band and Pageantry in a 1970s Arcadia Band Review.

The music program at Bosco Tech consists of:

- Marching band
- Wind ensemble
- Percussion ensemble
- Jazz band
- Jazz Honor band
- Music Appreciation

Music education was emphasized as one of the main focuses of Don Bosco's educational approach. Therefore, since the school's birth in 1955, the "Bosco Tech Royal Techmen Marching Band" became the school's first and oldest extracurricular activity. Bosco Tech's music program was founded in 1957. Its most famous band director was Brother Eugene Burns, who directed the band from 1957 to 1978. In the 1970–1971 season, the auxiliary units were formed by San Gabriel Mission only until 1980s, when girls from Ramona Convent joined the units. The band had marched 70+ members in the 1970s, but, in recent years, band membership has averaged 35–40 members. Despite its relatively small size, the marching band and the auxiliary units have scored high points in their division annually.

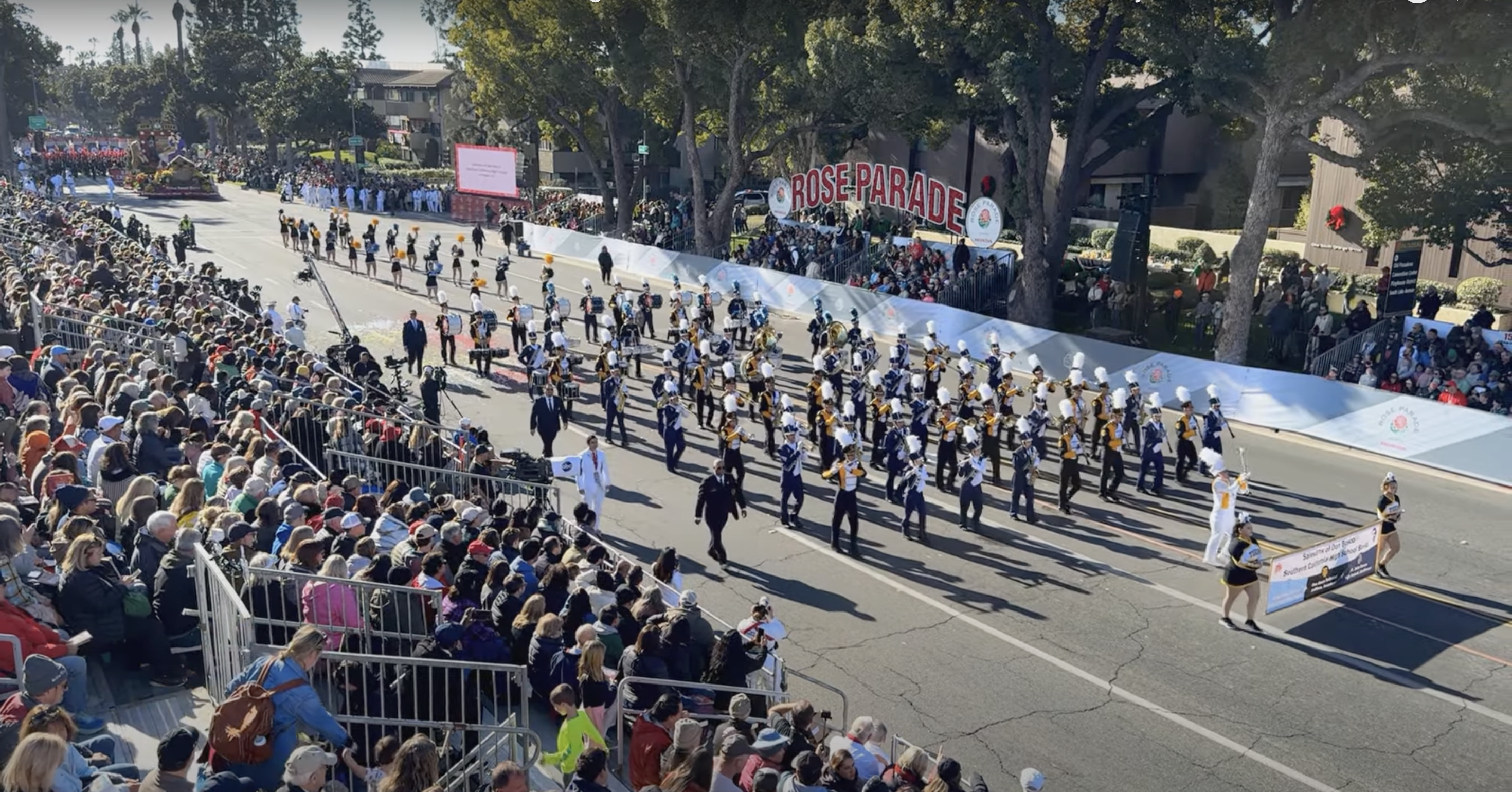
The Salesians of Don Bosco Southern California High School Marching Band performing in the 2025 Rose Parade, showcasing their unity, precision, and musical excellence along the historic parade route.

The marching band is known throughout the state as "the band with the cannon". Its trademark cannon, made on the school premises, was fired and pulled by two students in front of the band during band reviews and parades in various Southern California cities, such as Arcadia, Temple City, Long Beach, Montebello, Azusa and San Francisco. The band has also appeared in the Los Angeles County Fair, a University of Southern California football game, the California 500 Speedway in Ontario, Disneyland's "America on Parade", Dodger Stadium, San Francisco's Columbus Day Parade, the Hawaii Invitational Music Festival, the Kennedy Space Center, Sea World San Diego and Universal Studios Florida.

During the Winter of the 2017–18 school year, the band's membership grew to 48 members. During this time there were more students involved in the band than the football team.

The next year, in the 2018–19 school year, the band opened its registration to its sister schools: San Gabriel Mission and Ramona Convent, as those schools did not have proper music programs. For the first time in 61 years, the Bosco Tech Music Program features players of both genders.

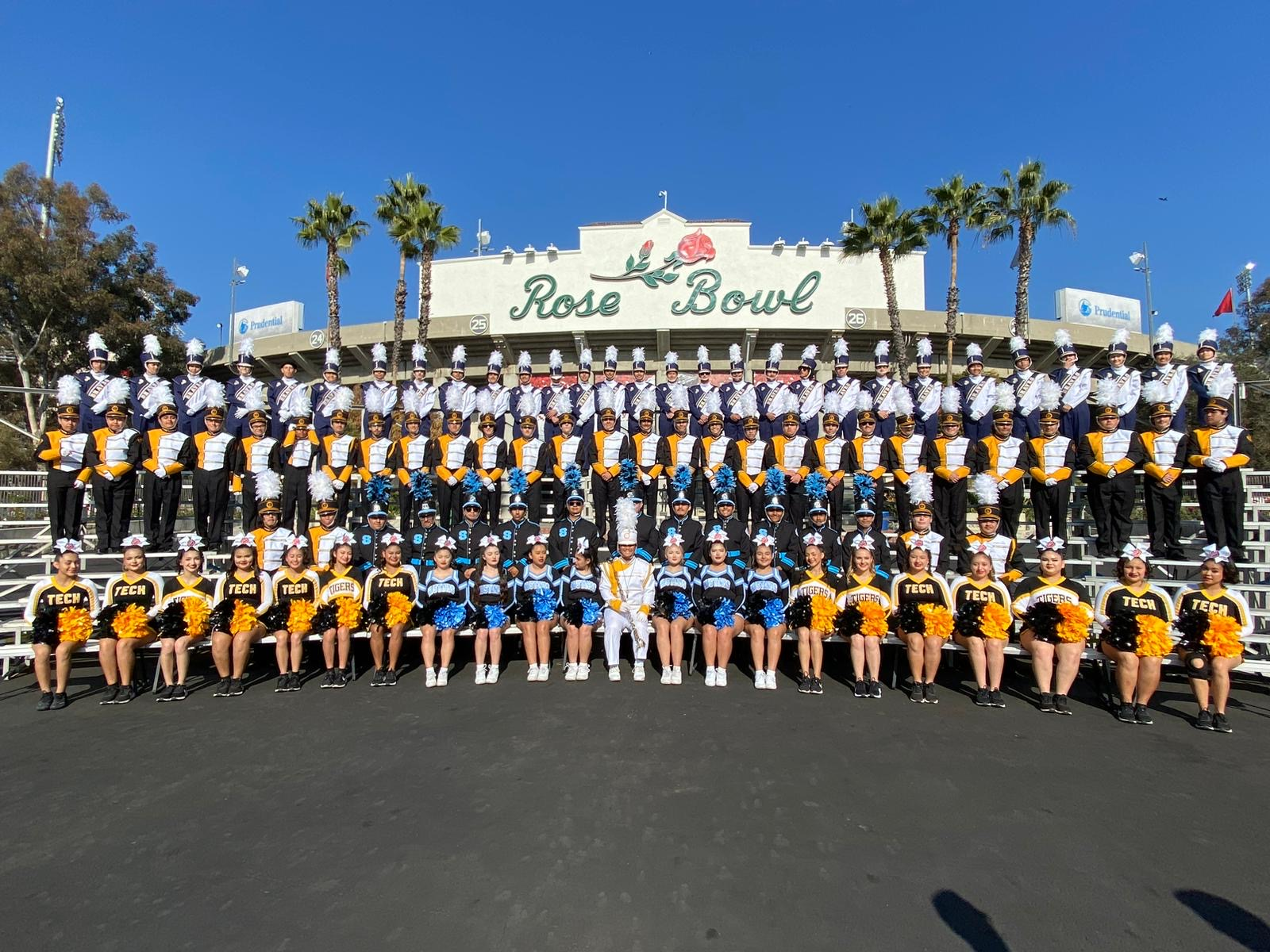
Salesians of Don Bosco Southern California High School Band posing in front of the Rose Bowl before marching in the 2025 Rose Parade

In the 2024–25 school year, the Bosco Tech Band partnered with marching bands from Salesian High School and St. John Bosco High School, along with cheer and auxiliary squads from their sister schools, to form the Salesians of Don Bosco Southern California High School Marching Band under the direction of Bosco Tech's band director and professional jazz musician, Sam Hankins. This composite band swelled to over 110 members and participated at major events, including the Montebello Heritage Day Parade, where they earned 1st place in band, cheer, and drum major; the Northeast LA Veteran's Parade; and the Rose Parade Bandfest. Their marching season culminated in a performance in the Rose Parade.

=== Culture ===
- One of the school's original cheers celebrated the inherent "geek" status of the students at a technical high school.

Secant, tangent, cosine, sine
Three point one four, one five nine
Slide rule, slide rule, sis boom bah
Bosco Tech, beat them raw!

- In 1975, Bosco Tech paid $200 to the then "garage-band" Van Halen to perform at a campus music show.
- The Black Eyed Peas performed at Bosco Tech's end-of-year dance in 2001
- The Black Eyed Peas also filmed the music video for their song "Big Love" during the summer of 2018 at Bosco Tech.
- The current mascot, the Tiger, was adopted after a student vote in 1986. The historic mascot of the school is the "Techman."
- The school has one of the oldest high school Kairos retreat programs in Southern California. Students have been going to the retreat since the 1980s.
- The well-known incident among the school and its peers, “600 activities”, definition may be found on the Urban Dictionary
- The “Bosco Tech Brotherhood” is a fundamental part of the school as it is implemented from The Royale Techmen Marching Band, to the freshmen retreats that are held annually.

== Salesian Spirit Games ==
Twice a school year, during fall and spring, Bosco Tech's students participate in the Salesian Spirit Games, where the 6 technologies compete against each other in different sports. Each grade level is given a sport to compete in. The sport each grade level competes in is determined year to year, however the sports are chosen by the grade level student governments with seniors getting first pick.

The winner of the Salesian Spirit Games is awarded the Salesian Cup. In addition to sports, the 6 technologies compete for spirit. The Tech with the most spirit displayed throughout the games wins the Spirit Cup.

== Notable alumni ==
- Paul Crespo, media commentator
- Wayne Engelstad, former NBA player for the Denver Nuggets
- Michael Garciaparra, former professional baseball player
- Jose Luis Gonzalez, founder of Goez Art Studio, 1969, the first Chicano arts organization that was developed to promote the work of Chicano artists
- Ken Gushi, professional drift car racer (attended, but did not graduate)
- Jay Hernandez, actor (attended, but did not graduate)
- Josh Lakatos, former Olympic target shooter and semi-professional Quarter Midget race car driver
- Alex Meruelo, owner of the Arizona Coyotes
- Michael Trevino, actor

== See also ==
- St. John Bosco High School
- Ramona Convent Secondary School
