= Paul Crespo =

Political consultant in the United States

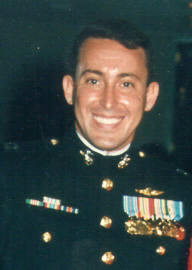
- Crespo circa 1995
- Born: June 8, 1964 (age 61); Los Angeles, California
- Education: Georgetown University, (B.A. in International Politics), King's College London (M.A. in War Studies), Cambridge University, (M.Phil. in International Relations),
- Known for: Conservative commentator and activist, former Univision (Spanish) radio host and retired U.S. Marine Corps Captain
- Political party: Republican
- Awards: DIA Joint Service Achievement Medal (JSAM), DIA Joint Service Commendation Medal (JCOM)
- Website: paulcrespo.com

Paul Crespo (born June 8, 1964) is a conservative political commentator, consultant and activist. A former captain in the U.S. Marine Corps, he has had a varied military and civilian career, and gained notoriety for his strong political opinions. He is best known for his conservative and free market views and passion for the constitutional and founding principles of the United States of America.

== Early life and education ==
Crespo was born in Los Angeles, California to Luis and Elsa Crespo, Cuban exiles who fled Cuba in the early 1960s. Crespo attended Catholic grammar school, Don Bosco Technical Institute and later went on to graduate from the Georgetown University School of Foreign Service in Washington, D.C., with a bachelor's degree in international politics. He also has a master's degree in war studies from King's College London and a master's degree in international relations from Cambridge University in the United Kingdom.

== Military career ==
Crespo served as an artillery and intelligence officer in the U.S. Marine Corps for 12 years, on both active duty and in the Reserves, receiving an honorable discharge (honorary retirement) as a captain in 1998. He served in numerous countries on four continents in artillery, infantry and airborne units, and spent six months aboard a helicopter assault ship in the Far East as part of a Marine Expeditionary Unit—Special Operations Capable (MEU-SOC). Assigned to the Defense Intelligence Agency (DIA), he was posted in a diplomatic capacity (military attaché) at several U.S. embassies in the Balkans, Middle East and Latin America. There Captain Crespo served as Acting U.S. Naval Attaché in Croatia, U.S. Defense Attaché Liaison in Qatar, and Assistant U.S. Naval Attaché in Venezuela.

During his service he earned numerous awards and distinctions including a DIA Joint Service Achievement Medal (JSAM), a DIA Joint Service Commendation Medal (JCOM), and various letters of commendation. Crespo later returned to the Pentagon as a consultant, working between 2007 and 2009 as a senior manager developing, launching and managing a major media project for the U.S. Southern Command in Miami, Florida.

== Conservative media personality ==
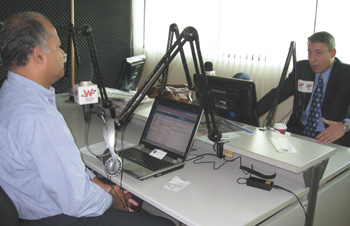
Paul Crespo speaking on radio

Paul Crespo authored a regular column on politics, military affairs and diplomacy for The Miami Herald, and served on that paper's editorial board as a conservative editorial writer. Additionally, he has written extensively for other venues such as Newsmax Magazine, American Legion Magazine and The Washington Times. He also co-hosted a daily, Spanish-language political talk show for Univision Radio where he was the conservative counterpoint to his liberal co-host.

Crespo has appeared nationally and internationally on CNN, Fox News, Sky News, Telemundo and Univision, as well as on numerous local TV network outlets as an expert on U.S. politics, national security and international affairs. In 2003, he was the on-air military analyst for the local WSVN 7 TV news (Fox affiliate) in Miami during the Iraq War.

In 2003, Crespo received a Robert Novak Journalism Fellowship from the Phillips Foundation.

== Community involvement ==
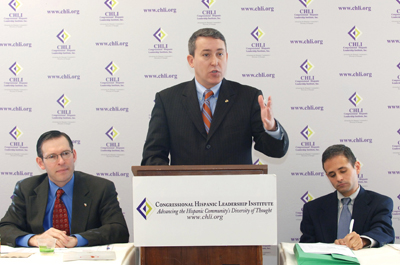
Crespo speaks at the Congressional Hispanic Leadership Institute's (CHLI) "Future leaders Conference" in 2008

Crespo was a lecturer in the political science department at the University of Miami where he taught U.S. politics with a focus on the U.S. Constitution and American founding principles, as well as comparative world politics. He was also an election expert at the University of Miami. Crespo is founder and president of Civica Americana (Hispanic-American Civics Foundation), a non-profit organization that "promotes American values, heritage, citizenship and constitutional and free-market principles in the Hispanic community as well as in Latin America."

Between 2005 and 2007, he served on the Board of Directors, and was the project director for, the new Bay of Pigs Museum project, helping to launch an effort to build a new Bay of Pigs Museum to honor those who fought to try to liberate Cuba from communism.

== Professional experience ==
Crespo is the managing director of SPECTRE Global Risk, LLC, President of the Center for American Defense Studies (CADS), and Managing Editor of American Defense News He previously worked as a senior advisor at Raptor Strategies, a boutique public relations and public affairs firm based in Washington, D.C. and as a senior consultant, Alhambra Investment Partners, money management and investment firm based in Coral Gables, Florida.

After his retirement from the U.S. Marine Corps, Crespo worked as International Security Consultant and Kidnap and Ransom negotiator with Ackerman Group in Miami and as an investment advisor/broker with Lehman Brothers in New York City, New York.

== Republican Party activist ==
Crespo has been active with various Republican Party political campaigns in South Florida and elsewhere. During the 2000 George W. Bush presidential campaign, he founded and co-chaired the South Florida Young Professionals for Bush (YP4W) and later was part of the Bush/GOP Florida Recount Team, where among other things he ensured the absentee military vote was properly counted. In 2004, Crespo was the South Florida Media Coordinator for the George W. Bush re-election campaign, serving as one of the Bush campaign's primary on-air media surrogates in both Spanish and English languages.

== Political campaigns ==
Crespo ran twice unsuccessfully for public office first in 2010 for U.S. Congress in Florida's District 25 and later in 2012 for Florida House of Representatives in District 105. Crespo's campaign themes highlighted his service as a U.S. Marine Corps officer and his role as the outsider in this race running against a career, machine politician. He stated his belief in the concept of "citizen legislators" and while running for U.S. Congress pledged to term limit himself to eight years and to not accept nor participate in the generous Congressional pension plan, stating, "If your 401k retirement account tanks because of a bad economy your Congressman should be in the same boat."

These experiences involved Crespo in controversies that established him as the anti-corruption candidate and as an activist against absentee ballot abuse in Florida.

== Controversies ==
While running for U.S. Congress, Crespo called on the resignation of then Miami-Dade County Republican Party Chairman and now disgraced former Congressman David Rivera for abusing his Party chairmanship, conflicts of interest and questionable fundraising methods (which later developed into ethics complaints and criminal investigations). For his effort, Crespo was involved in a notorious episode of political intimidation by the Miami Dade GOP leadership against Crespo which was caught on video as Miami-Dade County Republican Executive Director ordered off-duty police to remove Crespo from the podium and eventually out of the meeting altogether. Complaints by Crespo's campaign were filed a complaint with the City of West Miami Police Department and to the U.S. Attorney's office for possible federal civil rights violations and harassment by Rivera's staff against a candidate for federal office.

In 2010, Crespo made controversial remarks in an op-ed titled "Absentee vote fraud destroying Miami-Dade elections". Crespo alleged there were voting irregularities and a conspiracy to steal hundreds of votes in the City of Sweetwater that went to his political opponent through the abuse of absentee ballots. This event transformed Crespo into an electoral reform advocate, who later joined the Florida Advisory Committee to the U.S. Commission on Civil Rights in Washington, D.C.

== Affiliations ==
Prior to his run for U.S. Congress, Paul Crespo was an adjunct fellow with the Foundation for Defense of Democracies. He is a member of the International Institute for Strategic Studies (IISS) (UK); and the Council on Emerging National Security Affairs (CENSA) in Washington, D.C.

Crespo is a member of the National Press Club, as well as other organizations such as the Oxford and Cambridge Club, the Army and Navy Club, the Diplomatic and Consular Officers Retired (DACOR) organization.
