= Neal King =

American educator, writer, consultant and psychologist

Neal King, is a retired American educator, writer, consultant and psychologist. He is president-emeritus, and former chair of the board of directors, of the International Association of University Presidents. He is also president emeritus of Antioch University Los Angeles and Sofia University in Palo Alto, California.

In 2013, Caucasus University, in Tbilisi, Georgia, awarded King its Doctor Honoris Causa in recognition of his leadership in international higher education.

== Early life and education ==
King is the son of a career US Navy officer; the family moved frequently during his childhood. He graduated from Fermin Lasuen High School in San Pedro, Los Angeles, California, where he was student body president.

He earned a B.A. in English from St. Mary's College of California in 1968, where he was class and student body president.

In 1970, he briefly attended a music school, Ecole de Musique, in Nice, France.

He earned an M.A. and a Ph.D. (1985) in counseling psychology from the University of California, Berkeley.

== Career ==
King was a conscientious objector during the Vietnam War. As his alternate service, he served as Director of the Lao American Association in Pakse, Laos from 1969 to 1970 and as an English language teacher at Lycee Amirouche in Tizi Ouzou, Algeria from 1970 to 1971. He is a lifelong pacifist.

King served as a counselor at the American School in London from 1977 to 1980.

After completing his graduate education at UC Berkeley, King became a faculty member of the masters program in Counseling at Sonoma State University, in 1987, where he was a lecturer until 1992.

King was a professor of psychology and the founding director of the Doctor of Psychology program at John F. Kennedy University in Pleasant Hill, California (1992–1997).

King was the founding Associate Dean of Argosy University Phoenix (1997–1999) and founding campus President of Argosy University's / University of Sarasota campus in Orange County California (1999–2001). (Argosy University is now defunct.)

From 2001 to 2004, King served as Provost and Vice President for Academic Affairs at Rocky Mountain College of Art and Design in Colorado, where he led the successful drive for initial accreditation with the National Association of Schools of Art and Design (NASAD).

In 2004, he became the academic dean, and later interim president, at Antioch University New England.

Later, as president of Antioch University Los Angeles (2006–2011) he transformed a $1M deficit into a $7M surplus in five years, and oversaw the development of a new master's program in Urban Sustainability.

King has written about AIDS/HIV.

He is the author of Speaking Our Truth: Voices of Courage and Healing for Male Survivors of Childhood Sexual Abuse, published in 1995 by Harper Perennial. King is also co-editor of Strategies for University Management Volumes I & II, Business Expert Press, 2016. In 2024, Dr. King's memoir "Trauma is a Thief" was published by Halo Publishing International.

=== Antioch University ===
King served at Antioch University from 2004 to 2011. In 2004, he became the first Academic Dean, and later Interim President, at Antioch University New England. Continuing his work at Antioch University Los Angeles from 2006 to 2011, King was the first President of a separate campus apart from the Santa Barbara campus. There he oversaw a "transition from significant deficit to significant surplus in 5 years, built the first Board of Trustees for the campus and oversaw the development of a new MA in Sustainability." King served on both the University Leadership Council (ULC) and the Antioch University Bold Future Initiative Task Force with members from many different schools within Antioch. In particular the task force drew upon the help of individuals at Antioch University and King's university Antioch Los Angeles and his former university, Antioch New England:

=== Sofia University ===
From 2011 to 2014, King served as president at Sofia University (California) (formerly known as The Institute of Transpersonal Psychology) in Palo Alto, California. During his tenure at the university King reports, "he took steps in concert with the community to realize the strategic directions established by the board and endorsed by the community." These included changing the name to reflect it was a university, introducing an undergraduate degree program with WASC oversight, as well as "professionalizing the staff", and completing a re-branding process - which was opposed by some in the community.

King and several board members resigned effective January 2014 due to lack of a functional governance system at the school. These resignations also followed a reported vote of "no confidence" from Sofia's faculty, after an enrollment shortfall necessitated laying off 12 faculty and staff.

The school was acquired by private investors in 2014 and became a for-profit institution.

=== Affiliations ===
King served as a team chair and member of the Eligibility Review Committee (ERC) for the senior commission of Western Association of Schools and Colleges (WASC). The ERC is tasked with conducting reviews on institutions applying for WASC accreditation.

King was president and a member (and chair) of the board of directors and executive committee of the International Association of University Presidents (IAUP).

He was also a member of the Multi-Stakeholder Advisory Group for the Economic and Social Council (ECOSOC) of the United Nations, and a charter member of the Board of Directors of the World University Consortium, where he represented IAUP.

In 2010, King became a founding member of LGBTQ Presidents in Higher Education, which according to their webpage "advances effective leadership in the realm of post-secondary education, supports professional development of LGBTQ leaders in that sector, and provides education and advocacy regarding LGBTQ issues within the global academy and for the public at large."
King also served on the executive board of California Campus Compact (CACC) from 2009 to 2014. He joined the CACC as president of Antioch University Los Angeles and later facilitated membership for The Institute of Transpersonal Psychology, now called Sofia University (California). He had previously served on the Board of Campus Compact New Hampshire, while interim president of Antioch University New England.

== Personal life ==
King married Peter Morrison in August 2008, during the five-month window of legal same-sex marriages in California, preceding the passage of Prop 8.
