= Sacred Heart High School (California) =

Private school in Los Angeles

Location
- 2111 North Griffin Avenue; Los Angeles (Lincoln Heights), (Los Angeles County), California 90031; United States; 34°4′12″N 118°12′43″W

Information
- Type: Private
- Motto: Veritas (Truth)
- Religious affiliation: Roman Catholic
- Patron saint: Sacred Heart of Jesus
- Established: 1907
- Founder: Mother Pia Backes
- Oversight: Archdiocese of Los Angeles
- Dean: Lisa Cagigas
- Principal: Raymond Saborio
- Grades: 9-12
- Gender: Girls
- Colors: Red and White
- Athletics conference: CIF Southern Section (Horizon League)
- Mascot: Comets
- Team name: Comets
- Rival: Bishop Conaty
- Accreditation: Western Association of Schools and Colleges
- Affiliation: Dominican Sisters of Mission San Jose
- Alumni: Elisa Reynaga
- Admissions Director: Wendy Navarro
- Athletic Director: Andrew Gatti
- Activities Director: Jennifer Beltran
- Website: www.shhsla.org
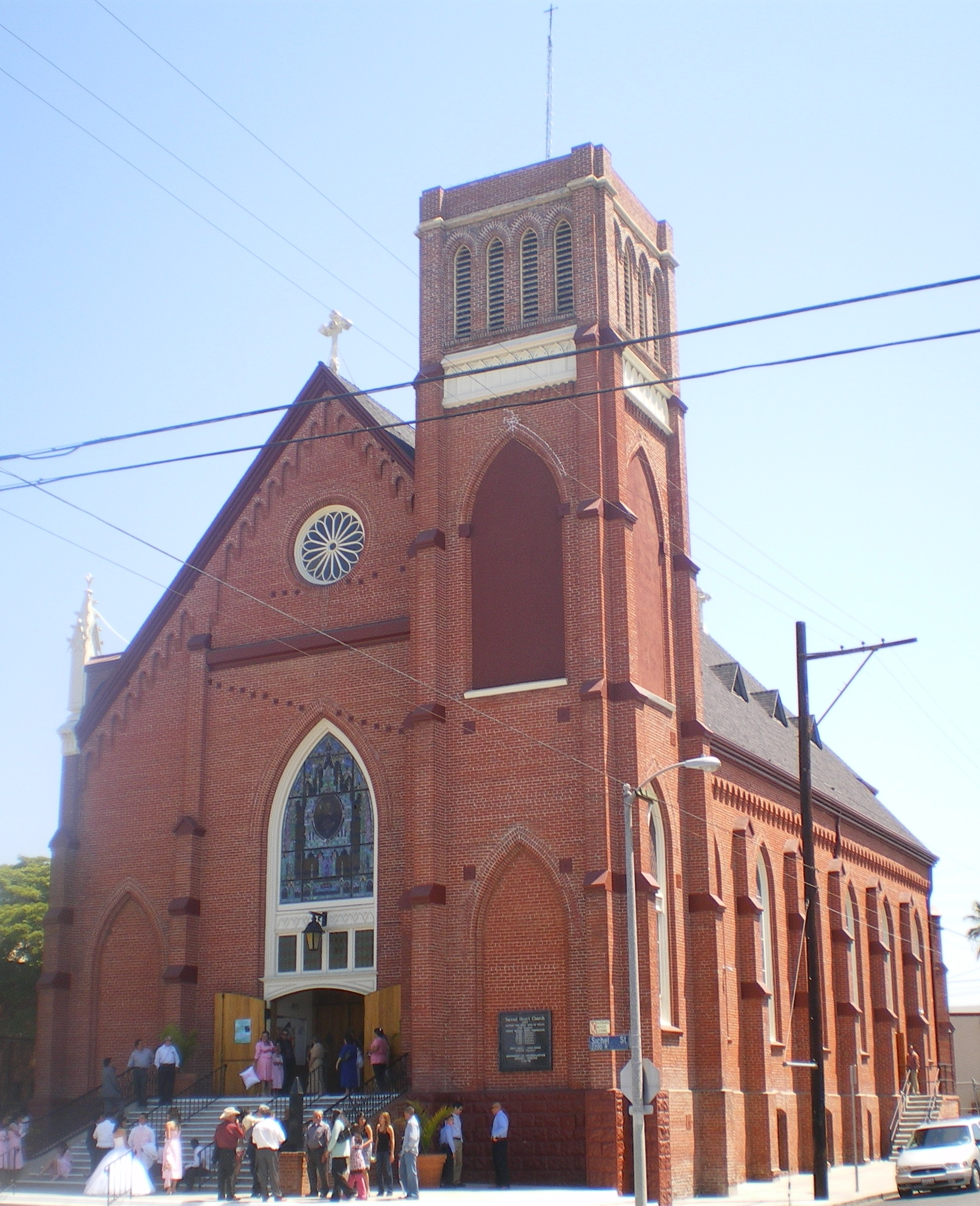

Sacred Heart High School is a Roman Catholic high school for girls in the Lincoln Heights neighborhood of Los Angeles, California. Located in the Roman Catholic Archdiocese of Los Angeles, the school was founded by the Dominican Sisters of Mission San Jose in 1907. The school is named after the most holy Sacred Heart of Jesus.

== History ==
Sacred Heart Academy was founded in 1907, one of the first girls' high schools founded in the Archdiocese of Los Angeles. The Dominican Sisters of Mission San Jose had already established an elementary school in 1890 when they were asked to open a high school. The De La Salle Brothers taught the younger boys until 1925 when Cathedral High School was opened. In 1949 Sacred Heart Academy became Sacred Heart High School and was placed under the jurisdiction of the Sacred Heart Parish. In 1979 it became an Archdiocesan school.
