= St. Pius X - St. Matthias Academy =

Private school in Downey, California, United States

Location
- 7851 Gardendale Street; Downey, (Los Angeles County), California 90242; United States
- 33°55′9″N 118°9′36″W

Information
- Type: Private, Coeducational
- Religious affiliation: Roman Catholic
- Patron saints: St. Pius X and St. Matthias
- Established: 2013
- Oversight: Archdiocese of Los Angeles
- Superintendent: Paul Escala
- President: Dr. Christian De Larkin
- Principal: Claudia Rodarte
- Grades: 9-12
- Average class size: 24
- Student to teacher ratio: 15:1
- Colors: Crimson Red and Grey
- Athletics conference: CIF Southern Section; Del Rey League
- Nickname: Warriors
- Accreditation: Western Association of Schools and Colleges
- Newspaper: The Warrior Pride
- Tuition: $12300
- Website: www.piusmatthias.org

St. Pius X - St. Matthias Academy is a coeducational private, Catholic high school for grades 9–12 located in Downey, California. It is operated by the Roman Catholic Archdiocese of Los Angeles and accredited by the Western Association of Schools and Colleges and the Western Catholic Educational Association

== History ==
St. Pius X-St. Matthias Academy was born from two great traditions of Catholic Education in the Archdiocese of Los Angeles- Pius X High School (1953-1998) and St. Matthias High School (1963-2013). In the year 1953, the Archdiocese of Los Angeles launched Pius X High School which served a co-ed population from the southeast area of Los Angeles County. The campus was home to Pius X High School from 1953 until the Archdiocese of Los Angeles announced a school realignment transforming the co-ed Pius X High School, into a consolidation with the all-girls St. Matthias High School, eventually phasing out the Pius X program over a three-year period. About 80% of St. Matthias' all-girls student body of 300 transferred to Pius X campus. This resulted in a larger all-girl Catholic high school located on the sprawling 15-acre Pius X campus which became known as St. Matthias High School for Girls.

=== Pius X High School ===
Pius X High School (Pius X) was a co-educational, private, four-year (grade levels 9–12) high school. Named for Pope Pius X, it was founded in 1954. The present campus of St. Pius X - St. Matthias Academy on Gardendale Street is Pius X's campus.

Fr. James W. Keefe was named principal in 1967, and the following year, instituted a concept of modern teaching, the Model School Project. Pius employed an educational model called "non-gradedness," which placed a student in a class where his or her present achievement was the deciding factor. Emphasis was put on progress and learning by the individual. The plan was discontinued after Keefe left in 1975.

Declining enrollment from the 1980s onward placed financial pressure on the Archdiocese's high schools, prompting Pius X to begin fundraisers and to form a new alumni association in 1986. A 25 percent drop in enrollment in 1992 prompted drastic cost-cutting, including the firing of two coaches and the elimination of many sports.

=== St. Matthias High School ===
A school was first established at Stafford Avenue and Belgrade Street in Huntington Park in 1926, to serve as the parochial school of the parish of St. Matthias, where Msgr. Patrick Shear was pastor. It was leveled in the 1933 Long Beach earthquake and rebuilt, then converted to St. Matthias High School in 1960. It was staffed by the Sisters of Notre Dame.

St. Matthias High School was recognized as a Blue Ribbon School of Excellence by the United States Department of Education in May 2002 and was accredited by the Western Association of Schools and Colleges and the Western Catholic Education Association. St. Matthias had a well-regarded fine-arts department, producing highly acclaimed productions in theater, music and art. Actress Sabrina Le Beauf was a 1976 graduate.

=== Merger ===
In early 1995, the Archdiocese of Los Angeles announced a school realignment that would make the Pius X campus co-institutional with the all-girl St. Matthias High School. The Pius X program was to be phased out over a three-year period, leaving the institution an all-girls school.

The merger plan was met with opposition from students, parents, teachers and civic leaders alike. Pius X students staged a walkout in February 1995 to protest the decision to make the school single-sex, and students, parents and teachers from St. Matthias staged their own protest against the closure of the Huntington Park campus. The plan proceeded, but the school continued to operate under capacity. In 2011, the St. Matthias Advisory Board and the Archdiocese asked Loyola Marymount University's Center for Catholic Education to conduct a detailed study on options for St. Matthias. The Center for Catholic Education study looked at how the school was achieving their Catholic education mission. It was decided to convert the facility back to a co-ed school, and the name St. Pius X - St. Matthias Academy was chosen to honor the traditions of both institutions.

St. Pius X-St. Matthias Academy or PMA as it is known among the community, serves a co-ed population of approximately 400 students from diverse economic and cultural backgrounds. It recently announced plans to begin work on the first phase of the PMA Campus Master plan that was completed in the Spring 2017.

== Athletics ==
St. Pius X - St. Matthias Academy competes with other southeastern Los Angeles County Catholic schools in the Del Rey League, in the CIF Southern Section. As of 2022, they field teams in cheerleading, cross country, volleyball, football, soccer, basketball, track & field, baseball, and softball.
