= St. Bernard High School (Los Angeles) =

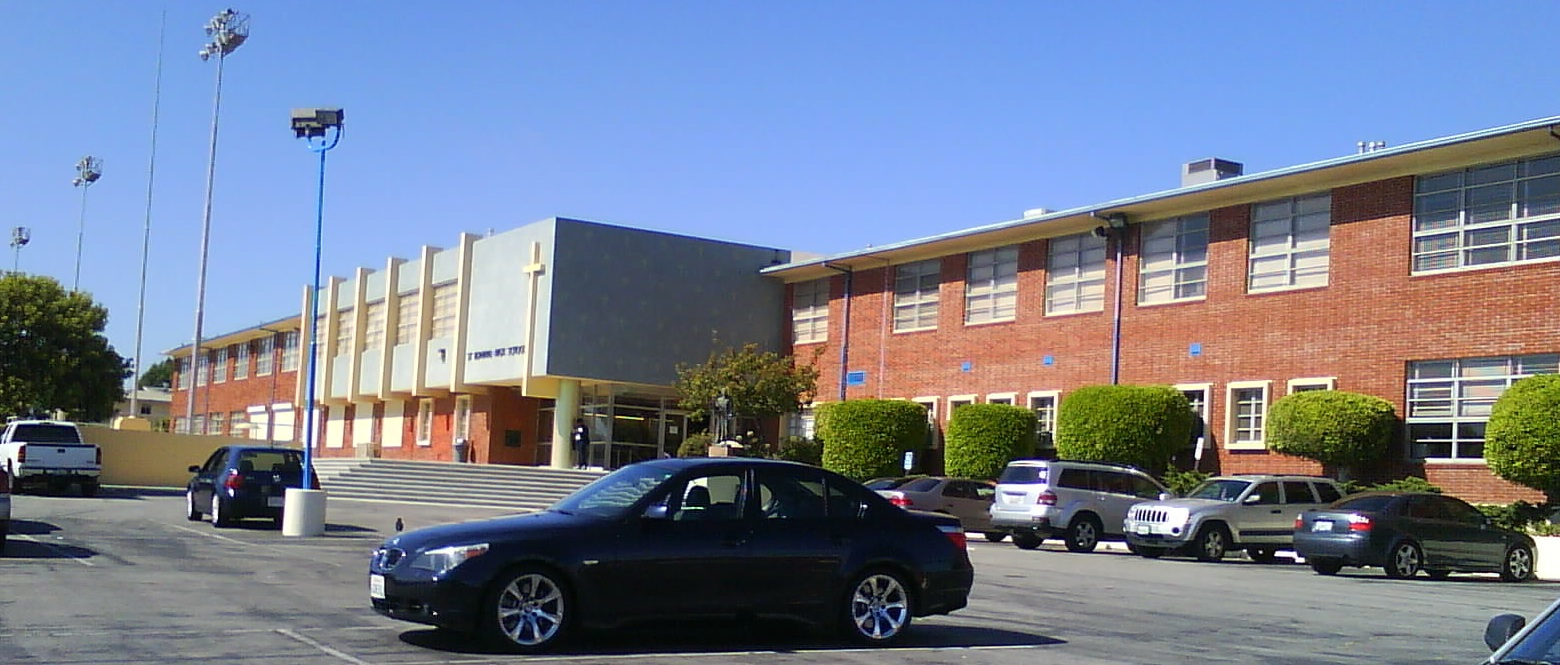

Location
- 9100 Falmouth Avenue; Los Angeles, California 90293-8205; United States; 33°57′15″N 118°25′57″W

Information
- Type: Private
- Motto: Noverim Te, Noverim Me (If I will have known you, (O God), I will have known myself.)
- Religious affiliation: Roman Catholic
- Patron saint: St. Bernard of Clairvaux
- Established: 1957; 69 years ago
- CEEB code: 052487
- President: Casey Yeazel
- Principal: Austin Jackson
- Faculty: 25
- Teaching staff: 17
- Grades: 9–12
- Gender: Coeducational
- Enrollment: 200 (2025)
- Average class size: 11
- Student to teacher ratio: 11:1
- Campus size: 14 acres
- Colors: Blue, white, and gold
- Slogan: Empowering Hearts, Igniting Minds, Building Leaders
- Athletics: 14 co-ed sports, including basketball and track and field
- Athletics conference: CIF Southern Section; Santa Fe League
- Mascot: Viking
- Nickname: Vikings
- Accreditation: Western Association of Schools and Colleges
- Newspaper: The Odyssey; The Knarr
- Yearbook: The Voyager
- Tuition: $12,500 (2024-2025)
- Website: stbernardhs.org

St. Bernard High School is a four-year coeducational Catholic high school located in Playa Del Rey, California, which is in the West Los Angeles area. The school is located next to the Los Angeles International Airport, across from Westchester High School. The school was founded in 1957. It is located within the Roman Catholic Archdiocese of Los Angeles.

== Events ==
Plans for St. Bernard High School were begun in 1955, in response to the need for high schools in the Westchester–Playa del Rey area. Classes were held for one year at the St. Anastasia School while the present campus was being completed. On December 4, 1957, a ceremony blessed the present site.

During the 2007 and 2008 school years, the school added new computers for teachers and students. In the 2008/09 school year, a state-of-the-art video production studio was added. An Academic Success Class was developed in 2008 to ensure academic achievement for students that seem to have fallen behind in their studies. In the fall of 2008, Academic Coach training was provided to over 30 qualified juniors and seniors. The Academic Coaches work with students one-on-one and in teams during the Academic Success Class. In addition, teachers post assignments and syllabi on the school's online portal, allowing parents to access the site from any computer.

In June 2009, the school hired a new principal, Mike Alvarez, a former principal of St. John Bosco High School.

The 51st Graduation ceremony was held, on June 3, 2011 at The Cathedral of Our Lady of the Angels, in light of the Class of 1961's 50th class jubilee reunion. Seventy percent of St. Bernard's 2011 graduates were accepted to four-year universities, and ninety eight percent of the class went on to attend higher learning institutes.

Enrollment had doubled, greatly, from the 2010–2011 school year to the 2011–2012 school....Due to this increase, SBHS became a member of the LMU/LA: Family Of Schools.

In July 2012, the school announced the appointment of co-principal, Cynthia Hoepner, who will be Co-Principal of Operations. Co-Principal Mike Alvarez will be in charge of Advancement & Campus Ministry.

In the summer of 2013, Mike Alvarez resigned as co-principal making Cynthia Hoepner the school's first female principal bringing some much needed campus remodeling and upgrading such as changes to the school library, computer labs, hallways, front office/offices, and the installation of wifi.

Patrick Lynch became principal in Fall of 2016.

== Visual/performing arts ==
=== Sports ===
In 1997, the girls' 4 × 100 metres relay team set the NFHS national high school record with a time of 44.70 while winning the CIF California State Meet. The record stood for seven years, until it was beaten by a team from Long Beach Polytechnic High School; it still ranks as the second-best performance in the event.

- That year, the girls' track team—finished half a point behind Long Beach Polytechnic for the overall state team title.
- St. Bernard did not host a Varsity Football team for the 2012 Season. St. Bernard did host a Junior Varsity team for the 2012 season.
- St. Bernard Boys Basketball won the 2015 CIF 5A Southern Section Championship.

== Notable alumni ==
- Butch Hays, basketball player
- Kevin Chilton, astronaut
- Royce Clayton, baseball shortstop
- John Craigie, folk singer
- Shireen Crutchfield, actor, model, and singer
- C.P DUBB, music producer
- Rick Famuyiwa, film director and writer
- Corey Gaines, basketball player and coach
- Joselio Hanson, football cornerback
- Rocky Hinds, football quarterback
- Jim Hughes, baseball pitcher
- Wyking Jones, basketball coach
- Tanjareen Martin, actor and radio personality
- Taylour Paige, actor and dancer
- Donald Penn, football offensive tackle
- Janni Petrofsky (Barbra Piotrowski - '71) Olympian, Wheelchair Marathon Champion, Spinal Cord Researcher. First paralyzed woman to walk using functional electrical stimulation.
- Gerard Robinson, Secretary of Education for the Commonwealth of Virginia
- Antonio Sabàto, Jr., actor and model
- Aaron White, playwright
- Jason Willis, football wide receiver
- DJ A-Tron, DJ and music producer
- Jason Olive, Actor Model and coach
- Olympia Scott, Basketball player WNBA
- Al Smith, football linebacker
