= Del Rey League =

The Del Rey League is a high school athletic conference that is part of the CIF Southern Section. Members are mostly private, parochial schools in the South Bay affiliated the Roman Catholic Archdiocese of Los Angeles.

== Member schools ==
- Bishop Amat Memorial High School (La Puente)
- Bishop Montgomery High School (Torrance)
- Cathedral High School (Los Angeles)
- Junípero Serra High School (Gardena)
- La Salle College Preparatory (Pasadena)
- Mary Star of the Sea High School (San Pedro)
- Paraclete High School (Lancaster)
- St. Anthony High School (Long Beach)
- St. Joseph High School (Lakewood)
- St. Paul High School (Santa Fe Springs)
- Harvard-Westlake School (Studio City) (football only member)
