= Researchers Alliance for Development =

Researchers Alliance for Development (RAD) is a World Bank supported action-oriented and multidisciplinary network of researchers. Recognizing the engagement of academia in the global intellectual debate on development cooperation, the RAD aims to strengthen the interaction between the World Bank and the research community worldwide. It is headed by a steering committee of academics and many major universities over the world are its members.

RAD objectives include: 1. Facilitating interaction between the academic community and the World Bank; 2. Mobilizing the academic and student community on development issues and curricula, facilitating mutual flow of knowledge.

Towards these ends, it runs a number of activities including a student essay prize, a post/doctoral workshop on international organisations and development as well as working groups on an ad hoc basis.

== See also ==
- Global Development Network
- Development studies
- United Nations Research Institute For Social Development
