= St. Genevieve High School =

Private Catholic school in Los Angeles, California, United States

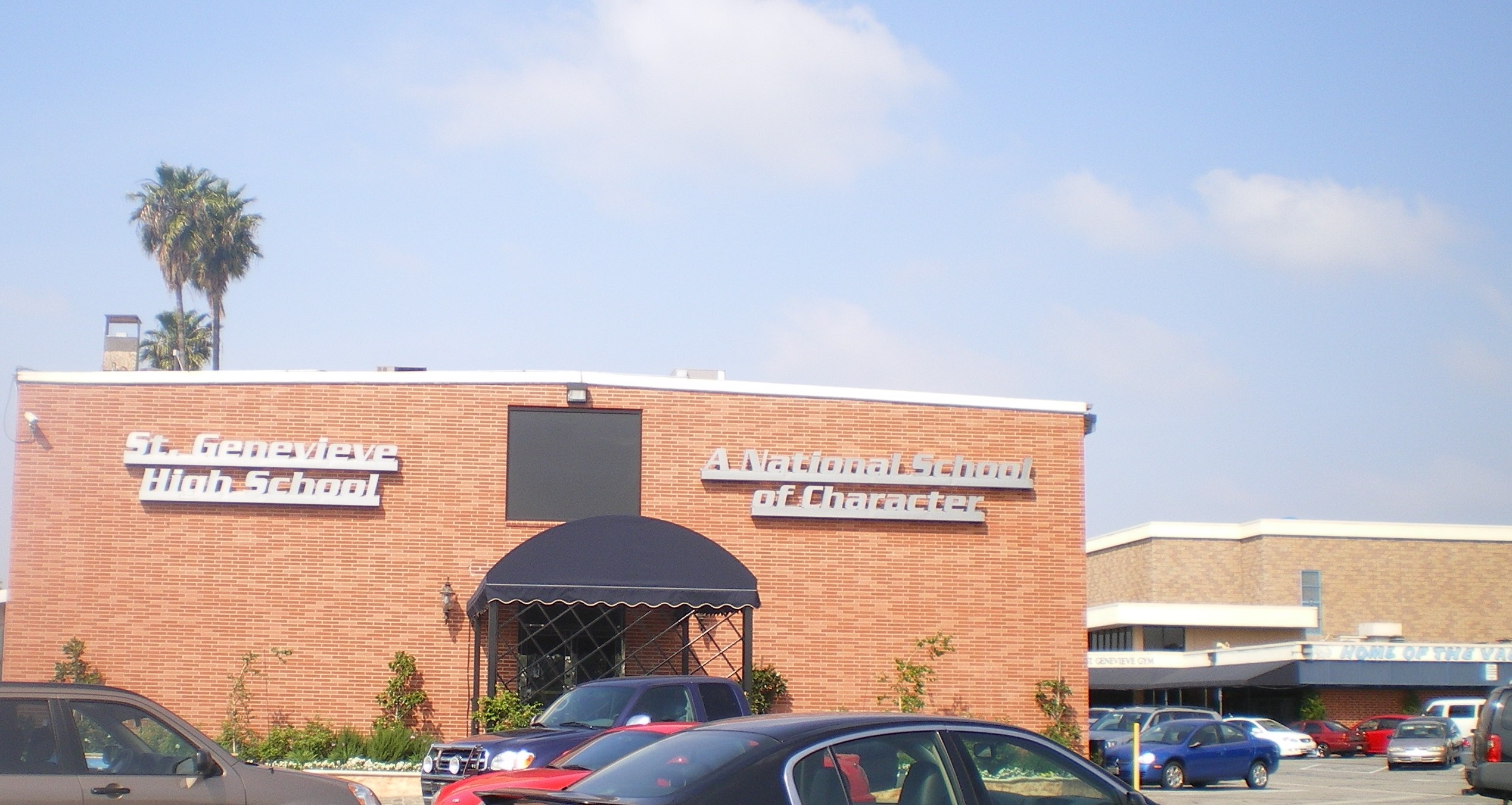

Location
- 13967 Roscoe Boulevard; Los Angeles (Panorama City), California 91402; United States; 34°13′19″N 118°26′17″W

Information
- Type: Private, Coeducational
- Motto: Adveniat Regnum Christi (May the Kingdom of Christ come!)
- Religious affiliations: Roman Catholic; Sisters of St. Joseph of Peace
- Established: 1959
- Principal: Daniel Horn
- Head of school: Vince O'Donoghue
- Colors: Silver and Blue
- Athletics conference: CIF Southern Section; Camino Real League
- Nickname: Valiants
- Accreditation: Western Association of Schools and Colleges
- Website: www.sgps.org/highschool

St. Genevieve High School is a private Roman Catholic high school in Panorama City, Los Angeles, California. It is located in the Roman Catholic Archdiocese of Los Angeles. In 2003, St. Genevieve High School was recognized as a National School of Character by the Character Education Partnership.
