= St. Mary's Academy (Inglewood, California) =

Private school in Inglewood, California, United States

Location
- 701 Grace Avenue; Inglewood, (Los Angeles County), California 90301; United States; 33°58′8″N 118°20′44″W

Information
- Type: Private
- Motto: Deus Illminatio Mea
- Religious affiliations: Roman Catholic; Sisters of Saint Joseph of Carondelet
- Established: 1889
- Principal: Dr. Brandi Odom Lucas
- Grades: 9-12
- Gender: Girls
- Average class size: 50
- Colors: Blue and Gold
- Athletics conference: CIF Southern Section; Camino Real League
- Nickname: Belles
- Accreditation: Western Association of Schools and Colleges
- Tuition: $9,500

St. Mary's Academy (SMA) is a Catholic high school for girls in Inglewood, California, at the intersection of Prairie Avenue and Grace Avenue.

== Background ==
St. Mary's was established in 1889 by the Sisters of Saint Joseph of Carondelet as a private high school for young women. It is the oldest continuously operating Catholic high school in the Archdiocese of Los Angeles. Together with the students' families, the administration, faculty and staff are committed to forming a Christian community that nurtures and challenges each young woman to attain her full potential.
