= Mary Star of the Sea High School =

Location
- 2500 North Taper Avenue; San Pedro, Los Angeles, California 90731; United States; 33°46′1″N 118°18′7″W

Information
- Type: Private
- Motto: Monstra te esse matrem (Show yourself to be our mother)
- Religious affiliation: Roman Catholic
- Established: 1954
- Oversight: Archdiocese of Los Angeles
- Principal: Rita Dever
- Grades: 9-12
- Enrollment: 519 (2010)
- Student to teacher ratio: Coeducational
- Colors: Navy Blue and Gold
- Athletics conference: CIF Southern Section; Camino Del Rey Association
- Nickname: Stars
- Rival: Bishop Montgomery
- Accreditation: Western Association of Schools and Colleges
- Yearbook: Stella Maris
- Tuition: $7,350-$15,000
- Website: www.marystarhigh.com

The Mary Star of the Sea High School (Mary Star High) is a private, Roman Catholic high school in the San Pedro neighborhood of Los Angeles, California, United States.

The school is operated by Mary Star of the Sea Catholic Church in San Pedro under the supervision of the Department of Catholic Schools of the Archdiocese of Los Angeles. It was named one of the top 50 Catholic high schools in America in 2006.

== Academics ==
The following Advanced Placement classes are offered: AP Calculus, AP English Literature and Composition, AP European History, AP Government, AP Spanish Language and Culture, AP Environmental Science, AP Physics, and AP U.S. History.

== History ==
Mary Star of the Sea was a co-educational high school established in 1954 by the parish of Mary Star of the Sea. Mary Star of the Sea Elementary School had been previously founded by the parish in 1922.

In 1959, the Archdiocese decided to create a separate boys' high school in San Pedro, Fermin Lasuén High School, and Mary Star of the Sea transitioned over several years to a girls' school. The Class of 1962 was the last co-ed class. Fermin Lasuén was closed in 1971, and MSoS once again became coeducational, absorbing the students from Firmen Lausén.

The school was originally located on 8th Street and moved to a brand new campus on Taper Avenue in the fall of 2007.

On June 10, 2021, the girls' basketball team captured the school's first CIF-Southern Section sports championship with a 54–50 victory over Agoura of Agoura Hills for the Division 4-AA title in front of a large standing room only crowd at Mary Star High.

== Notable alumni (including Fermin Lasuén alumni) ==
- Neal King, educator, college administrator and psychologist
- Haven Moses, professional AFL and NFL American football player
- Tim Wrightman, professional NFL and USFL American football player
