= San Gabriel Mission High School =

Location
- 254 South Santa Anita Street; San Gabriel, CA; San Gabriel, (Los Angeles County), California 91776; United States; 34°5′56.37″N 118°6′25.67″W

Information
- Type: Private
- Religious affiliation: Roman Catholic
- Established: 1949
- Principal: Michelle Sarmiento-Deary
- Grades: 9-12
- Gender: Girls
- Colors: Green and White
- Team name: Lady Pioneers
- Accreditation: Western Association of Schools and Colleges International Baccalaureate
- Dean of Women: Samantha Padilla
- Director of Marketing and Admissions: Jackelin Cuevas
- Website: www.sgmhs.org

San Gabriel Mission High School is an all-girls Catholic College Preparatory high school located on the grounds of the fourth mission of California, which was founded in 1771 by Franciscan priests and often used by Junipero Serra as his headquarters. It is located in the Roman Catholic Archdiocese of Los Angeles.

== History ==
San Gabriel Mission High School is a Catholic College Preparatory high school, located on the grounds of the fourth mission of California, which was founded in 1771 by the Franciscan fathers. The Claretians began administration of the parish in 1908. The idea for the high school began in the mid-1940s and was the "vision of Father J. Nuevo, C.M.F., Mission San Gabriel pastor. With the need for a high school and the support of his parishioners, Father Nuevo had collected a sizable $245,000 toward the realization of the project." He was transferred in 1948 and his successor, Father Eugene Herran, C.M.F. "only enjoyed a pastorate for a few months, as his success in dealing with the complexities of the new school building project resulted in his election as General Treasurer of the Claretian Fathers."

On January 16, 1949, the groundbreaking ceremonies took place. San Gabriel Mission High School opened in September 1949 as a co-institutional school, which meant that boys and girls were taught separately, the boys' section administered by the Claretian Fathers and the girls' section administered by the Dominican Sisters of Mission San Jose. The freshmen class had 119 girls and boys, temporarily quartered in All Souls Grammar School in nearby Alhambra. In February 1950, the freshmen moved into their new building. The first principals were Father John Schneider, C.M.F. and Sister Mary Redempta Prose, O.P. "The staff numbered three priests, Fathers Schneider, C.M.F., Leo Mattecheck, C.M.F. and Joseph Anglim, C.M.F. There were three sisters, Sisters Redempta, O.P., Columba Davalos, O.P. and Mary Raymond Carmody, O.P., and two lay teachers – Mr. John Hanrahan and Mrs. Leo Ryder." In October of that year, "Sister Maureen Murphy O.P. joined the sisters' community as an additional staff member." Dedication ceremonies took place on January 14, 1951, with Most Reverend J. Francis McIntyre, Archbishop of Los Angeles, officiating.

The new school selected green and silver as the school colors, signifying hope and sterling worth. In honor of the Mission's history, the student body chose "Pioneers" as the school name. Clubs and activities organized during these first years include: Student Council, Sodality, GAA, Glee club, Orchestra and Drama clubs. The boys were able to join football, basketball, track, soccer, golf, bowling and tennis teams. The girls participated in volleyball, basketball, and tennis. Intramural sports, Play Day and Field Day became, and still are, annual events. Dances, rallies, drama and musicals rounded out the activity schedule.

The students took part in dramatic plays and musicals. The chorus began in 1950, when Mission students performed "Tribute to Stephen Foster". For many years, the Drama Club and Glee Club were presented their operetta at the San Gabriel Mission Playhouse. Plays performed in the high school auditorium include Bye Bye Birdie in the 1970s, Steel Magnolias in the 1980s, and later In Juliet's Garden, at the Grapevine Arbor.

In 1963, the Mission Band participated in the parade competition at the Annual Temple City Camellia Parade. And, in that same year the Boys Pioneer Basketball Team were in CIF for the seventh time. The Mission Soccer Team won the League Title in 1966 and won the Southern Section CIF championship in 1967 and 1968. Mission's athletic teams have included and continue to include CIF performances as well as Horizon League Championships. In 2007, Mission TV went live on the internet and in 2009, the Cultural Room opened, where language clubs host meetings.

The following are the names of all of the principals of San Gabriel Mission High School:

- 1949-1951: Fr. John Schneider; S. Mary Redempta Prose
- 1951-1952: Fr. Leo Mattecheck; S. Rita Marie Brown
- 1952-1954: Fr. John Schneider; S. Rita Marie Brown
- 1954-1957: Fr. Leo Mattecheck; S. Rita Marie Brown
- 1957-1958: Fr. Leo Mattecheck; S. Alberta Oehlke
- 1958-1963: Fr. Leo Mattecheck; S. John Dominic Samaha
- 1963-1966: Fr. Henry Herrera; S. John Dominic Samaha
- 1966-1967: Fr. Matthew Di Maria; S. John Dominic Samaha
- 1967-1970: Fr. Matthew Di Maria; S. Mara Martin
- 1970-1971: S. Mara Martin
- 1971-1973: S. Katherine Jean Cowen
- 1973-1979: S. Mary Patrick English
- 1979-1987: S. Carolyn Kolander
- 1987-1988: S. Carolyn Kolander (on leave); Mr. Frank Laurenzello
- 1989-2000: Mr. Frank Laurenzello
- 2000-2006: Mrs. Carolyn Nelson
- 2006-2015: Mr. Jamie Collins
- 2015-2018:Dr. Marielle Sallo
- 2018–2025: Ms. Raquel Cagigas, '96
- 2025-present: Ms. Michelle Sarmiento-Deary

In the fall of 1971 San Gabriel Mission High School became an all-girls' school, at which time the Claretians withdrew. It has maintained its full accreditation through the Western Association of Schools and Colleges since 1954.

In the Fall of 1994, the new chemistry lab was finished and in the Fall of 1996, the new Physical Science Lab was opened. In 1997 a chapel was completed. In the Fall of 1999, a new biology lab was completed. 2007 saw the opening of a new exercise room, which is currently under renovation. In 2008 the auditorium floor was replaced, and in 2009 a new dance studio was completed.

== Academics ==
SGMHS is accredited by the WCEA/WASC and follows archdiocesan and state mandates.

San Gabriel Mission High School offers Enrichment Courses, SAT Prep, Personal College Admissions Advisement, Advanced Placement (AP) courses, the AP Capstone Program.

The school briefly held the International Baccalaureate (IB) programme.

== Demographics ==
The current student population is 150+ students. Student commute from various cities from the San Gabriel Valley and Greater Los Angeles Region.

== Sports ==
As a member of the California Interscholastic Federation (CIF), the governing body for high school sports in the state of California, San Gabriel Mission High School is a member of the Horizon League. Sports at San Gabriel Mission High School include:

- Basketball
- Cross-Country
- Soccer
- Softball
- Track and Field
- Volleyball

== Notable alumni ==
- Kenny Loggins (class of 1966), American singer and songwriter

== See also ==
- Mission San Gabriel Arcángel
