= Ramona Convent Secondary School =

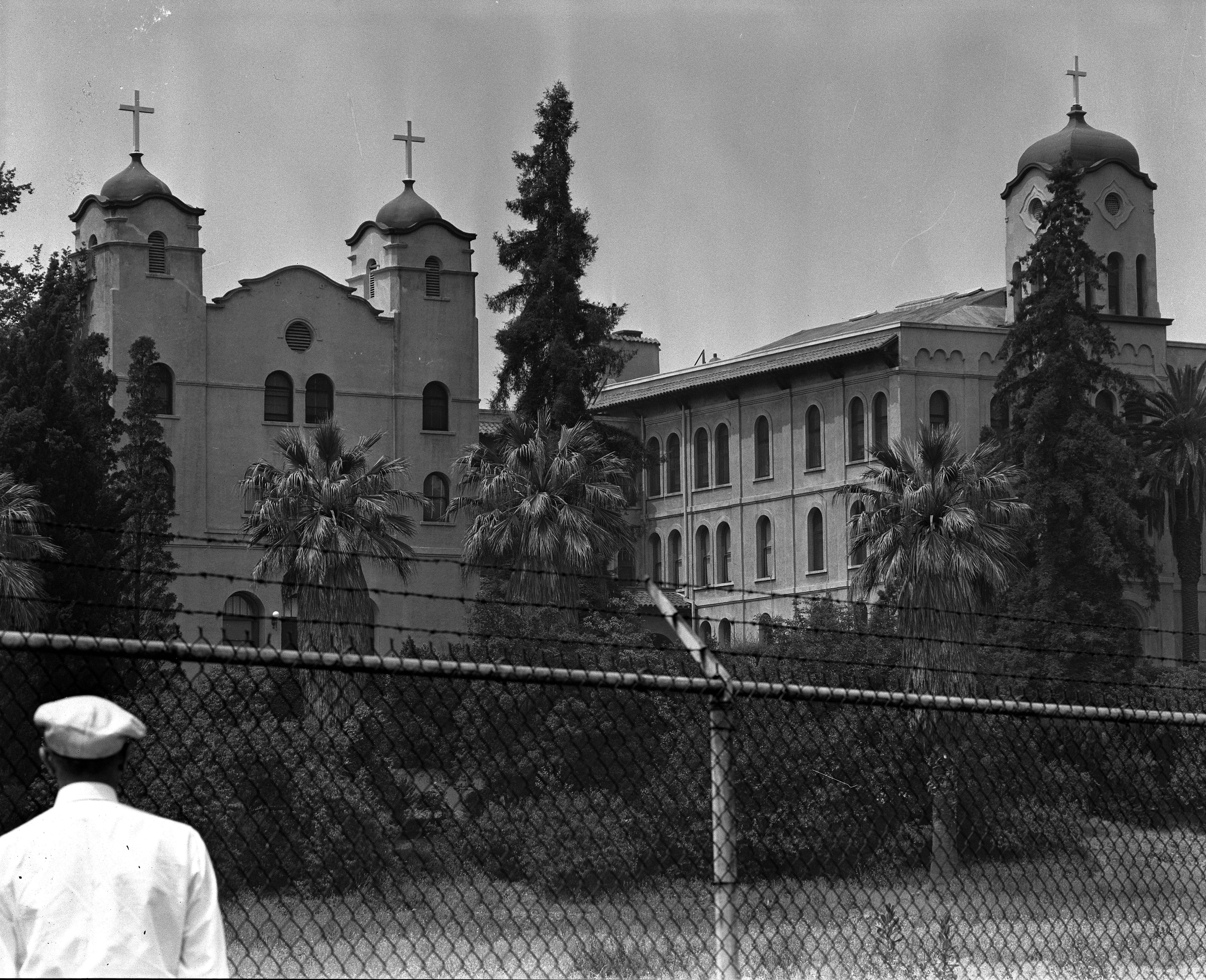
- View of the school in 1956

Location
- 1701 West Ramona Road; Alhambra, (Los Angeles County), California 91803; United States; 34°4′24″N 118°8′23.35″W

Information
- Type: Private
- Religious affiliation: Roman Catholic
- Patron saint: Joan of Arc
- Established: 1889
- President: Sr. Kathleen Callaway
- Principal: Jose Alberto Chavarria
- Grades: 9-12
- Gender: Girls
- Enrollment: 300
- Campus size: 19 acres (77,000 m^{2})
- Colors: White and Gold
- Team name: Tigers
- Accreditation: Western Association of Schools and Colleges Western Catholic Education Association
- Affiliation: National Coalition of Girls Schools, National Catholic Education Association
- Alumni: over 5,700
- Associate Principal Curriculum: Halina Szymanski
- Admissions Director: Veronica Puente-Smith
- Athletic Director: Rebecca Lamas
- Dean of Students: Valerie Green
- Website: www.ramonaconvent.org

Ramona Convent Secondary School is a private, Catholic, college preparatory school for girls grades 9–12, located in Alhambra, California, a suburb of Los Angeles. It is sponsored by the Sisters of the Holy Names of Jesus and Mary. Established in 1889 and named after Ramona Yorba, wife of Benjamin Davis Wilson, Ramona is one of the oldest continually operating schools in the same location in California. Ramona is fully accredited by the Western Association of Schools and Colleges, part of the Western Catholic Education Association, and was a U.S. Department of Education Blue Ribbon School of Excellence recipient in 1993 and 1998. Ramona was voted "Best Catholic School" in the San Gabriel Valley Readers' Choice Awards in 2018 and again in 2019.

== High school program ==
99–100% of Ramona graduates enter college directly after graduation. Ramona has a college-prep program with Advanced Placement, Honors, Arts, STEM (Science, Technology, Engineering, and Math), and elective courses, including the AP Capstone Program with its emphasis on college-level research, writing, presentation skills, and AP Computer Science Principles.

== Co-curricular activities ==
More than 30 clubs and student organizations are offered including the California Scholarship Federation, the National Honor Society, the International Cultural Society, Interact, the International Thespian Society, the Peace and Justice Society, the Art Club, the Science Club, Book Buddies, and others.

Theater, music, and dance performances are presented throughout the year. Ramona's FIRST Robotics Competition team, one of only a few all-girl teams in competition, is sponsored by Northrop Grumman, Caltech, SpaceX and other benefactors. As a member of the Sisters of the Holy Names of Jesus and Mary School Network of Schools, Ramona students participate in the Youth Justice Forum, a solutions-oriented youth conference that includes high school students from the United States, Canada, and Africa.

Ramona athletes complete on 13 teams in seven sports: basketball, cross country, soccer, softball, swimming, track & field, and volleyball, in the Horizon League under the California Interscholastic Federation.

== Notable alumni ==
- Lucille Roybal-Allard, Member of US House of Representatives from California.
- Loretta Young, Academy Award-winning actress of film and television.
- Marisa Ramirez, American actress.
- Melissa Villaseñor, American actress, stand-up comedian, and impressionist.
- Marquise Auramornrat, Thai singer-songwriter, dancer and model.
