= Crossroads Christian Academy (disambiguation) =

Crossroads Christian Academy might refer to:

- Crossroads Christian Academy, Corozal, Panama
- Crossroads Christian School, Corona, California
- Crossroads Christian School, West Plains, Missouri

== See also ==
- Crossroads Christian Church, a megachurch in Corona, California
