= AVHS =

AVHS may refer to:

- Amador Valley High School in Pleasanton, California
- Antelope Valley High School in Lancaster, California
- Apple Valley High School (disambiguation)
- Arroyo Valley High School in San Bernardino, California
- Assabet Valley High School in Marlborough, Massachusetts
