= Pacific High School (San Bernardino, California) =

Location
- 1020 Pacific Street; San Bernardino, California; United States; 34.129°N 117.265°W

Information
- Type: Senior High School
- Motto: Pride, Honor, Success
- Established: 1953
- School district: San Bernardino City Unified School District
- Principal: Natalie Raymundo
- Teaching staff: 60.91 (FTE)
- Grades: 9 – 12
- Enrollment: 1,222 (2023-2024)
- Student to teacher ratio: 20.06
- Colours: Purple, silver and white
- Mascot: Pirate
- Rival: San Bernardino High School
- Yearbook: Pacificana
- Website: San Bernardino City Schools

Pacific High School is a high school in the San Bernardino City Unified School District located in San Bernardino, California, at the corner of Pacific Street and Perris Hill Park Road.

Total campus size is relatively large. It houses the Elsie Gibbs Auditorium, 79 classrooms, 15 - 20 portable classrooms, tennis courts, baseball & softball fields, football field, indoor basketball courts, and the Bailey Bowl where graduation ceremonies were held.

== Notable alumni and other facts ==
A nationally recognized AVID Demonstration School

The Art Club in the year 2007 contributed its artistic labor to the painting of the 210 Freeway underpass mural.

Twyla Tharp, famous choreographer, graduated from PHS.

Pacific High School has graduated many professional athletes including NFL players such as Mark Anthony Collins, Ryan Nece, Jason Moore, and Ula Tuitele. Basketball player Greg Bunch was a second-round pick in the 1978 NBA draft. College Hall of Fame Coach Chris Ault played quarterback at Pacific, played QB at Nevada in Reno, and went on to win high school championships as coach at both Bishop Manogue High School and Reno High School. Ault later was head coach at Nevada, where the Wolfpack won 233 games.

Pacific also graduated state wrestling champion Tommy Vargas in 2001.

Pacific had first Girls CIF wrestling champion Samantha Cardoza in 2010. She is the first girl in San Bernardino County to take first place in girls C.I.F. In 2011, she placed third in C.I.F and went on to place sixth at California State level in 2011. She was the only girl in her weight class to represent Southern California that year and was coached by her parents David and Suzie Cardoza.

Kathy Garver, actress best known for playing teenager Cissie on TV series Family Affair, graduated from PHS in 1964.

Professional golfer Dave Stockton graduated from PHS in 1959.

Film and TV actor/director Scott Paulin graduated from PHS in 1967.

== Music program ==
The music program is directed by .
