= Delphic League (California) =

High school athletic league in California, United States

The Delphic League is a high school athletic league that is part of the CIF Southern Section.

== Members ==
- Crossroads School
- Milken High School
- Marshall Fundamental Secondary School
- Vernon Kilpatrick Camp School, a.k.a. Kilpatrick High School
- Brentwood School (Los Angeles, California)
