= Mariners Church =

Church in Irvine, California

Coordinates: 33°37′50″N 117°50′01″W

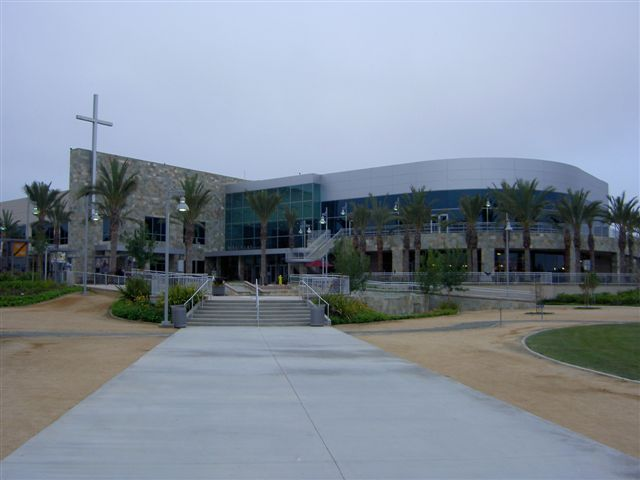
- Worship center
- Mariners Church
- Country: United States
- Denomination: Non-denominational
- Website: www.marinerschurch.org

History
- Founded: 1965

Clergy
- Pastor(s): Eric Geiger; Kenton Beshore

Mariners Church is a non-denominational, Christian megachurch located in Irvine, California, situated in central Orange County, and as of 2022 was the 41st largest church in the United States by number of attendees as well as one of the fastest growing.

Eric Geiger is the current Senior Pastor of Mariners Church, assuming the role in 2018 after a six-month search process. The previous Senior Pastor, Kenton Beshore, who began his career at Mariners Church as the College Pastor in 1978, led the church from 1984 to 2018 and remains actively involved as Pastor Emeritus. A podcast detailing the transition process and continued partnership of Beshore and Geiger is set to release in 2024. Geiger received his doctorate in leadership and church ministry from Southern Seminary, and is the author of several books including the best-selling church leadership book, Simple Church. Under his leadership, Mariners Church has grown to seven locations in Southern California, expanded its digital and online offerings (including virtual worship experiences and small groups), and brought worship services to the Orange County Rescue Mission, Orangewood Children's Home, Sunburst Youth Academy, senior living facilities, and prisons throughout North America.

== Congregation and style of worship ==
In 2016, Mariners averaged about 13,861 attendees per week among its seven campuses, making it one of the largest churches in the United States. The church's membership has been described as "drawn from two affluent, predominately white communities, [and having] a generous sprinkling of the financially successful and socially prominent." According to Beshore, “Many of these people work in the business world. They're pragmatic; either something works or it doesn't. They're aggressive, not passive, searchers. So they find out real quick if we’re real." Like many megachurches, it has a casual style of worship. Beshore preached a series of sermons with the theme that "Jesus hates religion."

=== Outreach ===
Mariners actively serves both locally and globally to meet the needs of others, enlisting hundreds of church attenders to participate in active partnerships with Lighthouse Community Center, Orange County Rescue Mission, as well as the operation of its own food pantry and onsite thrift store.

=== Beliefs ===
The church is not affiliated with a specific denomination but adheres to a specific Statement of Faith.

== History ==
=== Buildings and facilities ===
Mariners Church began as a small group of Christians who met for Bible studies in homes in the Newport Beach area starting in 1963. In 1964, this group organized the first Newport Beach Mayor's Prayer Breakfast, an event that has occurred annually ever since. As the church grew, it moved from holding services in a family home, to a series of rented locations, including Monte Vista School, Mariners Elementary School (the location from which the church derives its name), Corona Del Mar High School, and the Community Room of the Bank of Newport building on Pacific Coast Highway in Newport Beach.

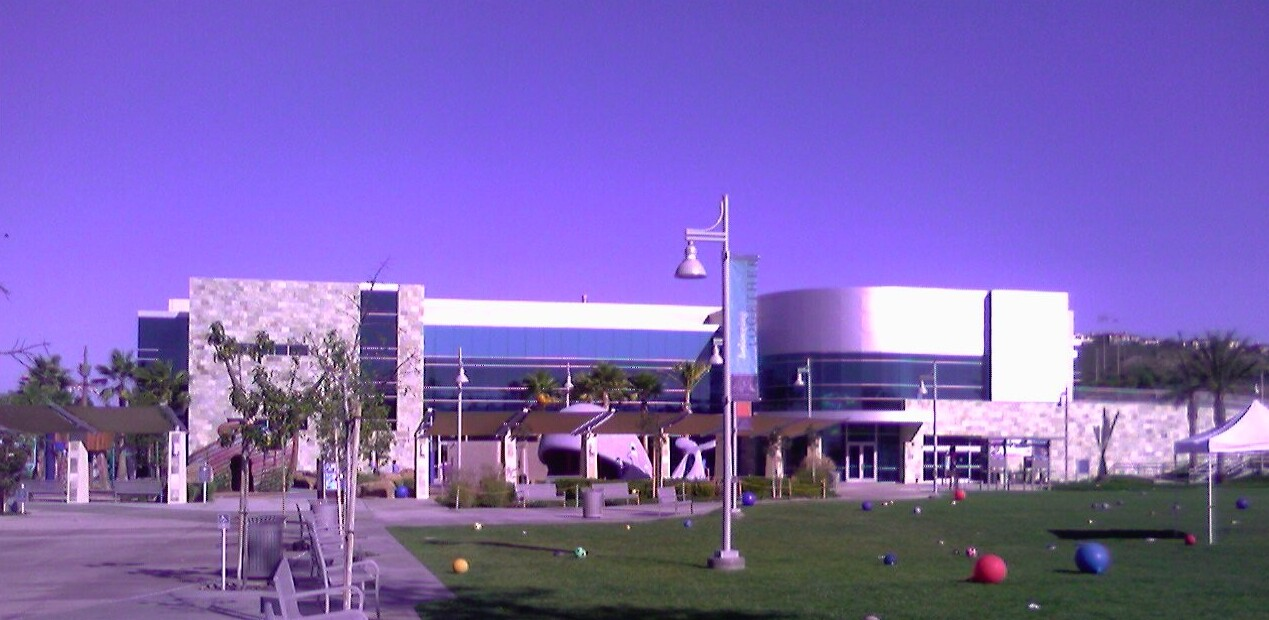
The Kids Building

In 1967 the first full-time pastor was hired. The church purchased and built its first owned facilities at the corner of Bison and Jamboree in Newport Beach. In 1980 the church split, and a portion of the church formed a new church called South Coast Community Church on a portion of the property where the church is located today. In 1996, the church reunited. For several years, services were held in both locations.

In 1998, the church swapped the Bison property with Liberty Baptist Church, which had a property adjoining the South Coast Community church property. Finally, the church purchased another adjoining property from the Irvine Company for $18 million, expanding the campus by 18 acres (73,000 m^{2}) to reach its current size. The church built and opened Port Mariners children's building in June 2005 and the new Worship Center, bookstore and café in November 2005 at a cost of approximately $35 million. In November 2006, the church raised initial funds to build a new student ministries facility (Student Center), a chapel, a parking garage (completed October 2007), and remodeling of the administrative building, at an expected cost of $33 million. The project was completed in October 2008.

In 2020, to serve the Southern California community during the COVID-19 pandemic, Mariners Church opened additional neighborhood congregations and now meets at 7 locations including Irvine, Huntington Beach (opened in 2017), Mission Viejo, North Irvine, Santa Ana, Tustin, Oceanside as well as a congregation that meets online each week. In 2020, Mariners Church also launched Mariners Hosted Here as a way for church members to meet in homes and worship together. Since then, Mariners Hosted Here has grown, bringing worship services to traditionally closed facilities like senior living homes, mental health treatment centers, prisons, and more.

=== Social and political controversies ===
In 2001, the director of women's ministries outed the choir director to the church's board, and the church responded by offering him therapy to "cure" him of his homosexuality, then firing him when he refused. The church was sued, and defended itself successfully through a long-running series of appeals on First Amendment grounds, saying that 'an admission of homosexuality could be interpreted as "moral and sexual actions that are a sin."'

In 2013, politically conservative church members were offended when Beshore traveled to Washington, DC, to lobby for a pathway to citizenship for undocumented immigrants. According to a Wall Street Journal interview, 'Mr. Beshore said some members (of Mariners) accused the church of taking a political position that flouted U.S. law after preaching about immigration in the fall. "I tell my people they need the poor far more than the poor need them. That's what a follower of Christ should do," said Beshore.
