= Freelance League =

High school athletic league in California, US

The Freelance League is a name for a loosely defined high school athletic league that is part of the CIF Southern Section. Member schools are small schools. The word "Freelance" describes that they find competitive situations where available without a formal league structure. Schools are spread across the entire section from San Luis Obispo County to San Bernardino County and Riverside County. In certain sports some of these teams are part of other leagues.

The 1993 film Gridiron Gang was inspired by the Kilpatrick Mustangs. Jordan Hasay was a hero at the 2008 Olympic Trials while still a junior at Mission Prep. Verbum Dei has a lengthy championship history. Bellarmine-Jefferson High School has hosted the Bell-Jeff Invitational, a large cross country meet, since 1974 that has become a Southern California institution.

== Members ==
- Vernon Kilpatrick Camp School (Kilpatrick High School)
- LaVerne Lutheran
- Santa Rosa Academy, Menifee
- Valley Torah High School
- Edgewood High School
- Rancho Christian School
- Indian Springs High School
- Rancho Christian School
- Crossroads Christian School
- Hope Centre Academy
- Antelope Valley Christian School
- Eastside Christian School
- Lake Arrowhead Christian School
- Bellarmine-Jefferson High School
- Lakeview leadership academy
