= Malcolm Moore (American football) =

American football player (born 1961)

No. 84
- Positions: Wide receiver, Tight end

Personal information
- Born: June 24, 1961 (age 65); San Francisco, California, U.S.
- Listed height: 6 ft 3 in (1.91 m)
- Listed weight: 240 lb (109 kg)

Career information
- High school: San Fernando (CA)
- College: USC
- Supplemental draft: 1984: 2nd round, 54th overall pick

Career history
- Los Angeles Express (1984); Dallas Cowboys (1985)*; San Diego Chargers (1986)*; Los Angeles Rams (1987)
- * Offseason or practice squad member only

Career NFL statistics
- Games played: 3
- Receptions: 6
- Receiving Yards: 107
- Touchdowns: 1
- Stats at Pro Football Reference

Malcolm Grady Moore (born June 24, 1961) is an American former professional football player who was a tight end in the National Football League (NFL) for the Los Angeles Rams. He also was a member of the Los Angeles Express in the United States Football League (USFL). He played college football for the USC Trojans.

== Early life ==
Moore attended San Fernando High School, where he earned All-City and All-American honors in 1979. Along with teammates Bob McClanahan and Anthony Gibson, he accepted a football scholarship from the University of Southern California.

Moore is mostly known for catching a pass from quarterback John Mazur in 1981, that gave his team a first down at the seven with 17 seconds left and that contributed for a last minute drive to win 28–24 over the second ranked University of Oklahoma.

Moore was declared academically ineligible for his junior season. In 1983, he posted 10 receptions for 159 yards. He finished his college career with 37 receptions for 598 yards and 2 touchdowns.

== Professional career ==
=== Los Angeles Express (USFL) ===
Moore was selected by the Los Angeles Express of the United States Football League in the 1984 USFL Territorial Draft. He signed a contract on January 20, 1984, and started 7 games as a rookie.

With Steve Young throwing to him, Moore registered 37 receptions (third on the team) for 598 yards and 2 touchdowns. He was waived on February 10, 1985.

=== Dallas Cowboys ===
Moore was selected by the Dallas Cowboys in the second round (54th overall) of the 1984 NFL Supplemental Draft of USFL and CFL Players. He signed a contract in March, 1985, to begin playing in the NFL. He was released before the start of the season.

=== San Diego Chargers ===
On April 15, 1986, Moore signed as a free agent with the San Diego Chargers to play tight end. He was placed on the injured reserve list with a knee injury on August 18. He was waived on September 7, 1987.

=== Los Angeles Rams ===
After the players went on a strike on the third week of the 1987 season, those games were canceled (reducing the 16 game season to 15) and the NFL decided that the games would be played with replacement players. Moore was signed to be a part of the Los Angeles Rams replacement team. He played in 3 games (1 start) and was released after the strike ended. On March 7, 1988, he was re-signed and later cut on August 12.

== Personal life ==
After his playing career, Moore became a counselor at Camp Kilpatrick, a juvenile detention center, and as assistant coach of their Kilpatrick Mustangs football team. He was played by Xzibit in the 2006 film, Gridiron Gang.

Moore's brother Manfred played running back in the NFL. In 1991, he returned to USC to finish his degree in public administration. His nephew, Solomon Byrd, currently plays in the NFL for the Houston Texans.

Moore is married to Diane Wilson Moore.
