= Rodney Purvis =

American basketball player (born 1994)

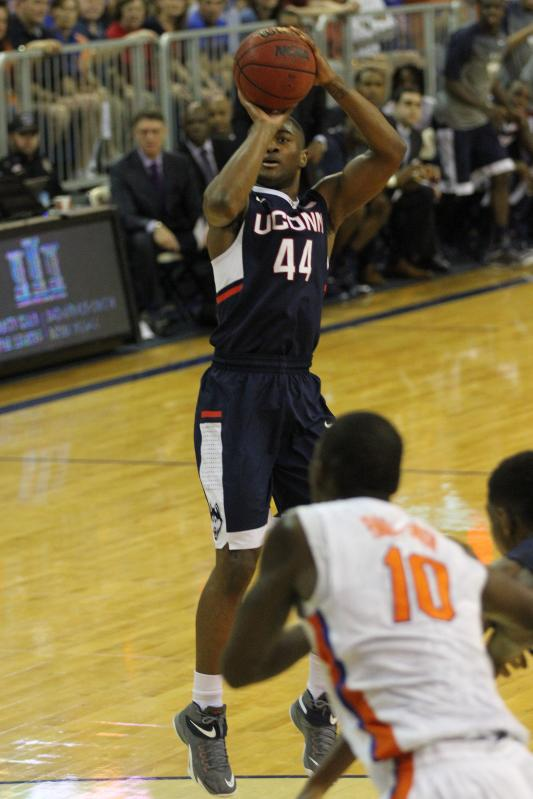
- Purvis with UConn in 2015

No. 15 – Kozuv
- Position: Shooting guard
- League: Macedonian League

Personal information
- Born: February 14, 1994 (age 32) Plymouth, North Carolina, U.S.
- Listed height: 6 ft 4 in (1.93 m)
- Listed weight: 205 lb (93 kg)

Career information
- High school: Upper Room Christian Academy (Raleigh, North Carolina)
- College: NC State (2012–2013); UConn (2014–2017)
- NBA draft: 2017: undrafted
- Playing career: 2017–present

Career history
- 2017–2018: Lakeland Magic
- 2018: Orlando Magic
- 2018–2019: Sioux Falls Skyforce
- 2019–2020: Hapoel Tel Aviv
- 2020: Pallacanestro Cantù
- 2020–2021: Bergamo Basket 2014
- 2021: Wilki Morskie Szczecin
- 2021–2022: Cherkaski Mavpy
- 2022: Hebraica Macabi
- 2022: Trepça
- 2022–2023: Peja
- 2023: BC Gargždai
- 2023–2024: Spartak Pleven
- 2024–2025: Cherno More
- 2025–present: Kožuv

Career highlights
- NBA G League All-Rookie Team (2018); First-team Parade All-American (2012); North Carolina Mr. Basketball (2012); McDonald's All-American (2012)
- Stats at NBA.com
- Stats at Basketball Reference
Medals
Men's basketball
Representing the United States
FIBA Americas U18 Championship
Gold medal – first place	2012 Brazil	Team

Rodney O'Keith Purvis (born February 14, 1994) is an American professional basketball player for Kožuv of the Macedonian League. A shooting guard from Plymouth, North Carolina, he played college basketball for the NC State Wolfpack and the UConn Huskies.

== High school career ==
In October 2010, Purvis reclassified from the high school class of 2013 to the class of 2012. He said his classes would be in order and he could not wait to go to college. In the spring of 2011, he committed to Louisville, but reopened his recruitment in May after Louisville assistant Tim Fuller went to Missouri. On September 30, 2011, he announced his intent to play for Mark Gottfried at N.C. State, choosing the Wolfpack over offers from Connecticut, Memphis, Duke, Missouri and Ohio State.

He was the 2012 North Carolina Gatorade Player of the Year. Purvis played in the 2012 McDonald's All-American Boys Game. On April 14, 2012, Purvis compiled 22 points, two rebounds and three steals in the Jordan Brand Classic. He was named the co-MVP with Shabazz Muhammad.

ESPN analyst Dave Telep wrote, "In a short period of time, Purvis distinguished himself as an athletic, strong, scoring threat. Excellent off the drive and finishing in the paint, he's difficult to guard. There's an attacking presence he brings to the table, making him one of the best young offensive players in his age group." He drew some comparison to fellow Raleigh native John Wall, although Purvis tried to shrug off these comparison. According to ESPN, he was the 15th best recruit in his class. He was the 12th ranked recruit in his class according to Rivals.com.

== College career ==
In his only year at N.C. State, Purvis played in 35 games and averaged 8.3 points and 2.4 rebounds per game. He shot 44 percent from the floor and 38.2 percent from the three-point line. He was named ACC Rookie of the Week on November 12. Purvis scored a season-high 21 against Boston College on February 27. However, his minutes fell off when coach Gottfried moved forward T. J. Warren into the starting lineup, and Purvis scored a total of 12 points and played an average of 12.8 minutes in the final four games. He announced he was transferring to Connecticut on April 5, 2013. He said that N.C. State was not a good fit and he wanted to go off on his own. In his redshirt season, he trained with Shabazz Napier. A nagging shoulder injury caused Purvis to undergo surgery to repair a left labral tear in December 2013. Purvis worked extensively with teammate Ryan Boatright to get ready for his first eligible season at UConn.

Purvis was forced to sit out a game in his sophomore season for playing in two summer leagues. Purvis was named AAC player of the week on March 2, 2015, after registering 28 points, three assists and three steals in an 81–73 win against SMU. He was selected to the All-AAC Tournament Team after scoring 29 points against SMU in the championship game. He finished second on the team in points per game (11.6) and 3-pointers (54) and collected 2.4 rebounds per game.

Purvis had 28 points in a win against UMass Lowell on December 20, 2015. As a junior, Purvis led the team in scoring with 12.8 points per game, to go with 72 assists and 32 steals in 36 games total. He led the Huskies to the NCAA Tournament, where they beat Colorado, then lost to Kansas in the second round. He declared for the 2016 NBA draft, but declined to hire an agent and opted to return to Connecticut for his final season on May 5. Purvis worked out at Chris Paul's camp for guards in the summer.

== Professional career ==
=== Lakeland Magic (2017–2018) ===
After going undrafted in the 2017 NBA draft, Purvis joined the Utah Jazz for the 2017 NBA Summer League. On October 9, 2017, Purvis signed a non-guaranteed contract with the Orlando Magic, but was later waived by the Magic before the start of the season. On October 23, 2017, Purvis was included in training camp roster of the Lakeland Magic.

=== Orlando Magic (2018) ===
On March 8, 2018, the Orlando Magic had announced that they had signed Purvis to a 10-day contract. Purvis had his NBA debut one day later, playing in 10 minutes of action in a 94–88 loss to the Sacramento Kings. Purvis signed a second 10-day contract on March 18, and signed for the remainder of the season on March 28.

On July 20, 2018, Purvis was traded to the Oklahoma City Thunder in exchange for Dakari Johnson and cash considerations.

On July 23, 2018, Purvis was traded to the Boston Celtics in exchange for Abdel Nader. Oklahoma City also received cash considerations in the deal. On July 30, 2018, Purvis was waived by the Celtics.

=== Sioux Falls Skyforce (2018–2019) ===
Purvis signed with the Miami Heat on October 11, 2018. He was waived on October 13. Purvis was subsequently added to the roster of the Sioux Falls Skyforce. In 49 games played for the Skyforce, he averaged 14.5 points, 3.8 rebounds and 3.6 assists per game.

=== Hapoel Tel Aviv (2019) ===
On July 27, 2019, Purvis signed a one-year deal with Hapoel Tel Aviv of the Israeli Premier League. On September 29, 2019, he parted ways with Hapoel after appearing in one pre-season tournament game.

=== Pallacanestro Cantù (2020) ===
On February 25, 2020, he has signed with Pallacanestro Cantù of the Italian LBA.

=== Bergamo Basket (2020–2021) ===
On August 9, 2020, Purvis signed with Bergamo Basket 2014, in the Serie A2 second tier Italian national league.

=== King Wilki Morskie Szczecin (2021) ===
On February 23, 2021, Purvis signed with Wilki Morskie Szczecin, in the Polish Basketball League. He averaged 7.8 points, 2.9 assists, and 1.1 rebounds per game.

=== Cherkaski Mavpy (2021–2022) ===
On August 27, 2021, Purvis signed with Cherkaski Mavpy of the Ukrainian Basketball SuperLeague. He averaged 10.3 points, 3.8 assists, and 2.3 rebounds per game. Purvis parted ways with the team on January 4, 2022.

== Career statistics ==
Legend
GP	Games played	GS	Games started	MPG	Minutes per game
FG%	Field goal percentage	3P%	3-point field goal percentage	FT%	Free throw percentage
RPG	Rebounds per game	APG	Assists per game	SPG	Steals per game
BPG	Blocks per game	PPG	Points per game	**Bold**	Career high

=== NBA ===
==== Regular season ====
Year	Team	GP	GS	MPG	FG%	3P%	FT%	RPG	APG	SPG	BPG	PPG
2017–18	Orlando	16	2	18.1	.327	.250	.867	1.7	1.1	.2	.2	6.0
Career		16	2	18.1	.327	.250	.867	1.7	1.1	.2	.2	6.0

=== College ===
Year	Team	GP	GS	MPG	FG%	3P%	FT%	RPG	APG	SPG	BPG	PPG
2012–13	NC State	34	23	26.0	**.444**	**.395**	.512	2.4	1.3	.6	.1	8.5
2014–15	Connecticut	33	24	28.7	.429	.360	.538	2.4	1.2	.8	**.2**	11.6
2015–16	Connecticut	**36**	21	28.8	.434	.385	.657	3.0	2.1	.9	.1	12.8
2016–17	Connecticut	33	**32**	**36.9**	.372	.341	**.811**	**4.2**	**2.5**	**1.0**	**.2**	**13.8**
Career		136	100	29.9	.416	.363	.638	3.0	1.8	.8	.1	11.6

== National team career ==
On February 8, 2018, Purvis was selected to participate in USA World Cup Qualifying Team training camp.

== Personal life ==
His godfather is N.C. Central coach LeVelle Moton. His mother is Shanda McNair. Although he is an only child, Purvis's mother adopted Tyrek Coger when he was in eighth grade. Coger died after a workout at Oklahoma State University on July 21, 2016.
