= 2012 McDonald's All-American Boys Game =

American high school basketball game

East	West
102	106
	1st half	2nd half	Total
East	46	56	102
West	58	48	106
- Date: March 28, 2012
- Venue: United Center, Chicago, Illinois
- MVP: Shabazz Muhammad
- Network: ESPN
- Announcers: Bob Wischusen (play–by–play); Stephen Bardo & Jay Williams (color commentators)

McDonald's All-American

The 2012 McDonald's All-American Boys Game was an All-star basketball game that was played on Wednesday, March 28, 2012 at the United Center in Chicago, Illinois, home of the Chicago Bulls. The game's rosters featured the best and most highly recruited high school boys graduating in 2012. The game was the 35th annual version of the McDonald's All-American Game first played in 1978. Chicago is the first city to host the game in back-to-back years.

== West Roster ==
#	Name	Height	Weight (lbs.)	Position	Hometown	High school	College choice
10	Brandon Ashley	6'8"	215	F	Oakland, CA	Findlay Prep	Arizona
33	Isaiah Austin	7'0"	210	C	Arlington, TX	Grace Prep	Baylor
22	Anthony Bennett	6'8"	230	F	Brampton, ON	Findlay Prep	UNLV
1	Yogi Ferrell	5'11"	160	G	Greenfield, IN	Park Tudor	Indiana
24	Archie Goodwin	6'5"	180	G	Sherwood, AR	Sylvan Hills	Kentucky
11	Grant Jerrett	6'10"	220	F	La Verne, CA	Lutheran	Arizona
15	Shabazz Muhammad	6'6"	215	F	Las Vegas, NV	Bishop Gorman	UCLA
5	Marcus Paige	6'1"	160	G	Marion, IA	Linn-Mar	North Carolina
21	Devonta Pollard	6'7"	200	F	De Kalb, MS	Kemper County	Alabama
55	Cameron Ridley	6'10"	230	C	Fort Bend, TX	Bush	Texas
3	Marcus Smart	6'4"	200	G	Flower Mound, TX	Marcus	Oklahoma State
35	Rasheed Sulaimon	6'3"	175	G	Houston, TX	Strake Jesuit College Prep	Duke

== East Roster ==
#	Name	Height	Weight (lbs.)	Position	Hometown	High school	College choice
5	Kyle Anderson	6'7"	210	G/F	Fairview, NJ	St. Anthony	UCLA
15	DaJuan Coleman	6'9"	275	C	Dewitt, NY	DeWitt	Syracuse
3	Kris Dunn	6'3"	180	G	New London, CT	New London	Providence
34	Perry Ellis	6'8"	220	F	Wichita, KS	Wichita Heights	Kansas
2	Shaquille Goodwin	6'8"	245	F	Decatur, GA	Southwest DeKalb	Memphis
40	Gary Harris	6'5"	195	G	Indianapolis, IN	Hamilton Southeastern	Michigan State
25	Amile Jefferson	6'7"	190	F	Philadelphia, PA	Friends' Central	Duke
12	Tyler Lewis	5'11"	165	G	Statesville, NC	Oak Hill Academy	NC State
32	Tony Parker	6'9"	270	C	Lithonia, GA	Miller Grove	UCLA
22	Alex Poythress	6'8"	215	F	Clarksville, TN	Northeast	Kentucky
44	Rodney Purvis	6'4"	190	G	Raleigh, NC	Upper Room Christian Academy	NC State
24	T. J. Warren	6'7"	205	F	Durham, NC	Brewster Academy	NC State

=== Coaches ===
The West team was coached by:

- Head coach Gordon Kerkman of Aurora West High School (Aurora, IL)
- Asst coach Rick Thompson of Aurora West High School (Aurora, IL)
- Asst coach Curtis Shaw of Aurora West High School (Aurora, IL)

The East team was coached by:

- Head coach Billy Hicks of Scott County High School (Georgetown, KY)
- Asst coach Chris Willhite of Scott County High School (Georgetown, KY)
- Asst coach Tim Glenn of Scott County High School (Georgetown, KY)

The west team defeated the east team 106-102, with Shabazz Muhammad named the MVP of the game with 21 points and 6 rebounds.

== All-American Week ==
=== Schedule ===
- Monday, March 26: Powerade Jamfest
  - Slam Dunk Contest
  - Three-Point Shoot-out
  - Timed Basketball Skills Competition
- Wednesday, March 28: 35th Annual Boys All-American Game
- Thursday, March 29: 35th Annual Hudson Trophy Presentation

The Powerade JamFest is a skills-competition evening featuring basketball players who demonstrate their skills in three crowd-entertaining ways. The slam dunk contest was first held in 1987, and a 3-point shooting challenge was added in 1989. A timed basketball skills competition was added to the schedule of events in 2009.

=== Contest winners ===
- The 2012 Powerade Slam Dunk contest was won by Shabazz Muhammad. The winner of the 2012 3-point shoot-out was Rasheed Sulaimon. The winner of the basketball skills competition was Tyler Lewis.

== See also ==
- 2012 McDonald's All-American Girls Game
