= Indian Springs High School =

Location
- 650 North Del Rosa Drive; San Bernardino, California 92410; United States; 34°6′41″N 117°15′12″W

Information
- Established: 2012
- School district: San Bernardino City Unified School District
- Principal: Kristen Bicondova
- Staff: 82.44 (FTE)
- Enrollment: 1,829 (2023-2024)
- Student to teacher ratio: 22.19
- Colors: Cardinal red, Vegas gold, white
- Mascot: Coyote
- Website: School website

Indian Springs High School is a comprehensive high school in the San Bernardino City Unified School District, California. The eighth high school built in the district, it opened on August 1, 2012, the first day of the 2012-2013 school year. It was built on the site of the former Curtis Middle School. The school is part of the Freelance League.

== History ==
Official groundbreaking of the $68 million project was March 5, 2010. The 56.4-acre (228,000 m^{2}) site includes 102 classrooms, a gymnasium, performing arts building, multipurpose room, library, child care center, track and field, soccer and baseball fields, outdoor tennis and basketball courts, and a swimming pool. The school will hold about 2,700 students.

The school was named for the region's natural springs, which were known to have been used by the generations of Native Americans who had occupied the area for thousands of years. Chairman James Ramos of the San Manuel Tribe, which was among these, was the principal dedication speaker at the groundbreaking ceremony. “Springs have always played a vital part in Indian culture,” Ramos said, “and Indian people have always played a vital part in California history.”
