= Gridiron Gang =

2006 film directed by Phil Joanou

- Theatrical release poster
- Directed by: Phil Joanou
- Written by: Jeff Maguire
- Produced by: Neal H. Moritz; Lee Stanley
- Starring: Dwayne "The Rock" Johnson; Xzibit; Kevin Dunn; Leon Rippy
- Cinematography: Jeff Cutter
- Edited by: Joel Negron
- Music by: Trevor Rabin
- Production companies: Columbia Pictures; Relativity Media; Original Film; Stanhaven Productions
- Distributed by: Sony Pictures Releasing
- Release date: September 15, 2006
- Running time: 126 minutes
- Country: United States
- Language: English
- Budget: $30 million
- Box office: $41 million

Gridiron Gang is a 2006 American biographical sports drama film directed by Phil Joanou, and starring Dwayne "The Rock" Johnson, Xzibit, Kevin Dunn, Leon Rippy and L. Scott Caldwell. It is loosely based on the true story of the Kilpatrick Mustangs during the 1990 season. The film was released in the United States on September 15, 2006. It was distributed by Sony Pictures Releasing and Columbia Pictures.

== Plot ==
Sean Porter works at Kilpatrick Detention Center in Los Angeles. He is frustrated at not being able to help the kids get away from their life problems when they are released from the center, such as street gangs and drug dealings. Porter intends to create a football team so the teens can feel like they are part of something and believes football will teach them what it takes to be responsible, mature, and disciplined winners.

Porter picks out a few he feels will benefit from this program and requires that they practice with him the following day. He states to his new team, the Kilpatrick Mustangs, "You do it my way, not your way. Your way got you here and you're here because you lost. Right now you are all losers, but if you accept this challenge and stick with the program, you are all going to be winners at the end."

Two of the teens do not get along because they are from rival gangs. William "Willie" Weathers is from the 88's and Kelvin Owens is from the 95's. The first game is against one of the best teams in the league, Barrington Panthers. The game starts out somewhat positive for the Mustangs, as they recover a fumble on the first drive, but matters quickly turn. They are demolished by Barrington, losing by 38 points.

After starting 0–2, the Mustangs start winning games as they learn to work together. Kelvin and Willie finally shake hands when they win a game by one touchdown after Kelvin makes a big block for Willie. Near the end of the season, the Mustangs are headed for the playoffs. They are getting more publicity and more fans along the way.

One of Willie's 88 gang mates, Free, stops by the field. He realizes that Kelvin is a 95. They get into a fight, and Free shoots Kelvin in the shoulder. Before he can put a bullet in Kelvin's head, Willie tackles Free to the ground to save Kelvin. Free is shocked that Willie helped Kelvin and not him.

The police show up, and Free runs off. He fires at the responding officers who fire in return, killing him. Although Kelvin survives the attack, he will not be able to play in the finals. Willie becomes distraught about Free being killed. He even got a fight with one of the inmates C-Co, a member of the 88’s seen hanging with them before Rodger Weathers was killed, after he criticized him for getting his "Homeboy" Free killed, and was sent to the box. Coach Porter visited Willie and told him he was not the same loser he once was when he got there. Kilpatrick is almost forced to forfeit the playoff game due to concerns about further gang violence, and Coach Porter had to convince everyone that football helped the players break away from their usual problems also developing a bond, but Porter's boss steps in and arranges for volunteers from neighboring police departments to patrol the game. The County Sheriff's spokesperson states that "We will do whatever it takes to ensure that gangs do not take over the lives of our youth".

In the playoff game, a rematch against Barrington, the Mustangs go into the half down 14–0. Willie gives a motivational speech, and they go out and beat Barrington on the last play of the game. It is revealed in the narration that they lost the championship game 17–14, but no one called them losers. A few months later, Sean's football method is officially made part of the program.

Almost all the former members of the Mustangs are doing well in their new lives outside the detention center: Willie Weathers is playing football at a top boarding school. Kelvin Owens is playing football for Washington High. Kenny Bates is going to school in Redondo Beach and living with his mother. Junior Palaita got a job working for a furniture company and Leon Hayes is playing football for Dorsey High. However, Miguel Perez and Donald Madlock went back to their old gangs and are now in California youth authority prisons, and Bug Wendal was killed in a drive-by shooting in Compton, California.

In all, 24 of the players are continuing their educations, three are working full-time jobs, and only five are back in jail. The final scene shows a new group of Mustangs training for the next season. Some footage of the 1993 Gridiron Gang documentary is shown during the closing credits.

== Cast ==
- Dwayne "The Rock" Johnson as Coach Sean Porter
- Xzibit as Assistant Coach Malcolm Moore
- Kevin Dunn as Ted Dexter
- Leon Rippy as Paul Higa
- Jade Yorker as Willie Weathers, RB/HB
- Setu Taase as Junior Palaita, FB/HB
- Trever O'Brien as Kenny Bates, WR/DB
- David Thomas as Kelvin Owens, WR/DB
- Mō as Leon Hayes, QB
- Brandon Mychal Smith as 'Bug' Wendal
- Danny Martinez as Miguel Perez, WR/DB
- Michael J. Pagan as Roger Weathers
- Jurnee Smollett as Danyelle Rollins
- Jamal Mixon as Jermaine Evans
- James Earl III as Donald Madlock, OL/DL
- Michael Jace as Mr. Jones
- L. Scott Caldwell as Bobbi Porter
- Anna Maria Horsford as Sharon Weathers
- Brett Cullen as Frank Torrance
- Dan Martin as Terrell Rollins
- Omari Hardwick as 'Free'
- Mary Mara as Mrs. Bates
- Six Reasons as 'C-Co'
- Ambrit Millhouse as Cherise
- Joseph Raymond Lucero, as Chavez #25 Heavily Tattooed Kid

== Production ==
It was set and filmed at Agoura Hills, Camp Kilpatrick, Los Angeles, San Fernando and Westlake Village, California, in 92 days between May 23 and August 23, 2005.

== Reception ==
Rotten Tomatoes reports a 44% approval rating with an average rating of 5.65/10 based on 101 reviews. The website's consensus reads, "The role of probation officer Sean Porter fits Dwayne "The Rock" Johnson like a glove; however, the execution is so clichéd, the youths' stories (based on real events), fail to inspire." On Metacritic, it has a weighted average score of 52 out of 100 based on 25 reviews, indicating "mixed or average" reviews. Audiences polled by CinemaScore gave the film an average grade of "A" on an A+ to F scale.

== Home media ==
The DVD was released in Region 1 in the United States on January 16, 2007, and in Region 2 in the United Kingdom on June 4, 2007.

== See also ==
- List of American football films
- List of teachers portrayed in films
- List of hood films
