= Mark Collins (American football) =

American football player (born 1964)

No. 25, 26
- Position: Cornerback

Personal information
- Born: January 16, 1964 (age 62); St. Louis, Missouri, U.S.
- Listed height: 5 ft 10 in (1.78 m)
- Listed weight: 196 lb (89 kg)

Career information
- High school: Pacific (San Bernardino, California)
- College: Cal State Fullerton
- NFL draft: 1986: 2nd round, 44th overall pick

Career history
- New York Giants (1986–1993); Kansas City Chiefs (1994–1996); Green Bay Packers (1997); Seattle Seahawks (1998)

Awards and highlights
- 2× Super Bowl champion (XXI, XXV); First-team All-Pro (1989); 56th greatest New York Giant of all-time; First-team All-American (1985)

Career NFL statistics
- Interceptions: 27
- Sacks: 8
- Touchdowns: 2
- Stats at Pro Football Reference

Mark Anthony Collins (born January 16, 1964) is an American former professional football player who was a cornerback for 13 years in the National Football League (NFL).

Collins was born in St. Louis, Missouri and played scholastically at Pacific High School in San Bernardino, California. He played collegiately at Cal State Fullerton, where he earned first-team All-American honors as a senior.

Collins was selected by the New York Giants in the second round of the 1986 NFL draft. He spent eight years with the Giants, earning two Super Bowl rings. He also had stints with the Kansas City Chiefs, Green Bay Packers, and Seattle Seahawks.
