= Solomon Byrd =

American football player (born 1999)

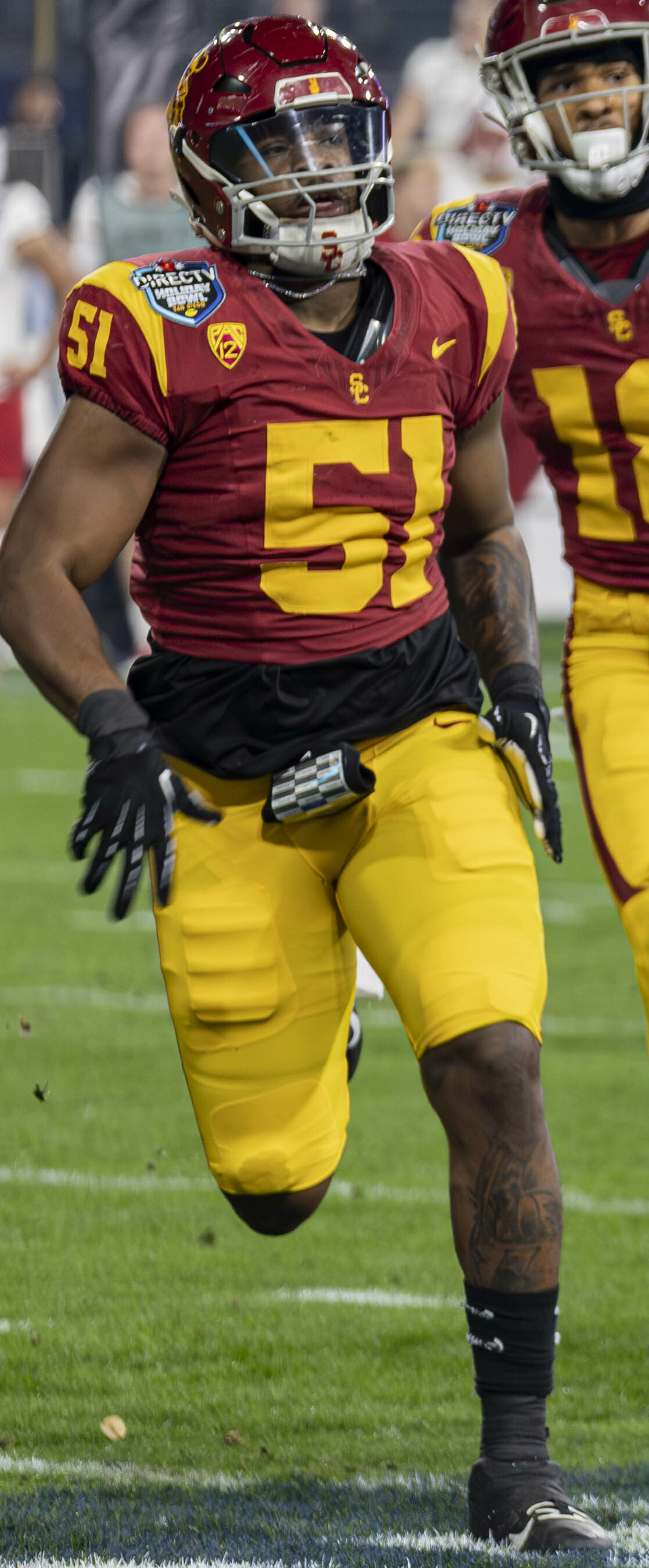
- Byrd at the 2023 Holiday Bowl

No. 50 – Houston Texans
- Position: Defensive end
- Roster status: Injured reserve

Personal information
- Born: December 1, 1999 (age 26); Palmdale, California, U.S.
- Listed height: 6 ft 3 in (1.91 m)
- Listed weight: 250 lb (113 kg)

Career information
- High school: Knight (Palmdale, California)
- College: Wyoming (2018–2021); USC (2022–2023)
- NFL draft: 2024: 7th round, 238th overall pick

Career history
- Houston Texans (2024–present)

Career NFL statistics as of 2025
- Total tackles: 2
- Pass deflections: 1
- Stats at Pro Football Reference

Solomon Byrd (born December 1, 1999) is an American professional football defensive end for the Houston Texans of the National Football League (NFL). He played college football for the Wyoming Cowboys and the USC Trojans and was selected by the Texans in the seventh round of the 2024 NFL draft.

== Early life ==
Byrd was born in Palmdale, California where he attended Knight High School. In Byrd's high school career, he totaled 155 tackles with 20.5 going for a loss, 16 sacks, two fumble recoveries, and six forced fumbles. Byrd would decide to commit to play college football at the University of Wyoming.

== College career ==
=== Wyoming ===
In Byrd's first season with Wyoming in 2018, he had five tackles In week three of the 2019 season, Byrd had a clutch sack to force a punt with three minutes left in the game, as he helped Wyoming beat Idaho 21–16. In the following week, Byrd had a breakout game notching 2.5 sacks, a forced fumble, a fumble recovery, and a pass deflection, in a win over Tulsa. Byrd finished the 2019 season with 45 tackles with 9.5 being for a loss, 6.5 sacks, a pass deflection, a fumble recovery, and a forced fumble. For his performance on the 2019 season, Byrd was named a FWAA Freshman All-American. Byrd would decide to opt out of the 2020 season due to the COVID-19 Pandemic. In the 2021 season, Byrd finished the season with 37 tackles with 3.5 being for a loss, and 3.5 sacks. After the conclusion of the 2021 season, Byrd announced his descison to enter the NCAA transfer portal.

=== USC ===
Byrd would initially decide to transfer to Georgia Tech but would later change his commitment to USC. In week two Byrd had two sacks, in a win over Stanford. In week three, Byrd made his first career start where he made four tackles with two being for a loss, and a sack where he forced a fumble, and recovered it, as he helped USC beat Fresno State. Byrd finished the 2022 season with 28 tackles with 7.5 being for a loss, four sacks, a pass deflection, two fumble recoveries, and a forced fumble.

== Professional career ==
Pre-draft measurables
Height	Weight	Arm length	Hand span	Wingspan	40-yard dash	10-yard split	20-yard split	20-yard shuttle	Three-cone drill	Vertical jump	Broad jump	Bench press
6 ft 2 7/8 in (1.90 m)	255 lb (116 kg)	33 5/8 in (0.85 m)	9 3/4 in (0.25 m)	6 ft 7 7/8 in (2.03 m)	5.01 s	1.84 s	2.97 s	4.59 s	7.45 s	32.0 in (0.81 m)	9 ft 6 in (2.90 m)	18 reps
All values from NFL Combine/Pro Day

Byrd was selected by the Houston Texans in the seventh round (238th overall) of the 2024 NFL draft. He was waived on August 27, 2024, and re-signed to the practice squad. Byrd signed a reserve/future contract with Houston on January 21, 2025.

On August 26, 2025, Byrd was waived by the Texans as part of final roster cuts, and re-signed to the practice squad. On December 3, he was signed to the active roster. Byrd was waived on December 29 and re-signed to the practice squad. On January 20, 2026, he signed a reserve/futures contract with Houston.

On August 30, 2026, Byrd was waived/injured by the Texans after suffering a high ankle sprain.

== Personal life ==
Byrd's uncle, Manfred Moore, played in the NFL from 1974 to 1976, and won Super Bowl XI with the Oakland Raiders. Another uncle, Malcolm Moore played in three games for the Los Angeles Rams during the 1987 NFL season.
