= Crossroads Christian School =

Location
- 2380 Fullerton Ave; Corona, California, 92881; United States of America
- Coordinates: 33°51′2″N 117°33′13″W

Information
- School type: Preschool, Elementary, Middle School, High School, Hybrid Home Schooling
- Denomination: Non-denominational
- Opened: 1978
- Staff: Dr. Joleen Smith, Penny Morrison
- Grades: Preschool - 12
- Gender: Mixed
- Age range: 3-18
- Average class size: 18
- Colours: Black & Red
- Slogan: Home of History Makers and World Changers for the Glory of God
- Sports: Soccer, Football, Baseball, Volleyball, Golf, Cross Country, Softball
- Mascot: Warriors
- Accreditation: ACSI & WASC
- Yearbook: Yes
- Website: www.crossroadsschool.org

Crossroads Christian School is a private, non-denominational Christian school located in Corona, California. It serves approximately 700 students from Preschool to year 12. The school is accredited with ACSI (Association of Christian Schools International) & WASC (Western Association of Schools and Colleges). The school is part of the Freelance League.

== History ==
Crossroads Christian School Association was officially formed in 1978 under the leadership of Roger Harris. The school was opened on the Crossroads Christian Church property on the corner of Rancho Rd. and Main St. The preschool opened in 1979 with half-day and full-day classes for 2-5 year olds. In fall of 1980 Crossroads Christian School added a full Kindergarten class and more preschool classes.

In September 1983 the school purchased 3 acres (12,000 m^{2}) to be able to relocate to a new campus at 1400 Fullerton Ave in the City of Corona and enabled the elementary school to grow and develop and allow the preschool to expand at the old campus.

In 1993 the school purchased a house and a two-story building in front of the Fullerton Ave campus to accommodate the continued growth of the school and was able to add additional classrooms, a school library and computer lab.

In 2003 13 acres (5.3 ha) were purchased on the corner of Fullerton Ave and Ontario Ave next to Crossroads Christian Church to allow for more expansion. The first building was completed on the new property in 2005 which allowed the kindergarten classes to move. Over the next few years more buildings were built and fifty thousand square feet of office and educational space developed. In 2007 the entire school was moved to the new campus. The new campus consists of a sports complex, full service kitchen for cafeteria services, chapel/multipurpose room, and state of the art computer lab. Of the 17 acres (6.9 ha) there is almost 8 acres (3.2 ha) remaining for future growth and development.

== Campus ==
Is located in Corona, California. on the corner of Fullerton Ave and Ontario Ave.
