= Jason Moore (safety) =

American football player (born 1976)

No. 23, 24, 33, 35, 40, 27
- Position: Safety

Personal information
- Born: January 15, 1976 (age 50); San Bernardino, California, U.S.
- Listed height: 5 ft 11 in (1.80 m)
- Listed weight: 200 lb (91 kg)

Career information
- High school: San Bernardino (CA) Pacific
- College: San Diego State
- NFL draft: 1998: undrafted

Career history
- Cincinnati Bengals (1998)*; Denver Broncos (1999); Green Bay Packers (2000); San Francisco 49ers (2000); Barcelona Dragons (2002); Miami Dolphins (2002)*; San Francisco 49ers (2002); Cleveland Browns (2003)*; Los Angeles Avengers (2004)
- * Offseason or practice squad member only

Career NFL statistics
- Tackles: 96
- Stats at Pro Football Reference

Jason Dwayne Moore (born January 15, 1976) is a former safety in the National Football League. He was born and grew up in San Bernardino, CA. Jason attended Pacific High School from 1990 to 1994. There he lettered in track, baseball and football. He helped Pacific become Divisional Champions in baseball and football. Jason earned a scholarship for football at San Diego State University.

At SDSU, he earned a Bachelors of Arts degree in Criminal Justice and a minor in Sociology. Jason became an All-Western Athletic Conference Safety at SDSU. He graduated in 1998 and finished second all time in interceptions (13) and tackles (328). Jason finished third all time in interception return yards (237).

Jason played his first NFL season with the Denver Broncos. His second season was split between the Green Bay Packers and the San Francisco 49ers. He played a season in NFL Europe with the Barcelona Dragons. After returning from overseas, he joined the 49ers for the 2002 NFL season.

Jason is married to Jacqueline and has two children, Jalen and Jordyn.
