= San Bernardino City Unified School District =

School district in California, USA

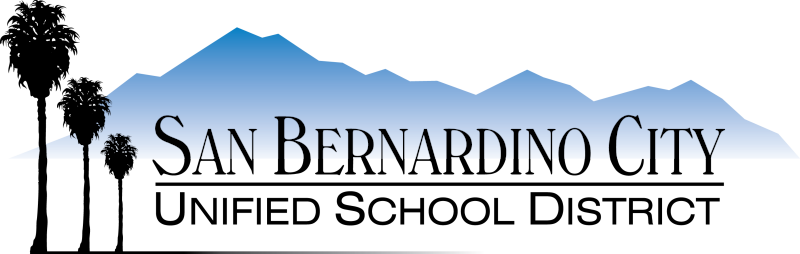

Address
- 777 North F Street San Bernardino, California, 92410; United States

District information
- Type: Public
- Grades: K–12
- Established: July 1, 1964; 62 years ago
- NCES District ID: 0634170

Students and staff
- Students: 44,712 (2023–2024)
- Teachers: 2,167.47 (FTE)
- Staff: 3,748.25 (2021-2022) (FTE)
- Student–teacher ratio: 20.63:1

Other information
- Website: www.sbcusd.com

San Bernardino City Unified School District is a public school district in San Bernardino County, California, that serves most of the city of San Bernardino, the western portion of Highland, the unincorporated community of Muscoy and a small portion of Rialto. The district has an enrollment of approximately 44,712, making it the 17th largest school district in California.

== High schools ==
San Bernardino City Unified School District - High Schools
School name	Address	Year Found/Established	Grades	Team name	School Colors	Principal
Anderson School	24302 East 4th Street, San Bernardino 92410	1971	Special Education Transition Program	Dolphins	Light Grey and Blue	Diane Silva (Special Ed)
Arroyo Valley High School	1881 West Base Line Street, San Bernardino 92411	September 4, 2001	9th-12th	Hawks	Gold, Black and White	Manuel Gonzalez
Cajon High School	1200 West Hill Drive, San Bernardino 92407	1971	9th-12th	Cowboys	Forest Green & Gold	Dr. Christopher Jackson
Indian Springs High School	650 North Del Rosa Drive, San Bernardino 92410	August 4, 2012	9th-12th	Coyotes	Cardinal Red, Vegas Gold and White	Jacob Rosario
Middle College High School	1260 West Esperanza Street, San Bernardino 92410	2001	9th-12th	Wolverines	Light Grey & Dark Blue	James Espinoza
Pacific High School	1020 Pacific Street, San Bernardino 92404	September 1953	9th-12th	Pirates	Purple & White	Dr. Natalie Raymundo
San Andreas High School	3232 Pacific Street, Highland 92346	1951	10th-12th	Quakes	Cyan & White	Dorie Stratton
San Bernardino High School	1850 North E Street, San Bernardino 92405	1891	9th-12th	Cardinals	Red & Black	Persida Torres
San Gorgonio High School	2299 Pacific Street, San Bernardino 92404	1965	9th-12th	Spartans	Blue & Black	Jorge De La Torre
Sierra High School	570 East 9th Street, San Bernardino 92410	1955	9th-12th	Suns	Orange & Blue	Hector Murrieta

== Middle schools ==
San Bernardino City Unified School District - Middle Schools
School name	Address	Grades	Team name	School Colors	Principal
Arrowview Middle School	2299 North G Street, San Bernardino 92405	6th-8th	Dragons	Blue & White	Berenice Rios
Curtis Middle School	1050 North Del Rosa Drive, San Bernardino 92410	7th & 8th	Wildcats	Blue & Yellow	Gabriel Diaz
Del Vallejo Leadership and STEAM Academy	1885 East Lynwood Drive, San Bernardino 92404	6th-8th	Jaguars	Yellow & Blue	Jackie Maner
Dr. Martin Luther King Jr. Middle School	1250 Medical Center Drive, San Bernardino 92411	7th & 8th	Roadrunners	Dark Red & Grey	Ernesto Calles
Golden Valley Middle School	3800 North Waterman Avenue, San Bernardino 92404	6th-8th	Knights	Gold & Black	Carrie Thayer
Magnolia Heights Middle School	6650 North Magnolia Avenue, San Bernardino 92407	6th-8th	Rattlers	Green & Black	Zackary Peters
Paakuma’ K-8 School	17825 Sycamore Creek Loop Parkway, San Bernardino 92407	K-8th	Bears	Blue	Dana Jamison
Richardson PREP HI Middle School	455 South K Street, San Bernardino 92410	6th-8th	Tigers	Orange & Black	Shannon Cabanas
Rodriguez PREP Academy	1985 Guthrie Street, San Bernardino 92404	6th-8th	Eagles	Red, White & Blue	Kathy Mestas
Serrano Middle School	3131 Piedmont Drive, Highland 92346	7th & 8th	Cougars	Gold & Purple	Erin Freeman
Shandin Hills Middle School	4301 Little Mountain Drive, San Bernardino 92407	6th-8th	Trojans	Dark Red & Dijon	Guillermo Guerrero

== Elementary schools ==
San Bernardino City Unified School District - Elementary Schools
School name	Address	Grades	Team name	School Colors	Principal
Antón Elementary School	1501 Anton Court, San Bernardino 92404	TK-6th	Gators	Red & Green	Melanie McGrath
Arrowhead Elementary School	3825 North Mountain View Avenue, San Bernardino 92405	PK-6th	Eagles	Blue & White	Dr. Felicia Noel
Barton Elementary School	2214 Pumalo Street, San Bernardino 92404	TK-6th	Bulldogs	Blue & Orange	Dr. Keith Rojas
Belvedere Elementary School	2501 East Marshall Boulevard, Highland 92346	TK-6th	Bears	Green & White	Sylvette Del Llano
Bing Wong Elementary School	1250 East 9th Street, San Bernardino 92410	PK-6th	Tigers	Orange & Black	Dorothy Sauls
Bob Holcomb Elementary School	1345 West 48th Street, San Bernardino 92407	TK-6th	Mountain Lions	Blue & Silver	Eva Haddad
Bonnie Oehl Elementary School	2525 North Palm Avenue, Highland 92346	K-6th	Bulldogs	Purple & Grey	Dr. Adrienne Ortega
Bradley Elementary School	1300 Valencia Ave, San Bernardino 92404	TK-6th	Bears	Yellow & Blue	Torri Burke
Captain Leland F. Norton Elementary School	747 North Mountain View Avenue, San Bernardino 92401	TK-6th	Aviators	Red, White & Blue	Elizabeth Cochrane-Benoit
Carmack Elementary School	4777 North State Street, San Bernardino 92407	K-6th	N/A	N/A	
Cole Elementary School	1331 North Cole Avenue, Highland 92346	Preschool-6th	Penguins	Black & Yellow	Amanda Manjarrez
Cypress Elementary School	26825 Cypress Street, Highland 92346	Preschool-6th	Crusaders	Cyan & Blue	Jennifer Barber-West
Davidson Elementary School	2844 North Davidson Avenue, San Bernardino 92405	K-6th	Bulldogs	Blue & Grey	Tamara Brown
Del Rosa Elementary School	3395 North Mountain Avenue, San Bernardino 92404	K-6th	Dragons	Grey & Cyan	
Dr. Mildred Dalton Henry Elementary School	1250 West 14th Street, San Bernardino 92411	4th-6th	Trailblazers	Red & Black	Dr. Christopher Tickell
E. Neal Roberts Elementary School	494 East 9th Street, San Bernardino 92410	TK-6th	Koalas	Blue & Sky Blue	Yosan Hailemariam
Emmerton Elementary School	1888 Arden Avenue, San Bernardino 92404	Preschool-3rd	Eagles	Red, White & Blue	Laura Ramos
Fairfax Elementary School	1362 Pacific Street, San Bernardino 92404	K-6th	Falcons	Orange & Deep Sky Blue	Manuel Reyes
George Brown Jr. Elementary School	2525 North G Street, San Bernardino 92405	K-6th	Explorers	Silver, Red & Midnight Blue	Christina Ramirez-Shows
Graciano Gòmez Elementary School	1480 West 11th Street, San Bernardino 92411	PK-6th	Golden Eagles	Orange & Yellow	Maria Martinez
H. Frank Dominguez Elementary School	135 South Allen Street, San Bernardino 92408	TK-6th	Patriots	Red, White & Blue	Keri Bernstine
Highland-Pacific Elementary School	3340 Pacific Street, Highland 92346	TK-6th	Cubs	Red & Orange	Courtney Weber
Hillside University Demonstration School	4975 North Mayfield Avenue, San Bernardino 92407	Preschool-6th	Roadrunners	Dijon & Persian Blue	Becky Quesada
Hunt Elementary School	1342 East Pumalo Street, San Bernardino 92404	Preschool-5th	Huskies	Blue & White	Teresa Hopkins
Inghram Elementary School	1695 West 19th Street, San Bernardino 92411	Preschool-6th	Golden Bears	Orange & Dark Blue	Nertha Arroyo-Goodly
Juanita Blakely Jones Elementary School	700 North F Street, San Bernardino 92410	Preschool-6th	Grizzlies	Forest Green & Orange	Crecia Sims-Robinson
Kendall Elementary School	4951 North State Street, San Bernardino 92407	K-5th	Kangaroos	Navy Blue and Blue	Megan Silva
Kimbark Elementary School	18021 West Kenwood Avenue, San Bernardino 92407	K-6th	Coyotes	Blue and Light Grey	Euridici Fitz
Lankershim Elementary School	7499 Lankershim Avenue, Highland 92346	Preschool-6th	Lions	Yellow and Blue	Interim- Alicia Faz
Lincoln Elementary School	255 West 13th Street, San Bernardino 92405	Preschool-5th	Eagles	Dark Blue and Whitec	Dr. Heather Regalado
Lytle Creek Elementary School	275 South K Street, San Bernardino 92410	K-6th	Lions	Gold, Blue and White	Dr. Carrie Thayer
Manuel A. Salinas Creative Arts Elementary School	2699 North California Street, San Bernardino 92407	TK-5th	N/A	N/A	Ramon Velasco
Marshall Elementary School	3288 North G Street, San Bernardino 92405	TK-6th	Mustangs	Brown & Blue	Deborah Grant
Monterey Elementary School	794 Monterey Avenue, San Bernardino 92410	Preschool-6th	Eagles	Red, White & Blue	Erika Rios
Mt. Vernon Elementary School	1271 West 10th Street, San Bernardino 92411	Preschool-6th	Bees	Black & Yellow	Sharon Alvarado
Muscoy Elementary School	2119 Blake Street, San Bernardino 92407	K-6th	Mustangs	Silver & Light Blue	Juan Ortiz
Newmark Elementary School	4121 North 3rd Avenue, San Bernardino 92407	Preschool-6th	Knights	Sky Blue & Silver	Dr. Emily Ledesma
North Park Elementary School	5378 North H Street, San Bernardino 92407	TK-6th	Coyotes	Brown & Dark Red	Colleen Maroney
North Verdemont Elementary School	3555 West Meyers Road, San Bernardino 92407	TK-6th	Eagles	Red, White & Blue	Harold Olivo
Palm Avenue Elementary School	6565 Palm Avenue, San Bernardino 92407	K-6th	Panthers	Blue & Black	Dr. Janice Gordon
Parkside Elementary School	3775 North Waterman Avenue, San Bernardino 92404	TK-6th	Panthers	Black & Yellow	Lori Simanek
Ramona-Alessandro Elementary School	670 Ramona Avenue, San Bernardino 92411	K-6th	Tigers	Orange & Black	Reginald "Tony" Thomas
Riley College Prep Academy	1266 North G Street, San Bernardino 92405	TK—5th	Bears	N/A	Jaime Arias
Rio Vista Elementary School	1451 North California Street, San Bernardino 92411	Preschool-6th	Rams	Silver & Cyan	Mitzi Moreland
Roosevelt Elementary School	1554 North Garner Avenue, San Bernardino 92411	K-3rd	Eagles	Dark Blue & Yellow	Ryan Knutson
Thompson Elementary School	7401 Church Avenue, Highland 92346	TK-6th	Tigers	Orange & Black	Vilma Sandoval
Urbita Elementary School	771 South J Street, San Bernardino 92410	Preschool-6th	Eagles	Yellow & Green	Dennis Wolbert
Vermont Elementary School	3695 Vermont Street, San Bernardino 92407	Preschool-6th	Lions	Blue & Yellow	Tamara Brown
Warm Springs Elementary School	7497 Sterling Avenue, San Bernardino 92410	K-6th	Dolphins	Blue & Yellow	Natalie Morales
Wilson Elementary School	2894 Belle Street, San Bernardino 92404	K-5th	Wildcats	Turquoise & Black	Robert Madrigal
Yvonne Harmon School	4865 North State Street, San Bernardino 92407	Preschool/TK/PK	Kangaroos	Navy Blue and Blue	CLOSED INDEFINETELY

Norton Elementary opened in 2012. Burbank Elementary School opened in 1935 and closed permanently in May 2012. In its final month it had 393 students. The majority of its students were scheduled to move to Norton Elementary.

== Charters schools ==
San Bernardino City Unified School District - Charter Schools
School name	Address	Grades	Principal
ASA Charter School	3512 North E Street, San Bernardino 92405	TK-12	Susan Lucey
Ballington Academy for the Arts and Sciences	799 East Rialto Avenue, San Bernardino 92408	TK-5th	Shannon Bradner
Entrepreneur High School	26655 Highland Avenue, Highland 92346	9th-10th	Herald Watson
Hardy Brown College Prep	655 West 2nd Street, San Bernardino 92401	TK-8th	Toiya Allen
iEmpire Academy	2050 Pacific Street, San Bernardino 92404	T-5th	Steve Dowding
New Vision Middle School	26655 Highland Avenue, Highland 92346	6th-8th	Derrick Bass
Options for Youth #1	985 South E Street, San Bernardino 92408 (Suite A)	7th-12th	Richard Aguilar
Options for Youth #2	1148 East Highland Avenue, San Bernardino 92404	7th-12th	Richard Aguilar
Options for Youth #3	1136 North Mt. Vernon Avenue, San Bernardino 92411	7th-12th	Richard Aguilar
PAL Charter Academy	2450 Blake Street, San Bernardino 92407; 1691 North Sierra Way, San Bernardino 92405	9th-12th	Christopher Kirkpatrick
PAL Charter Academy Middle School	2450 Blake Street, San Bernardino 92407; 1691 North Sierra Way, San Bernardino 92405	6th-8th	Jason Patterson
Public Safety Academy	1482 Enterprise Drive, San Bernardino 92408	6th-12th	Jennifer Stickel
Savant Preparatory Academy of Business	1406 Pacific Street, San Bernardino 92404	TK-5th	Eva Tillman
SOAR Charter Academy	198 West Mill Street, San Bernardino 92408	K-8th	Susan Dryden
Woodward Leadership Academy	1777 West Base Line Street, San Bernardino 92411	K-6th	Jackie Johnson

== Other schools ==
San Bernardino City Unified School District - Other Schools
School name	Address	Grades	Principal
Alternative Learning Center	3236 Pacific Street, Highland 92346	1st-12th	Robyn L. Eberhardt
Child Development Program	1535 West Highland Avenue, San Bernardino 92411	Preschool	Latashia Kelly
Destination Deploma	3232 Pacific Street, Highland 92346	9th-12th	Dorie Stratton
Inland Career Education Center	1200 North E Street, San Bernardino 92405		Leticia Villa
