= Ryan Nece =

American football player (born 1979)

No. 56, 55
- Position: Linebacker

Personal information
- Born: February 24, 1979 (age 47); San Bernardino, California, U.S.
- Listed height: 6 ft 3 in (1.91 m)
- Listed weight: 224 lb (102 kg)

Career information
- High school: Pacific (San Bernardino)
- College: UCLA
- NFL draft: 2002: undrafted

Career history
- Tampa Bay Buccaneers (2002–2007); Detroit Lions (2008)

Awards and highlights
- Super Bowl champion (XXXVII)

Career NFL statistics
- Total tackles: 307
- Sacks: 5.0
- Fumble recoveries: 1
- Pass deflections: 10
- Interceptions: 3
- Stats at Pro Football Reference

Ryan Clint Nece (born February 24, 1979) is an American former professional football player who was a linebacker in the National Football League (NFL). He played college football for the UCLA Bruins and was signed by the Tampa Bay Buccaneers as an undrafted free agent in 2002. Nece is the son of Pro Football Hall of Fame safety Ronnie Lott.

Nece is a community activist involved in many charities throughout the Tampa Bay area. He is on the board of the Tampa Bay Sports Authority and Tampa's Lowry Park Zoo. In 2006, he created his own foundation "The Ryan Nece Foundation", funding programs for youth and families.

Nece is also the co-founder and managing partner at Next Legacy Partners, a Fund of funds in Palo Alto, California.

== Early life ==
Ryan Clint Nece was born on February 24, 1979, in San Bernardino, California. Nece attended Pacific High School (San Bernardino, California), where he claimed prestigious titles of All-City honors and team MVP, while also taking on the role of team captain as both a junior and senior. In addition to that, he received all-league honors in basketball and track and field.

== College career ==
Nece graduated from the University of California, Los Angeles (UCLA) and was a four-year starter for the Bruins and finished his career with 281 career tackles (173 solo), with 22 tackles for loss and 10 sacks. He started out in his redshirt year as a safety but converted to linebacker afterwards. In just his first year, he secured a first-team Freshman All-American honors. The following year, 1999, he finished third on the team with 65 stops. In his junior year, despite playing with a shoulder that required surgery, he was selected for the 2000 pre-season Watch List for the Butkus Award. In his final year at UCLA, he was awarded an honorable mention for All-Pac-10 selection and Butkus Award semifinalist.

== Professional career ==
=== Tampa Bay Buccaneers ===
Nece tore his ACL in his rookie year, ending his season after being a stalwart special teams tackler throughout the season. In 2003, Nece moved into the starting spot across star linebacker Derrick Brooks and finished the season with 70 tackles and one interception.

During his time with the Buccaneers, Nece played 101 games, won the Super Bowl XXXVII, and totaled 212 tackles. He was released by the Buccaneers during final cuts on August 30, 2008.

=== Detroit Lions ===
On August 31, 2008, Nece was signed by the Detroit Lions. The move reunited him with Lions head coach Rod Marinelli, who was an assistant coach for the Buccaneers during Nece's first four seasons in Tampa Bay. Nece was released by the Lions in the 2009 off-season.

With Marc Isenberg, Nece is the co-author of Go Pro Like a Pro, a small booklet from 2011 created for athletes, their parents, and others who influence, advise, and work on athletes’ behalf.

== NFL career statistics ==
Legend
**Bold**	Career high

=== Regular season ===
Year	Team	Games		Tackles					Interceptions					Fumbles			
Year	Team	GP	GS	Cmb	Solo	Ast	Sck	TfL	Int	Yds	TD	Lng	PD	FF	FR	Yds	TD
2002	TB	8	0	10	7	3	0.0	0	0	0	0	0	0	0	0	0	0
2003	TB	15	10	62	**47**	15	0.0	0	**1**	2	0	2	3	0	0	0	0
2004	TB	**16**	0	12	10	2	0.0	0	**1**	2	0	2	1	0	**1**	0	0
2005	TB	**16**	**14**	**74**	46	**28**	**2.0**	**6**	0	0	0	0	0	0	0	0	0
2006	TB	15	11	65	46	19	1.5	**6**	0	0	0	0	2	0	0	0	0
2007	TB	15	0	16	14	2	0.0	0	0	0	0	0	0	0	0	0	0
2008	DET	**16**	10	68	45	23	1.5	4	**1**	**18**	0	**18**	**4**	0	0	0	0
Career		101	45	307	215	92	5.0	16	3	22	0	18	10	0	1	0	0

=== Playoffs ===
Year	Team	Games		Tackles					Interceptions					Fumbles			
Year	Team	GP	GS	Cmb	Solo	Ast	Sck	TfL	Int	Yds	TD	Lng	PD	FF	FR	Yds	TD
2005	TB	**1**	**1**	4	3	**1**	0.0	**1**	0	0	0	0	0	0	0	0	0
2007	TB	**1**	**1**	**5**	**4**	**1**	0.0	0	0	0	0	0	0	0	0	0	0
Career		2	2	9	7	2	0.0	1	0	0	0	0	0	0	0	0	0

== Broadcasting career ==
The United Football league announced on September 14, 2010, that Nece would be doing sideline reporting during live games on the Versus network. He joined the Pac-12 Network as a sideline reporter and football analyst in 2012.

== StraightCast media ==
In 2010, Nece and former teammate Jeb Terry founded Straightcast Media, a technology which was used by more than 200 NFL players to capture mobile video that could be shared across multiple platforms, including television, digital, and social media. In 2015, Fox Sports announced that it had acquired assets from StraightCast Media. Following the acquisition, Nece worked at Fox Sports as a football analyst.

== Venture capital ==
During his time as a broadcaster and entrepreneur, Nece was simultaneously a Principal at Arenda Capital Management, a private investment firm in Los Angeles, California, and a Partner at Provident Investment Advisor. Following these investment experiences, Nece went on to co-found Next Play Capital, a minority-owned and led Venture Capital firm that had given investors access to top-tier, access constrained venture funds and venture-backed companies across their full lifecycle. During this time, Nece was an early investor in Tonal, FanDuel, Rubrik, Stemcentrx, and Pure Storage. In 2023, the firm had joined forces with Legacy Ventures, under the new name of Next Legacy Partners.

== Community activism ==
In 2006, as a way to formalize his own charitable contributions to the community, Nece started the Ryan Nece Foundation, an organization that empowers teens to embrace the "Power of Giving" through volunteerism and inspirational leadership programs. Nece actively serves as the chairman to this day.

Nece also serves as the founder and chairman of NextPlayU, a virtual training program designed for athletes that are transitioning into careers after sports.

== Personal life ==
Nece was raised by his parents, Ronnie Lott and Cathy Nece. His parents chose to give him his mother's maiden name with the hopes he would create his own identity and avoid expectations from being Lott's son. Nece and Lott became the second father-and-son duo to both win a Super Bowl, joining Bob and Brian Griese. Nece is married to actress and singer Willa Ford. They held a wedding ceremony in April 2015. In March 2016, it was announced that the couple was expecting their first child. In 2016, they welcomed a son.
