= Manfred Moore =

American football and rugby league player (1950–2020)

No. 26, 45, 36, 44
- Position: Running back

Personal information
- Born: December 22, 1950; Martinez, California, U.S.
- Died: January 11, 2020 (aged 69)
- Listed height: 6 ft 1 in (1.85 m)
- Listed weight: 197 lb (89 kg)

Career information
- High school: San Fernando (San Fernando, California)
- College: USC
- NFL draft: 1974: 9th round, 216th overall pick

Career history
- San Francisco 49ers (1974–1975); Tampa Bay Buccaneers (1976); Oakland Raiders (1976); Newtown Jets (RL) (1977); Minnesota Vikings (1977)

Awards and highlights
- Super Bowl champion (XI); National champion (1972)

Career NFL statistics
- Rushing attempts-yards: 20-38
- Receptions-yards: 9-94
- Touchdowns: 1
- Stats at Pro Football Reference

Manfred Moore
Playing information
- Position: wing
Club
Years	Team	Pld	T	G	FG	P
1977	Newtown Jets	5	1	0	0	3

Manfred Moore (December 22, 1950 – January 11, 2020) was an American professional football running back and, briefly, rugby league player who played in the 1970s.

== Early life ==
Moore was born in Martinez, California. He graduated from San Fernando High School in San Fernando, California. He played college football for the University of Southern California.

== Professional career ==
=== NFL career ===
Moore was a ninth round selection (216th overall) in the 1974 NFL draft by the San Francisco 49ers. He played for the 49ers in 1974 and 1975, being named their special teams player of the year in both seasons. He then spent the 1976 NFL season with the Tampa Bay Buccaneers, after being selected by them in the 1976 NFL expansion draft. Near the end of the 1976 season he was cut by the winless Buccaneers (0–13 at that point) and signed by the Oakland Raiders to replace their injured kick returner Rick Jennings.

=== Switch to rugby league ===
Following his Super Bowl appearance, Moore was recruited by Australian New South Wales Rugby Football League premiership team the Newtown Jets for the 1977 NSWRFL season, with the move being financed by John Singleton. He made his first grade debut just 98 days after the Super Bowl, playing on the wing against the Western Suburbs Magpies before 5,743 spectators at Henson Park. He impressed on debut, scoring the club's first try of the season. This made him the first, and to date only, person to score a first grade rugby league try in Australia and an NFL touchdown in the US. Moore lasted only four games in the NSWRFL; he was relegated to reserve grade and played in the second row before receiving a head injury in a match against Penrith which prompted him to return to the National Football League prematurely.

=== Return to the NFL ===
Moore returned to the National Football League with the Minnesota Vikings, playing twelve games in the 1977 NFL season.

== Personal life ==
Moore's brother Malcolm, played in 3 games for the Los Angeles Rams during the 1987 NFL season. His nephew, Solomon Byrd, currently plays in the NFL for the Houston Texans.
