= Gridiron Gang (1993 film) =

- Directed by: Lee Stanley
- Written by: Jac Flanders; Lee Stanley (Narration)
- Produced by: Linda Stanley; Lee Stanley
- Starring: Louis Gossett Jr.
- Production company: Stanhaven Productions
- Distributed by: Western International Syndication
- Release date: 1993
- Running time: 96 minutes
- Country: USA
- Language: English

Gridiron Gang is a 1993 documentary film about the Kilpatrick Mustangs' inaugural season in 1990. The film won an Outstanding Individual Achievement Award in Information Programming at the 43rd Primetime Emmy Awards. Louis Gossett Jr. hosted the documentary. Several scenes from the film are shown during the credits of the 2006 film Gridiron Gang, which was based on the Mustangs' 1990 season.
