= Shabazz Muhammad =

American basketball player (born 1992)

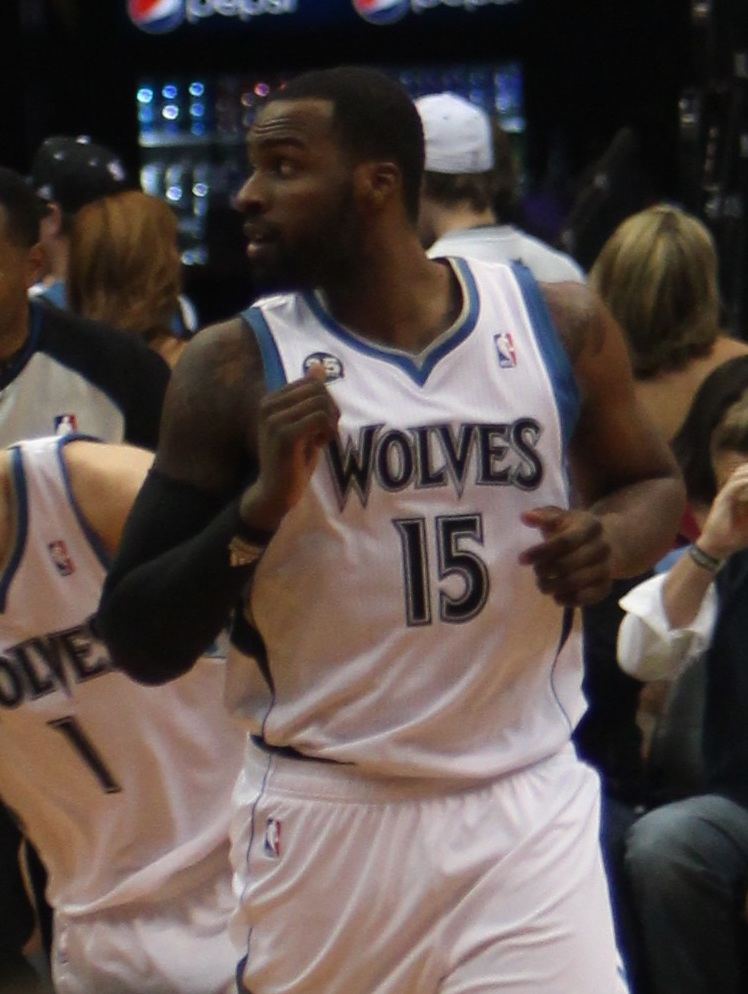
- Muhammad with the Minnesota Timberwolves in 2014

No. 24 – Piratas de La Guaira
- Position: Shooting guard / small forward
- League: Superliga Profesional de Baloncesto

Personal information
- Born: November 13, 1992 (age 34) Long Beach, California, U.S.
- Listed height: 6 ft 6 in (1.98 m)
- Listed weight: 222 lb (101 kg)

Career information
- High school: Bishop Gorman (Las Vegas, Nevada)
- College: UCLA (2012–2013)
- NBA draft: 2013: 1st round, 14th overall pick
- Drafted by: Utah Jazz
- Playing career: 2013–present

Career history
- 2013–2018: Minnesota Timberwolves
- 2014: →Iowa Energy
- 2018: Milwaukee Bucks
- 2018–2019: Shanxi Brave Dragons
- 2019: Shenzhen Aviators
- 2021: Grand Rapids Gold
- 2022: San Miguel Beermen
- 2023: Beirut Club
- 2023: Guangdong Southern Tigers
- 2023: Beirut Club
- 2023: Al-Muharraq
- 2024: Stockton Kings
- 2024: Trotamundos de Carabobo
- 2024: Magnolia Chicken Timplados Hotshots
- 2024–2025: Sagesse Club
- 2025: Hangtuah Jakarta
- 2025–2026: Beirut Club
- 2026–present: Piratas de La Guaira

Career highlights
- Second-team All-American – SN (2013); First-team All-Pac-12 (2013); Pac-12 co-Freshman of the Year (2013); Naismith Prep Player of the Year (2012); Morgan Wootten National Player of the Year (2012); Mr. Basketball USA (2012); McDonald's All-American Game MVP (2012); First-team Parade All-American (2012)
- Stats at NBA.com
- Stats at Basketball Reference

Shabazz Nagee Muhammad (born November 13, 1992) is an American professional basketball player for the Piratas de La Guaira of the Superliga Profesional de Baloncesto (SPB). He played one season of college basketball for the UCLA Bruins before being selected with the 14th overall pick in the 2013 NBA draft.

Muhammad went to Bishop Gorman High School, where he was named Mr. Basketball USA and Naismith Prep Player of the Year in his senior year. He was one of the top rated college basketball recruits in the class of 2012. In his only season with UCLA, he earned All-American honors and was named to the all-conference first team in the Pac-12; he was also voted Pac-12 co-Freshman of the Year.

== Early life ==
Muhammad was born in Long Beach, California to Ron Holmes and Faye Muhammad. Ron Holmes was a 6-foot-5-inch (1.96 m) standout, four-year starting point guard for the USC Trojans men's basketball program in the 1980s. Muhammad's mother, Faye, was a point guard and track star at Long Beach State.

Shabazz Muhammad is the second of three children. His older sister Asia is a professional tennis player, and his younger brother Rashad played basketball in high school. When Muhammad was six years old, he was diagnosed with Tourette syndrome.

== High school career ==
Muhammad attended high school in Las Vegas Valley in Nevada at Bishop Gorman High School, a Catholic high school with a $12,000 annual tuition that possessed a competitive athletics program. He became one of the few freshman to make their varsity basketball team. In his junior year, Muhammad led Bishop Gorman averaging 25.1 points and 7.7 rebounds for the season. Muhammad was also named the 2011 Gatorade Player of the Year for the state of Nevada.

Muhammad was the 2011–12 high school diary keeper for SLAM Magazine.

Muhammad played in the 2012 McDonald's All-American game, where he led the West team to a 106–102 victory over the East team, and was named the MVP of the game with 21 points and 6 rebounds. Muhammad also participated in and won the 2012 Powerade Jam Fest Dunk Contest. He was rated as the No. 2 player in the class of 2012 in the ESPNU 100, the No. 2 player by Scout.com, and the No. 1 player by Rivals.com. CBS college basketball analyst Greg Anthony called Muhammad a "once-in-a-generation talent."

== College career ==
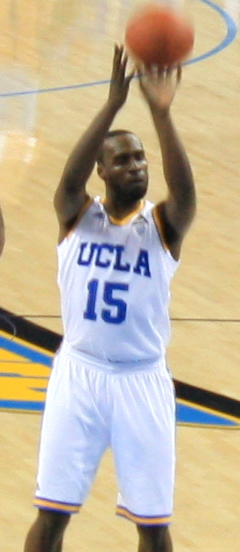
Muhammad with UCLA in 2012.

Boasting scholarship offers from scores of basketball programs, Muhammad's final list of schools was Duke, Kentucky, and UCLA. On April 11, 2012, Muhammad announced he would attend UCLA. Muhammad was declared ineligible to play hours prior to UCLA's 2012–13 season opener against Indiana State due to alleged violations involving the NCAA's amateurism rules surrounding unofficial university visits. The NCAA ruled he had received benefits for travel expenses and lodging from family friend Benjamin Lincoln, who had befriended Muhammad's father when Muhammad was in seventh grade, during unofficial visits to Duke and North Carolina. After missing three games and an appeal by UCLA, he was reinstated, and his family was required to repay approximately $1,600. Days before his reinstatement, several media outlets reported the boyfriend of the NCAA's lead investigator boasted publicly that the NCAA would find him ineligible eight days after the investigation commenced. The NCAA subsequently fired the investigator that was involved in the case.

Muhammad scored 15 points off the bench in his debut in a 78–70 loss to Georgetown in the semifinals of the Legends Classic. He became a starter in the next game against Georgia, and he scored a game-high 21 points in a 60–56 win in the Classic's consolation game. Muhammad would then get a college-high 27 points, including a game-winning three pointer, in a 97–95 overtime victory against No. 7 Missouri. He scored a game-high 23 points in an 84–73 road win over No. 6 Arizona.

Muhammad received national recognition, earning second-team All-American honors from Sporting News and a Freshman All-American selection by the United States Basketball Writers Association (USBWA). He was also named to the All-Pac-12 first team, and was voted the Pac-12 co-Freshman of the Year along with Jahii Carson of Arizona State. Muhammad finished the season averaging 17.9 points, 5.2 rebounds, 0.8 assists, 0.7 steals, and 0.1 blocks per game. He shot 44.3% from the floor and made 71.1% of his free throws. While his scoring ability was unquestionable, he was not the flashy offensive player that was expected upon his signing. Muhammad struggled in the postseason, shooting 39.7 percent (23-for-58) and averaging 15.3 points in four games. He was 0-for-10 on three-point field goals. During the season, he focused on shooting and rarely passed the ball. He was also a weak defensive player, though he did show improvement.

== Professional career ==
=== Minnesota Timberwolves (2013–2018) ===
==== 2013–14 season ====
On April 16, 2013, Muhammad declared he would enter the 2013 NBA draft. While he began his college career projected as a top-three draft pick, his stock fell to being viewed as a back-end lottery pick. Muhammad was drafted 14th overall by the Utah Jazz; afterwards, his draft rights were traded to the Minnesota Timberwolves along with the 21st pick, Gorgui Dieng, in exchange for the ninth pick, Trey Burke. While attending the NBA's rookie transition program in August before the season, Muhammad was sent home due to a rules violation.

On January 5, 2014, Muhammad was assigned to the Iowa Energy of the NBA Development League. In four games with Iowa, he averaged 24.5 points, shot 57.1% from the field, and had 9.8 rebounds per game. He played in the D-League Showcase, and was named to the All-Showcase Team. On January 13, he was recalled by the Timberwolves. On February 8, with three teammates out injured, Muhammad scored 12 points in a 117–110 loss to the Portland Trail Blazers. After playing sparingly for the Wolves most of the season, it was his first game playing over 10 minutes. On February 25, Muhammad played a season-high 24 minutes and scored a season-high 20 points in a 110–101 win over the Phoenix Suns; he scored 10 points while playing the entire fourth quarter, and also had five of his six rebounds during that time. On April 5, he sprained the medial collateral ligament (MCL) of his right knee against the Miami Heat, which forced him to miss the remainder of the season. He averaged 3.9 points per game for the season.

==== 2014–15 season ====
During the offseason, Muhammad lost weight and tuned his offensive game, and he enjoyed an improved season in 2014–15 before suffering injuries. On December 30, 2014, Muhammad scored a then career-high 30 points in a 100–94 loss to Utah. On January 9, 2015, he missed the fourth quarter against the Milwaukee Bucks after suffering a strained external oblique. The injury sidelined him for a month after he had been performing well, averaging 16.9 points and 4.9 rebounds over his previous 20 games. Despite the injury, Muhammad was selected to participate in the Rising Stars Challenge during the 2015 NBA All-Star Weekend. On February 21, 2015, he was ruled out for the rest of the season after requiring surgery for a torn ligament in his middle finger.

==== 2015–16 season ====
Muhammad was able to stay healthy throughout 2015–16, playing in all 82 games. He saw his minutes dip slightly, as he managed 20.5 minutes per game compared to 22.8 mpg in 2014–15. As a result, Muhammad's scoring fell by three points per game and his three-point shooting fell almost all the way back to his rookie season level—he was taking threes at a higher rate in 2015–16 than in his first two seasons combined. He finished with an average of 10.5 points per game and even set a career high during the season with 35 points on April 5 in a 124–117 overtime win over the Golden State Warriors. While his offense remained steady, Muhammad's defense was considered statistically poor. Among 462 qualified players in 2015–16, Muhammad ranked 461st in ESPN's "Defensive Real Plus-Minus" statistic, ahead of only J.J. Barea.

==== 2016–17 season ====
Muhammad continued to struggle on the defensive end in 2016–17, which made it difficult for him to earn the confidence of coach Tom Thibodeau over the first two months of the season. He broke out on December 30, 2016, scoring 22 points in 18 minutes off the bench against the Milwaukee Bucks. He scored 10 first-quarter points against the Bucks and hit his first four three-pointers of the game to help lead the Timberwolves to a 116–99 win.

==== 2017–18 season ====
On September 15, 2017, Muhammad re-signed with the Timberwolves. On February 23, 2018, he played his final game of the season for Minnesota, logging four points in three minutes during a 120–102 loss to the Houston Rockets. On March 1, he was waived by the Timberwolves. Muhammad reportedly requested to leave the franchise a month earlier.

=== Milwaukee Bucks (2018) ===
On March 4, 2018, Muhammad signed with the Milwaukee Bucks. On April 9, he scored a season-high 22 points in a 102–86 win over the Orlando Magic. During the offseason, he re-signed with the Bucks on a training-camp deal. He was waived in the preseason on October 11, 2018, after playing in two exhibition games.

=== Shanxi Brave Dragons (2018–2019) ===
On October 12, 2018, Muhammad signed with the Shanxi Brave Dragons of the Chinese Basketball Association. On October 27, 2018, Muhammad made his debut for Shanxi, contributed 26 points, 13 rebounds, 3 assists, and 1 steal in a 98–92 loss to the Tianjin Golden Lions. On January 5, 2019, Muhammad scored 60 points to go along with 15 rebounds in a 127–118 loss to the Guangsha Lions.

=== Shenzhen Aviators (2019) ===
On August 15, 2019, Muhammad signed with the Shenzhen Aviators of the Chinese Basketball Association (CBA).

=== Grand Rapids Gold (2021) ===
In November 2021, Muhammad signed with the Meralco Bolts of the Philippine Basketball Association (PBA). However, he canceled his trip to the Philippines because of a 'family emergency'.

On December 19, 2021, Muhammad signed with the Grand Rapids Gold of the NBA G League. However, he was waived on December 22.

=== San Miguel Beermen (2022) ===
In February 2022, Muhammad joined the San Miguel Beermen of the PBA for the 2021 PBA Governors' Cup as a replacement for Orlando Johnson. On March 5, 2022, Muhammad recorded 57 points and 19 rebounds as he helped the Beermen come back from 26 points down in a 115–110 win against the Meralco Bolts.

=== Beirut Club (2023) ===
On February 25, 2023, Muhammad signed with Beirut Club of the Lebanese Basketball League (LBL).

=== Guangdong Southern Tigers (2023) ===
On April 5, 2023, Muhammad signed with the Guangdong Southern Tigers of the Chinese Basketball Association (CBA).

=== Stockton Kings (2024) ===
On January 15, 2024, Muhammad joined the Stockton Kings of the NBA G League, but was waived on February 3. Two days later, he was reacquired by the Kings.

=== Trotamundos de Carabobo (2024) ===
On July 21, 2024, Muhammad signed with Trotamundos de Carabobo of the Superliga Profesional de Baloncesto.

=== Magnolia Chicken Timplados Hotshots (2024) ===
On September 6, 2024, Muhammad returns to the Philippines as he signed with the Magnolia Chicken Timplados Hotshots of the PBA to replace Glenn Robinson III as the team's import for the 2024 PBA Governors' Cup.

=== Sagesse SC (2024–present) ===
On December 22, 2024, Muhammad signed with the Sagesse SC of the Lebanese Basketball League.

== Personal life ==
Muhammad's uncle, Stephone Paige, played nine seasons in the National Football League (NFL) with 377 career receptions. His aunt, Robin Holmes-Sullivan, was a four-year starter for Cal State Fullerton's basketball team.

On March 22, 2013, it was revealed in a report from the Los Angeles Times that Muhammad was actually born exactly one year earlier than his thought-to-be birthday of November 13, 1993. A copy of his birth certificate on file with the Los Angeles County Department of Public Health shows that he was born at Long Beach Memorial Medical Center exactly one year earlier, which made him 20 years old at the time. Los Angeles Times assumes that this was to make Muhammad look better "competing against younger, smaller athletes, particularly in the fast-growing years of early adolescence", and compared the case to that of baseball's Danny Almonte. Although Muhammad's father said the younger age in UCLA's media guide was "a mistake", numerous sources online show that Muhammad had been passing himself off as younger for years.

== Career statistics ==
Legend
GP	Games played	GS	Games started	MPG	Minutes per game
FG%	Field goal percentage	3P%	3-point field goal percentage	FT%	Free throw percentage
RPG	Rebounds per game	APG	Assists per game	SPG	Steals per game
BPG	Blocks per game	PPG	Points per game	**Bold**	Career high
*	Led the league

=== NBA ===
==== Regular season ====
Year	Team	GP	GS	MPG	FG%	3P%	FT%	RPG	APG	SPG	BPG	PPG
2013–14	Minnesota	37	0	7.8	.460	.273	.650	1.4	.2	.2	.0	3.9
2014–15	Minnesota	38	**13**	**22.8**	.489	**.392**	.717	**4.1**	**1.2**	**.5**	**.2**	**13.5**
2015–16	Minnesota	**82***	0	20.5	.465	.289	.764	3.3	.6	.3	.1	10.5
2016–17	Minnesota	78	1	19.4	.482	.338	.774	2.8	.4	.3	.1	9.9
2017–18	Minnesota	32	2	9.4	.388	.211	.710	1.4	.2	.2	.1	3.8
2017–18	Milwaukee	11	0	10.6	**.552**	.375	**.895**	2.8	.6	.4	.1	8.5
Career		278	16	17.2	.473	.319	.751	2.8	.5	.3	.1	9.0

==== Playoffs ====
Year	Team	GP	GS	MPG	FG%	3P%	FT%	RPG	APG	SPG	BPG	PPG
2018	Milwaukee	4	0	7.3	.450	.800	.600	1.0	.0	.5	.3	6.3
Career		4	0	7.3	.450	.800	.600	1.0	.0	.5	.3	6.3

=== International ===
Legend
GP	Games played	MPG	Minutes per game	FG%	Field goal percentage
3P%	3-point field goal percentage	FT%	Free throw percentage	RPG	Rebounds per game
APG	Assists per game	SPG	Steals per game	BPG	Blocks per game
PPG	Points per game	**Bold**	Career high		Led the league

Year	Team	League	GP	MPG	FG%	3P%	FT%	RPG	APG	SPG	BPG	PPG
2018–19	Shanxi Loongs	CBA	41	31.9	.518	.311	.811	11.2	2.8	.6	.8	29.8
2019–20	Shenzhen Aviators	CBA	10	29.9	.561	.419	.759	9.3	1.5	.8	.5	23.5

=== College ===
Year	Team	GP	GS	MPG	FG%	3P%	FT%	RPG	APG	SPG	BPG	PPG
2012–13	UCLA	32	30	30.8	.443	.377	.711	5.2	.8	.7	.1	17.9

== Awards and honors ==
=== High school ===
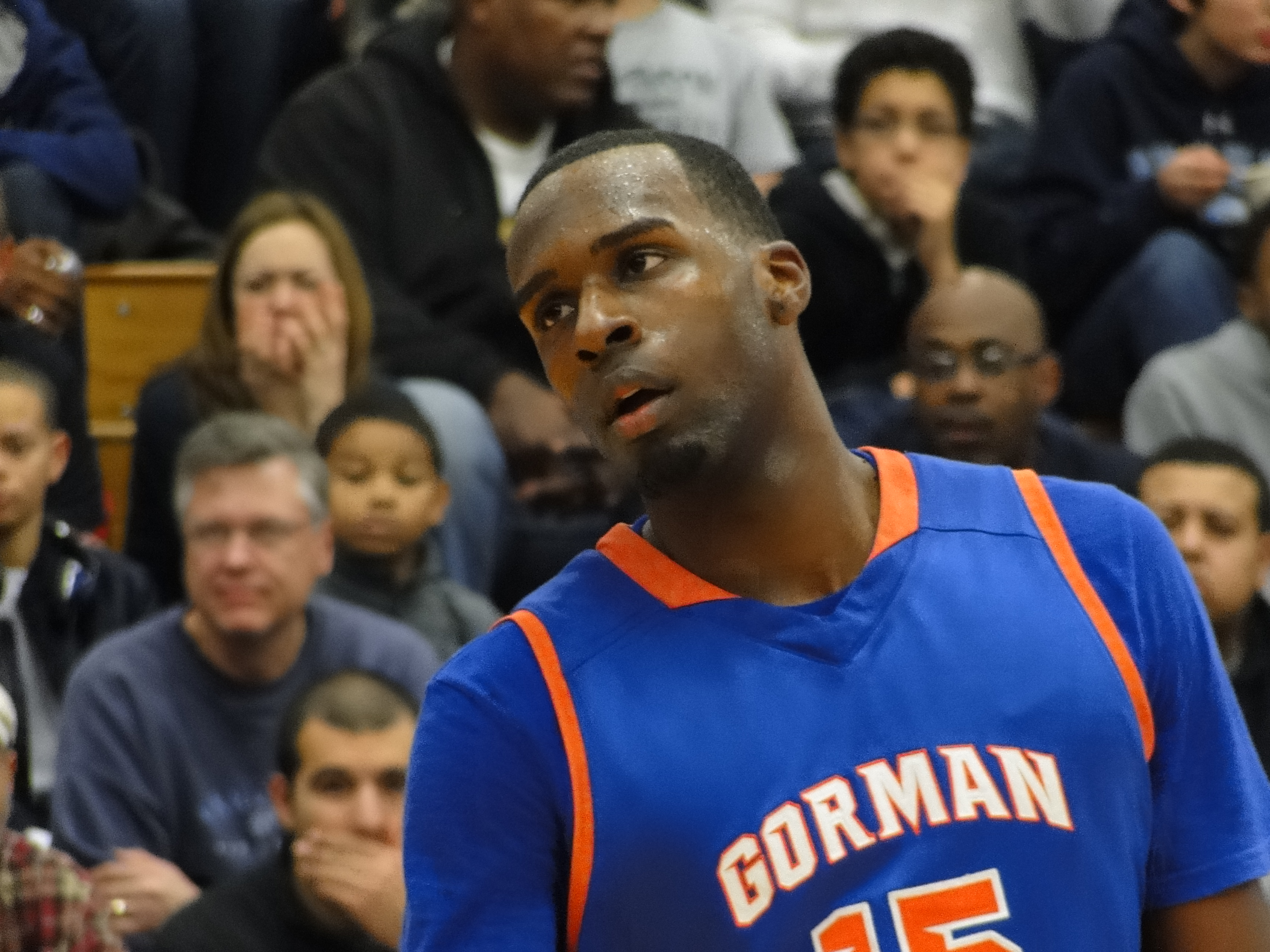
Muhammad with Bishop Gorman High School in 2011.

- Nevada Gatorade Player of the Year (2011)
- Naismith Prep Player of the Year (2012)
- Mr. Basketball USA (2012)
- Morgan Wootten Player of the Year Award winner (2012)
- McDonald's All-American Game MVP (2012)
- McDonald's All-American team selection (2012)
- Jordan Brand Classic High School All-American team selection (2012)
- First-team Parade All-American (2012)
- Nike Hoop Summit (2012)
- Nike Hoop Summit all-time leading scorer (2012)
- Powerade Slam Dunk Contest winner (2012)

=== College ===
- Second-team All-American – TSN (2013)
- First-team All-Pac-12 (2013)
- Freshman All-American (2013)
- Pac-12 co-Freshman of the Year (2013)

=== NBA ===
- Rising Stars Challenge (2015)
