= Apple Valley High School =

Apple Valley High School is the name of two high schools in the United States:

- Apple Valley High School (California)
- Apple Valley High School (Minnesota)
