= Arroyo Valley High School =

Location
- 1881 West Base Line Street; San Bernardino, (San Bernardino County), California 92411; United States; 34.1179068°N 117.32739921°W

Information
- Type: Senior High School
- Motto: "Above All the Rest!"
- Established: September 4, 2001
- School district: San Bernardino City Unified School District
- Principal: Manuel Gonzalez
- Staff: 112.21 (FTE)
- Grades: 9th-12th
- Enrollment: 2,730 (2023-2024)
- Student to teacher ratio: 24.33
- Education system: Semester
- Campus: Urban
- Colors: Gold; Black; White
- Mascot: Hawks
- Nickname: AVHS; Arroyo Valley; AV
- Newspaper: The Hawkeye
- Yearbook: Talon Annual
- Website: https://arroyovalley.sbcusd.com/

Arroyo Valley High School is a public high school established in 2001 inside the San Bernardino City Unified School District, located in the City of San Bernardino, California.

== Academics ==
Arroyo Valley High School is part of the International Baccalaureate Organization including the high school portion of the Middle Years Programme and IB Diploma Programme. The school offers the AVID program, AP Courses, and Standard Core along with different academies that prepare students in the path of their preferred career. These Career Academies include Core Academy, Teaching Academy, Global Leadership Academy, and Digital Media Academy. The school has an Academic Decathlon team. The school in March 2016, was given the Gaston Caperton Opportunity Award which recognized the increasing rate of students that participated in the AP exams and their increasing success in them.

== Demographics ==
White	Latino	Asian	African American	Pacific Islander	American Indian	Two or More Races
2%	85%	1%	10%	1%	0.3%	0.2%

According to U.S. News & World Report, 98% of Arroyo Valley's student body is "of color," with 95% of the student body coming from an economically disadvantaged household, determined by student eligibility for California's Reduced-price meal program.
