= San Bernardino High School =

- San Bernardino, San Bernardino County, California; United States

Information
- Type: Senior High School
- Established: 1891
- School district: San Bernardino City Unified School District
- CEEB code: 052797
- Teaching staff: 70.92 (FTE)
- Enrollment: 1,475 (2023-2024)
- Student to teacher ratio: 20.80
- Nickname: Cardinals
- Website: sanbernardino.sbcusd.com

San Bernardino High School (SBHS) is an American public high school within San Bernardino, California and a member of the San Bernardino City Unified School District. SBHS was granted charter as a city in 1963, under the name Cardinal City.

== History ==
San Bernardino High School was officially established when residents of the San Bernardino, California approved a US$60,000 (equivalent to $2,150,000 in 2025) bond for construction of a high school in 1891. Construction of a three-story building at the southwest corner of Eighth and E Streets was completed in 1892 and received state accreditation in 1893 as San Bernardino Polytechnic High School. In 1915, after enrollment had exceeded 400 students, a new campus was built consisting of five main buildings.

In 1963, California Governor Pat Brown granted the SBHS a city charter under the name Cardinal City.

== Notable alumni ==
- Tom Bass (American football) – American football coach (1935–2019)
- Bryon Russell – American basketball player (b. 1970)
- Paul Shoup – American Businessman. (1874 – 1946)
