= Crossroads Christian Church =

Coordinates: 33°51′56″N 117°34′04″W

- Crossroads Christian Church
- Location: 2331 Kellogg Ave, Corona, CA 92881-3535
- Country: United States
- Denomination: Nondenominational
- Website: crossroadschurch.com

History
- Founded: 1892
- Founder: 9 members

Architecture
- Architect: Visioneering Studios

Crossroads Christian Church is an Nondemominational Christian megachurch, located in Corona, California, United States.

== History ==
Crossroads Christian Church was founded in 1892 by nine members in Corona, California. Led by Reverend Wright and Sister Iola, the church opened as the "First Christian Church of South Riverside." In 1932, the church changed its name to "1st Christian Church, Corona"; at the time, it had 100 members. The current name was put in place in 1980.

In 2005, a 3,000-seat worship center and chapel were opened. To celebrate the opening of the worship center several concerts were presented featuring artists such as Olivia Newton-John, SHeDAISY, Delirious?, Jeremy Camp, Michael W. Smith, Lonestar, Casting Crowns, Phil Vassar and Third Day.

By 2009, Crossroads Christian Church had over 8,000 members.

As of 2023, the church is led by senior pastor Chuck Booher.

== General ==
Crossroads Christian Church is situated on a 38 acres (150,000 m^{2}) campus.

The church has a variety of ministries available to attendees including online audio and video sermons and a separate Spanish language ministry.

=== Restoration Roasters ===
In 2003, Crossroads opened its first full-service café called Third Place Cafe. Third Place Cafe was retired in 2013, and the space has been converted into a coffee shop named "Restoration Roasters." It is run by the Orange County Rescue Mission.

== Beliefs and Practices ==
Crossroads Christian Church believes that the Bible is directly inspired by God. The church also believes in the Trinity, as well as Christ's death on the cross and the resurrection.

The church practices the following:

- Salvation. Each service offers an Altar call, a time and space for people to make a spiritual commitment to Jesus Christ publicly.
- Water baptism. Baptism by immersion symbolizes a person's faith and obedience to God, as well as their union with Christ.
- Communion. The church believes the Bible asks for this act of remembrance and faith.
