= Lutheran High School (La Verne, California) =

Former school in California, United States

Coordinates: 34.11538°N 117.76057°W

Lutheran High School La Verne (also known as Faith Lutheran), was a private, college preparatory Lutheran High School in La Verne, California. Affiliated with the Lutheran Church–Missouri Synod (LCMS) and part of the Freelance League, the school served students from the San Gabriel, Pomona, and Inland valleys. Built on a foundation of faith in Christ, the school provided a college preparatory curriculum to a co-educational student population in grades nine through twelve. The school colors were red, white and blue and the mascot was the Trojans.

One special feature of the program at Lutheran High School was its Naval Junior Reserve Officers' Training Corps program, which enrolled over 20% of the student population annually. It was one of only five NJROTC units in the United States that are available in a private school. Because of the achievements of the NJROTC Unit at Lutheran High School, the U.S. Navy rated LHS as an honor distinguished unit. NJROTC Scholarships were available for college-bound students.

Enrollment at the school started to decline in 2000, and by 2023, the school was facing foreclosure. In 2020, the Pacific Southwest District of the LCMS gave financial support and worked with consultants from NextEd to determine the school's future viability. The results of that study led the school's board to announce the closure of the school after the 2022–23 school year.

== Accreditation ==
Lutheran High School was fully accredited by the Western Association of Schools and Colleges (WASC) through 2019. College-preparatory classes offered were approved by the University of California system.

== Athletics ==
Lutheran High School was a member of CIF and competed as an Independent school. Lutheran High School offered the following athletic teams: Football, girls' volleyball, girls' and boys' basketball, soccer, wrestling, baseball, softball, girls' and boys' track and field, golf, and cheer.

== Notable alumni ==
- Grant Jerrett, NBA basketball player and McDonald's All-Star
- Aaron Claverie, U.S. journalist; The Press-Enterprise, Imperial Valley Press, The Californian, KDCI News (Carlsbad), Palo Alto Daily News
