= Camp Kilpatrick =

Juvenile detention camp in Los Angeles County, California

Camp Kilpatric
- Interactive map of Camp Kilpatric
- Location: Santa Monica Mountains, Los Angeles County, California; 34°5′30.04″N 118°50′7.98″W

Camp Kilpatrick is a juvenile detention camp located in the Santa Monica Mountains of western Los Angeles County, California. A member of the Freelance League, the camp is known for its sports program. Most notable is the camp's American football team, the Kilpatrick Mustangs. The 1993 Emmy Award-winning documentary film Gridiron Gang documents the team's 1990 season, and the 2006 film of the same name is loosely based on those events. The Camp Kilpatrick athletics program was ended in August 2012.
