= Orange County Rescue Mission =

Orange County Rescue Mission, a California Homeless Shelter

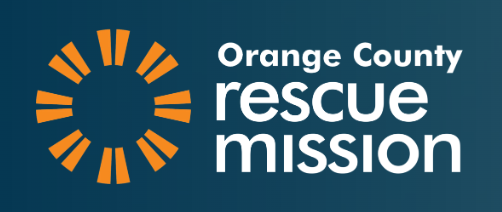
Official Logo

The Orange County Rescue Mission (OCRM) is a faith-based, 501(c)(3) nonprofit focused on reducing homelessness. Headquartered in Tustin, California, OCRM operates multiple programs on nine campuses throughout Orange County to help people move from homelessness to self-sufficiency. OCRM supports homeless men, women, and families with housing, food, clothing, job training, medical care, dental care, tattoo removal, psychological counseling, and spiritual support. Many OCRM programs are tailored for veterans, families, youth, victims of domestic violence, and victims of sex trafficking. OCRM residents are referred to as "students" as they progress through a structured, milestone-based curriculum. All programs and services are free to OCRM students.

During its 60-years of existence, OCRM has assisted thousands of students with 85% remaining self-sufficient (stably housed, employed, and sober) after completing the roughly two-year program.

== History ==
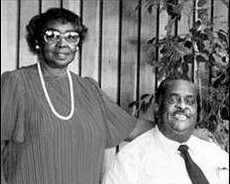
Rev. and Mrs. Whitehead

Lewis Whitehead, a career Marine Corps Technical Sergeant and an ordained Baptist minister, founded OCRM in 1963. Whitehead became interested in homelessness as he encountered individuals living below highway overpasses in Santa Ana, California. He regularly delivered food, blankets, and spiritual support to the homeless throughout the city. In 1963, he opened OCRM's first shelter in the city of Santa Ana. From 1963 through his death in 1990 at the age of 63, Whitehead worked to keep the needs of the homeless in the public eye.

Jim Palmer became the leader of OCRM in 1992 and led the organization for 30 years. During his tenure, the organization experienced substantial growth. It expanded from a single location serving approximately ten individuals and facing significant financial challenges to a multi-site, debt-free organization with private funding sources that served thousands. A key accomplishment under Palmer's leadership was the development of the Village of Hope (VOH) in partnership with the city of Tustin, the Department of Housing and Urban Development (HUD), and HomeAid - Orange County. VOH was built on the site of a decommissioned Marine Corps base and incorporated the apartment style "barracks" that had housed the Marines. Palmer emphasized the importance of creating a welcoming and aesthetically pleasing environment. The VOH was opened in 2008. Palmer continued his leadership of OCRM through 2023 when he retired for health reasons.

Bryan Crain became the OCRM President and CEO in 2023. While serving as a private sector broadcast executive, Crain began volunteering at OCRM delivering meals to homeless people throughout the county. He subsequently left the private sector to become the chief operating officer for OCRM in 2015. He was promoted to the top position upon his predecessor's departure in 2023. Crain maintained the organization's original mission “to minister the love of Jesus Christ to our community through the provision of assistance in the areas of guidance, counseling, education, job training, shelter, food, clothing, health care and independent living communities”. He augmented services such as skills training for construction trades (plumbing, carpentry, electrical), medical and dental care, and legal support. During his tenure, Charity Navigator awarded OCRM the highest rating of four stars.

== Primary facilities ==
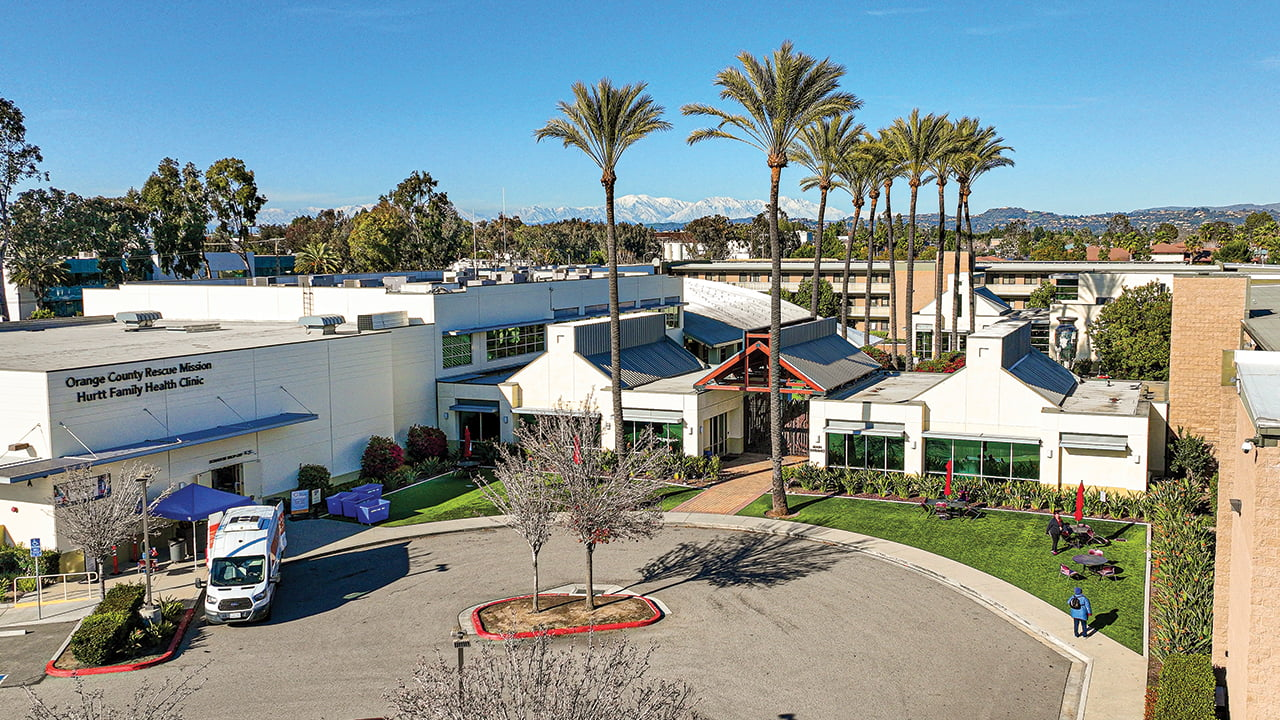
Village of Hope

Village of Hope (VOH) - VOH provides shelter, food, clothing, job training, addiction recovery, and medical services to its 300 residents as they transition from homelessness to self-sufficiency. It also serves as the OCRM headquarters.

Double R Ranch - The Double R Ranch is the newest OCRM facility. Students work with horses and livestock at the 33-acre facility that will house up to 140 students.

House of Hope - House of Hope houses women and their children during the second phase on their path to self-sufficiency.

Hope Family Housing - Hope Family Housing communities provide accommodations for the students as they transition out of the OCRM program and into self-sufficiency.

Hope Harbor - Hope Harbor offers housing and support for homeless teens.

Hurtt Family Health Clinic - The Hurtt clinic is an OCRM sister organization with multiple campuses providing health care to OCRM students and other members of the community.

Parent & Child Enrichment Center (PCE) - Located on the VOH campus, PCE provides care and education for newborns, toddlers, and preschool-age children. PCE also provides parental training classes.

Success Center - The Success Center is the hub of adult education, life skills training, job skills training, and ongoing employment services for all adult students.

Trinity Family Law Clinic -Trinity Family Law Clinic, on the campus of VOH, provides legal support for students with legal issues.

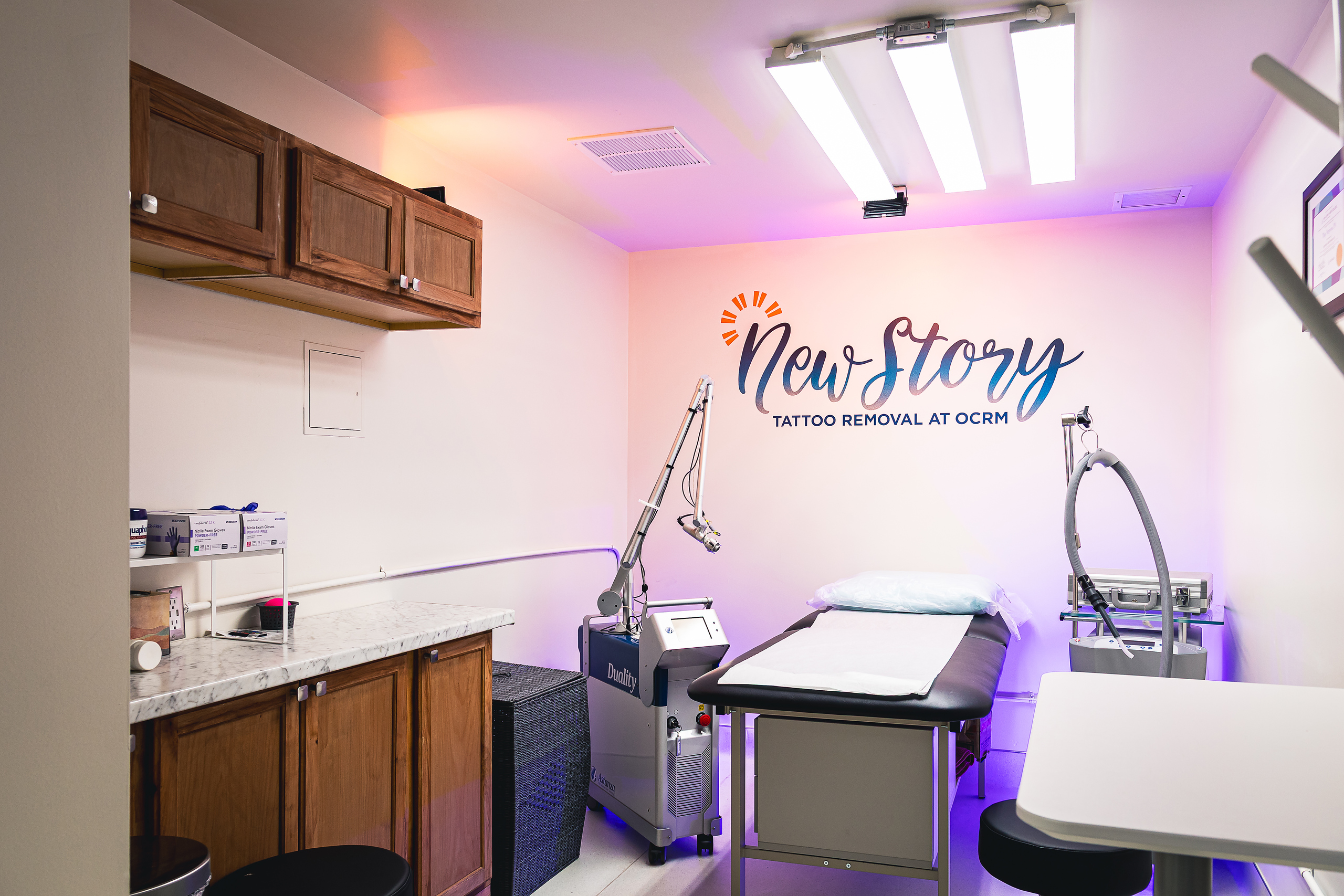
New Story Clinic

New Story Tattoo Removal - The New Story Clinic, on the campus of VOH, provides free tattoo removal for students who choose to have some or all of their tattoos removed.

Veterans Outpost - The Tustin Veterans Outpost houses up to 70 formerly homeless veterans.

Chili Van Mobile Food Ministry - The Chili Van serves warm food to people who are homeless throughout the county.

For Every Woman Mobile Medical Clinic - For Every Woman provides mobile healthcare for women.
