= List of United States county and city insignia =

The following page displays the official seals, logos, wordmarks, and coats of arms of the cities and counties of the United States.

== Alaska ==
=== Boroughs ===
Seal of Fairbanks North Star Borough

=== Cities and towns ===
Seal of the Municipality of Anchorage

Seal of Juneau

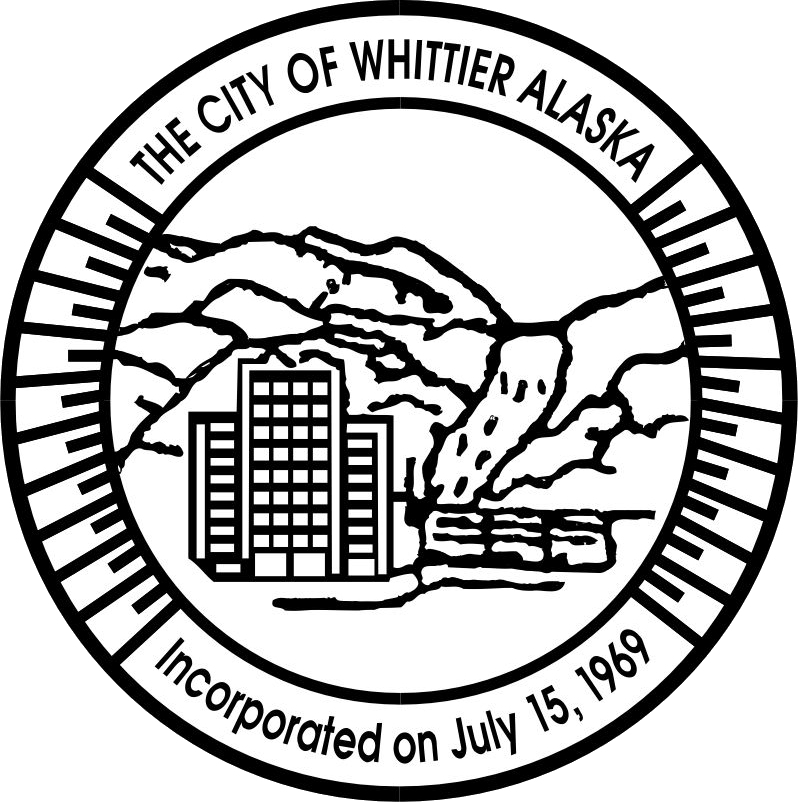
Seal of Whittier

== Arizona ==
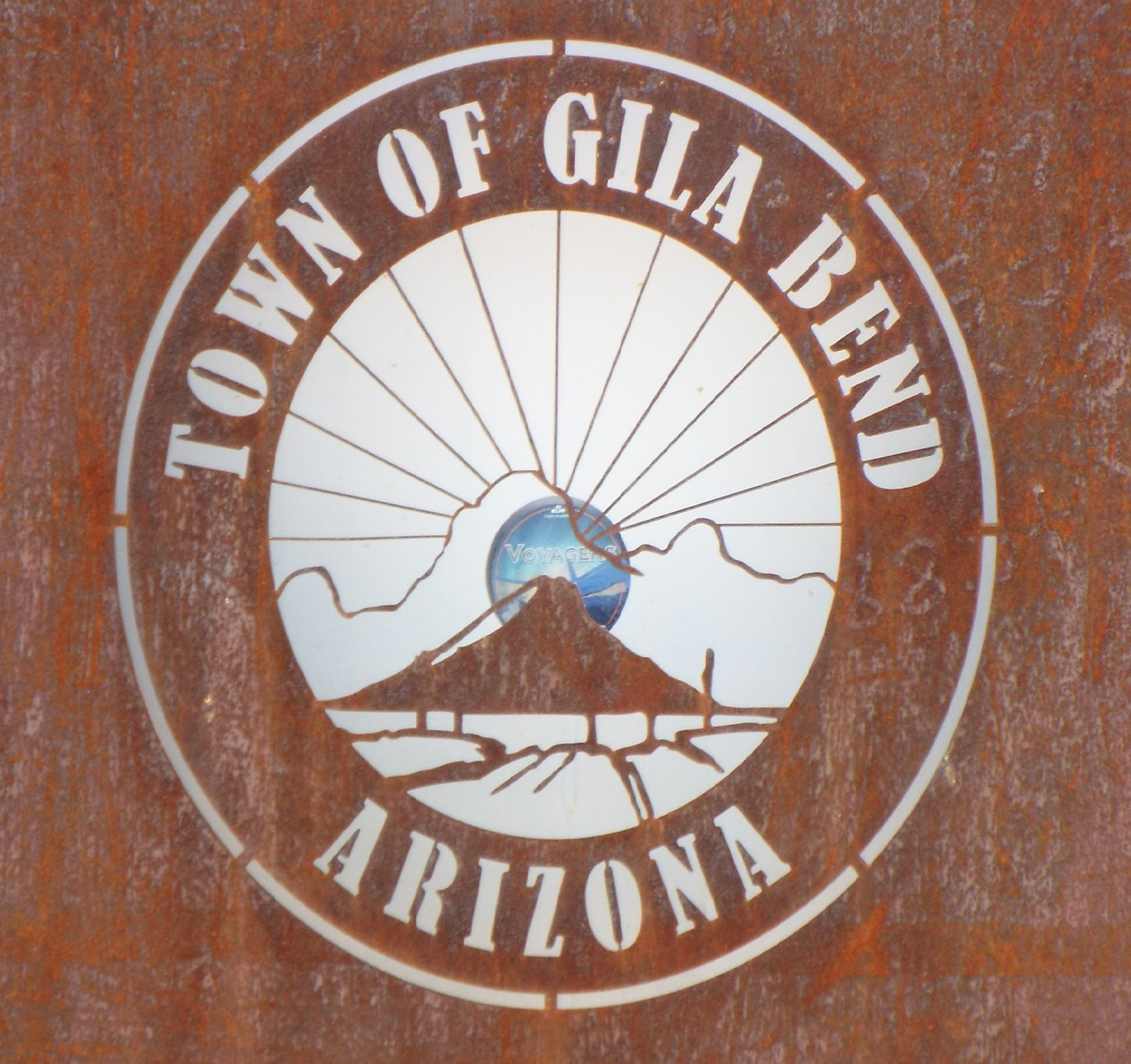
Seal of the Town of Gila Bend

Seal of the Town of Gilbert

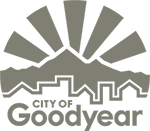
Seal of the City of Goodyear

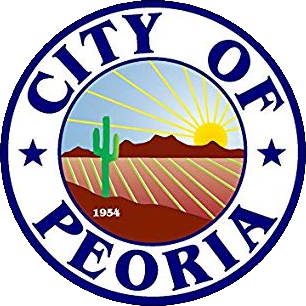
Seal of the City of Peoria

== California ==
=== Counties ===
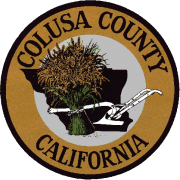
Seal of Colusa County

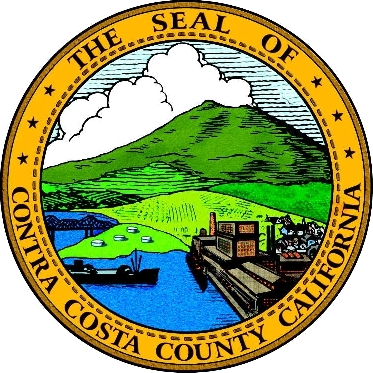
Seal of Contra Costa County

Seal of the County of Fresno

Seal of the County of Glenn

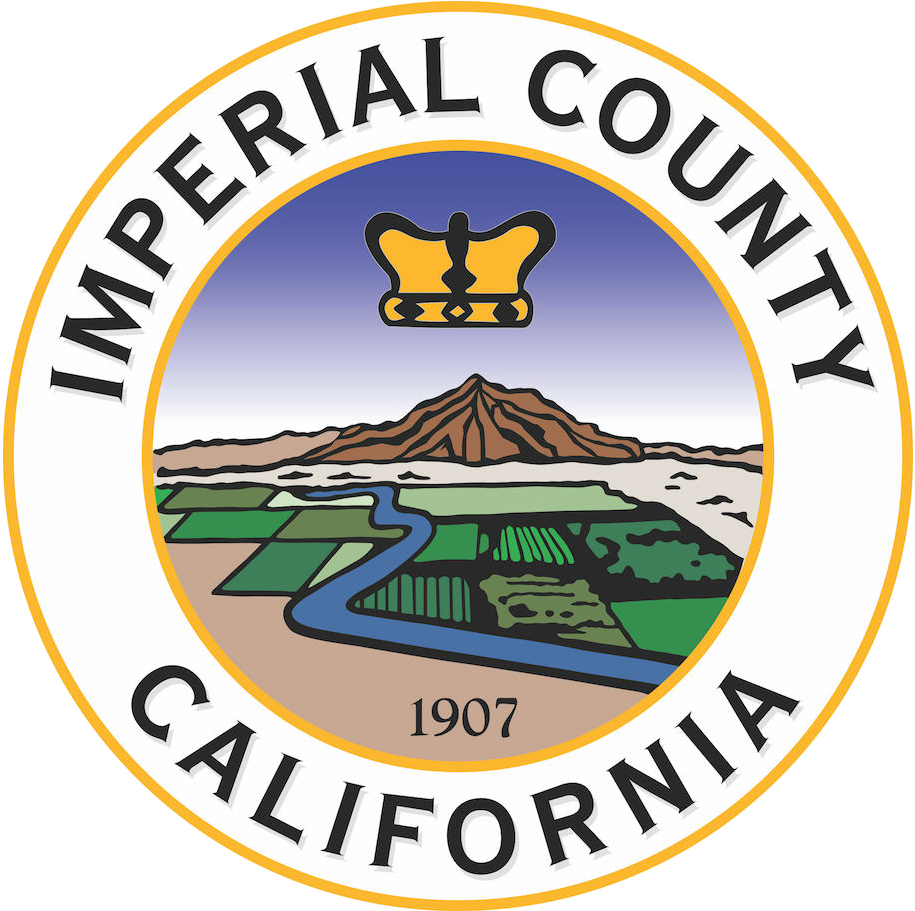
Seal of Imperial County

Seal of the County of Kern

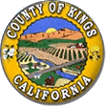
Seal of the County of Kings

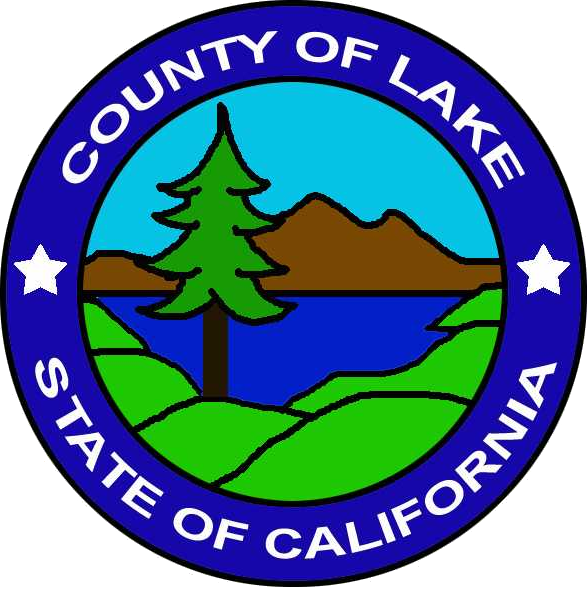
Seal of the County of Lake

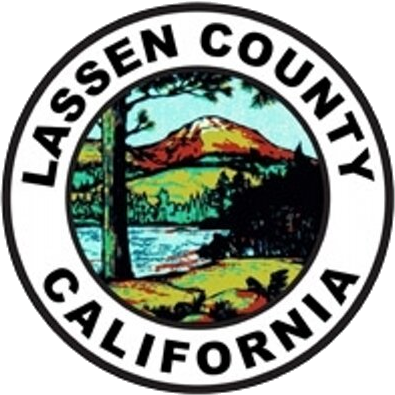
Seal of Lassen County

Seal of the County of Los Angeles

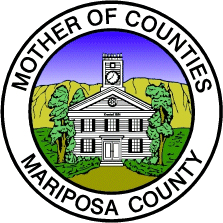
Seal of Mariposa County

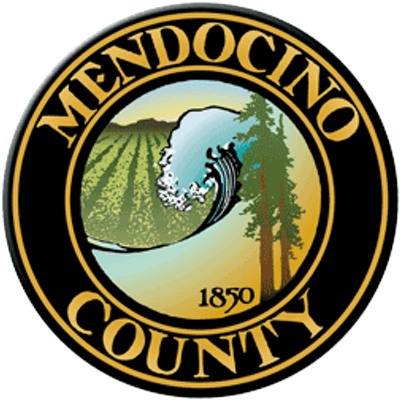
Seal of Mendocino County

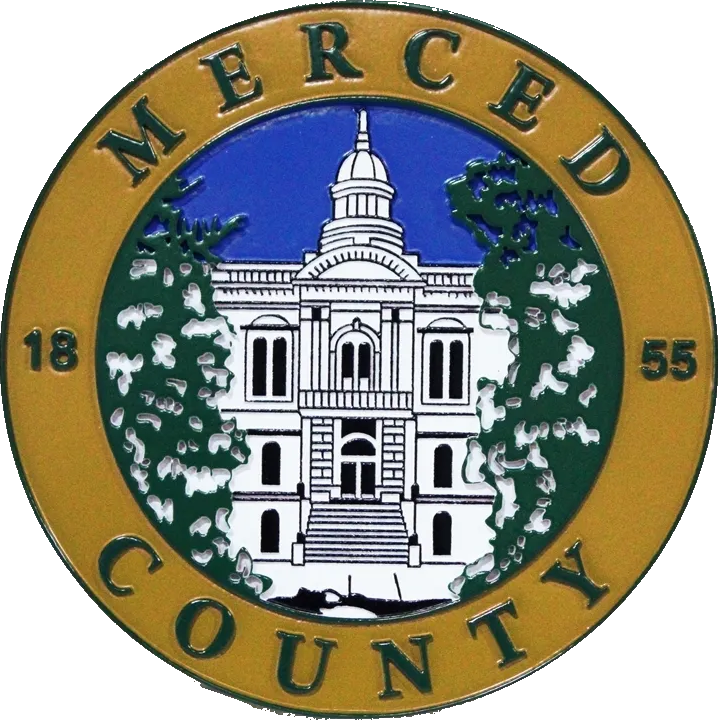
Seal of Merced County

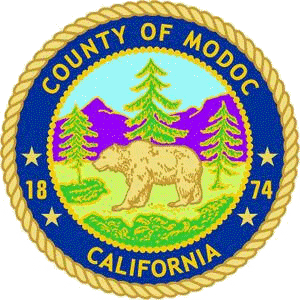
Seal of the County of Modoc

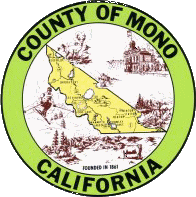
Seal of the County of Mono

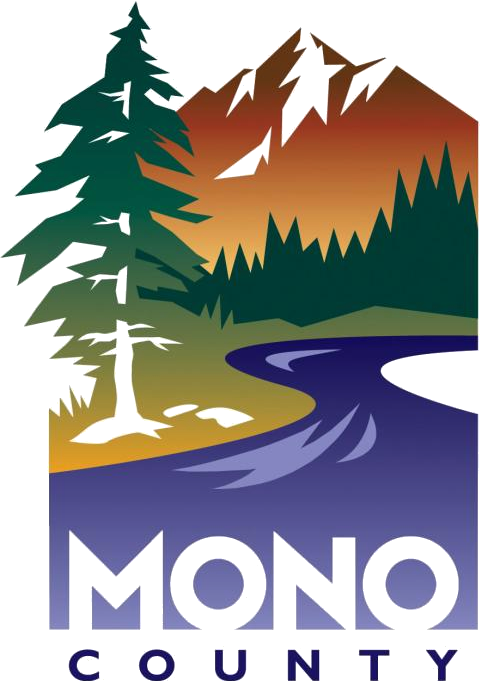
Logo of Mono County

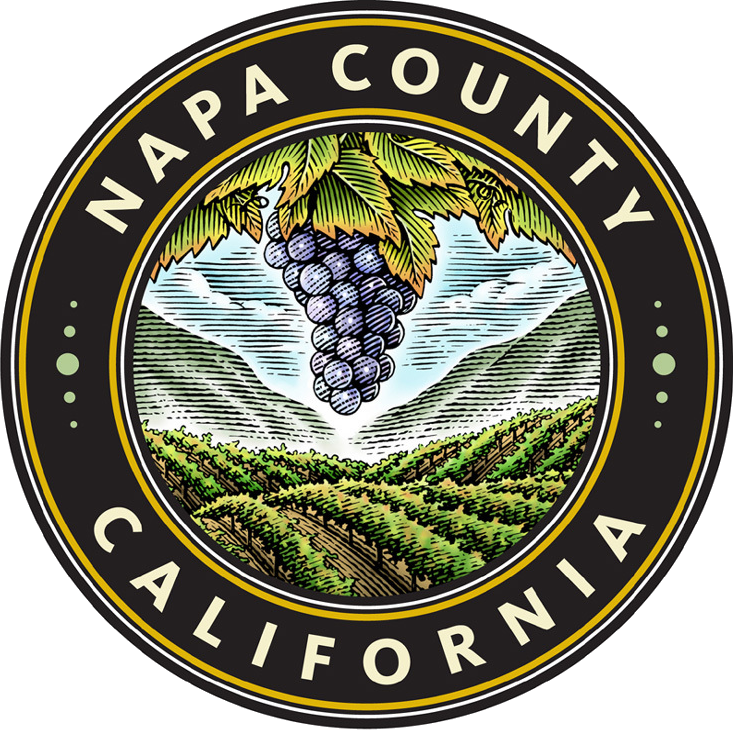
Seal of the County of Napa

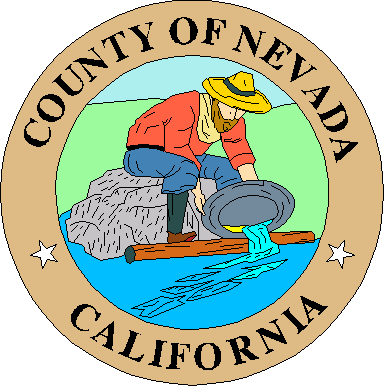
Seal of the County of Nevada

Seal of the County of Orange

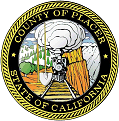
Seal of the County of Placer

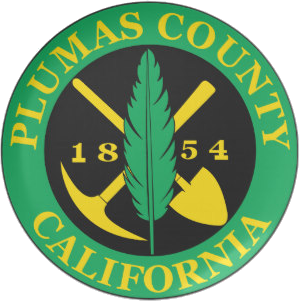
Seal of the County of Plumas

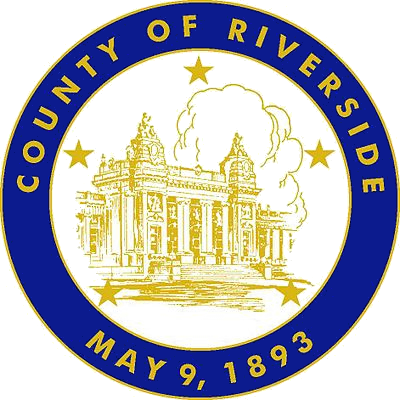
Seal of the County of Riverside

Seal of the County of Sacramento

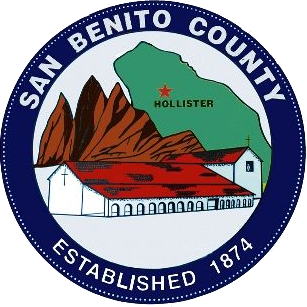
Seal of San Benito County

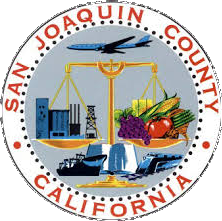
Seal of San Joaquin County

Seal of San Luis Obispo County

Seal of the County of San Mateo

Seal of the County of San Bernardino

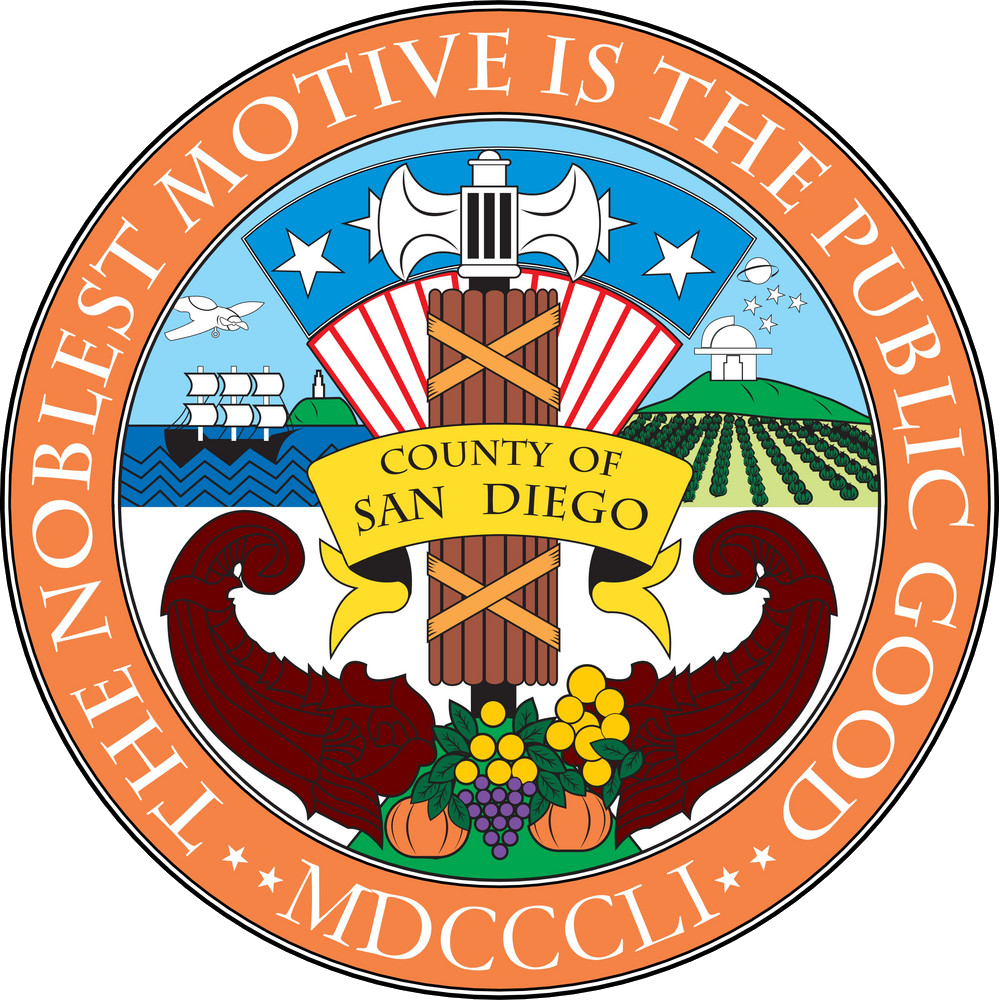
Seal of the County of San Diego

Seal of the City and County of San Francisco

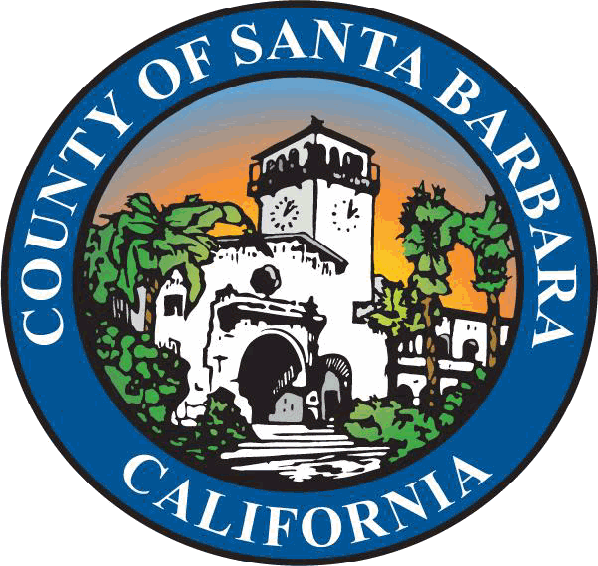
Seal of the County of Santa Barbara

Seal of the County of Santa Clara

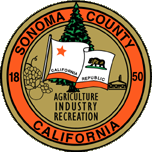
Seal of Sonoma County

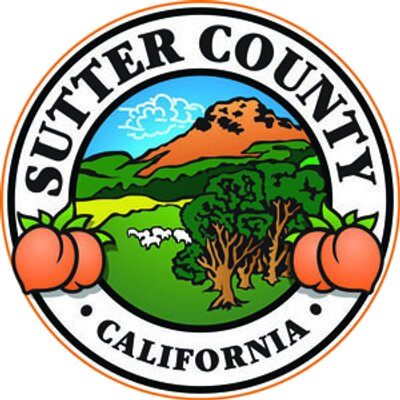
Seal of Sutter County

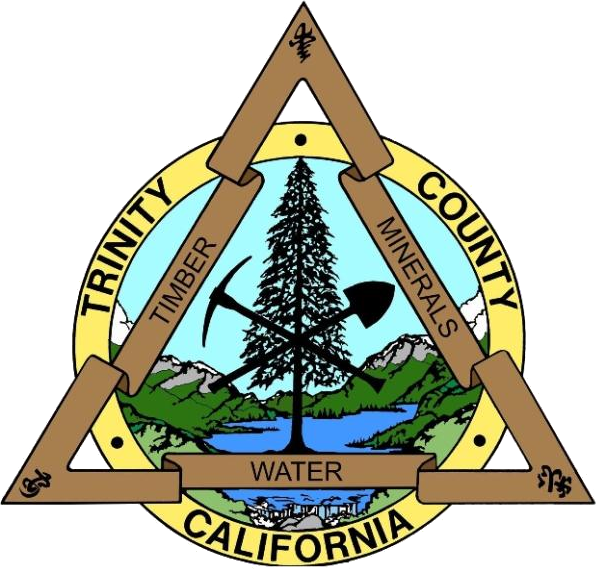
Seal of the County of Trinity

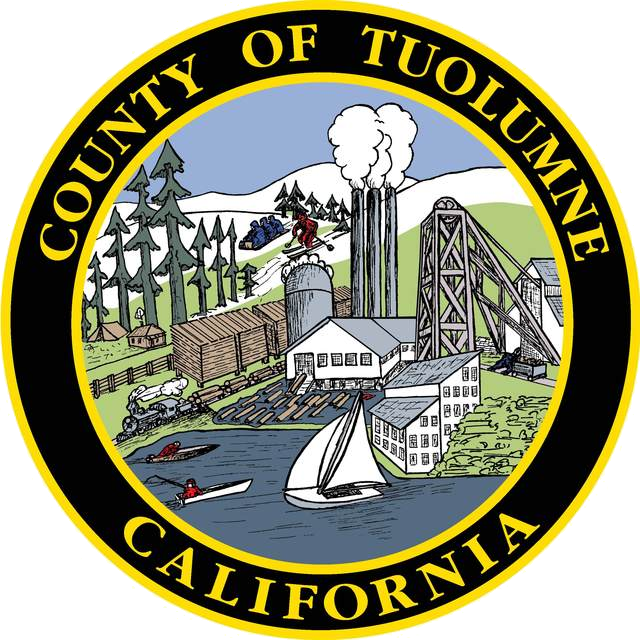
Seal of the County of Tuolumne

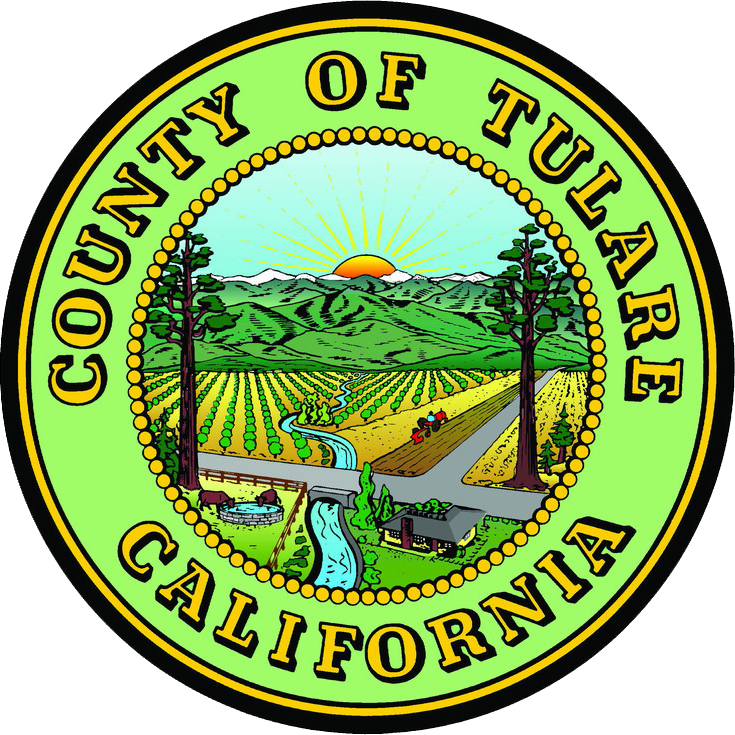
Seal of the County of Tulare

Seal of the County of Ventura

=== Cities and towns ===
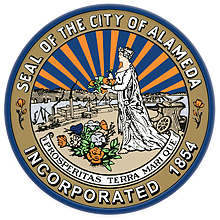
Seal of the City of Alameda

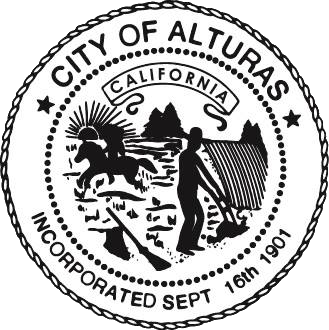
Seal of the City of Alturas

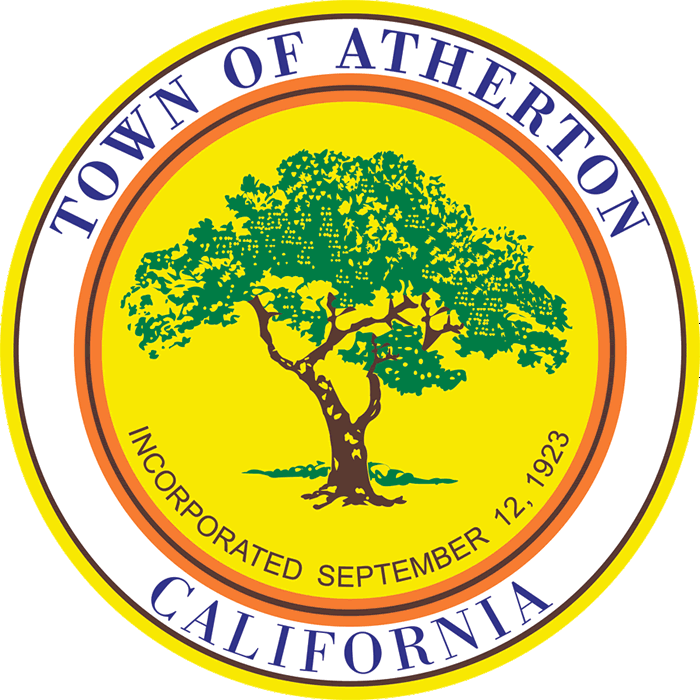
Seal of the Town of Atherton

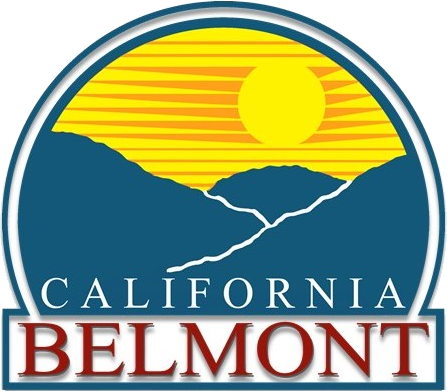
Seal of the City of Belmont

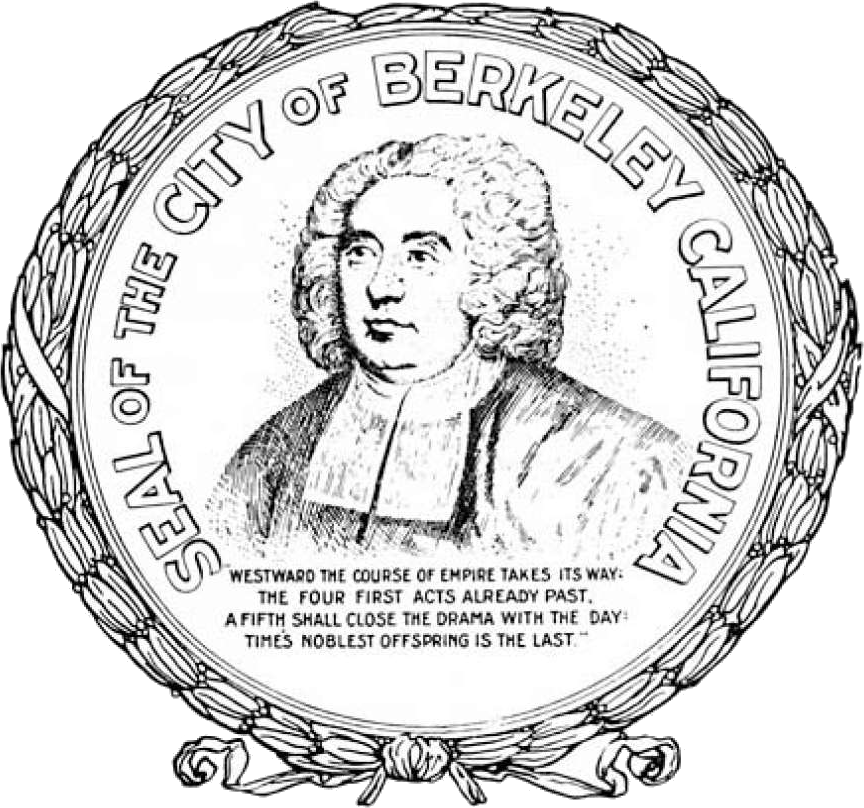
Seal of the City of Berkeley

Seal of the City of Beverly Hills

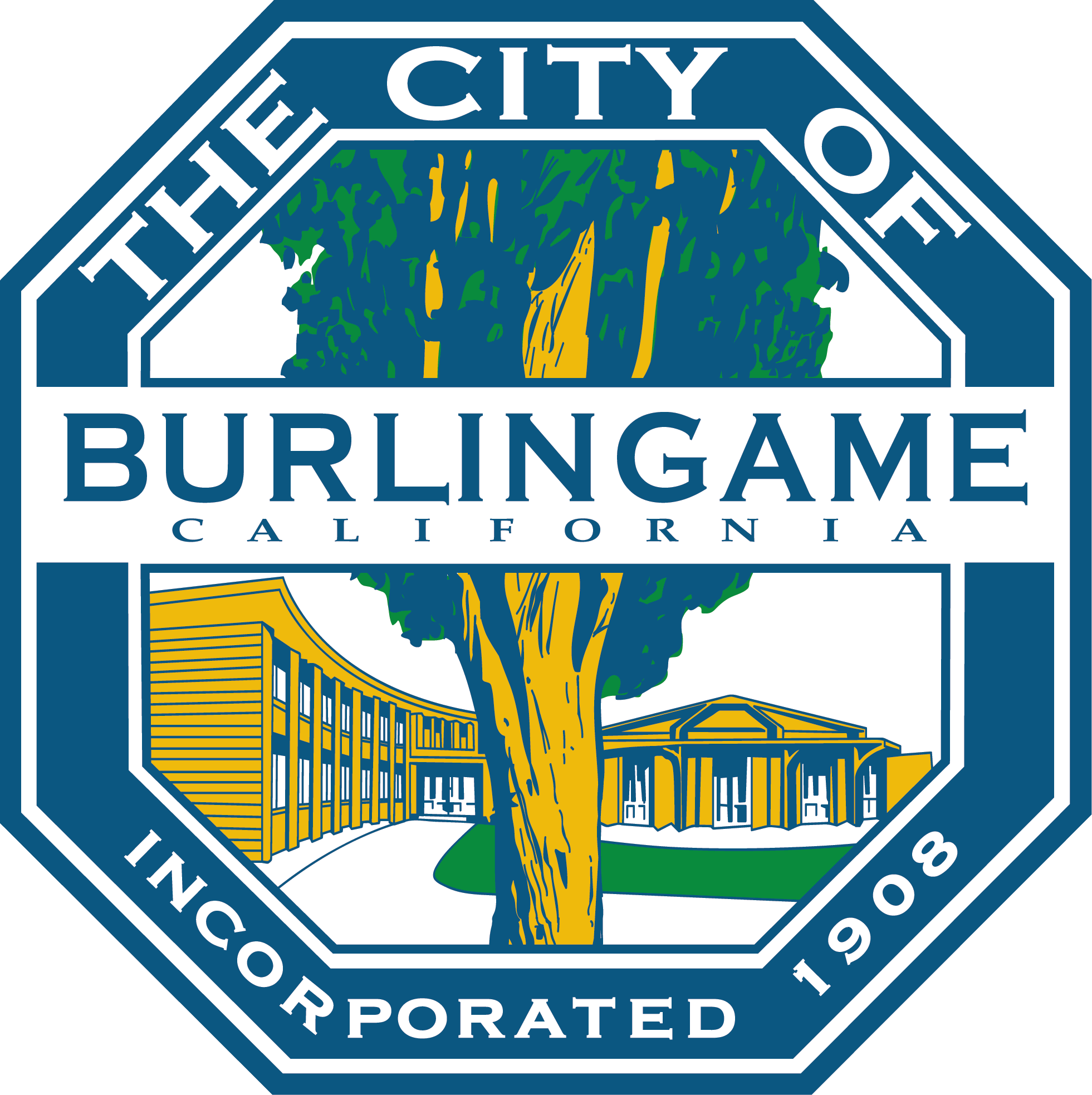
Seal of the City of Burlingame

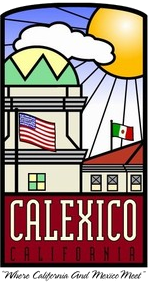
Seal of the City of Calexico

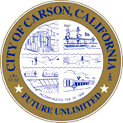
Seal of the City of Carson

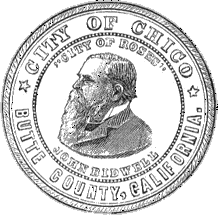
Seal of the City of Chico

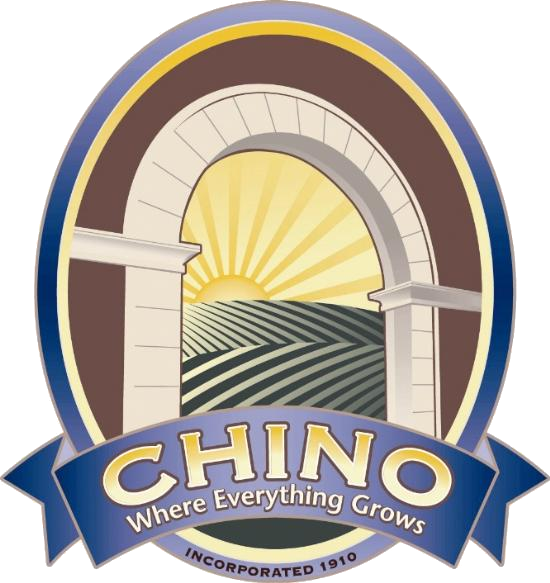
Logo of the City of Chino

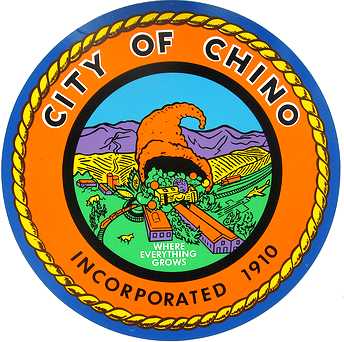
Seal of the City of Chino

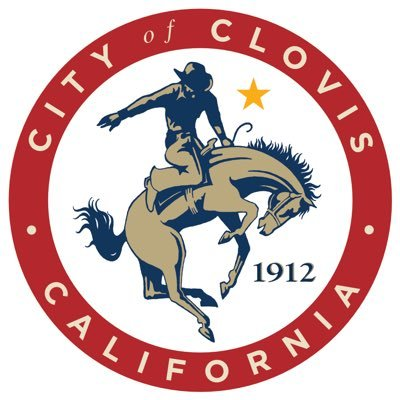
Seal of the City of Clovis

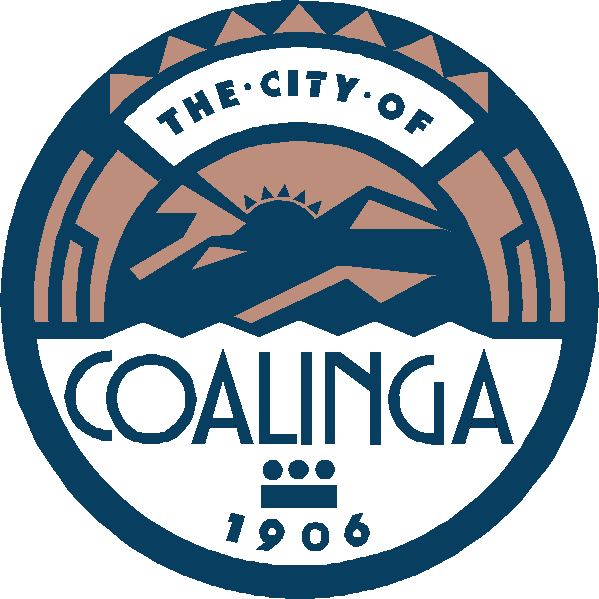
Seal of the City of Coalinga

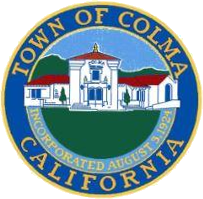
Seal of the Town of Colma

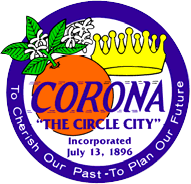
Seal of the City of Corona

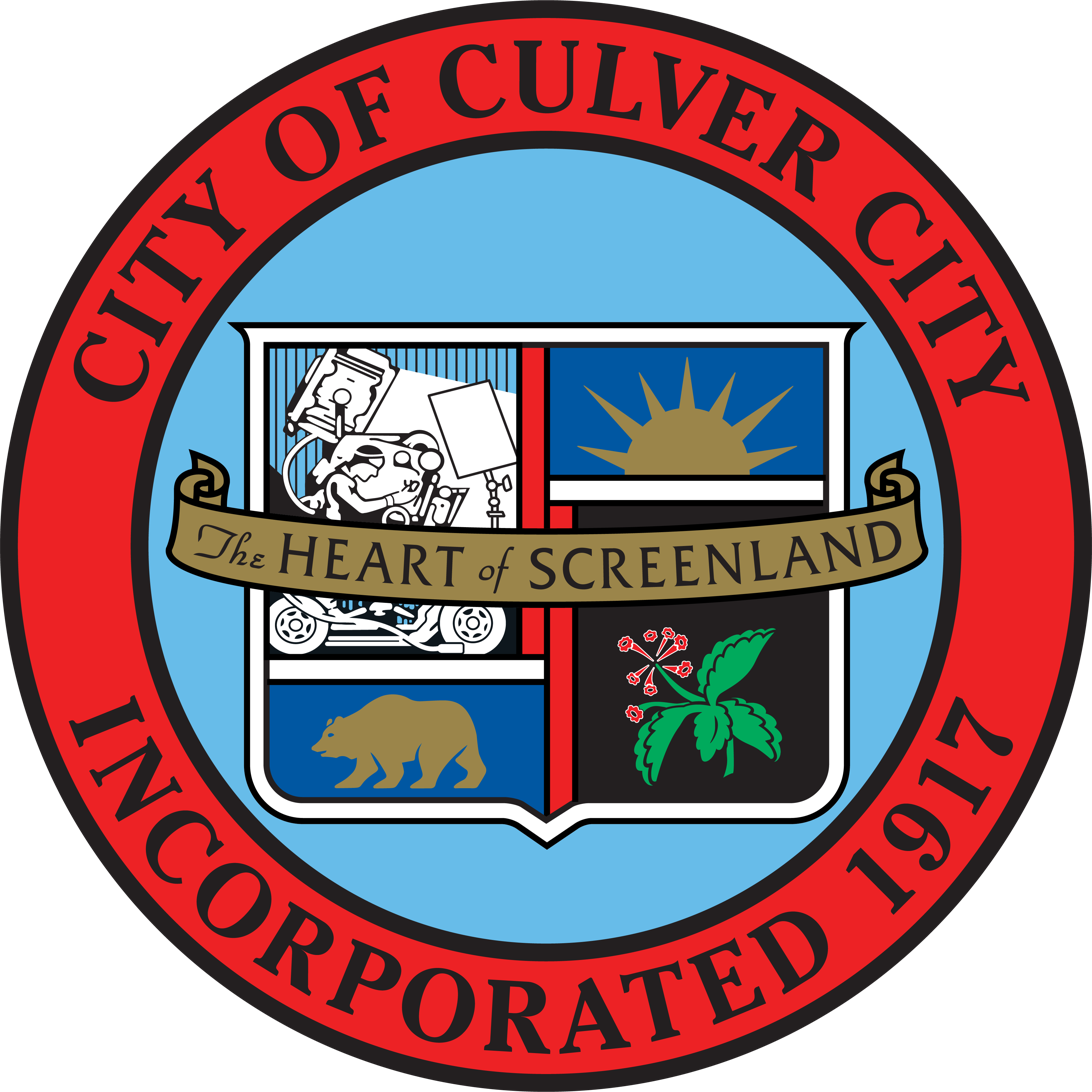
Seal of the City of Culver City

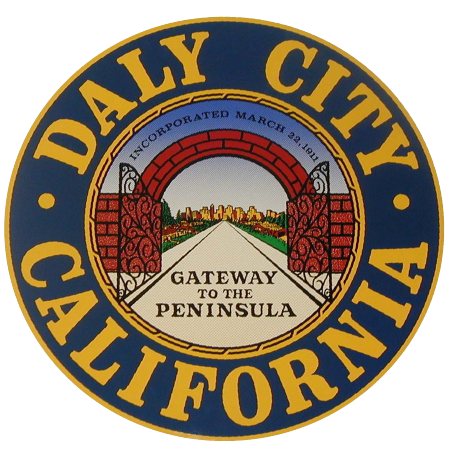
Seal of the City of Daly City

Seal of the City of Downey

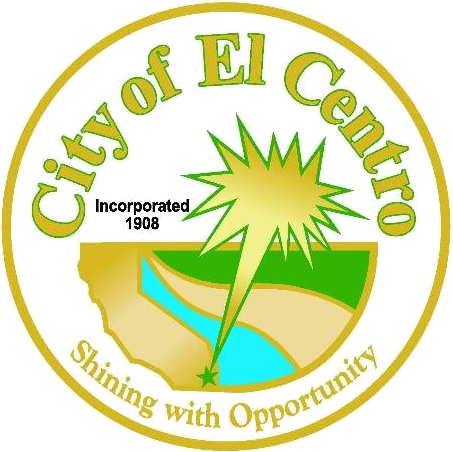
Seal of the City of El Centro

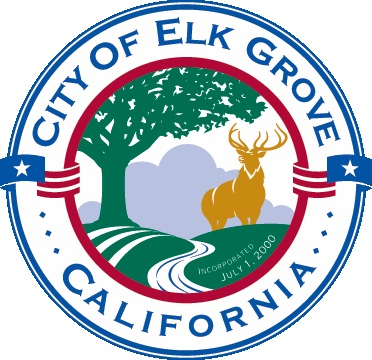
Seal of the City of Elk Grove

Logo of the City of Elk Grove

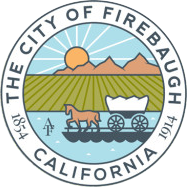
Seal of the City of Firebaugh

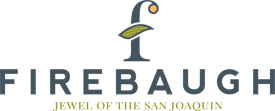
Wordmark of the City of Firebaugh

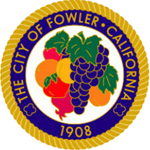
Seal of the City of Fowler

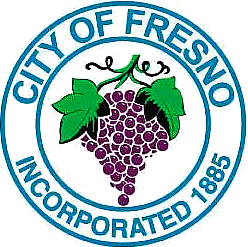
Seal of the City of Fresno

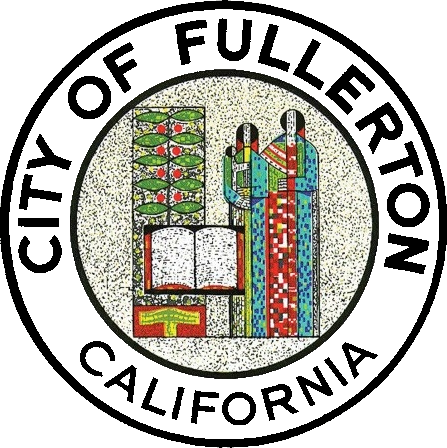
Seal of the City of Fullerton

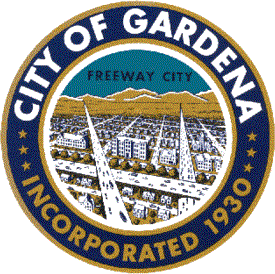
Seal of the City of Gardena

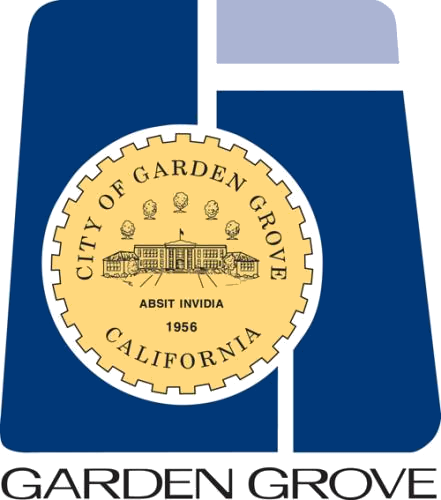
Coat of arms of the City of Garden Grove

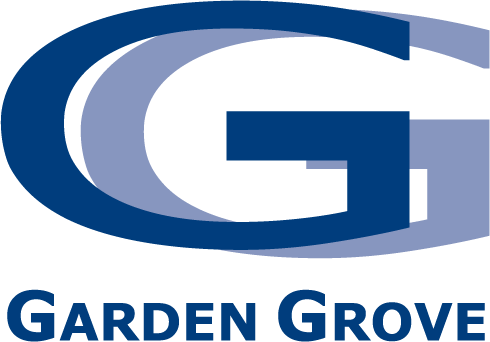
Logo of the City of Garden Grove

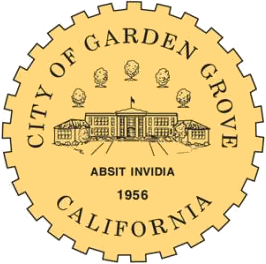
Seal of the City of Garden Grove

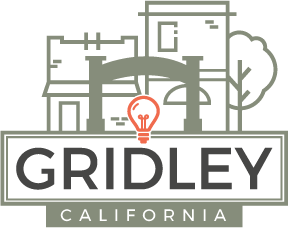
Seal of the City of Gridley

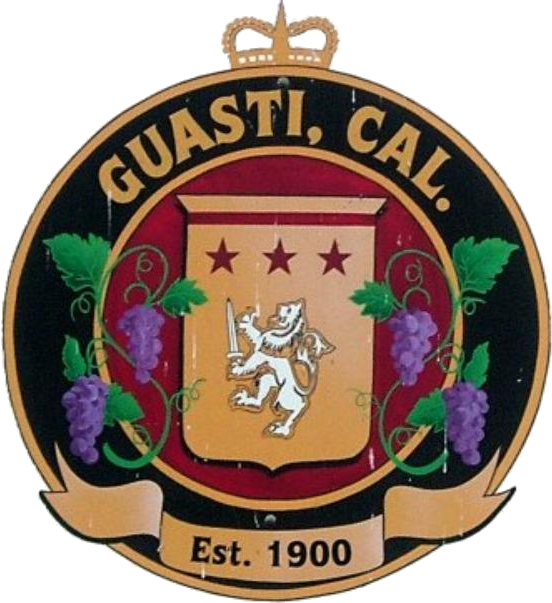
Seal of Guasti

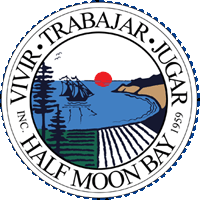
Seal of the City of Half Moon Bay

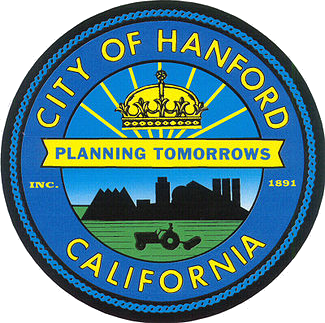
Seal of the City of Hanford

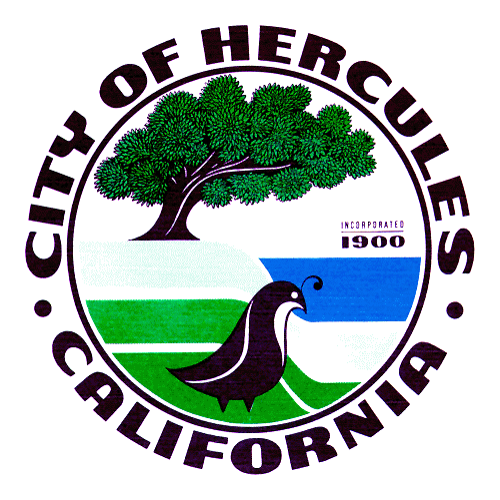
Seal of the City of Hercules

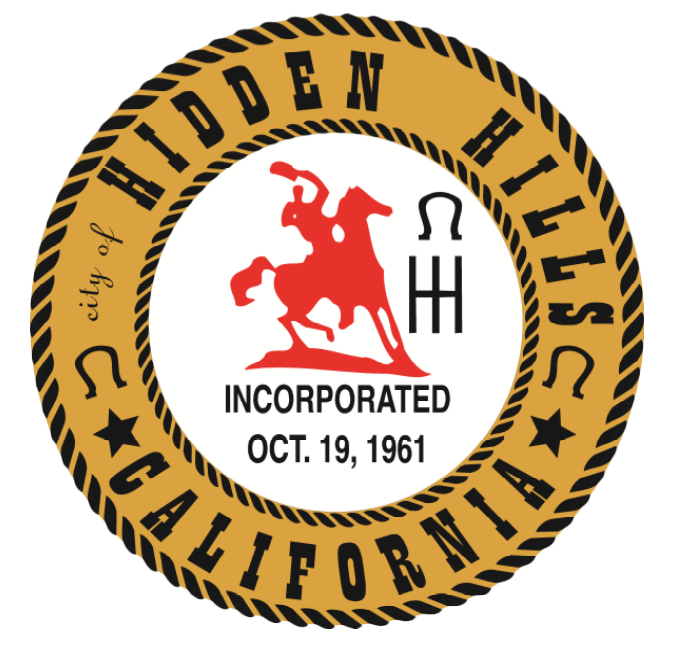
Seal of the City of Hidden Hills

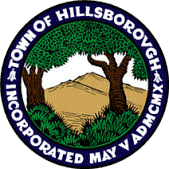
Seal of the Town of Hillsborough

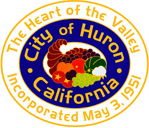
Seal of the City of Huron

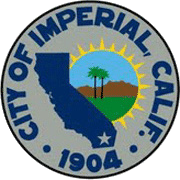
Seal of City of Imperial

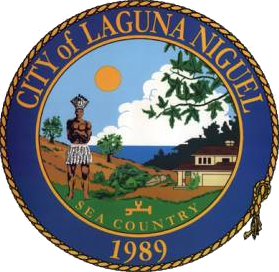
Seal of the City of Laguna Niguel

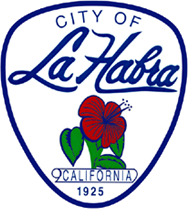
Seal of the City of La Habra

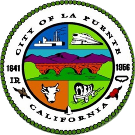
Seal of the City of La Puente

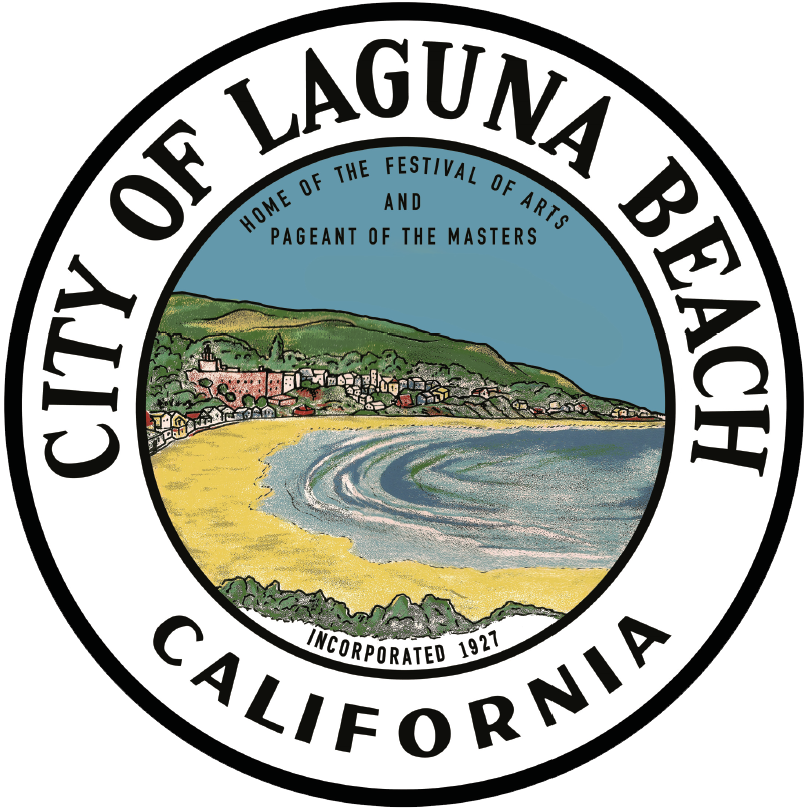
Seal of the City of Laguna Beach

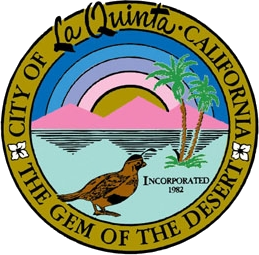
Seal of the City of La Quinta

Seal of the City of Los Angeles

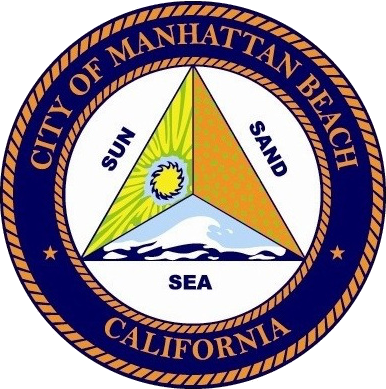
Seal of the City of Manhattan Beach

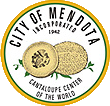
Seal of the City of Mendota

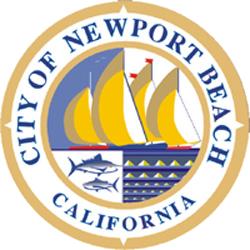
Seal of the City of Newport Beach

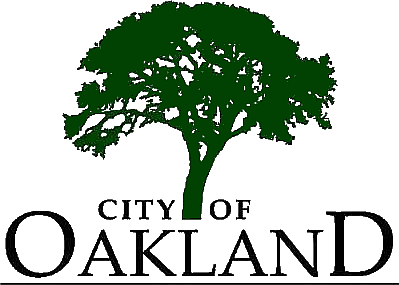
Logo of the City of Oakland

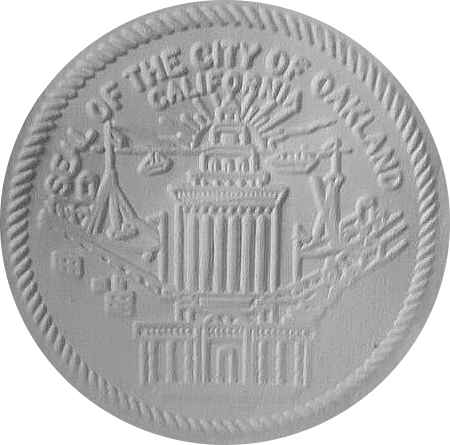
Seal of the City of Oakland

Wordmark of the City of Oakland

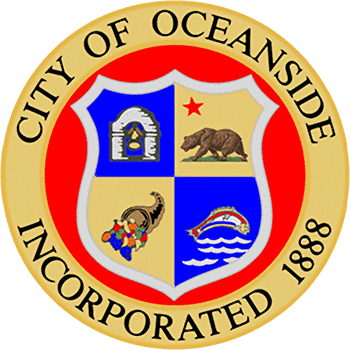
Seal of the City of Oceanside

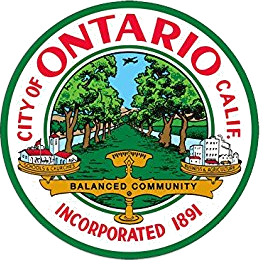
Seal of City of Ontario

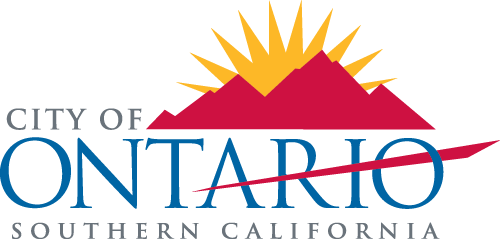
Wordmark of the City of Ontario

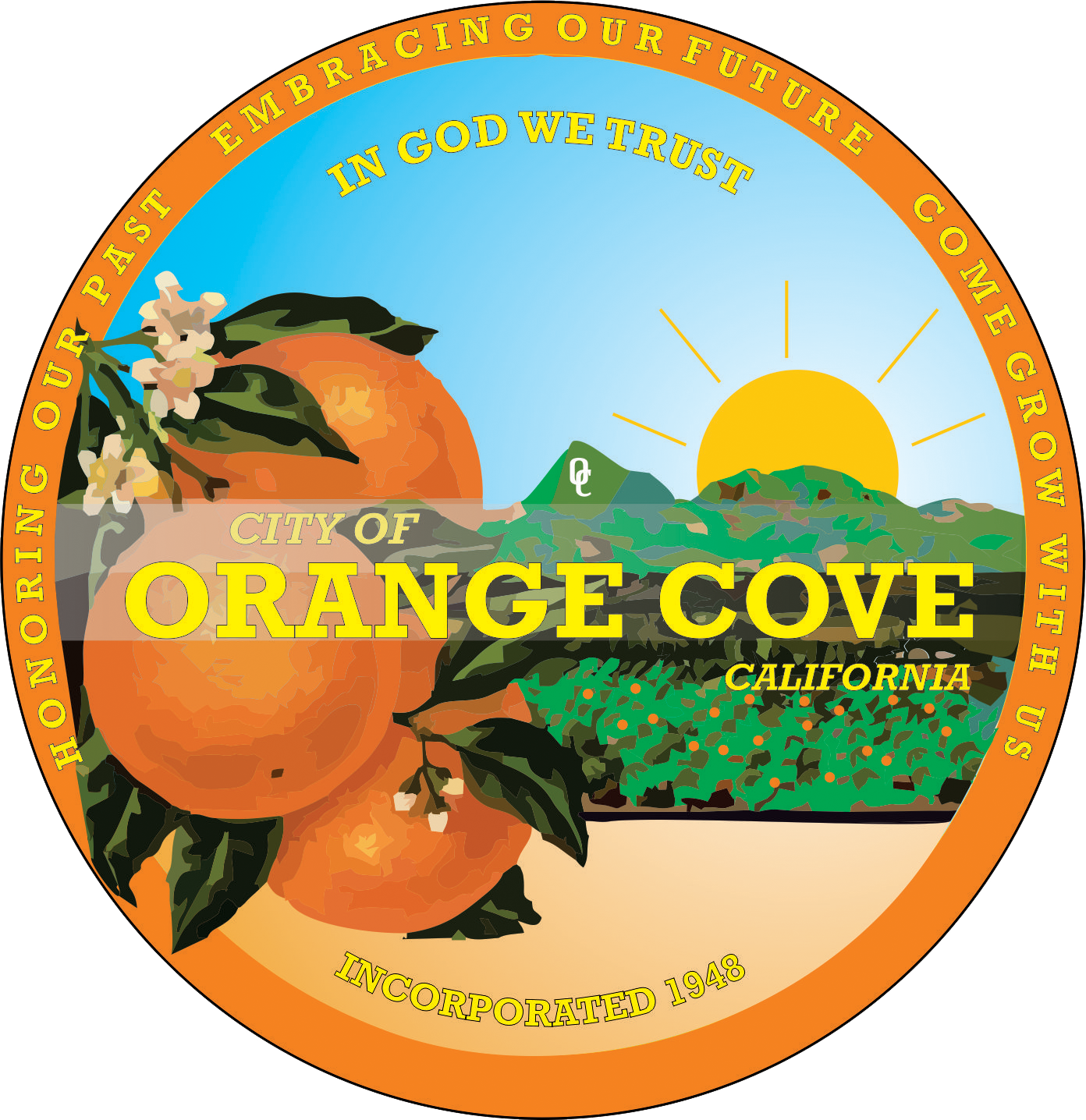
Seal of the City of Orange Cove

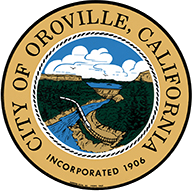
Seal of the City of Oroville

Seal of the City of Palo Alto

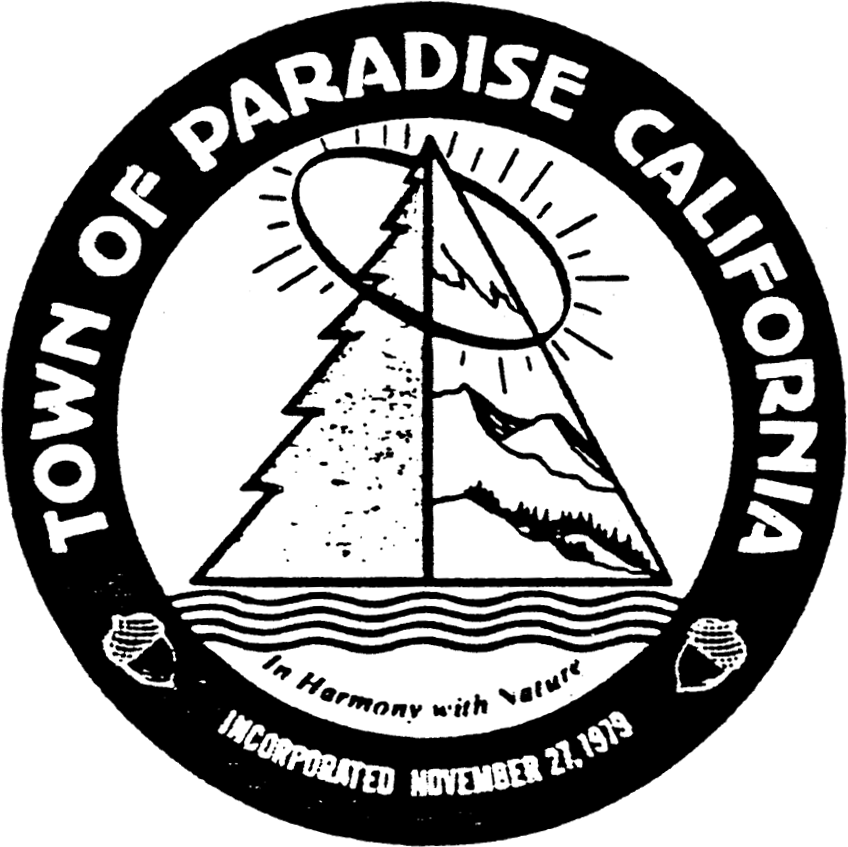
Seal of the City of Paradise

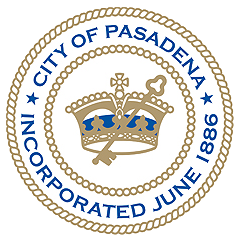
Seal of the City of Pasadena

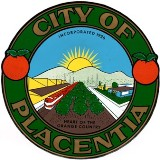
Seal of the City of Placentia

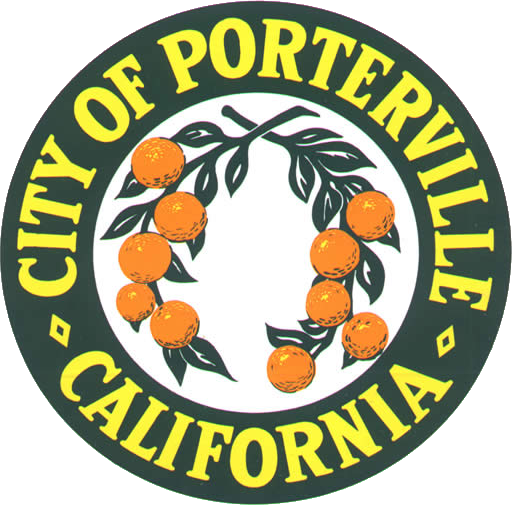
Seal of the City of Porterville

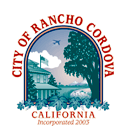
Seal of City of Rancho Cordova

Seal of the City of Rancho Cucamonga

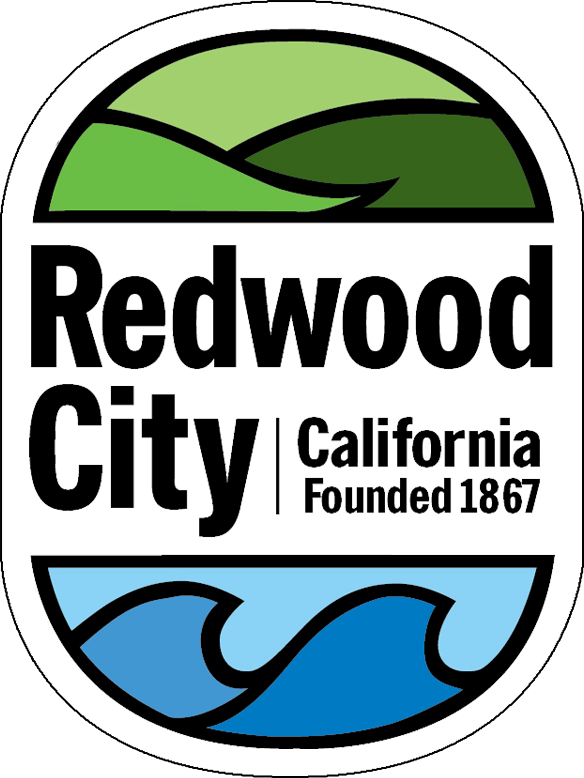
Wordmark of the City of Redwood City

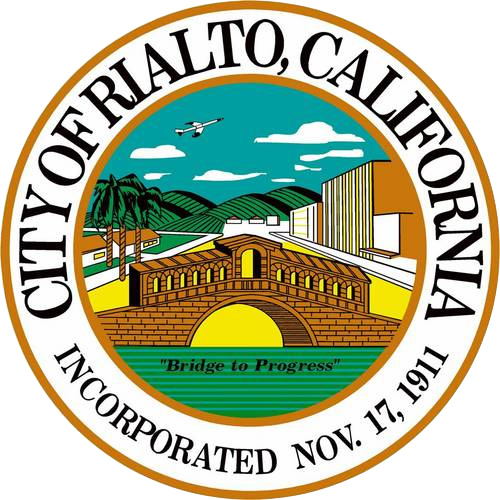
Seal of the City of Rialto

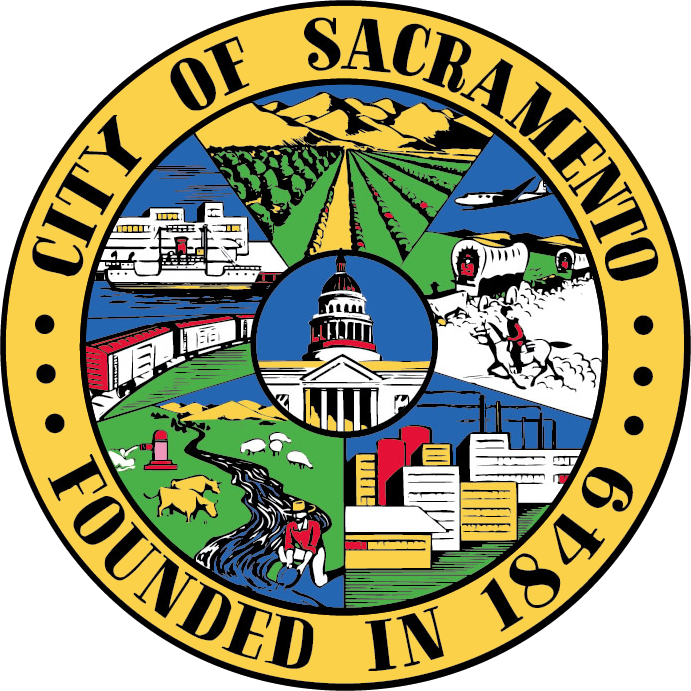
Seal of the City of Sacramento

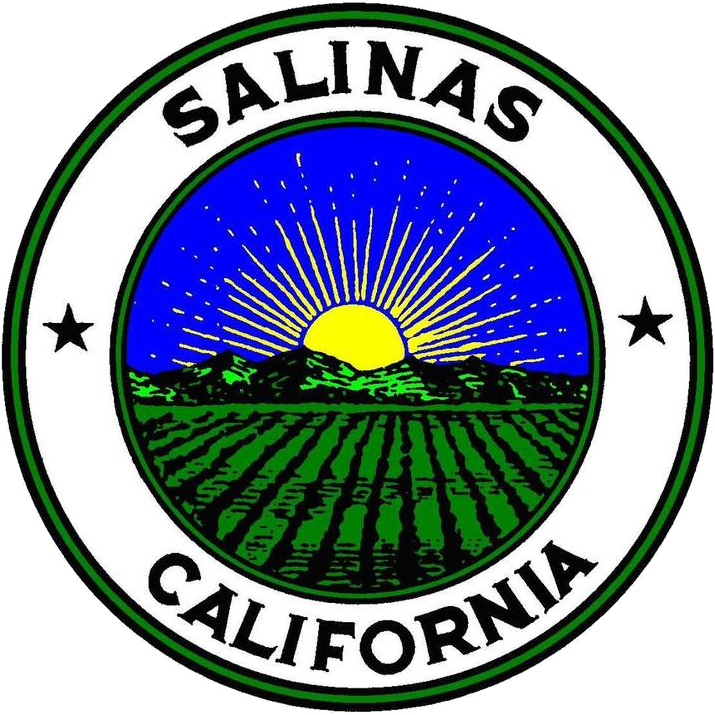
Seal of the City of Salinas

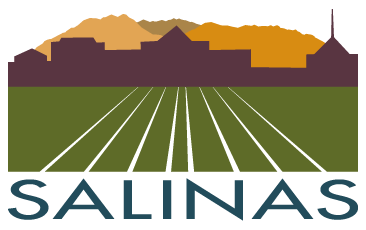
Wordmark of the City of Salinas

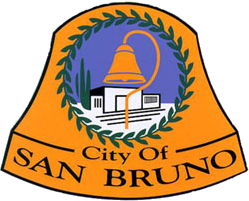
Seal of the City of San Bruno

Seal of the City of San Diego

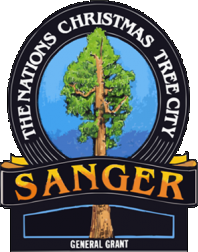
Seal of the City of Sanger

Seal of the City of San Jose

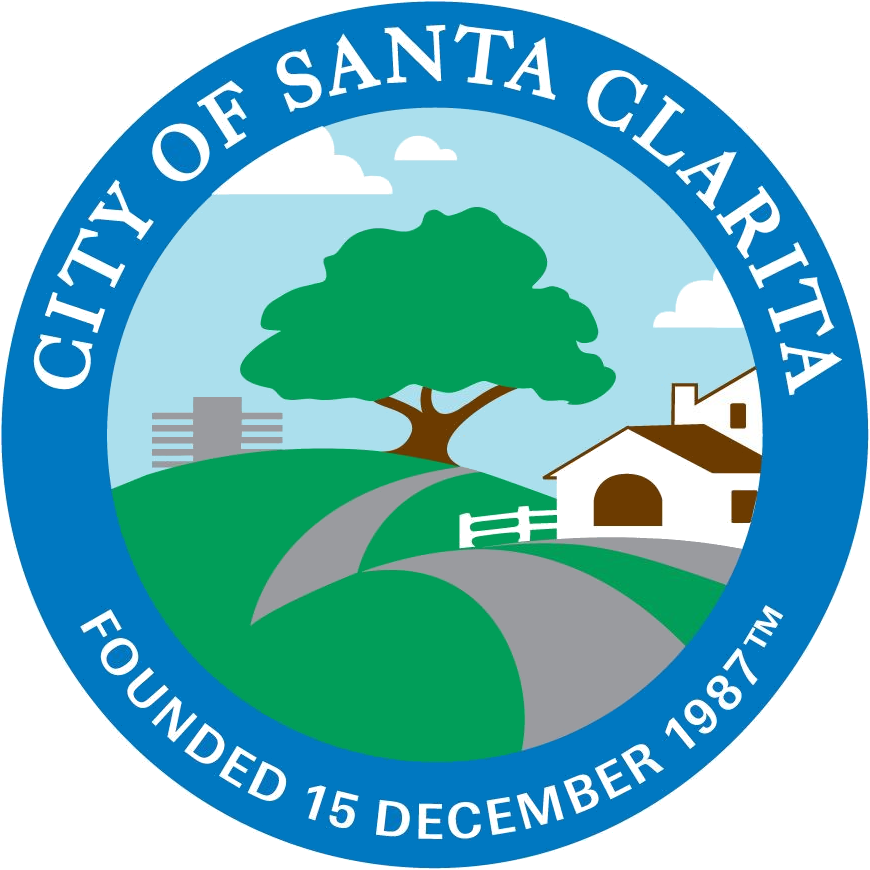
Seal of the City of Santa Clarita

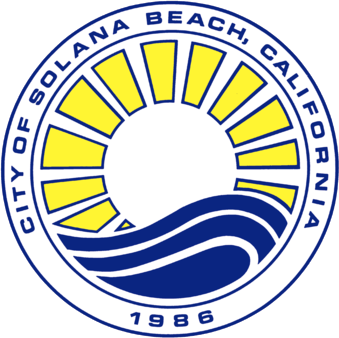
Seal of the City of Solana Beach

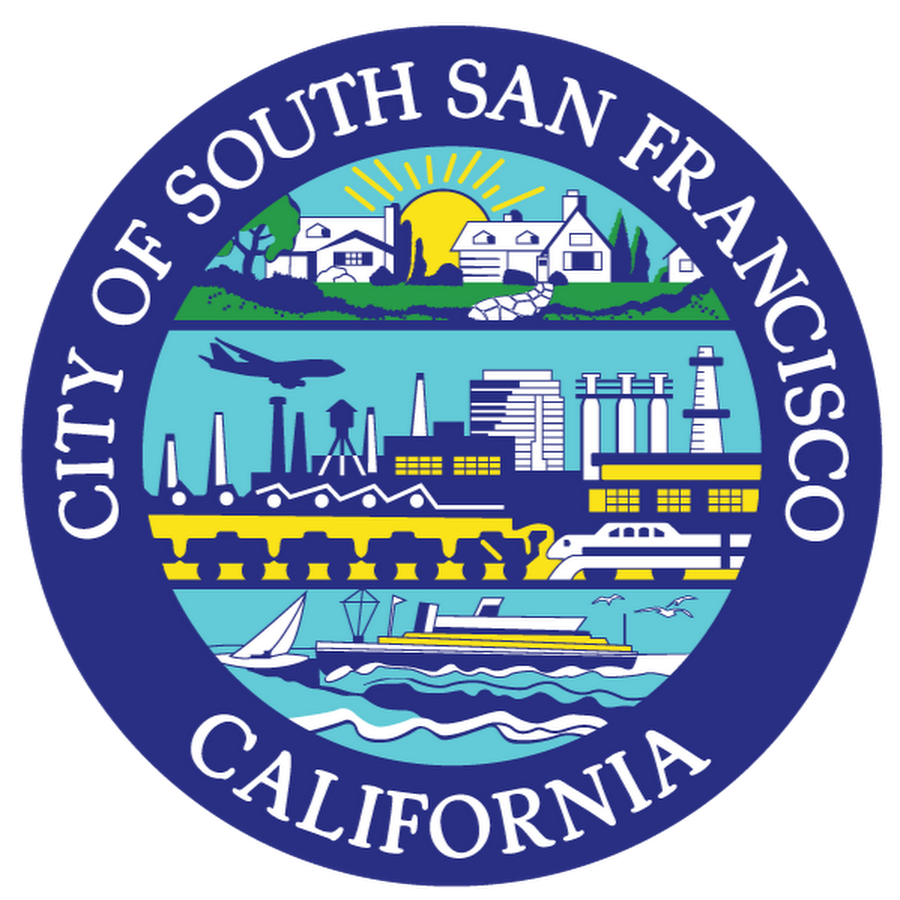
Seal of the City of South San Francisco

Seal of the City of Sunnyvale

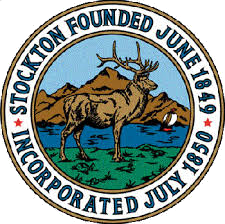
Seal of the City of Stockton

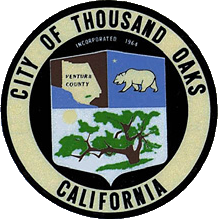
Seal of the City of Thousand Oaks

Logo of the City of Torrance

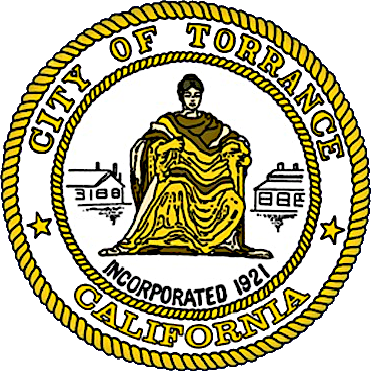
Seal of the City of Torrance

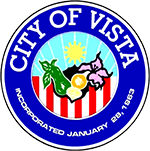
Seal of the City of Vista

Seal of the City of West Hollywood

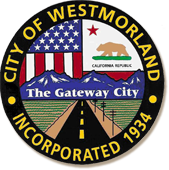
Seal of the City of Westmorland

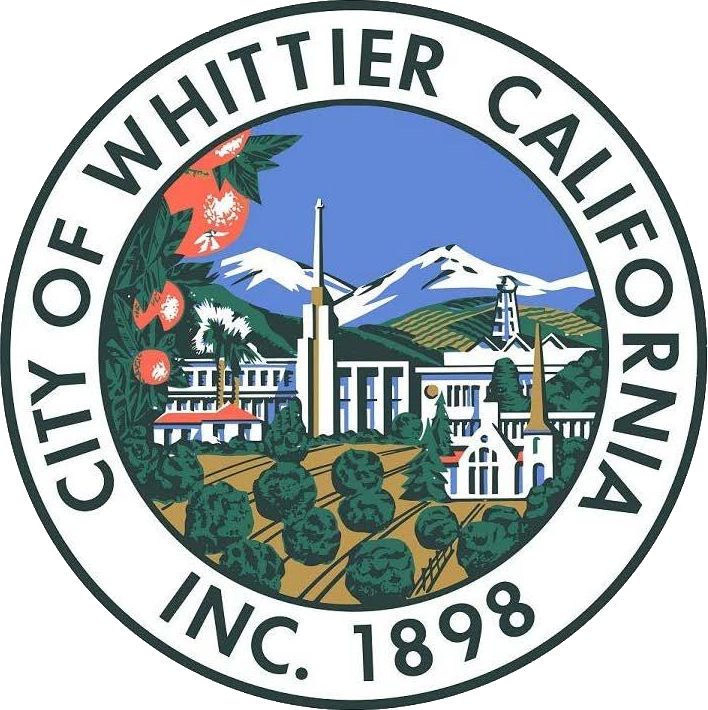
Seal of the City of Whittier

=== Municipal organizations ===
Seal of the Los Angeles County Fire Department

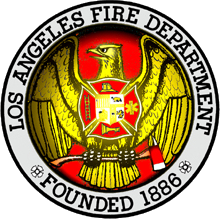
Seal of the Los Angeles Fire Department

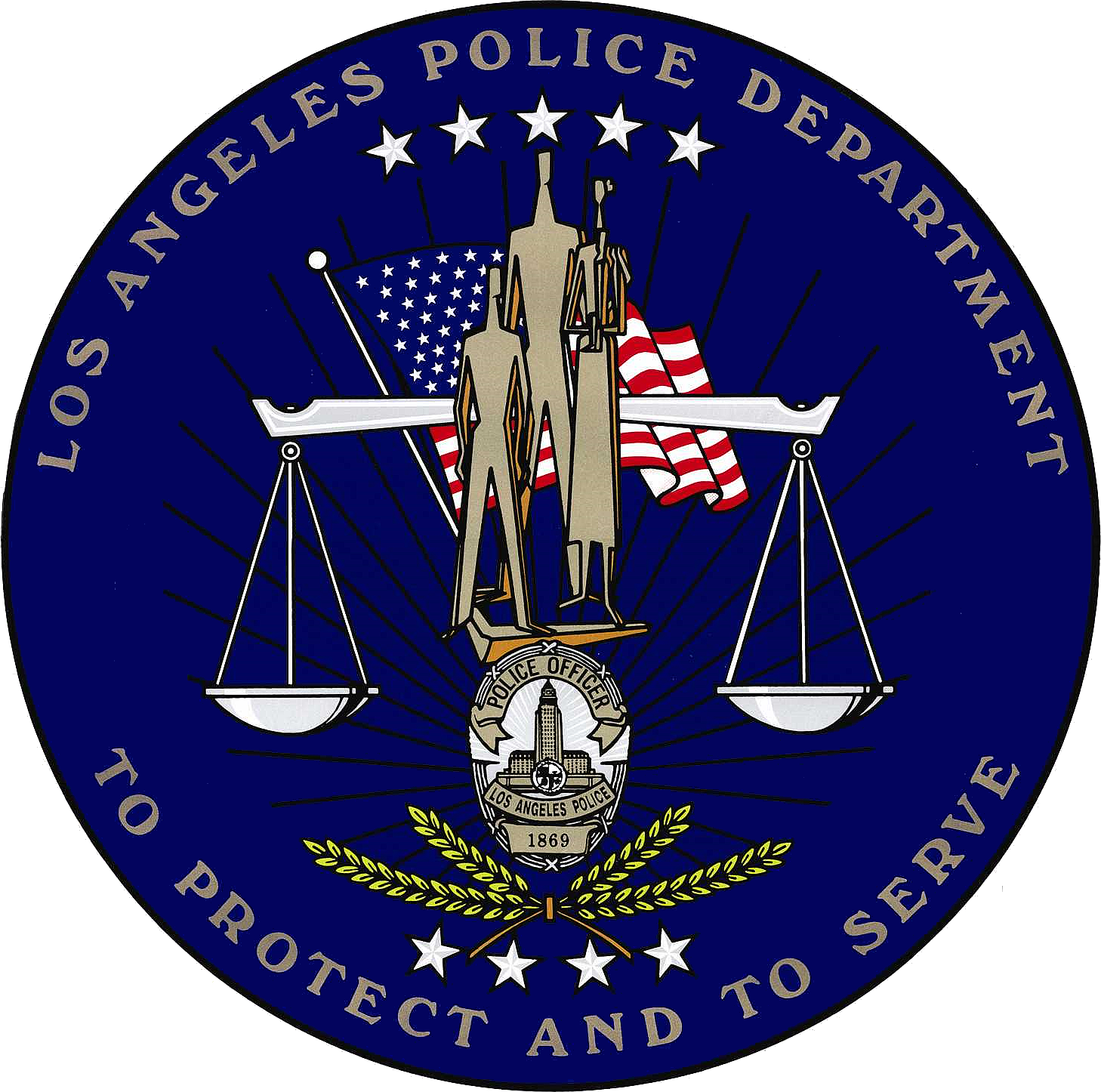
Seal of the Los Angeles Police Department

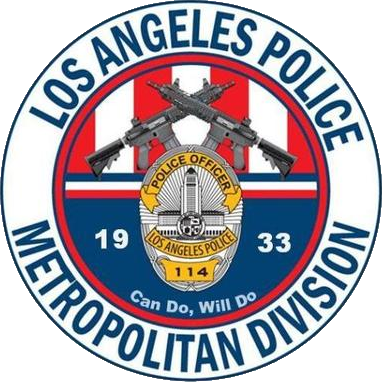
Seal of the LAPD Metropolitan Division

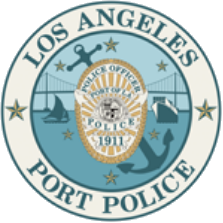
Seal of the Los Angeles Port Police

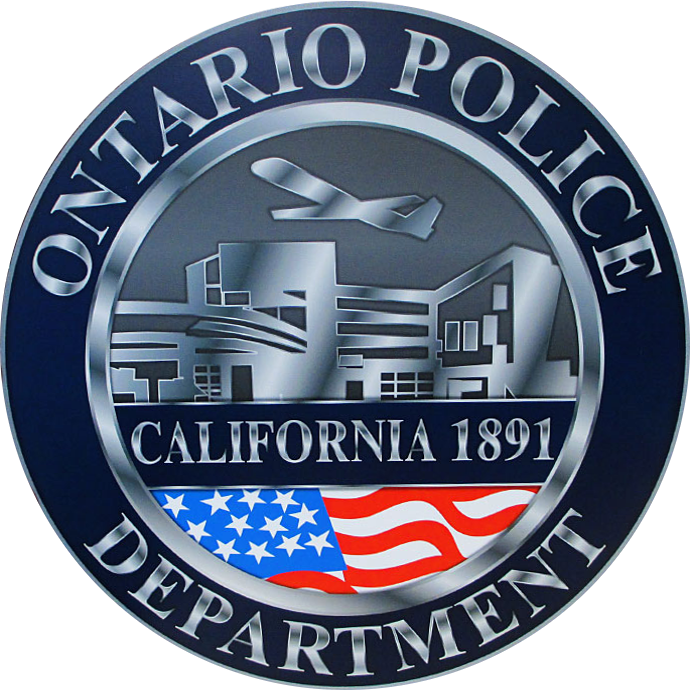
Seal of the Ontario Police Department

=== Historical ===
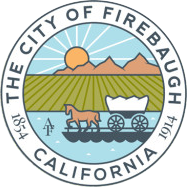
Seal of the City of Firebaugh (2005–2015)

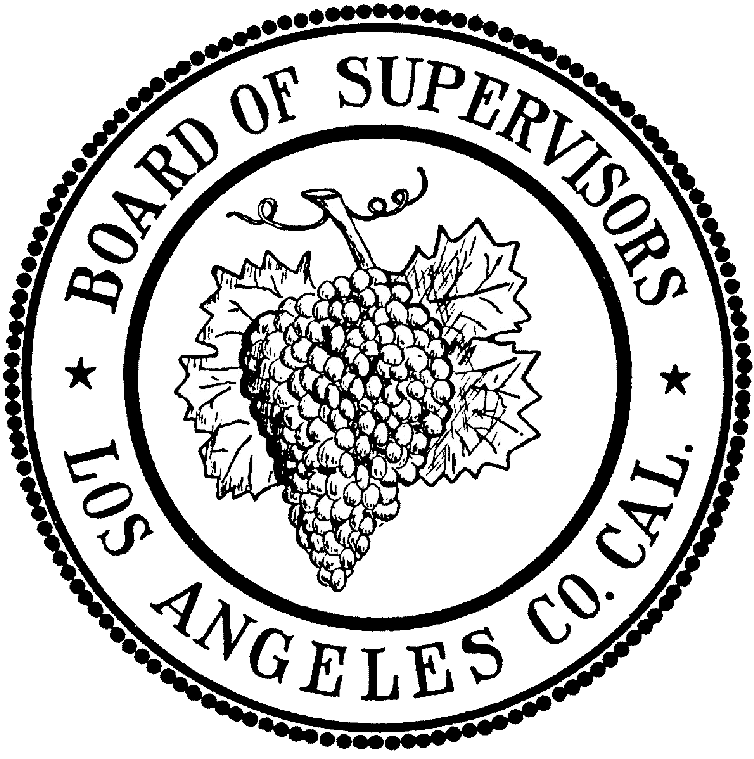
Seal of the County of Los Angeles (1887–1957)

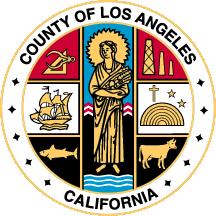
Seal of the County of Los Angeles (1957–2004)

Seal of the County of Los Angeles (2004–2014, readopted in 2016)

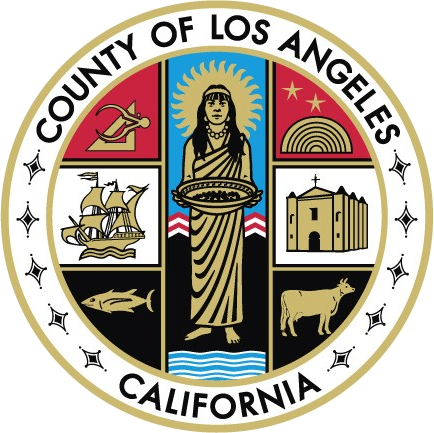
Seal of the County of Los Angeles (2014–2016)

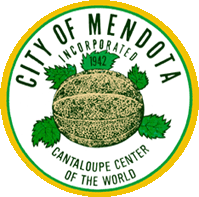
Seal of the City of Mendota (2004–2014)

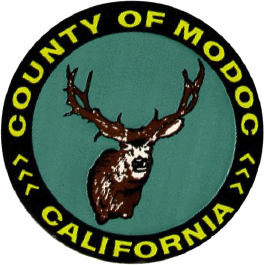
Seal of the County of Modoc (2006)

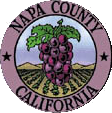
Seal of the County of Napa (2005)

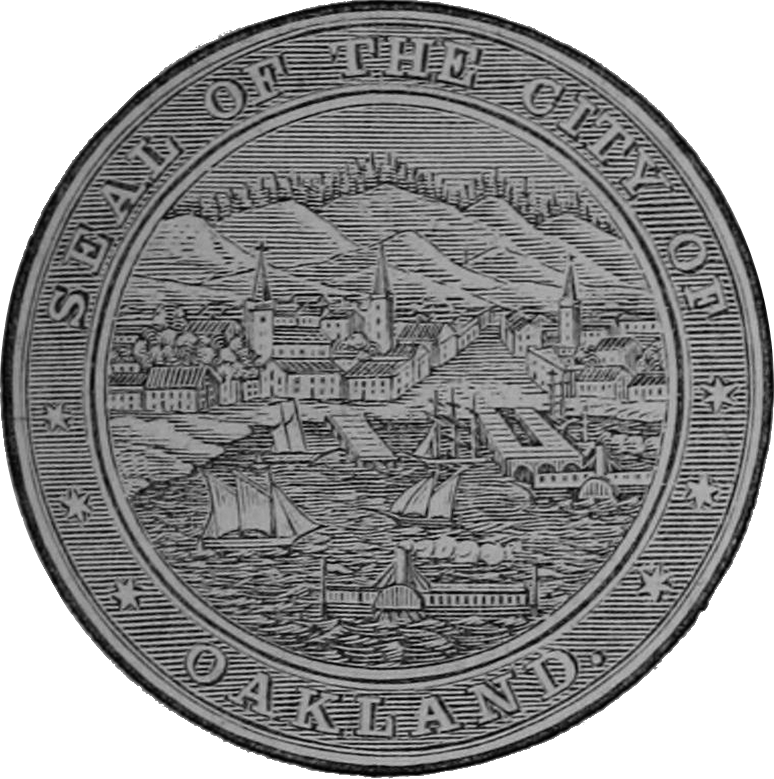
Seal of the City of Oakland (1853–1916)

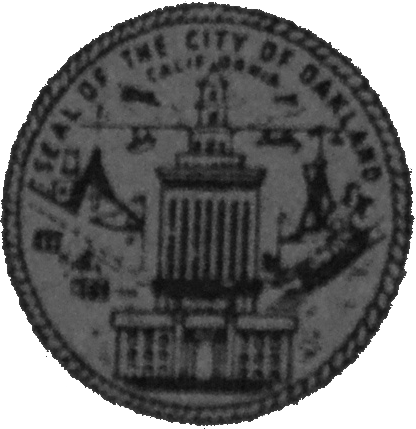
Seal of the City of Oakland (1917–1961)

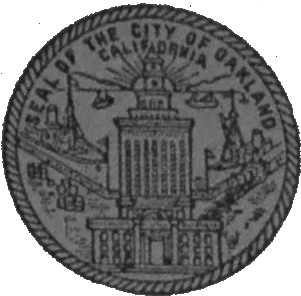
Seal of the City of Oakland (1961–1972)

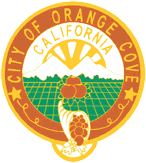
Seal of the City of Orange Cove (2003)

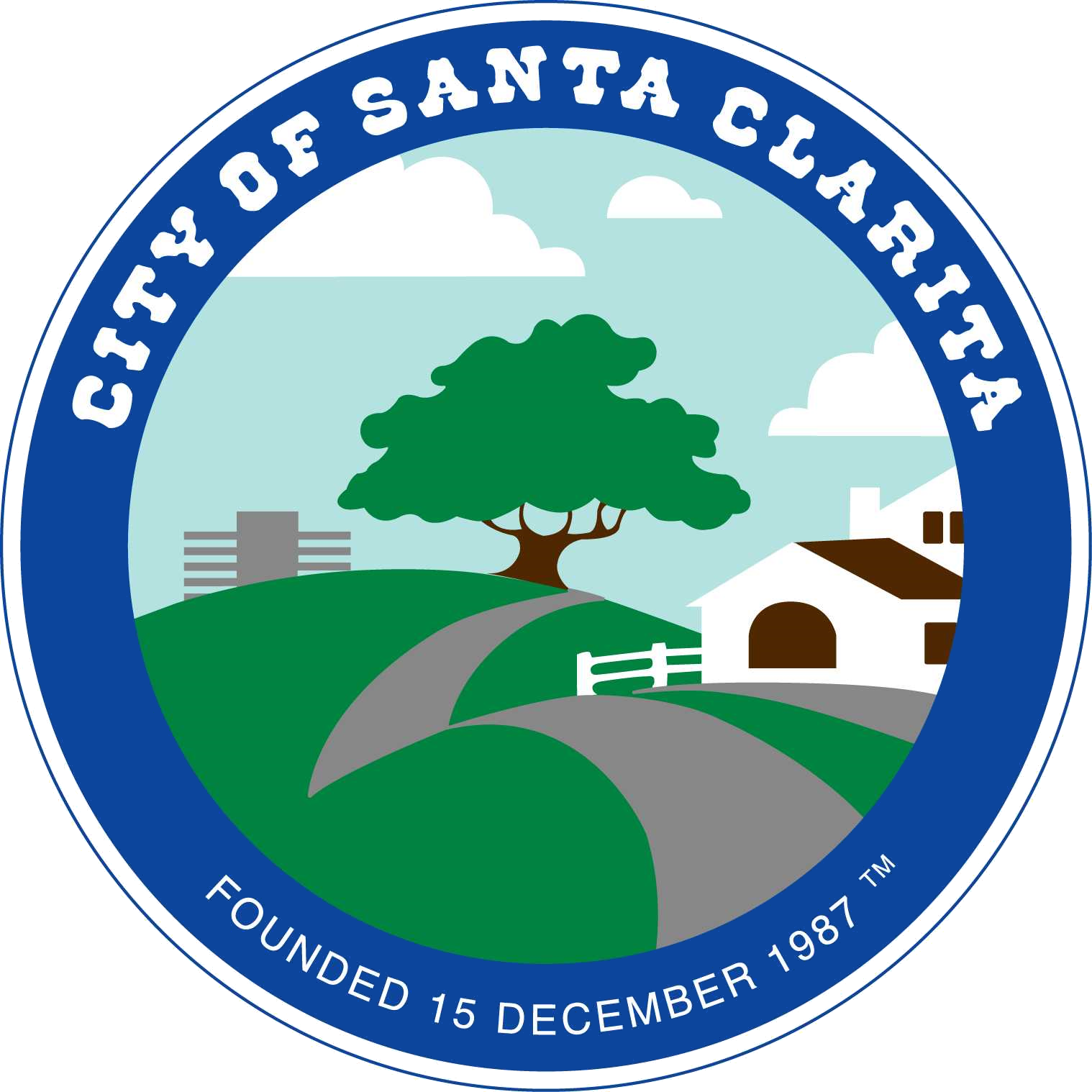
Seal of the City of Santa Clarita (2000–2007)

== District of Columbia ==
Seal of the District of Columbia

== Florida ==
=== Counties ===
Logo of Alachua County

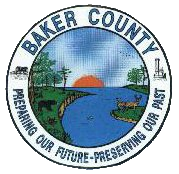
Seal of Baker County

Seal of Bay County

Seal of Bradford County

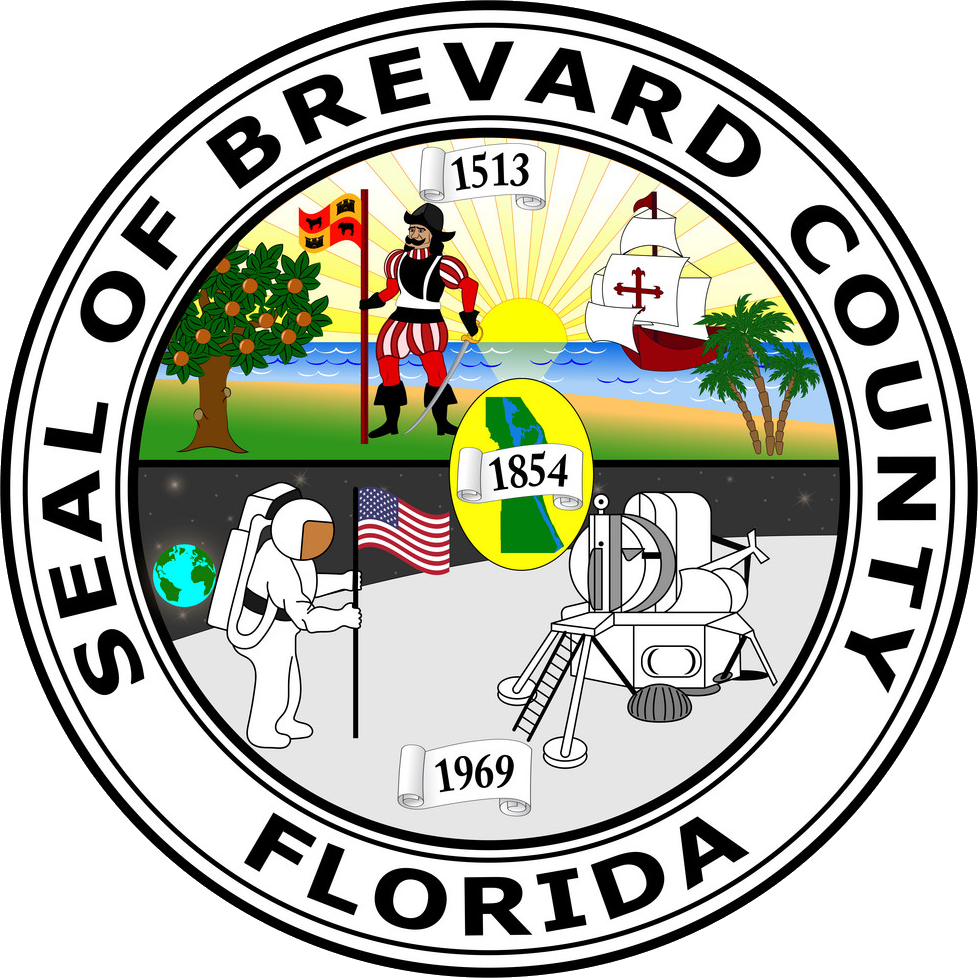
Seal of Brevard County

Logo of Broward County

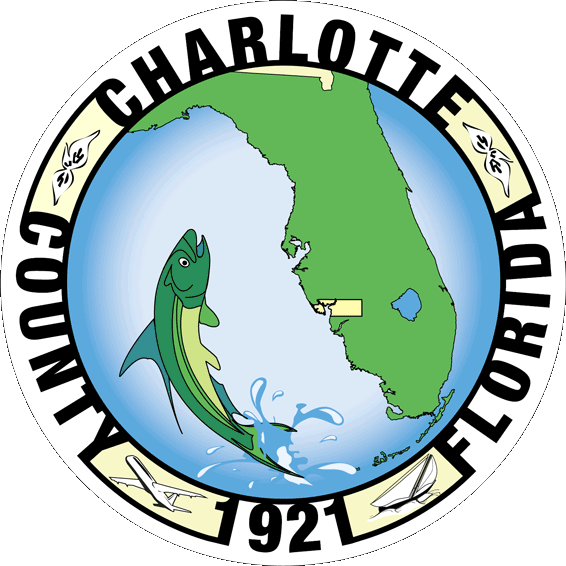
Seal of Charlotte County

Logo of Charlotte County

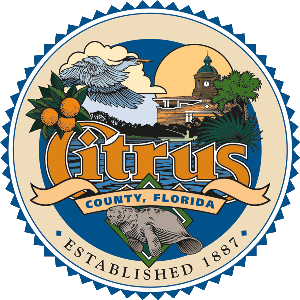
Seal of Citrus County

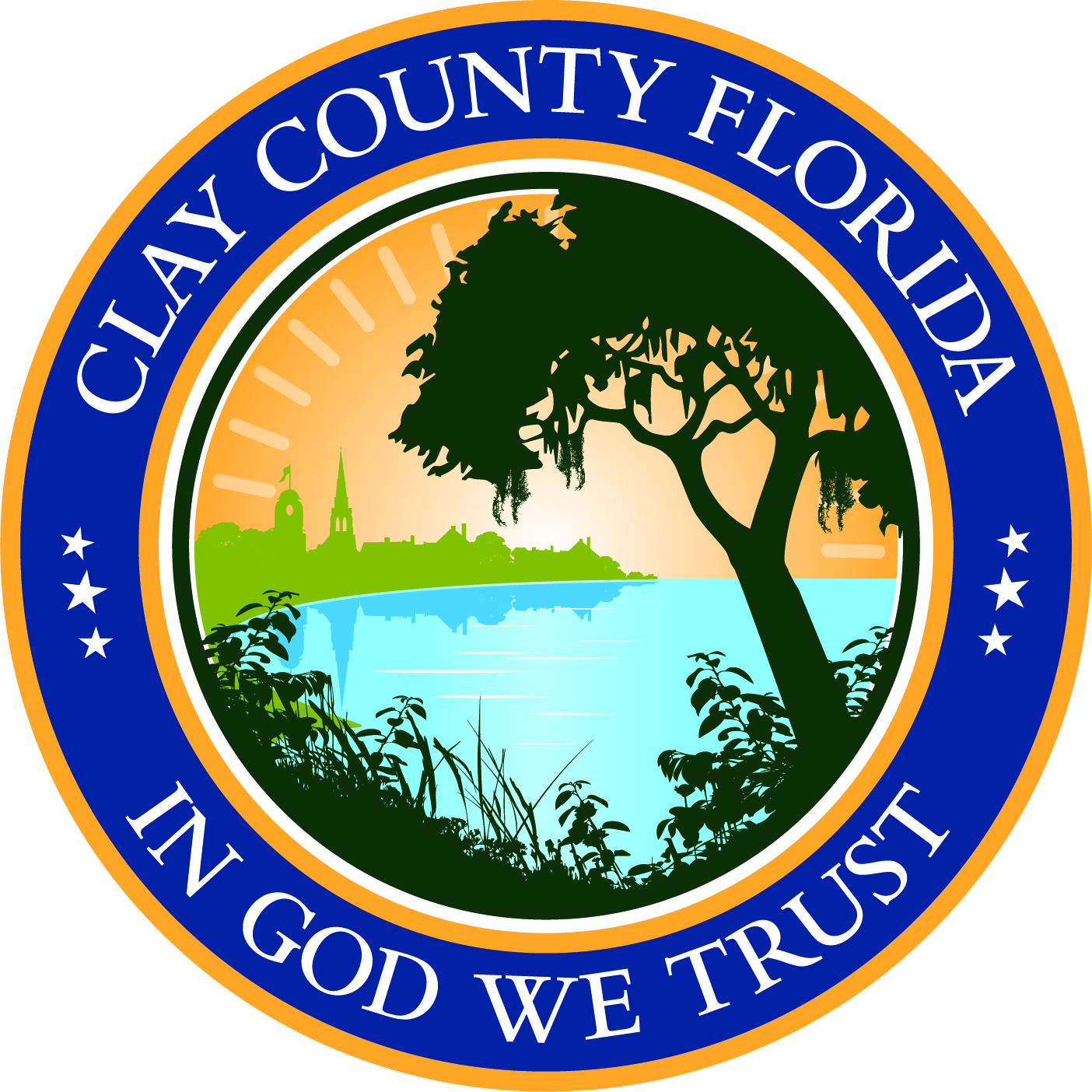
Seal of Clay County

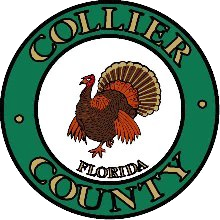
Seal of Collier County

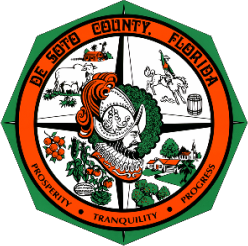
Seal of DeSoto County

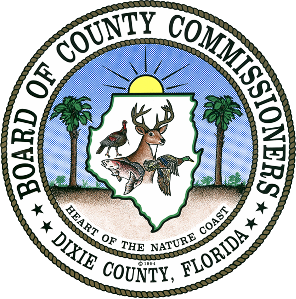
Seal of Dixie County

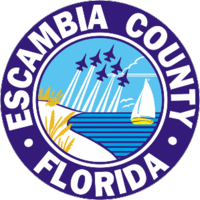
Seal of Escambia County

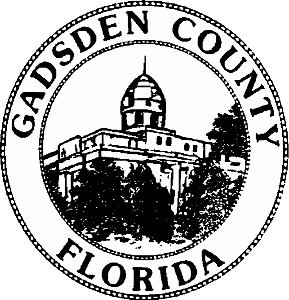
Seal of Gadsden County

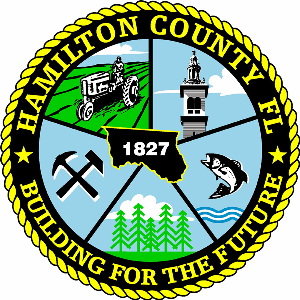
Seal of Hamilton County

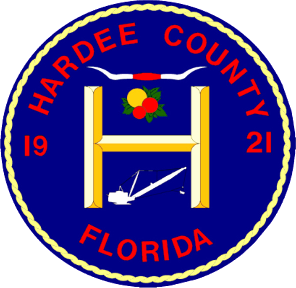
Seal of Hardee County

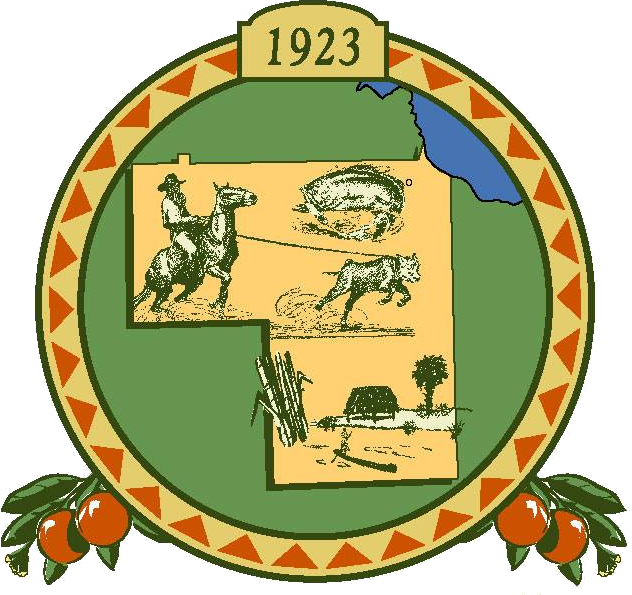
Seal of Hendry County

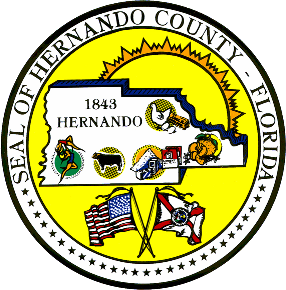
Seal of Hernando County

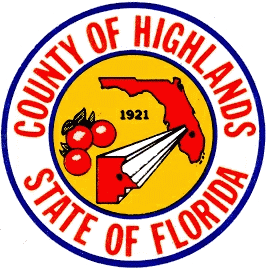
Seal of the County of Highlands

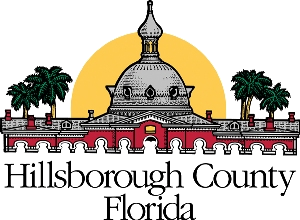
Logo of Hillsborough County

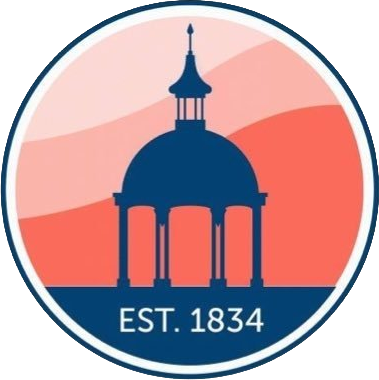
Seal of Hillsborough County

Wordmark of Hillsborough County

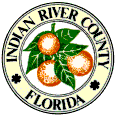
Seal of Indian River County

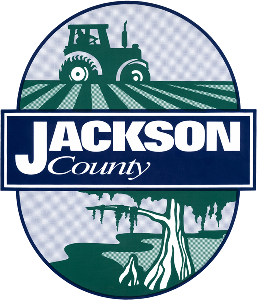
Seal of Jackson County

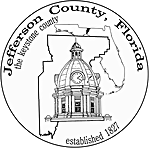
Seal of Jefferson County

Seal of Lake County

Logo of Lee County

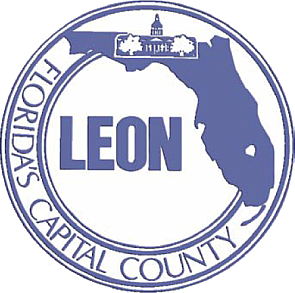
Seal of Leon County

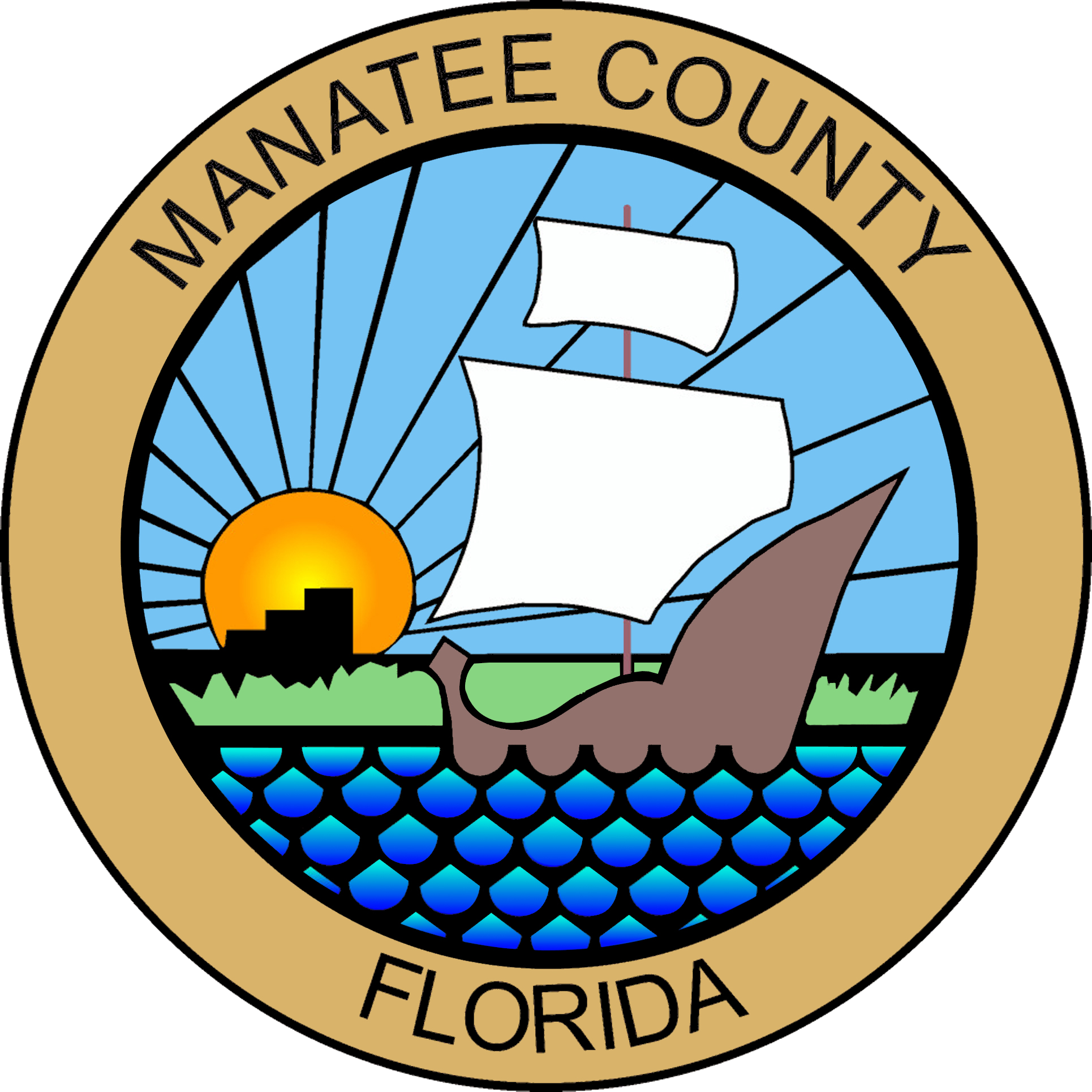
Seal of Manatee County

Seal of Manatee County

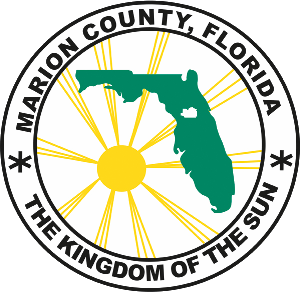
Seal of Marion County

Seal of Martin County

Seal of Miami-Dade County

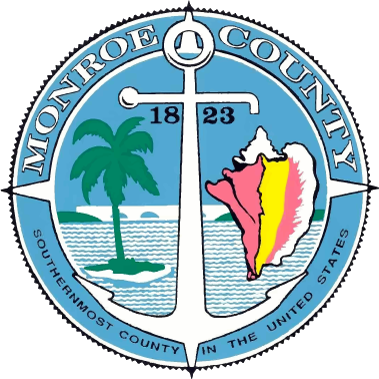
Seal of Monroe County

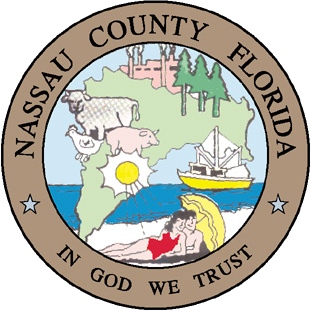
Seal of Nassau County

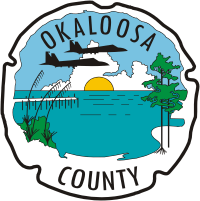
Seal of Okaloosa County

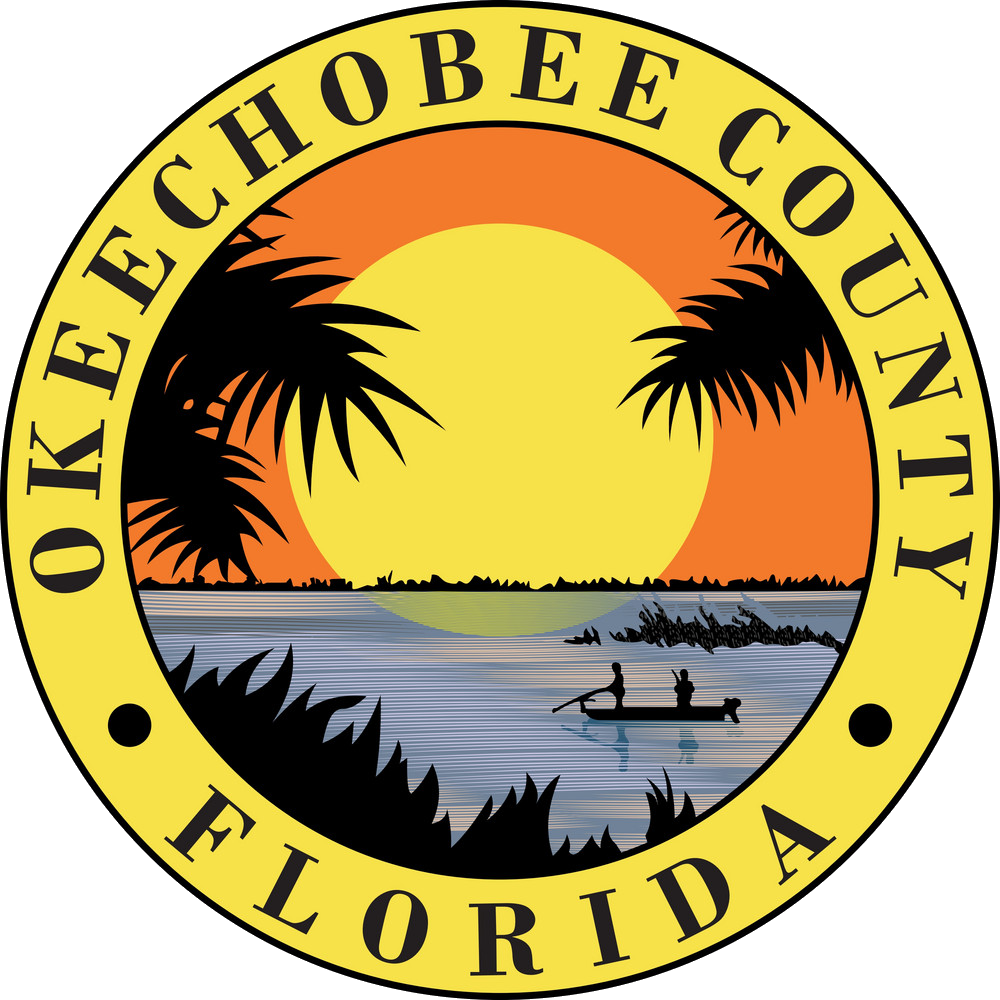
Seal of Okeechobee County

Seal of Orange County

Logo of Orange County

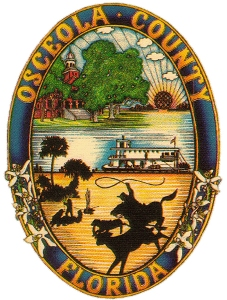
Seal of Osceola County

Logo of Osceola County

Seal of Palm Beach County

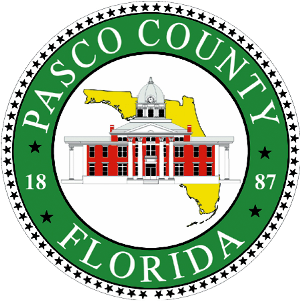
Seal of Pasco County

Logo of Pinellas County

Seal of Polk County

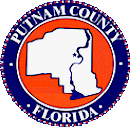
Seal of Putnam County

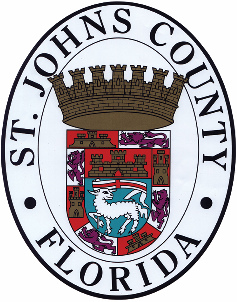
Seal of St. Johns County

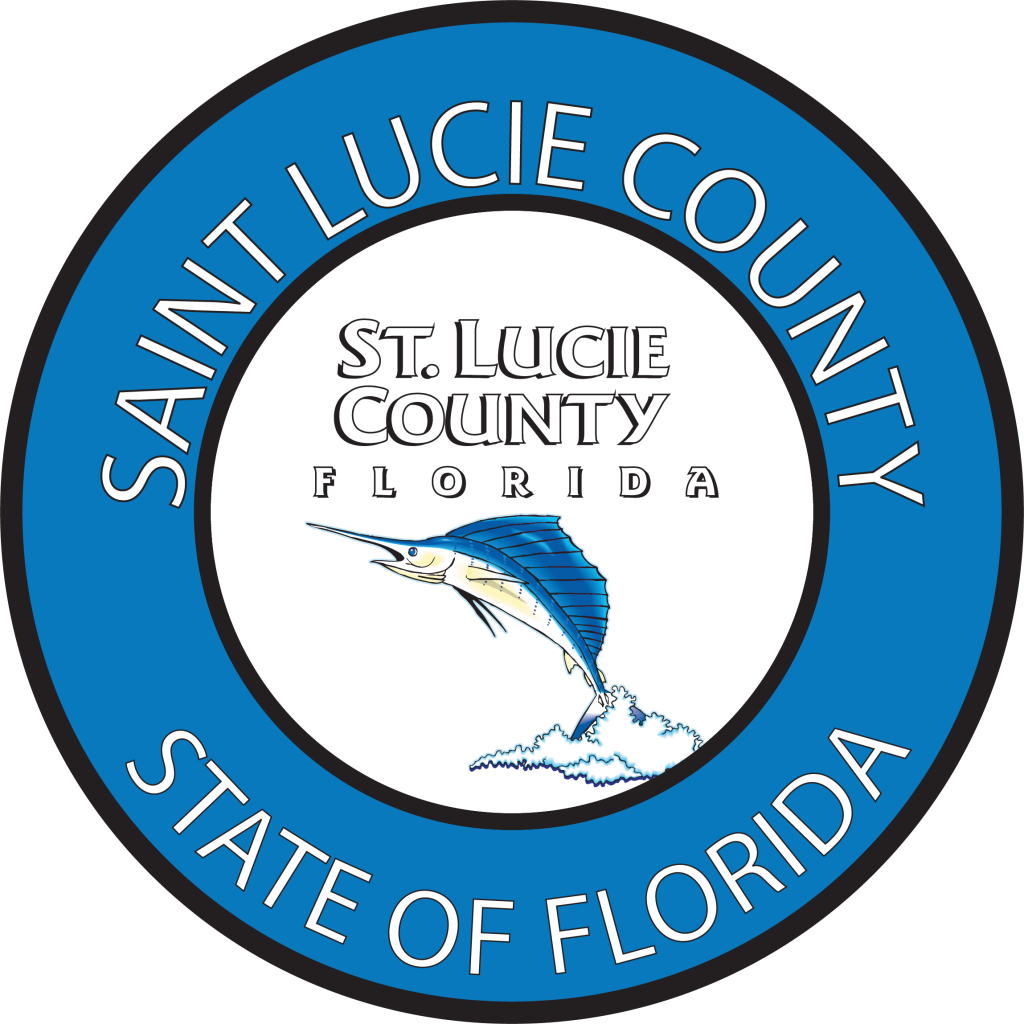
Seal of St. Lucie County

Seal of Santa Rosa County

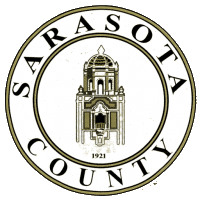
Seal of Sarasota County

Logo of Seminole County

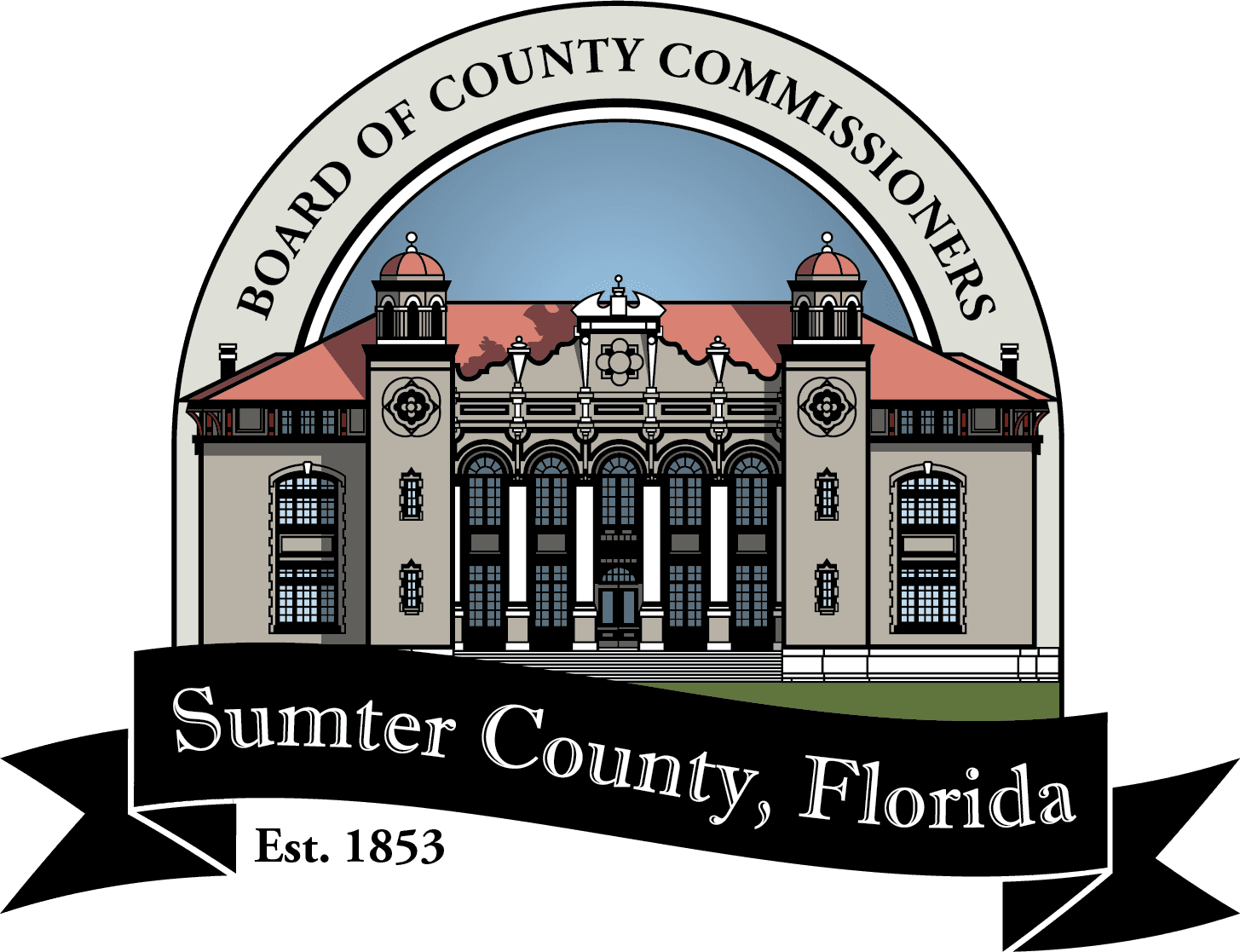
Seal of Sumter County

Seal of Suwannee County

Logo of Volusia County

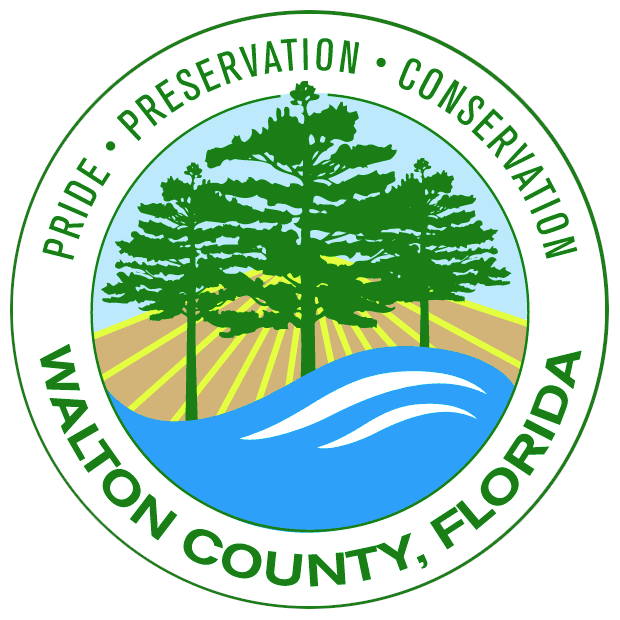
Seal of Walton County

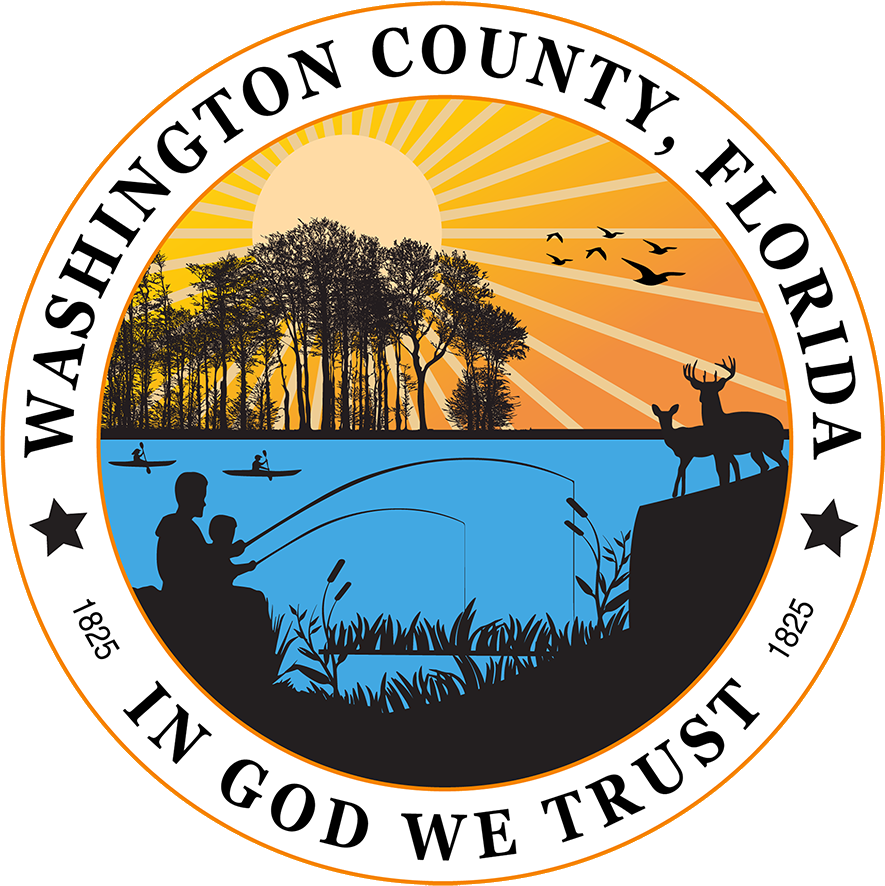
Seal of Washington County

=== Cities and towns ===
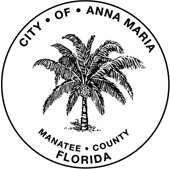
Seal of the City of Anna Maria

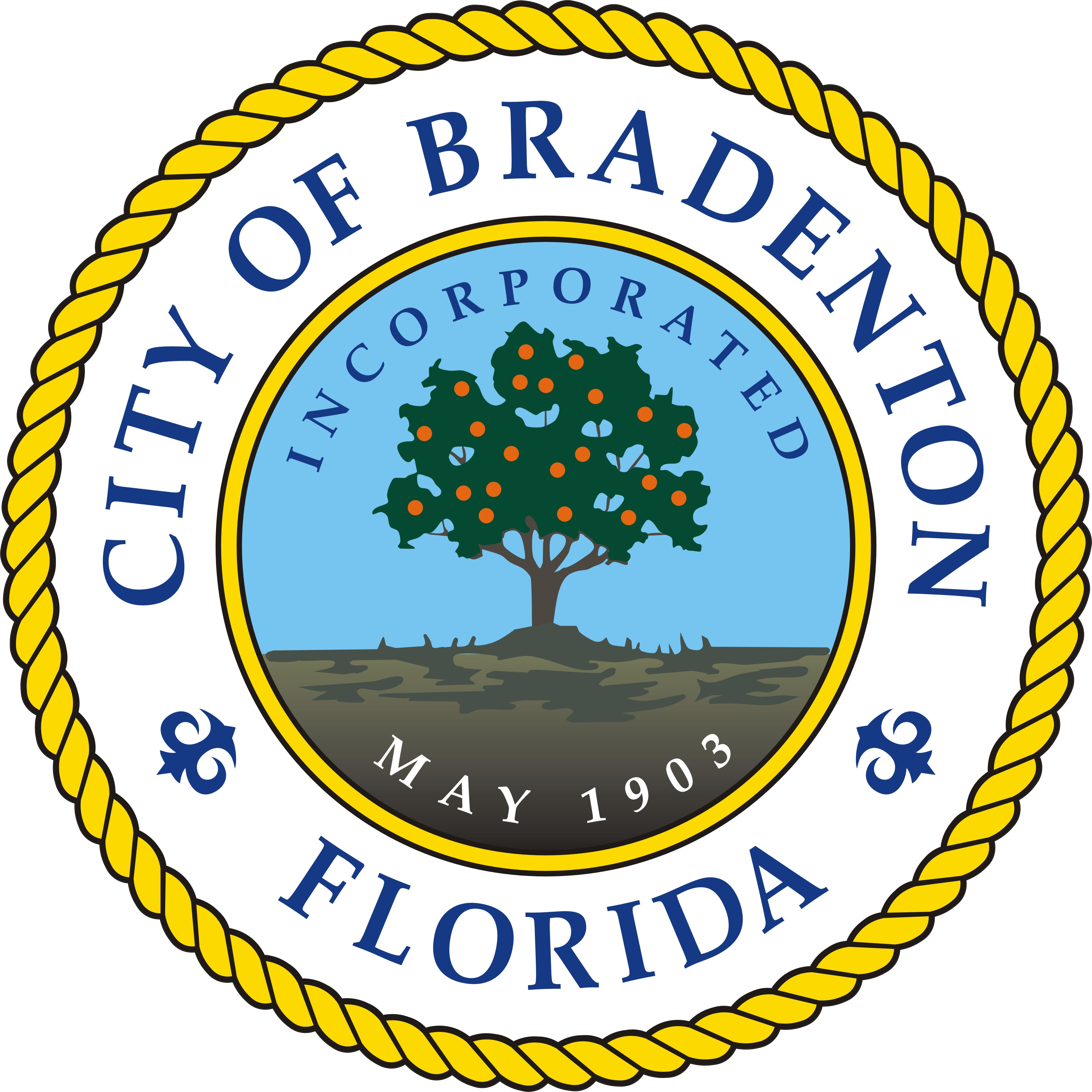
Seal of the City of Bradenton

Wordmark of the City of Bradenton

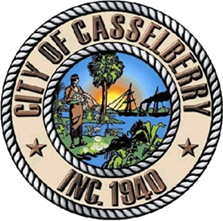
Seal of the City of Casselberry

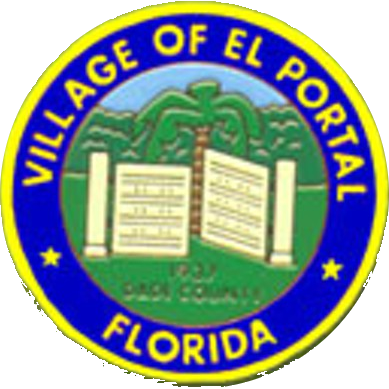
Seal of the Village of El Portal

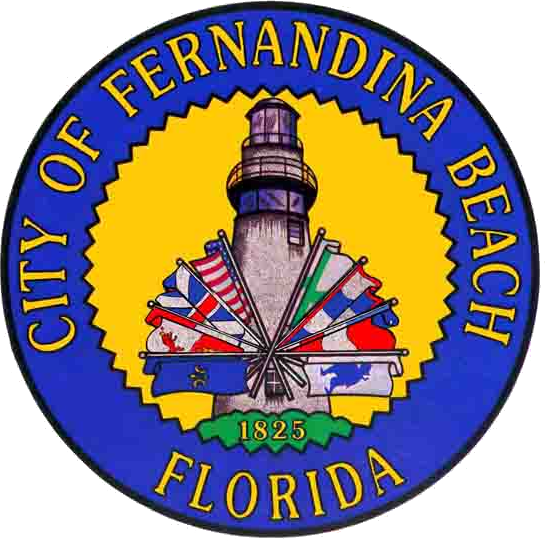
Seal of the City of Fernandina Beach

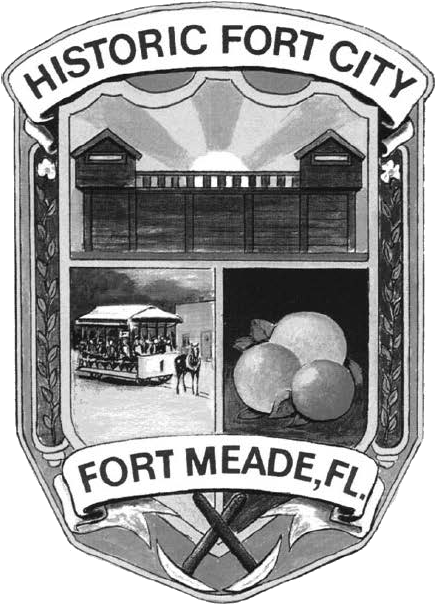
Seal of the City of Fort Meade

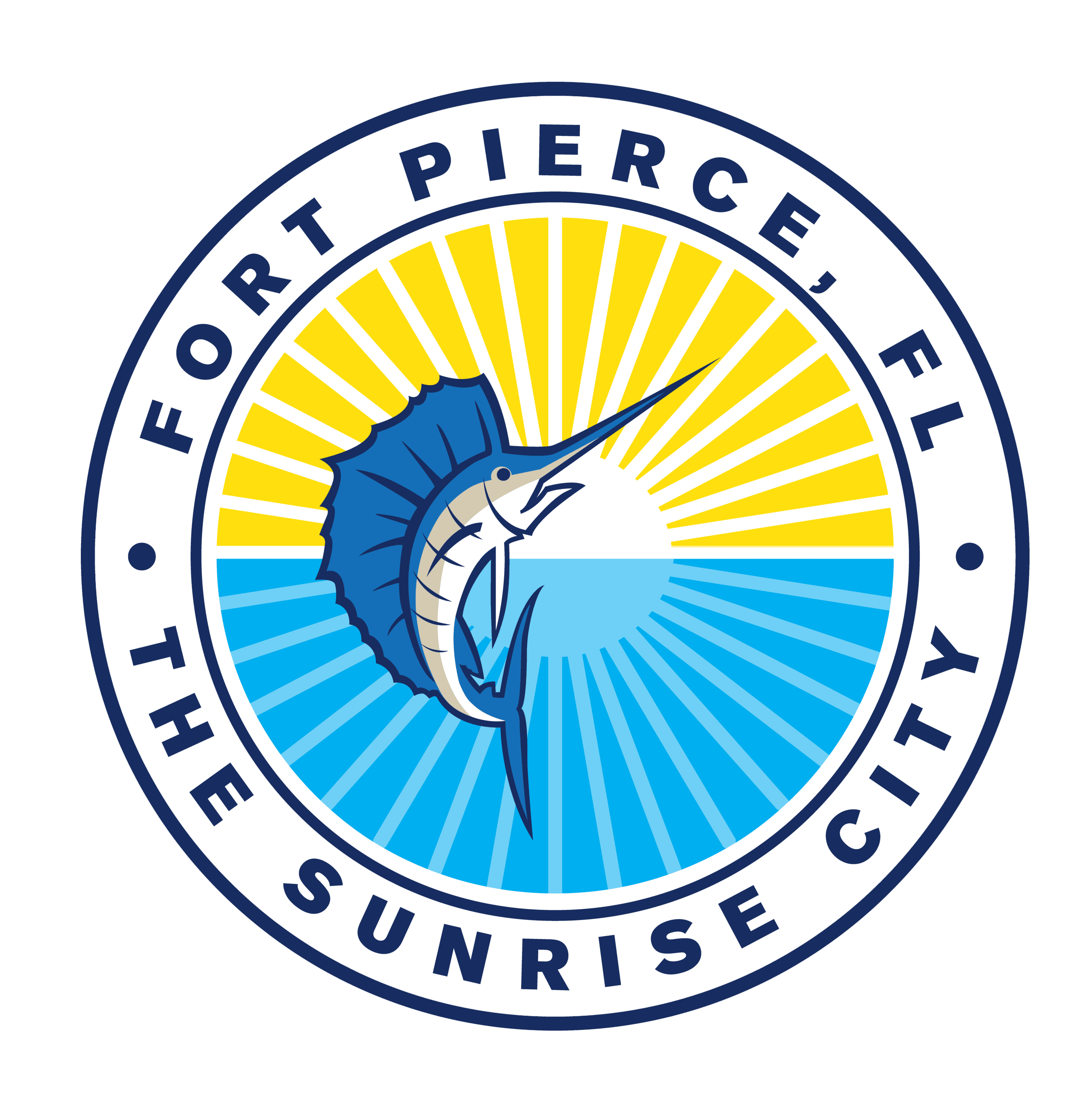
Seal of the City of Fort Pierce

Seal of the City of Hialeah Gardens

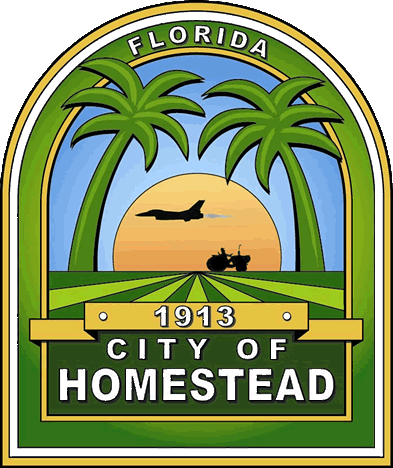
Seal of the City of Homestead

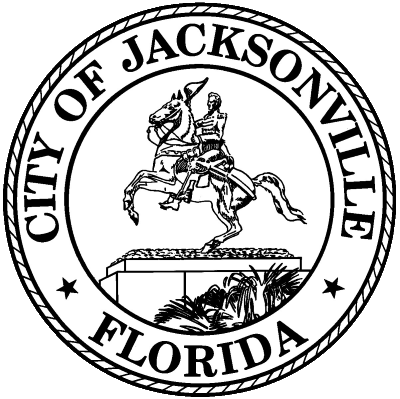
Seal of the City of Jacksonville

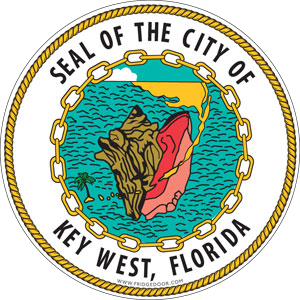
Seal of the City of Key West

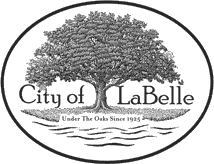
Seal of the City of LaBelle

Seal of the City of Melbourne

Seal of the City of Miami

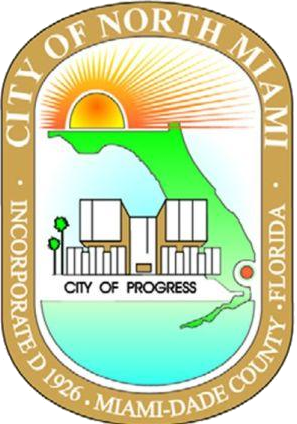
Seal of the City of North Miami

Seal of the City of Orlando

Seal of the City of Palm Beach

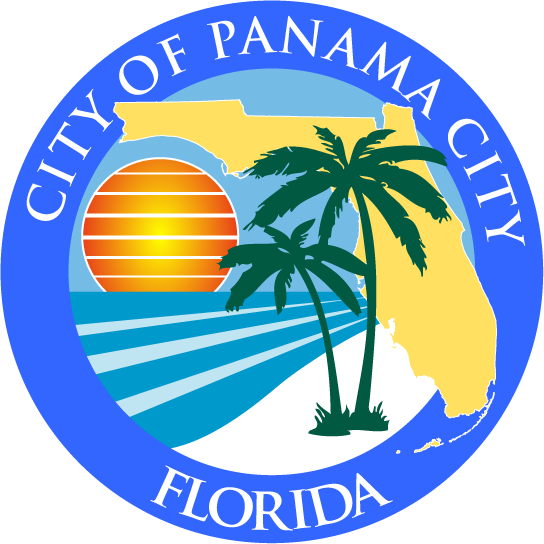
Seal of the City of Panama City

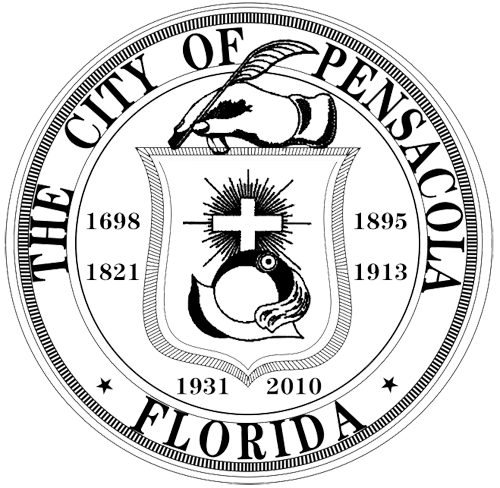
Seal of the City of Pensacola

Seal of the City of Pembroke Pines

Seal of the City of Pompano Beach

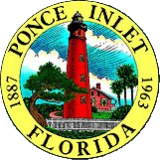
Seal of the Town of Ponce Inlet

Coat of arms of the City of St. Augustine

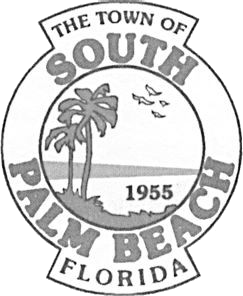
Seal of the Town of South Palm Beach

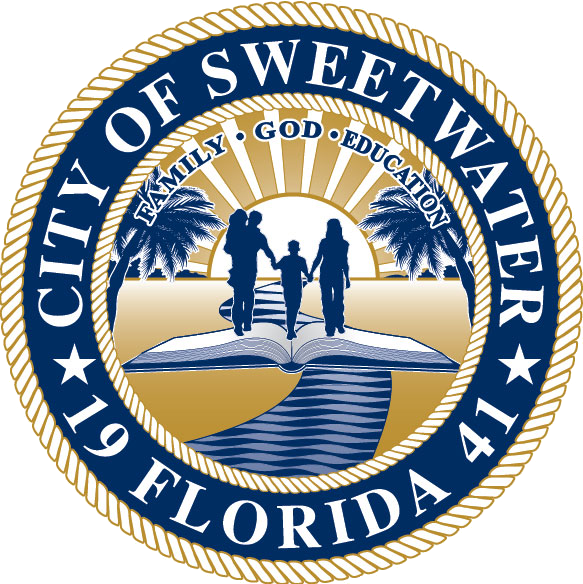
Seal of the City of Sweetwater

Logo of the City of Tallahassee

Seal of the City of Tallahassee

Seal of the City of Tampa

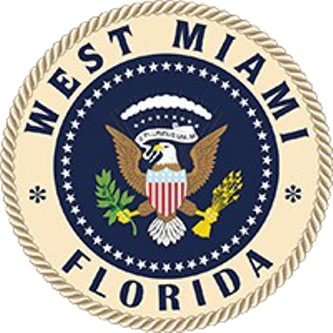
Seal of City of West Miami

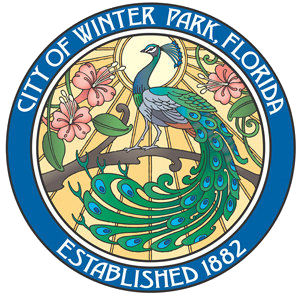
Seal of the City of Winter Park

=== Historical ===
Logo of Broward County (1997)

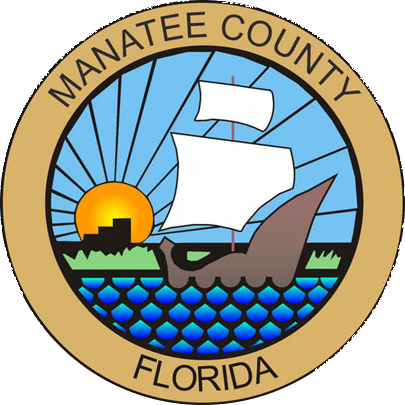
Seal of Manatee County (2007)

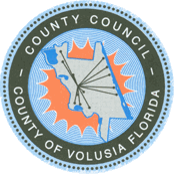
Seal of the County of Volusia (1997–2004)

== Georgia ==
Seal of the City of Atlanta

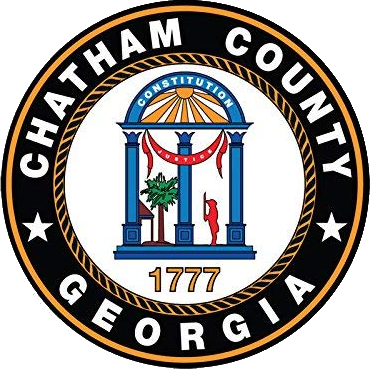
Seal of Chatham County

=== Historical ===
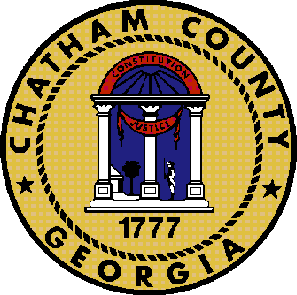
Old seal of Chatham County

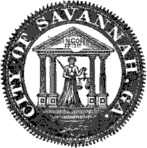
Seal of the City of Savannah (1888)

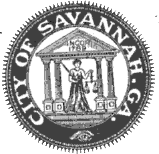
Seal of the City of Savannah (1907)

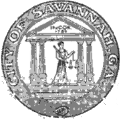
Seal of the City of Savannah (1918)

== Illinois ==
Logo of the City of Chicago

Seal of the City of Rockford

Wordmark of the City of Rockford

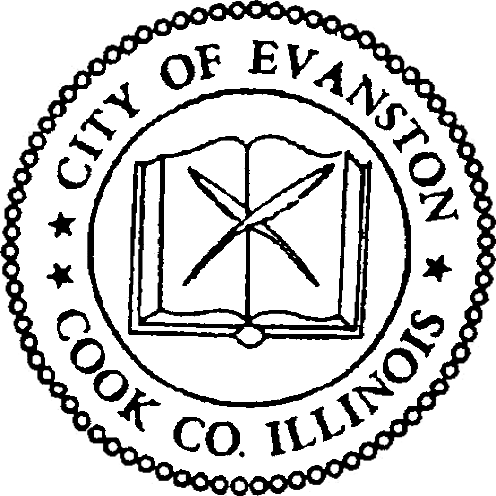
Seal of Evanston, Illinois

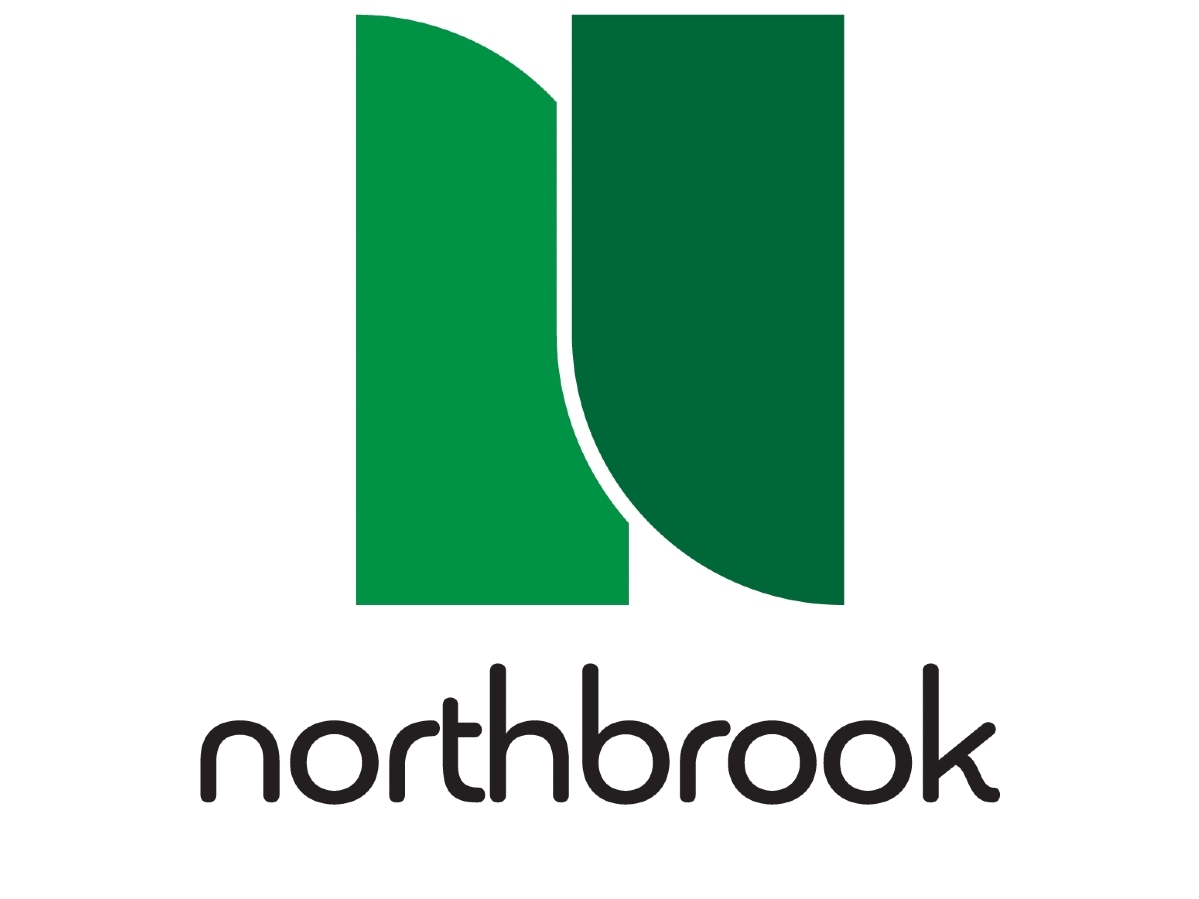
Logo of the Village of Northbrook

== Indiana ==
Seal of Bartholomew County

Seal of Madison County

Seal of Porter County

Logo of the City of Auburn

Seal of the City of Elwood

Seal of the City of Portage

Seal of the City of South Bend

=== Historical ===
Old seal of Hamilton County

== Iowa ==
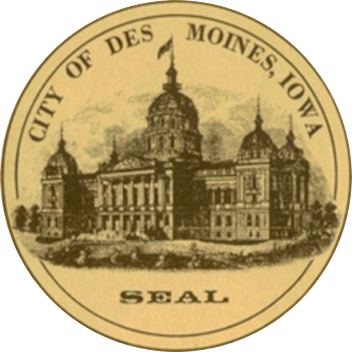
Seal of the City of Des Moines

== Kansas ==
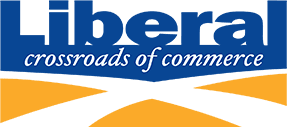
Logo of the City of Liberal

== Louisiana ==
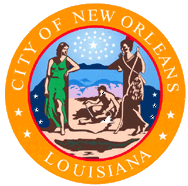
Seal of the City of New Orleans

=== Historical ===
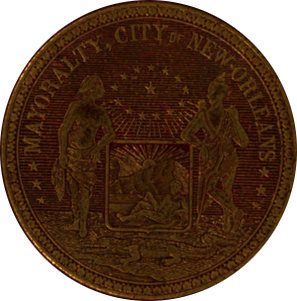
Seal of the City of New Orleans (c. 1870)

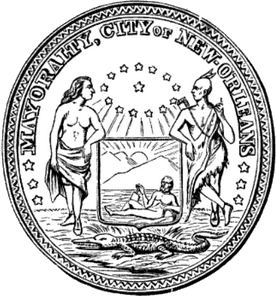
Seal of the City of New Orleans (c. 1882)

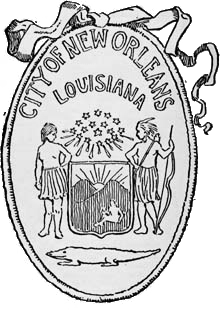
Seal of the City of New Orleans (c. 1912)

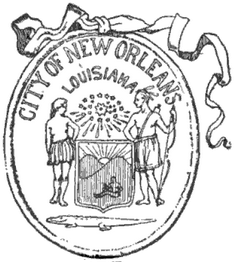
Seal of the City of New Orleans (c. 1917)

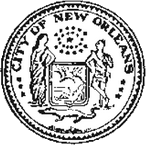
Seal of the City of New Orleans (c. 1938)

== Maine ==
=== Counties ===
Seal of York County

=== Cities and towns ===
Seal of the City of Lewiston

== Maryland ==
Seal of the City of Baltimore

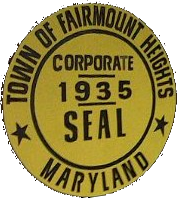
Seal of the Town of Fairmount Heights

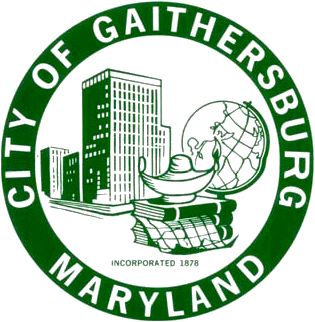
Seal of the City of Gaithersburg

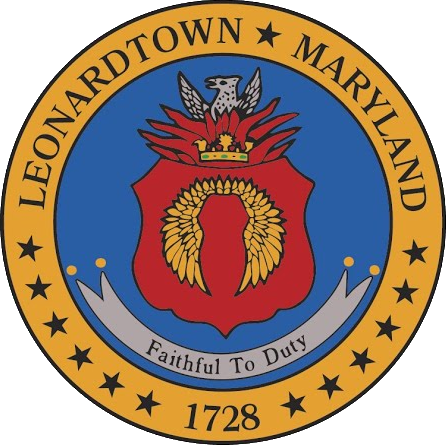
Seal of the Town of Leonardtown

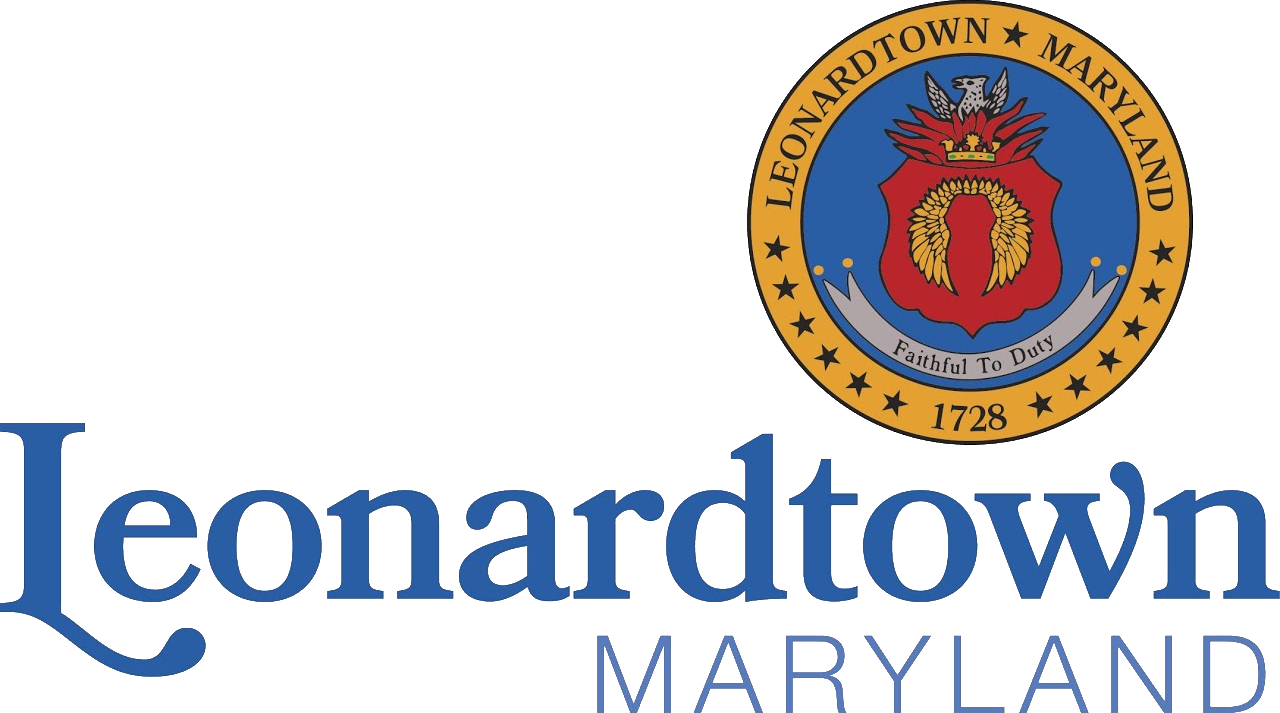
Wordmark of the Town of Leonardtown

Coat of arms of Montgomery County

Seal of the Montgomery Village Foundation

Wordmark of the Montgomery Village Foundation

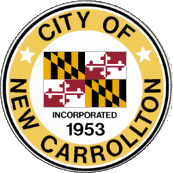
Seal of City of New Carrollton

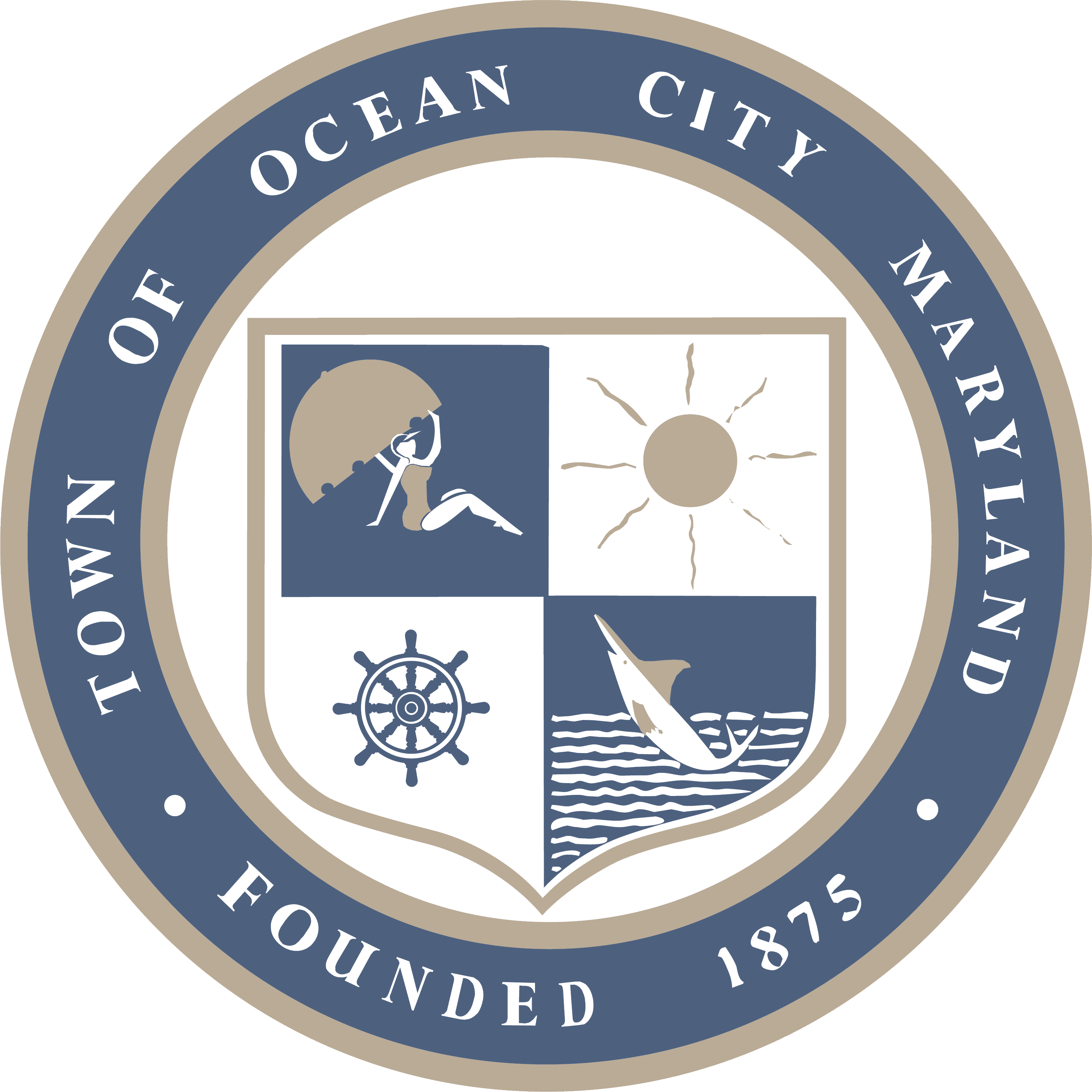
Seal of the Town of Ocean City

Coat of arms of Prince George's County

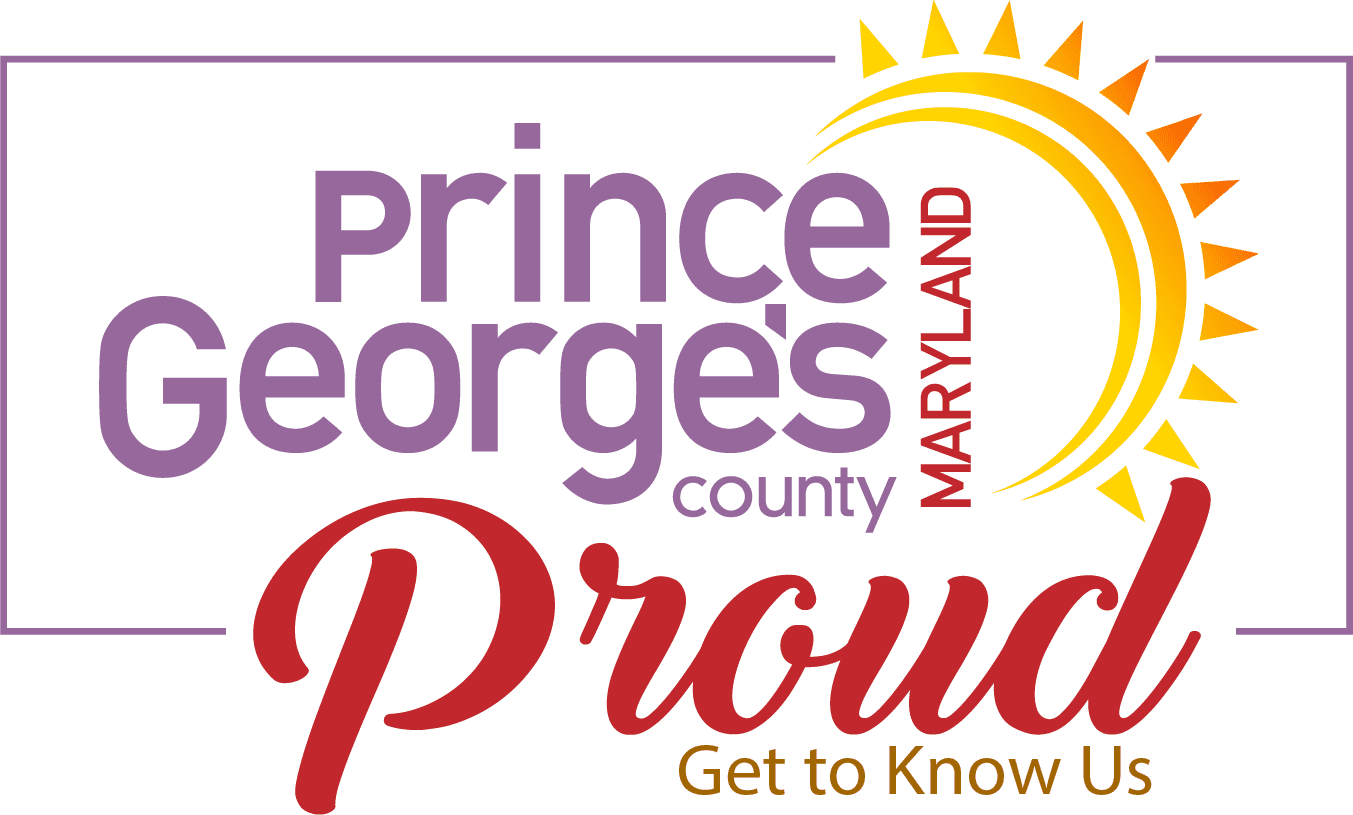
Wordmark of Prince George's County

Seal of the City of Rockville

=== County seals ===
Image	County	Adopted
	Allegany	1976
	Anne Arundel	1762, 1968, 2016
	Baltimore	1957
	Calvert	1954
	Caroline	1984
	Carroll	1977
	Charles	1954
	Cecil	1968
	Dorchester	1967
	Frederick	1957
	Garrett	1977
	Harford	1964
	Howard	1969
	Kent	1692
	Montgomery	1987
	Prince George's	1971
	Queen Anne's	1743
	Somerset	1666
	St. Mary's	1963
	Talbot	1966
	Wicomico	1965
	Worcester	1981

=== Municipal organizations ===
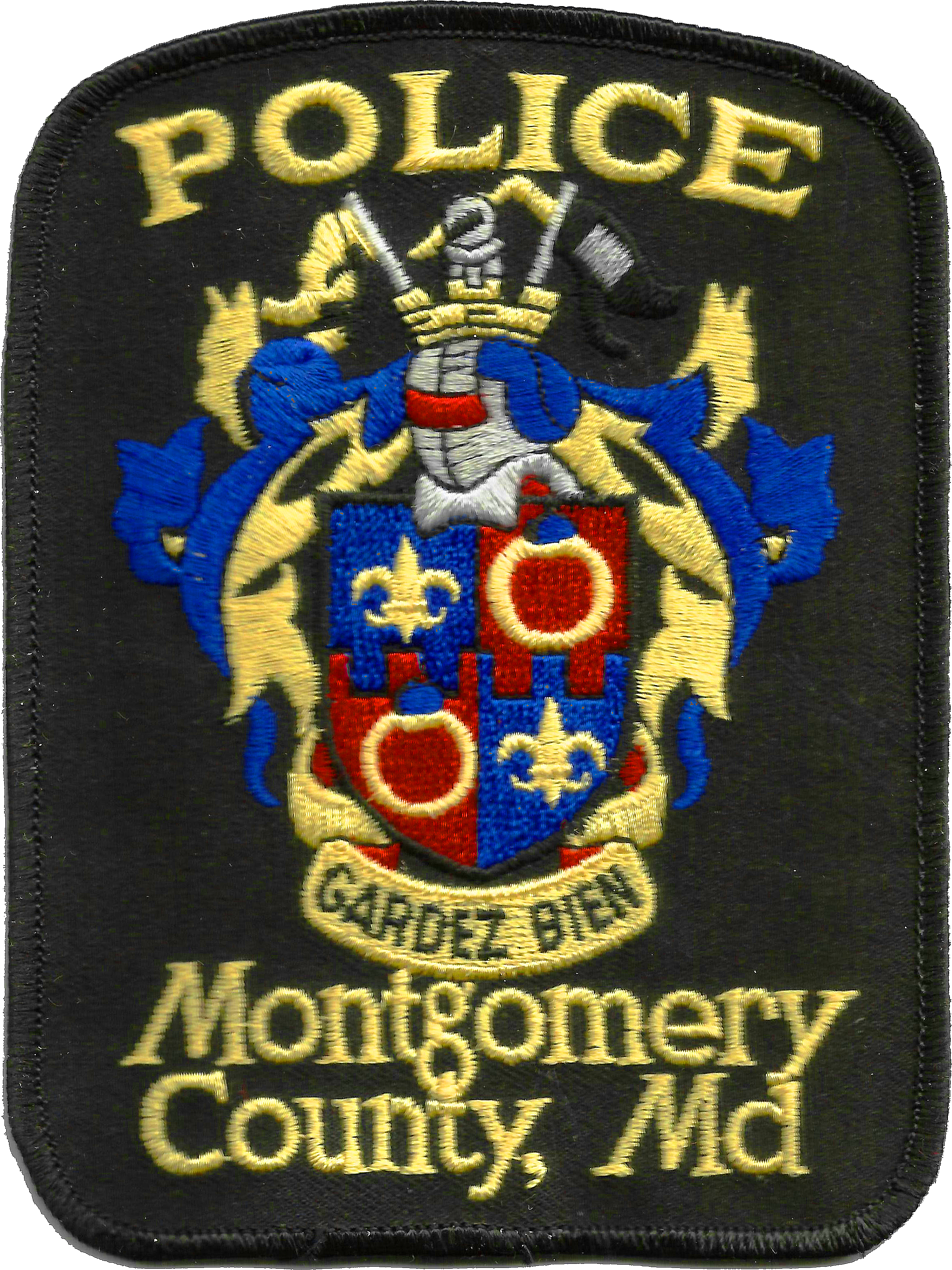
Patch of the Montgomery County Police Department

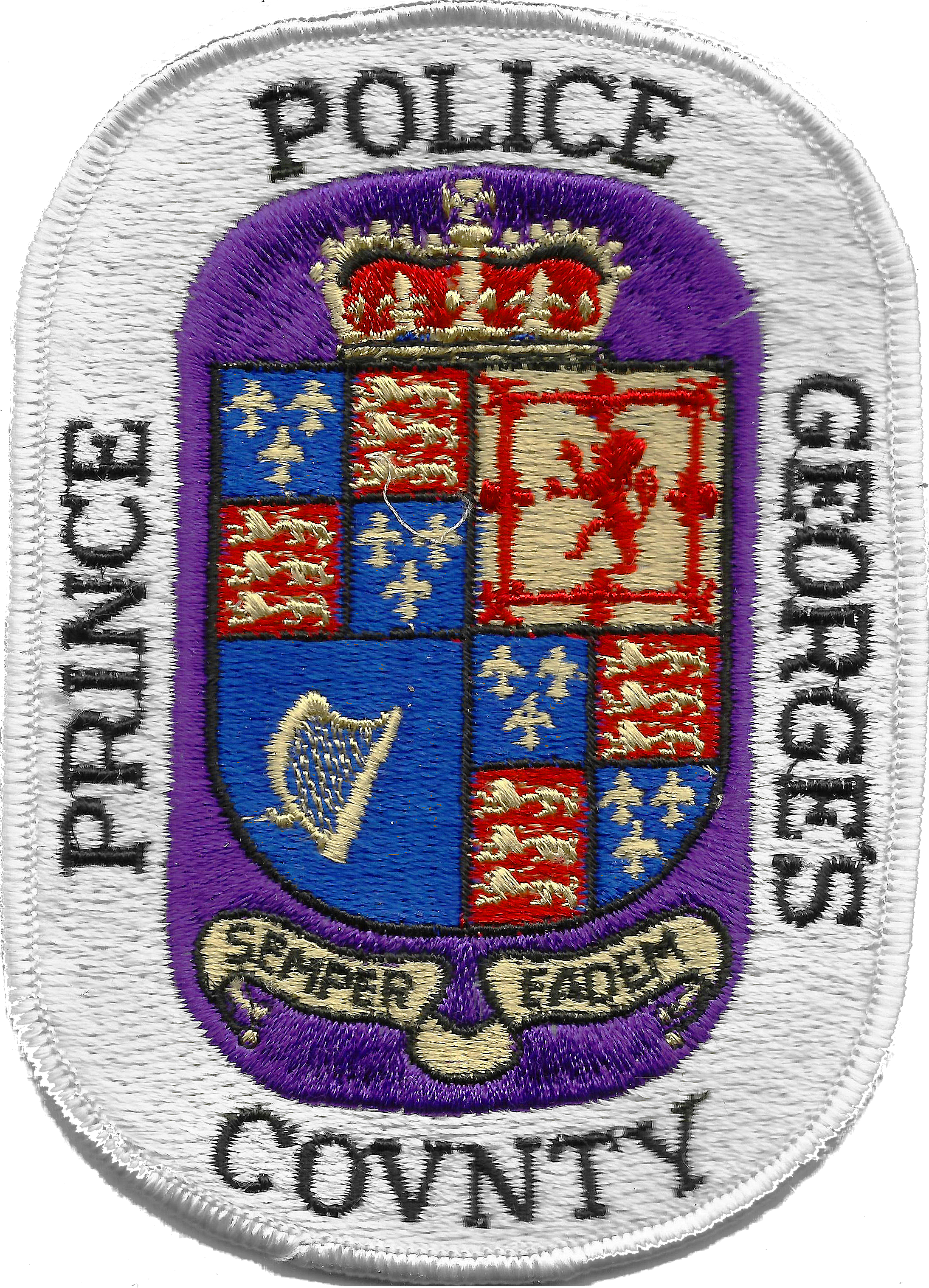
Patch of the Prince George's County Police Department

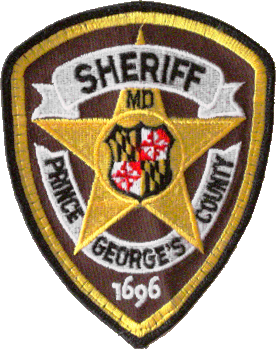
Patch of the Prince George's County Sheriff's Office

=== Historical ===
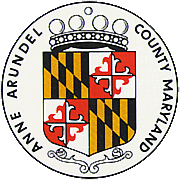
Seal of Anne Arundel County (1968–2016)

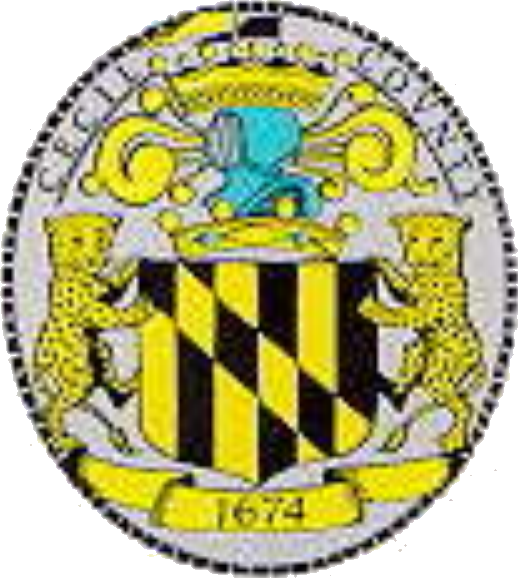
Seal of Cecil County (1674–1968)

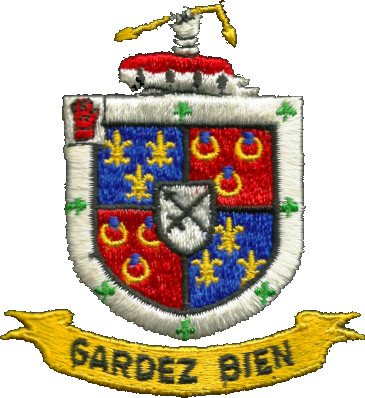
Coat of arms of Montgomery County (1944–1976)

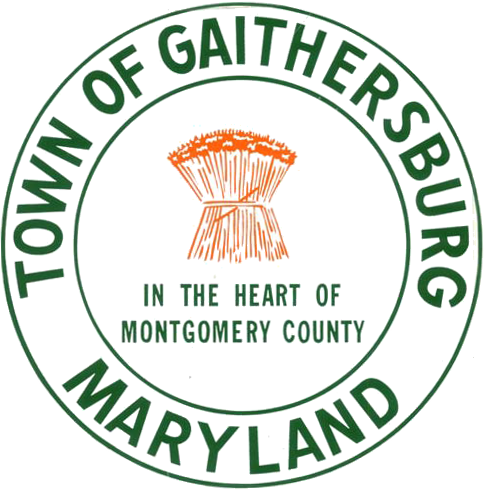
Seal of the Town of Gaithersburg (discontinued in 1967)

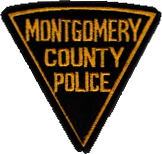
Patch of the Montgomery County Police Department (1939–1955)

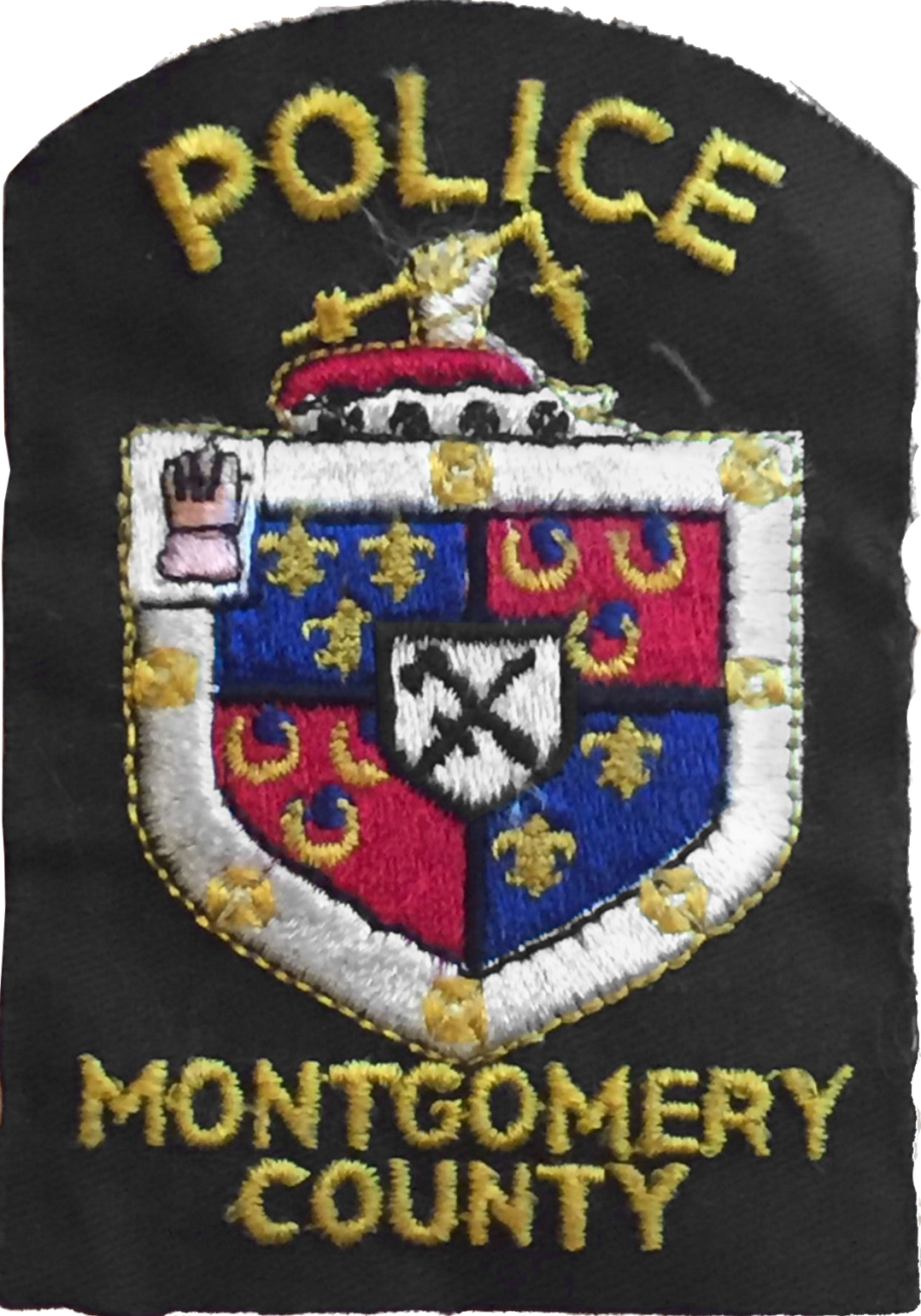
Patch of the Montgomery County Police Department (1955–1972)

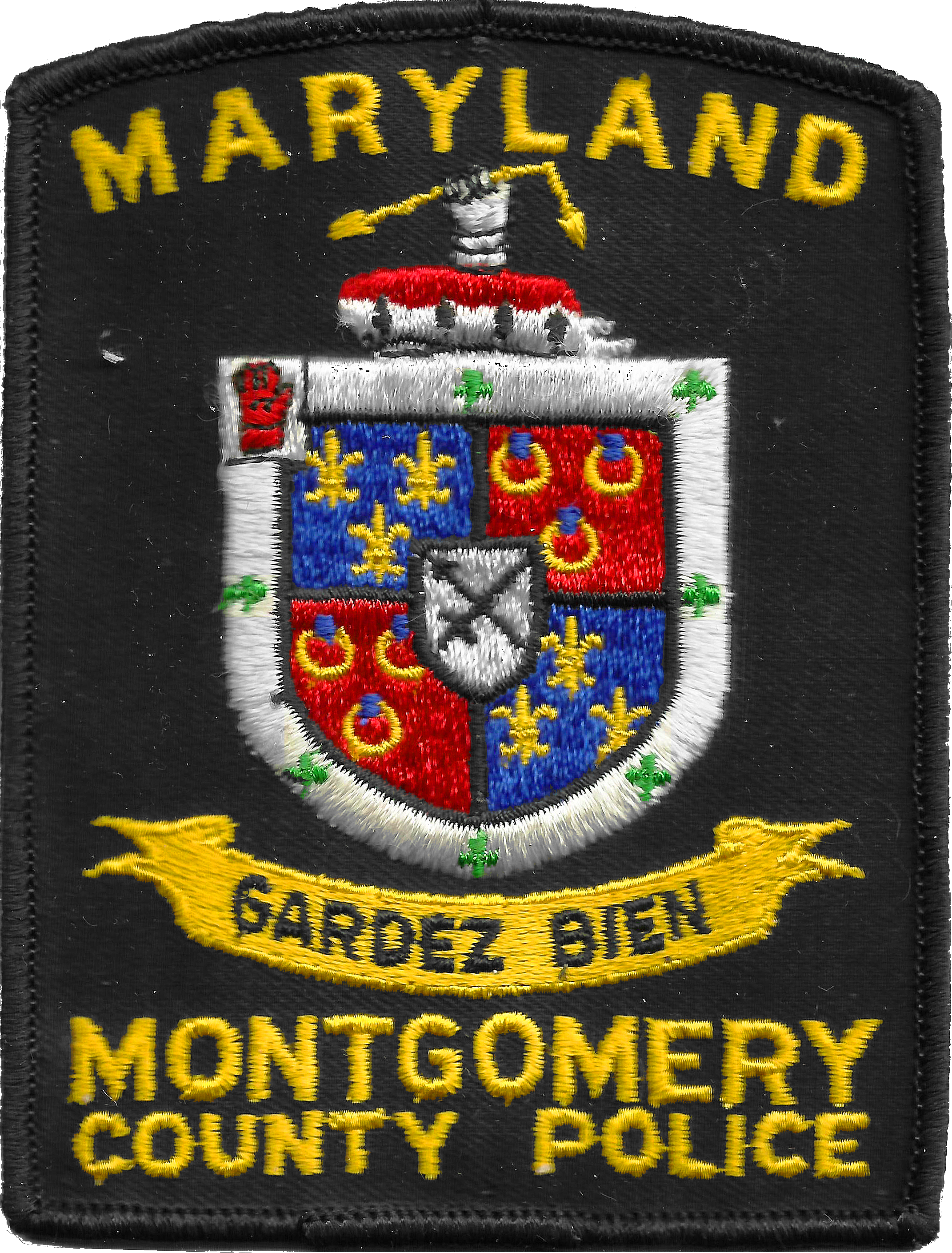
Patch of the Montgomery County Police Department (1972–1981)

Seal of Prince George's County (1696–1958)

Seal of Prince George's County (1958–1971)

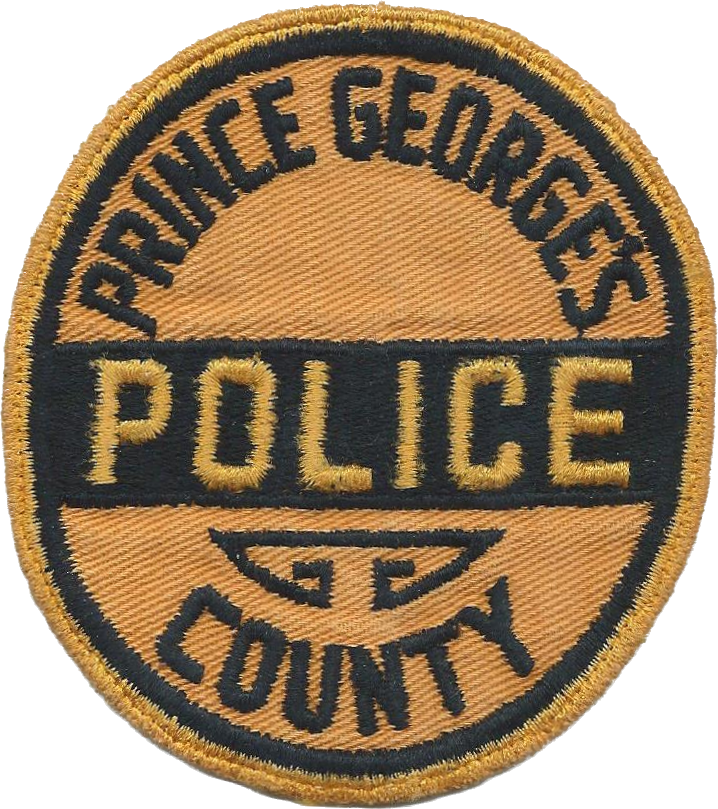
Patch of the Prince George's County Police Department (1970s)

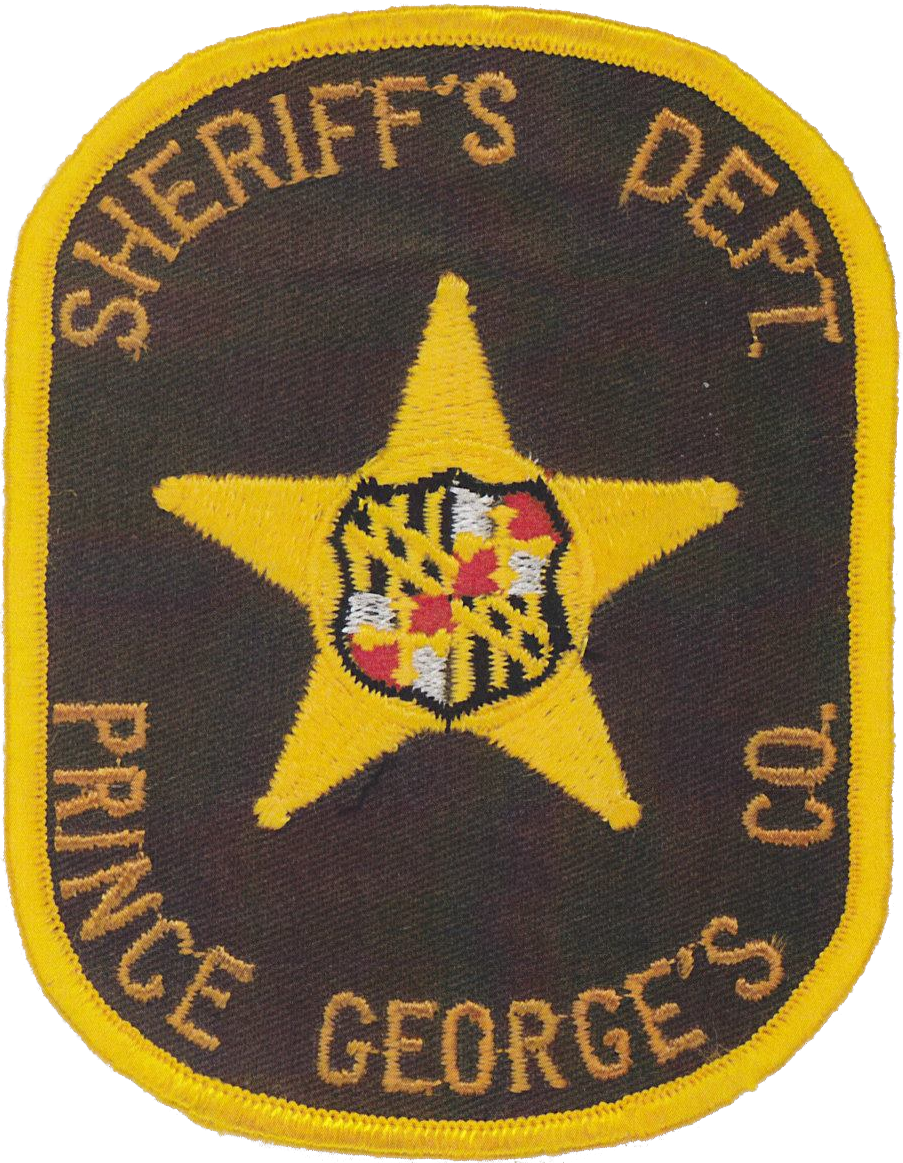
Patch of the Prince George's County Sheriff's Office (1970s)

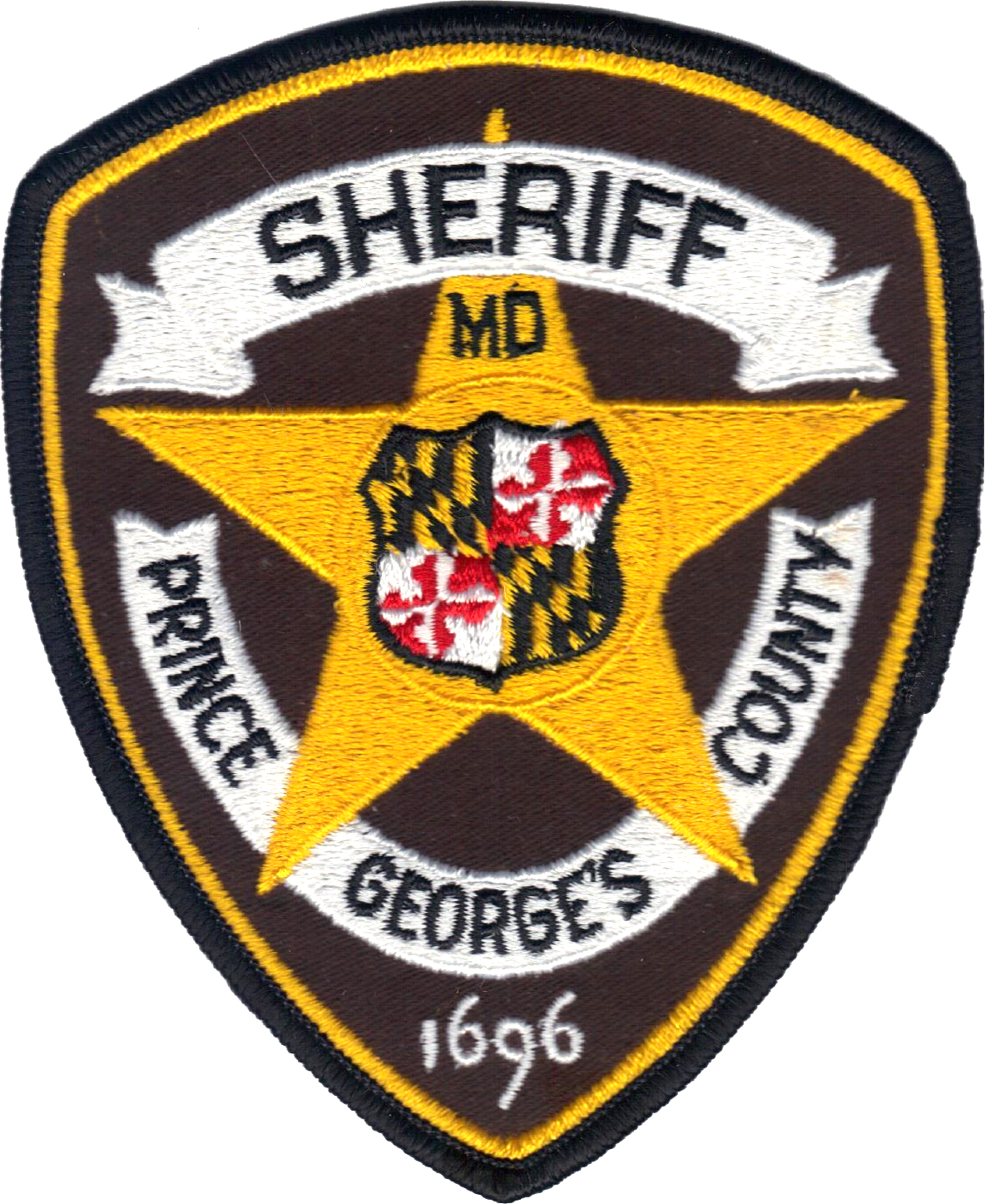
Patch of the Prince George's County Sheriff's Office (1989)

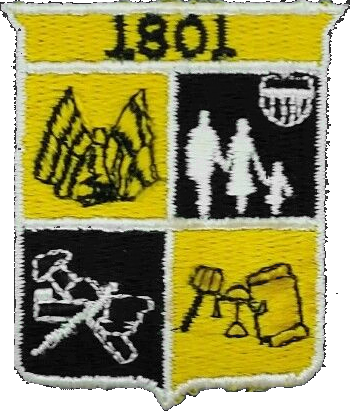
Coat of arms of the City of Rockville (discontinued in 1979)

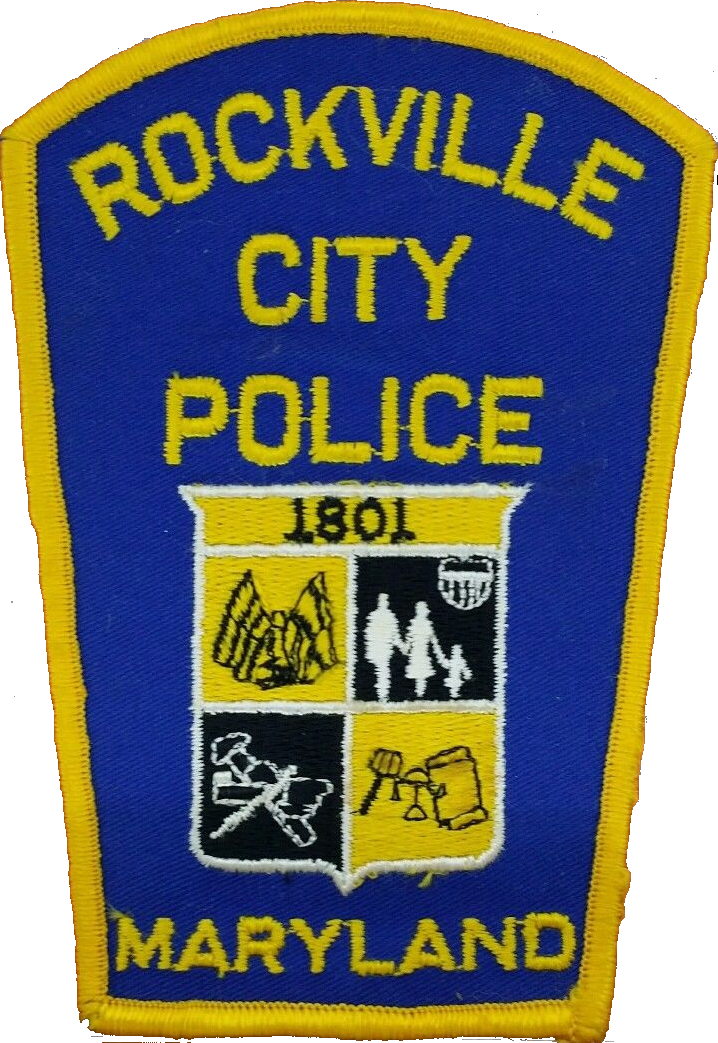
Patch of the Rockville City Police Department (1976)

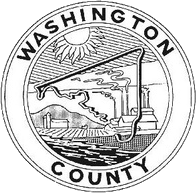
Seal of Washington County (1950–1988)

== Massachusetts ==
Seal of the City of Boston

Seal of the City of Cambridge

Seal of the City of Chicopee

Seal of the City of Gardner

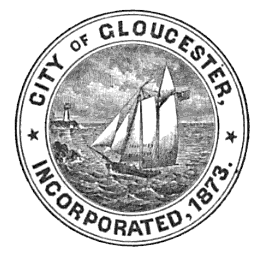
Seal of the City of Gloucester

Seal of the City of Holyoke

Seal of the City of Pittsfield

Seal of the City of Quincy

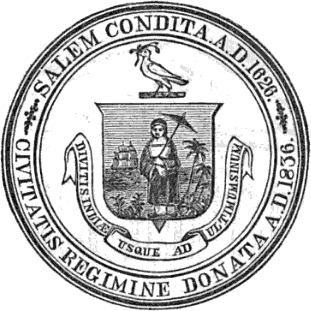
Seal of the City of Salem

Seal of the Town of South Hadley

Seal of the City of Springfield

Seal of the City of Worcester

=== Historical ===
Seal of Charlestown (1847–1874)

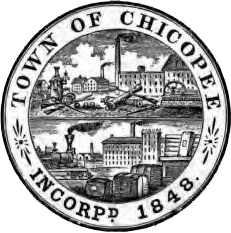
Seal of the Town of Chicopee (1848–1890)

== Michigan ==
Seal of the City of Detroit

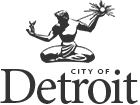
Wordmark of the City of Detroit

Seal of Leelanau County

=== Historical ===
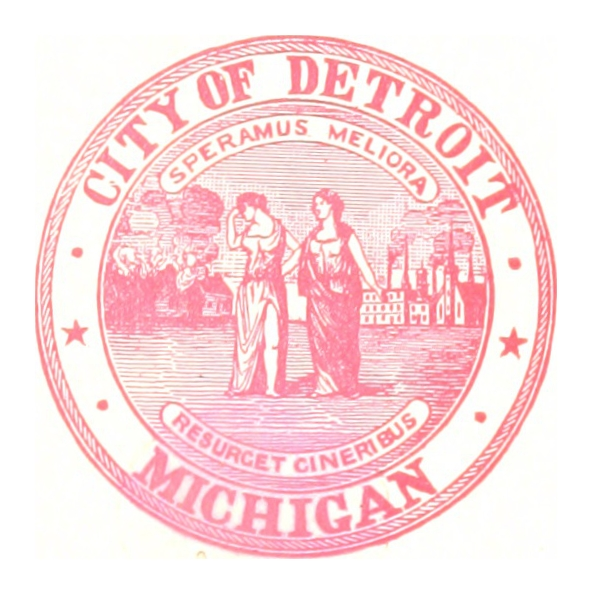
Seal of the City of Detroit (1884)

Seal of the City of Detroit (1889)

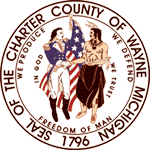
Seal of the County of Wayne (1957)

== Minnesota ==
Seal of the City of Minneapolis

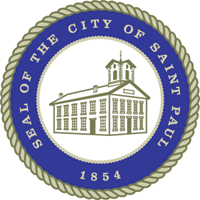
Seal of the City of Saint Paul

== Mississippi ==
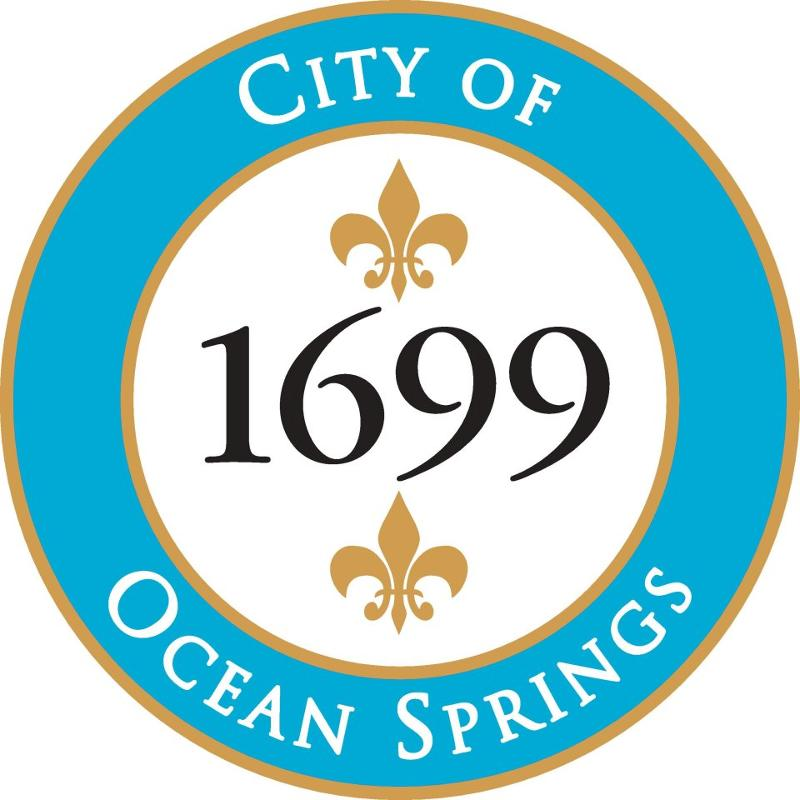
Seal of the City of Ocean Springs

Logo of the City of Brandon

== Nebraska ==
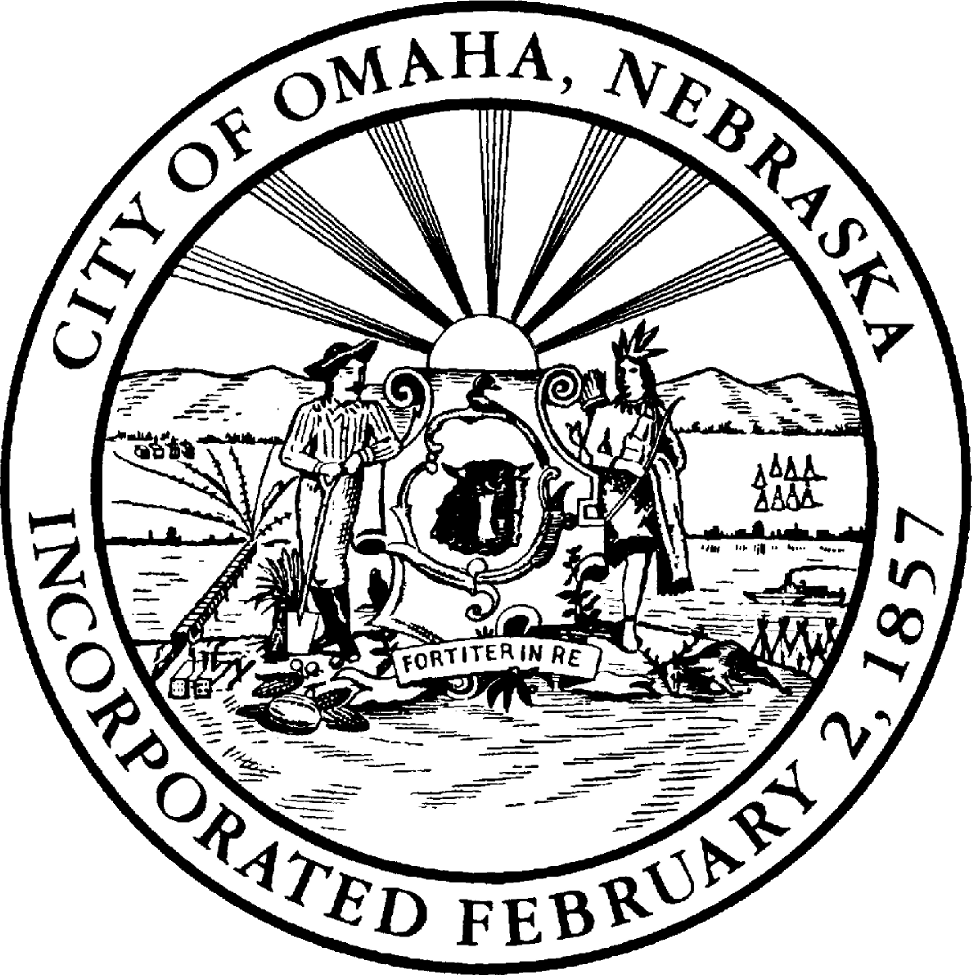
Seal of the City of Omaha

== Nevada ==
Seal of the City of Las Vegas

== New Hampshire ==
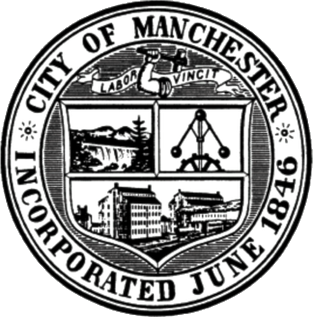
Seal of the City of Manchester

== New Jersey ==
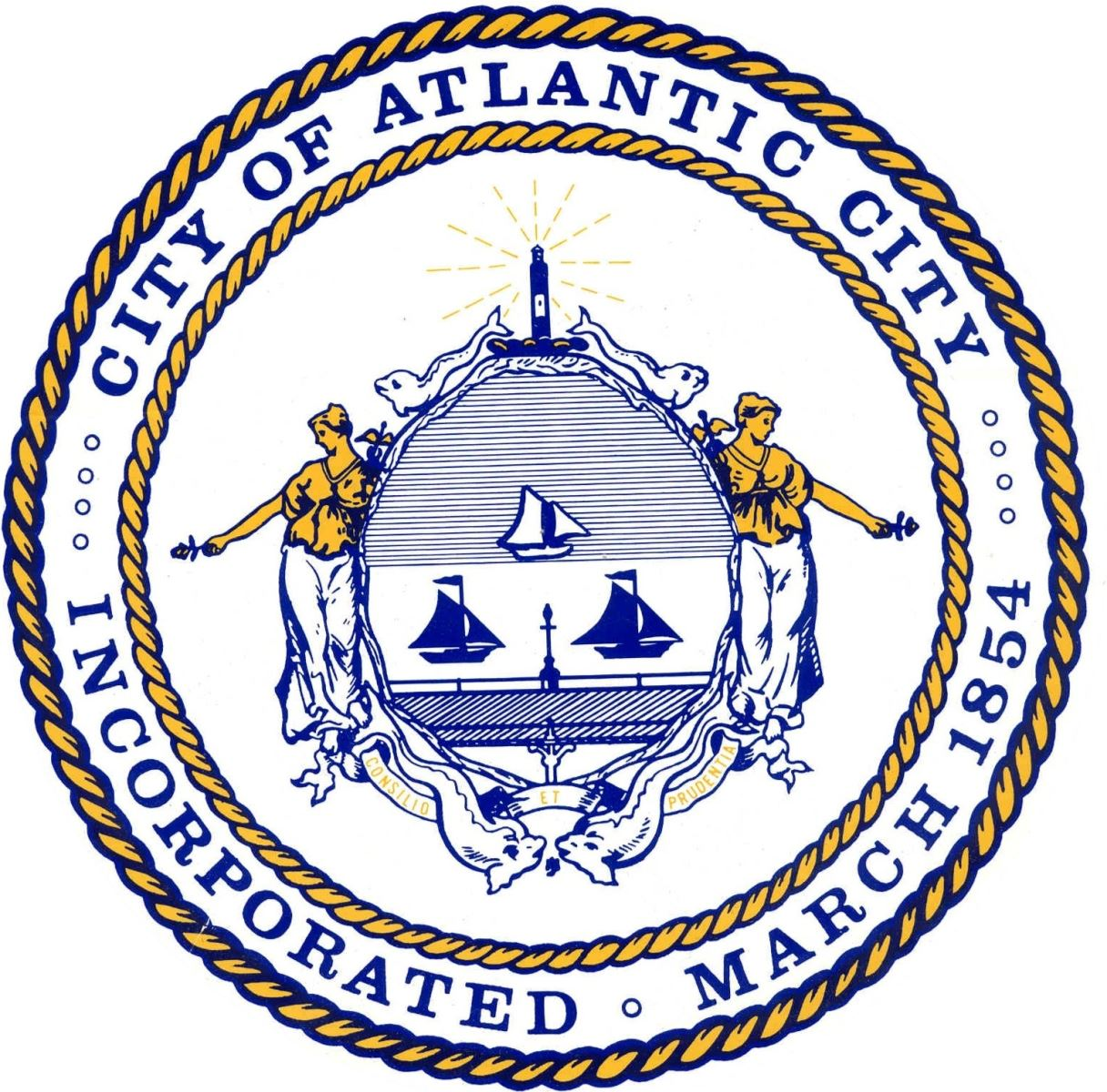
Seal of Atlantic City

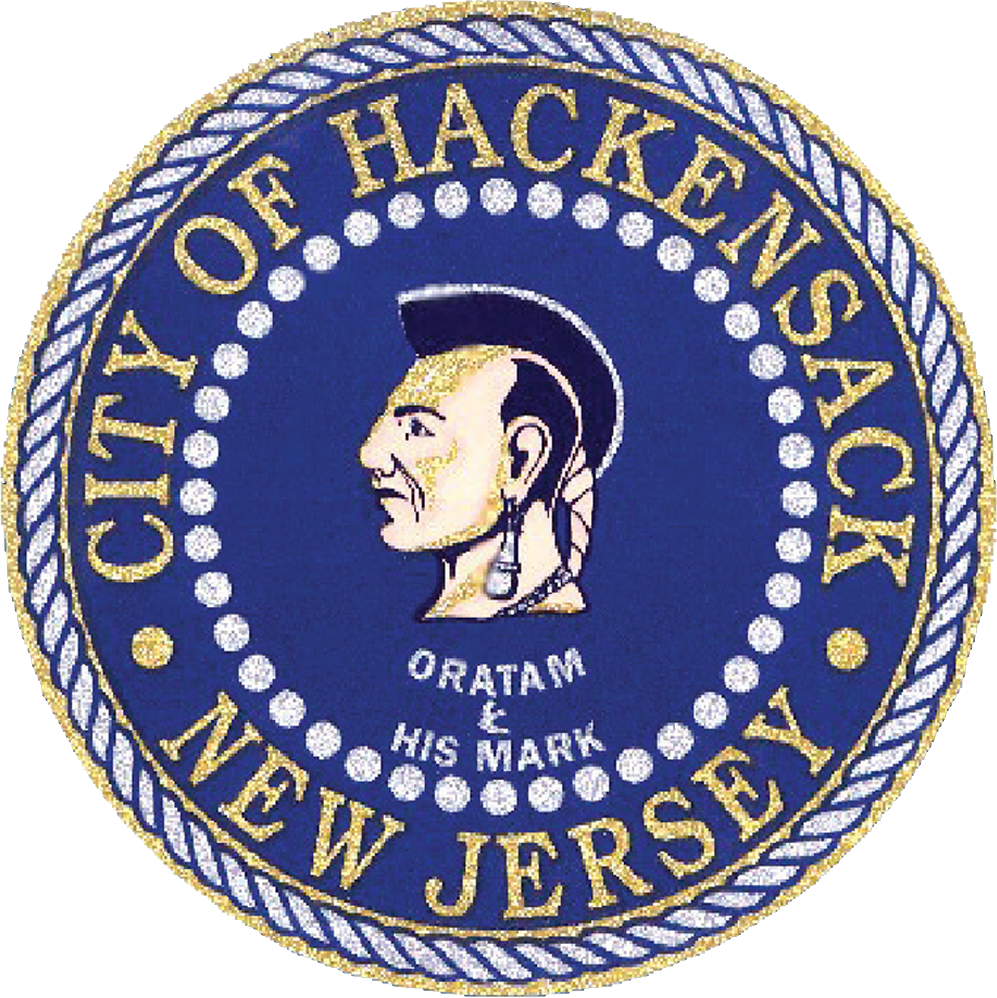
Seal of the City of Hackensack

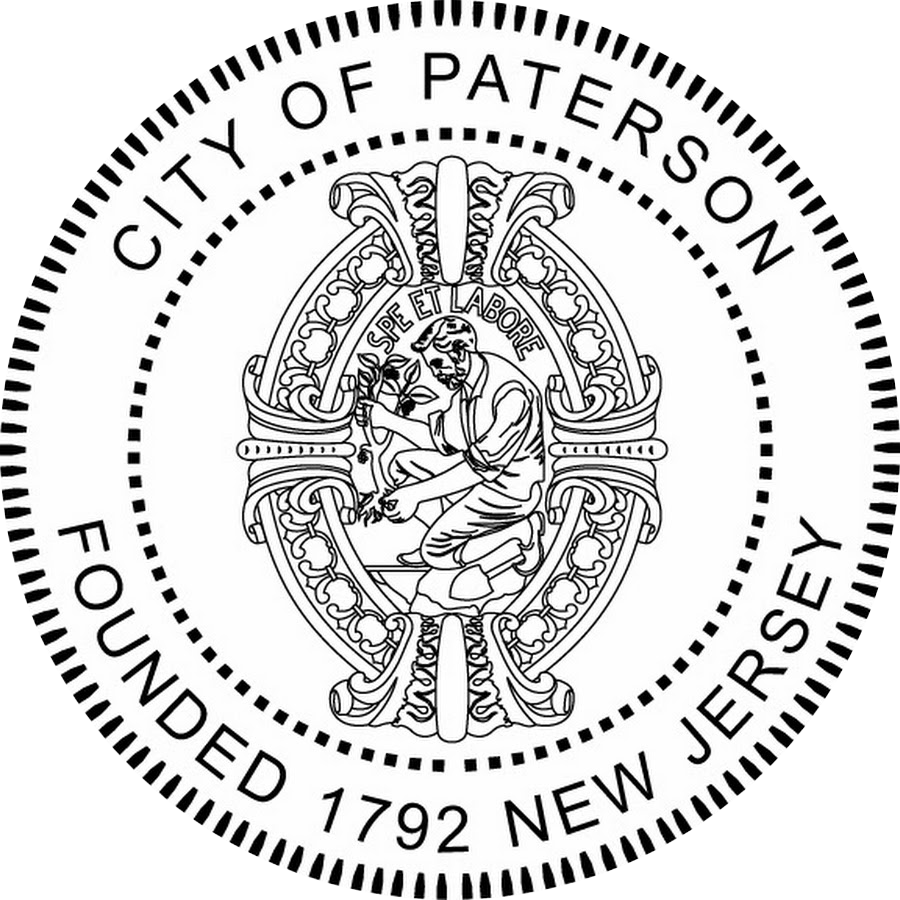
Seal of the City of the Paterson

Coat of arms of the City of the Paterson

== New York ==
Coat of arms of the City of Albany

Seal of the City of Albany

Seal of The Bronx

Seal of Brooklyn

Seal of the City of Buffalo

Seal of the Town of Colonie

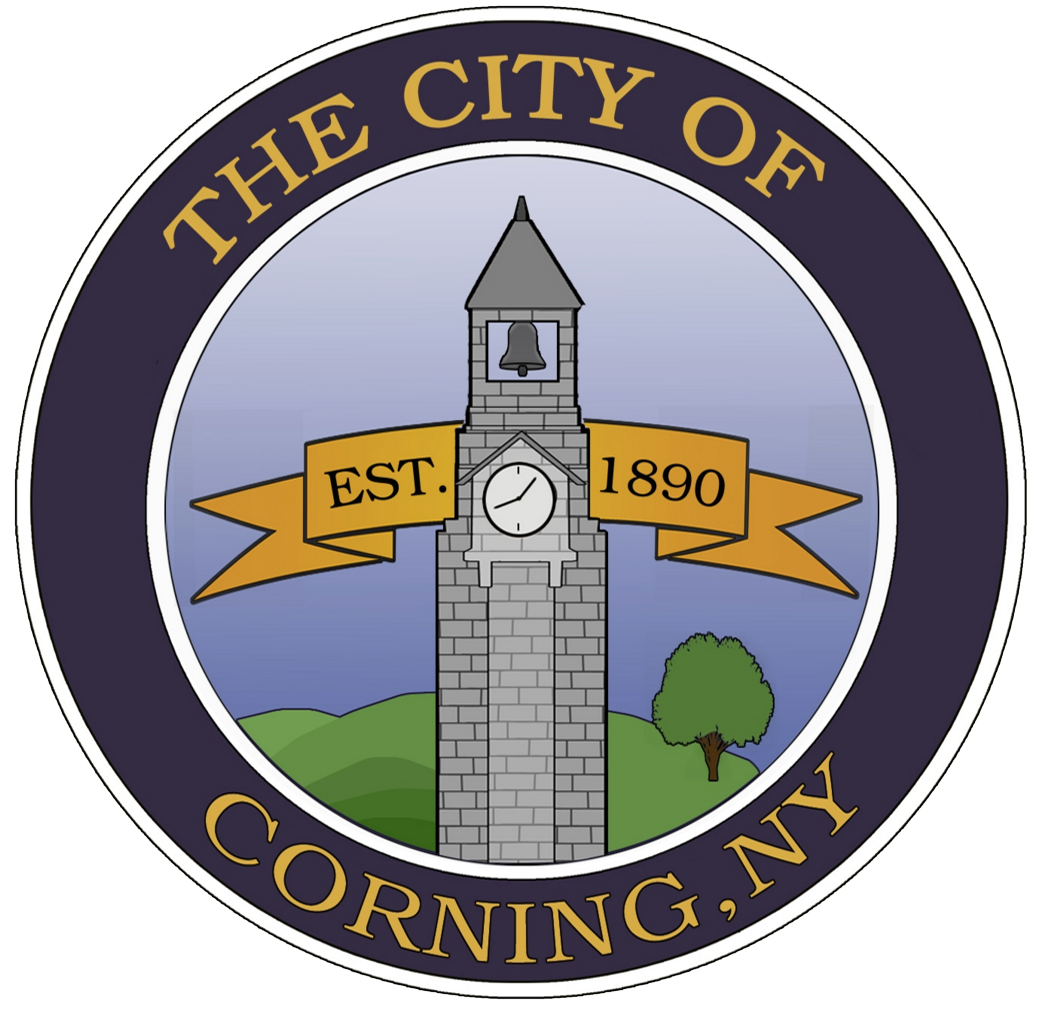
Seal of the City of Corning

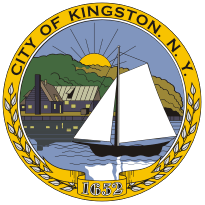
Seal of the City of Kingston

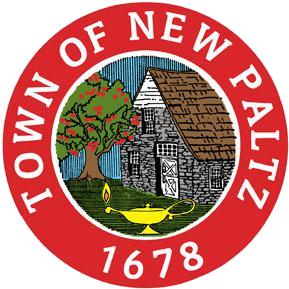
Seal of the Town of New Paltz

Seal of the City of New York

Wordmark of the City of New York

Seal of the City of Rochester

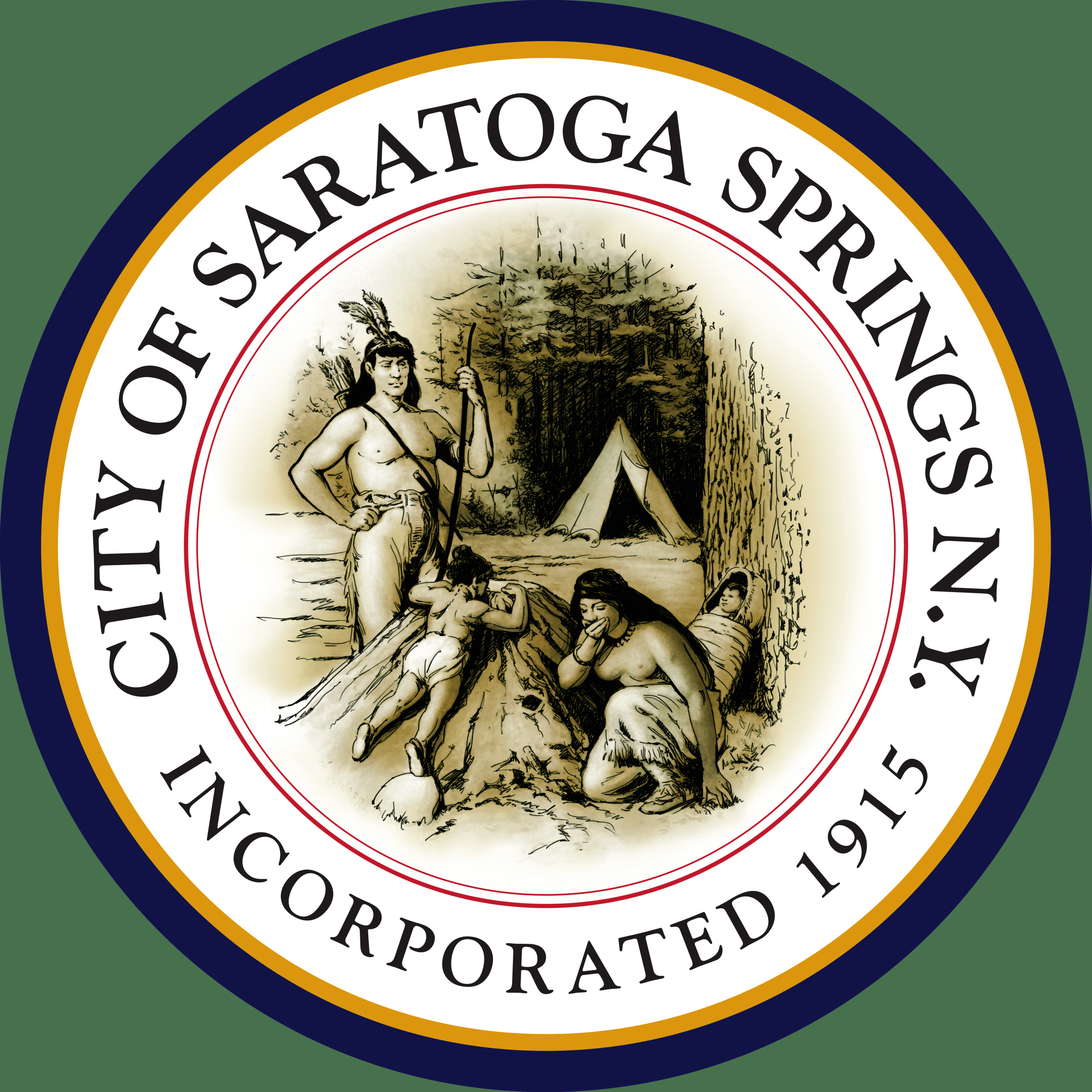
Seal of the City of Saratoga Springs

Seal of Schenectady County

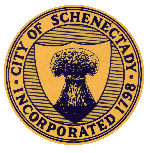
Seal of the City of Schenectady

Seal of Queens

Seal of the City of Troy

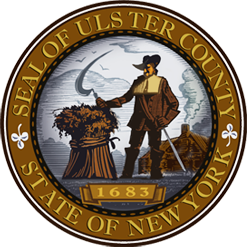
Seal of Ulster County

Seal of the City of Utica

Seal of the City of Yonkers

== North Carolina ==
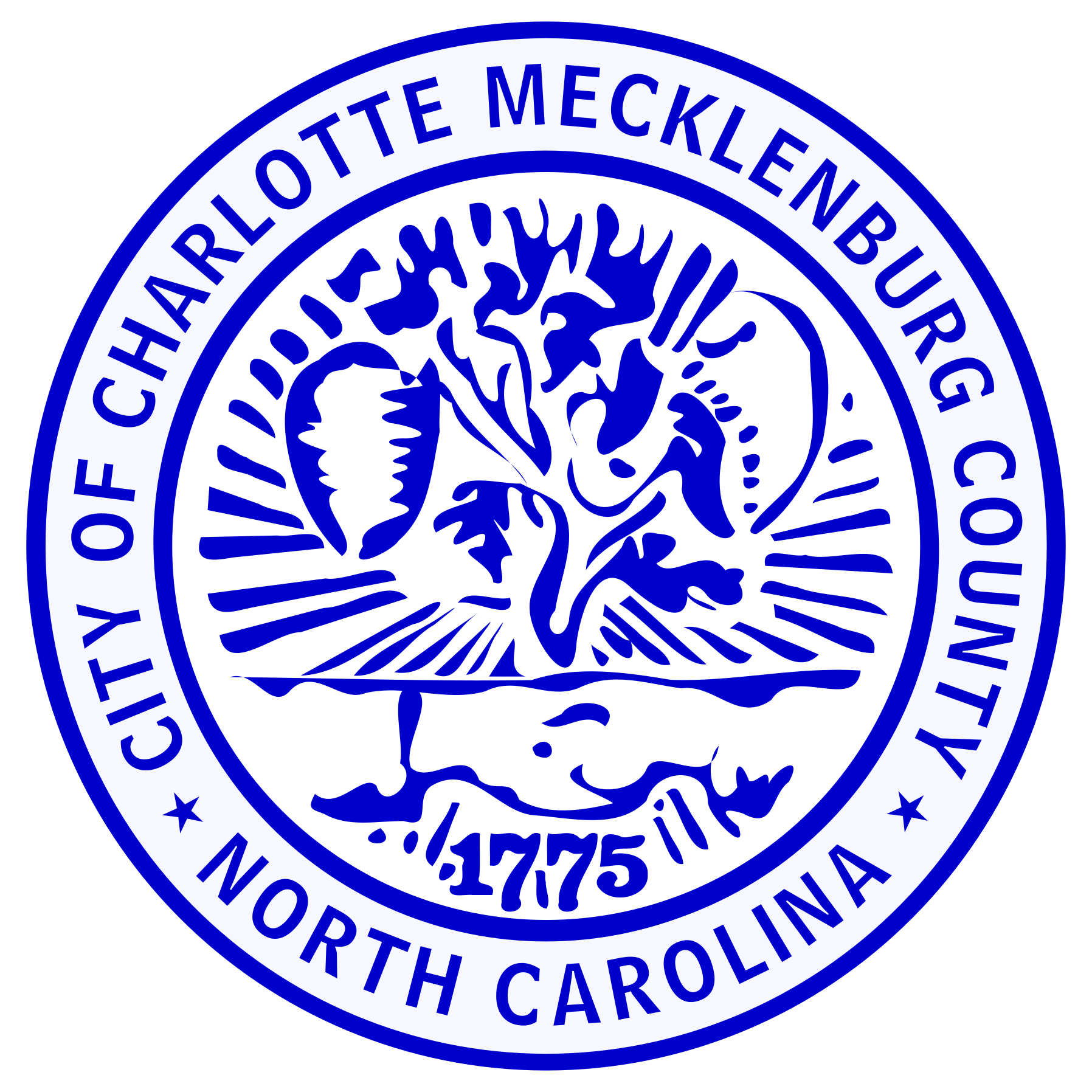
Seal of Charlotte, North Carolina

== Ohio ==
Seal of the City of Cincinnati

Seal of the City of Cleveland

Seal of the City of Columbus

Seal of Scioto County

== Oklahoma ==
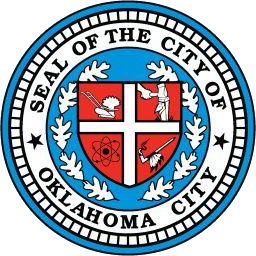
Seal of the City of Oklahoma City

Seal of the City of Tulsa

=== Historical ===
Seal of the City of Tulsa (1973–2008)

== Oregon ==
Seal of Clackamas County

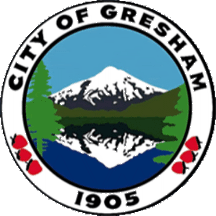
Seal of City of Gresham

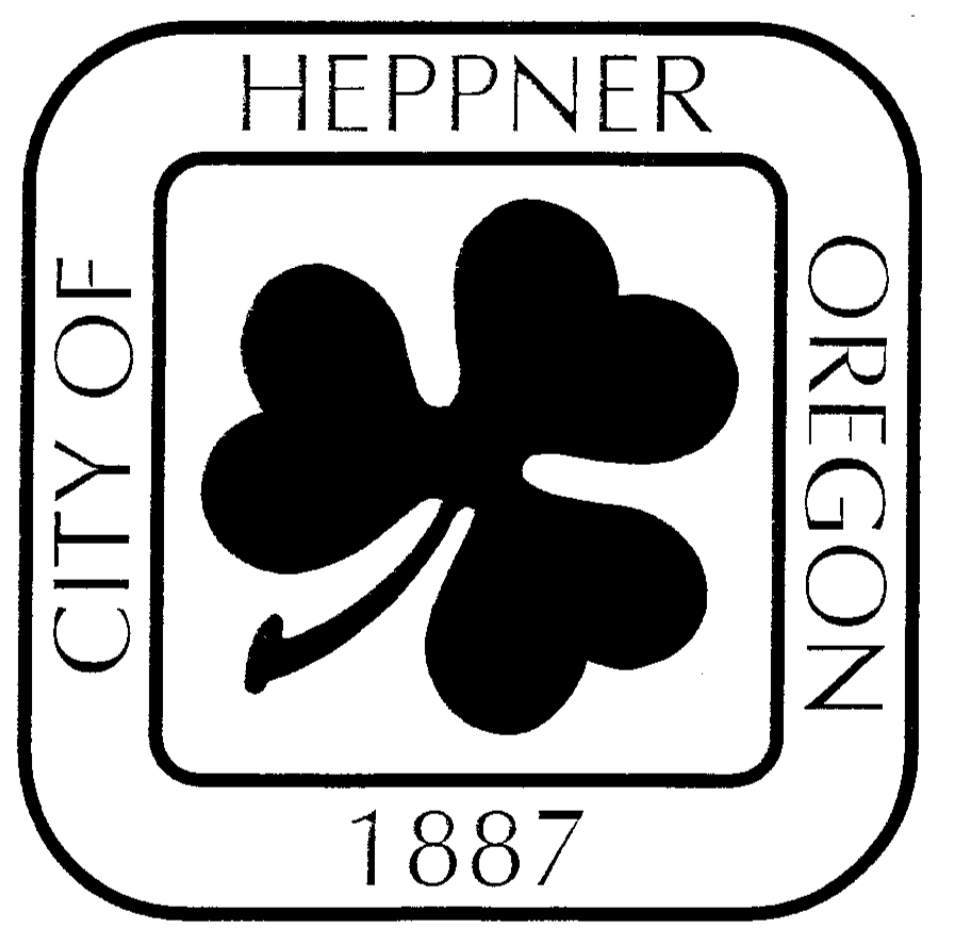
Seal of City of Heppner

Seal of City of Portland

Seal of City of Vernonia

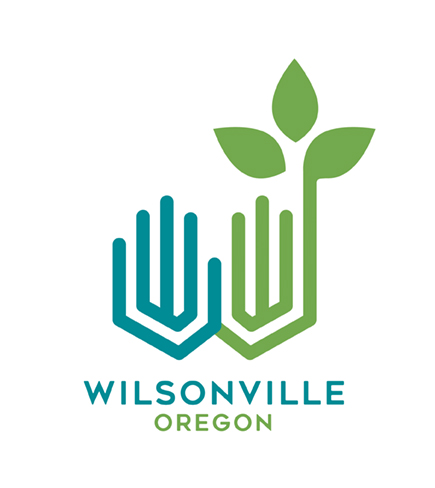
Seal of City of Wilsonville

== Pennsylvania ==
Seal of Allegheny County

Seal of the City of Erie

Seal of Erie County

Seal of the City and County of Philadelphia

Coat of arms of the City of Pittsburgh

== South Carolina ==
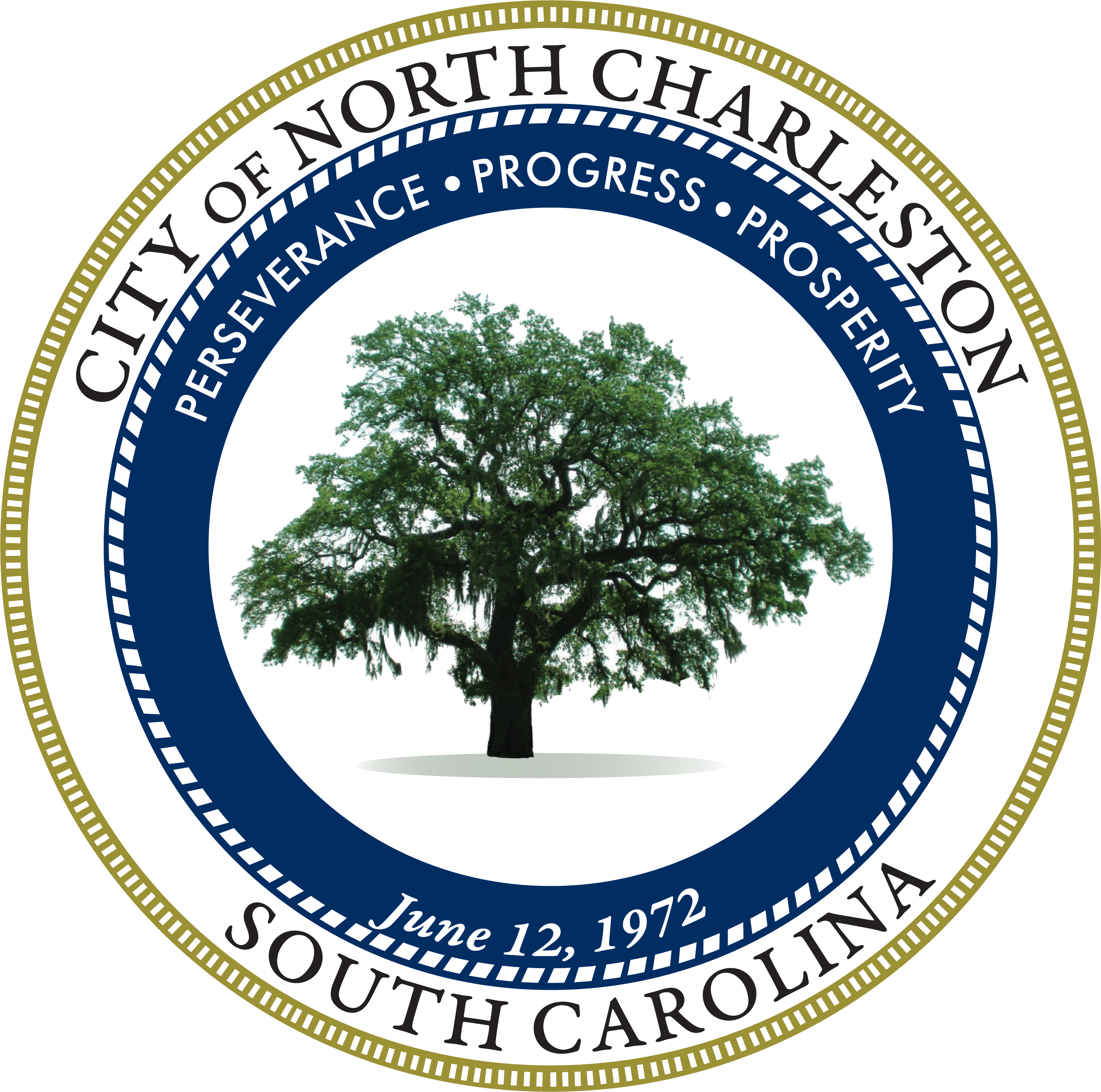
Seal of the City of North Charleston

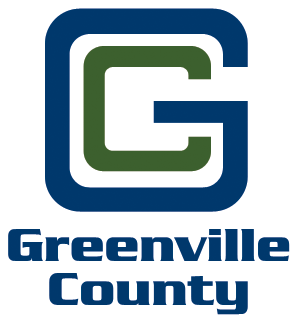
Logo of Greenwood County

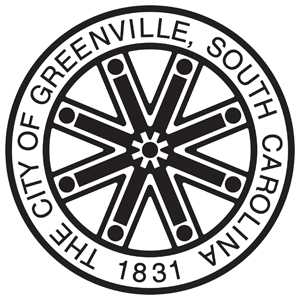
Seal of the City of Greenville

Seal of the City of Columbia

Logo of the Town of Ninety Six

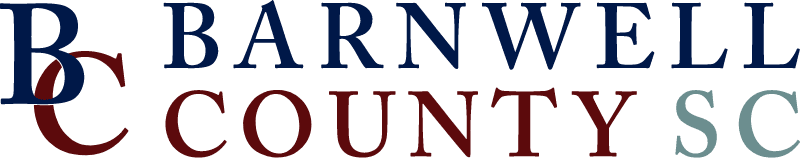
Logo of Barnwell County

=== Historical ===
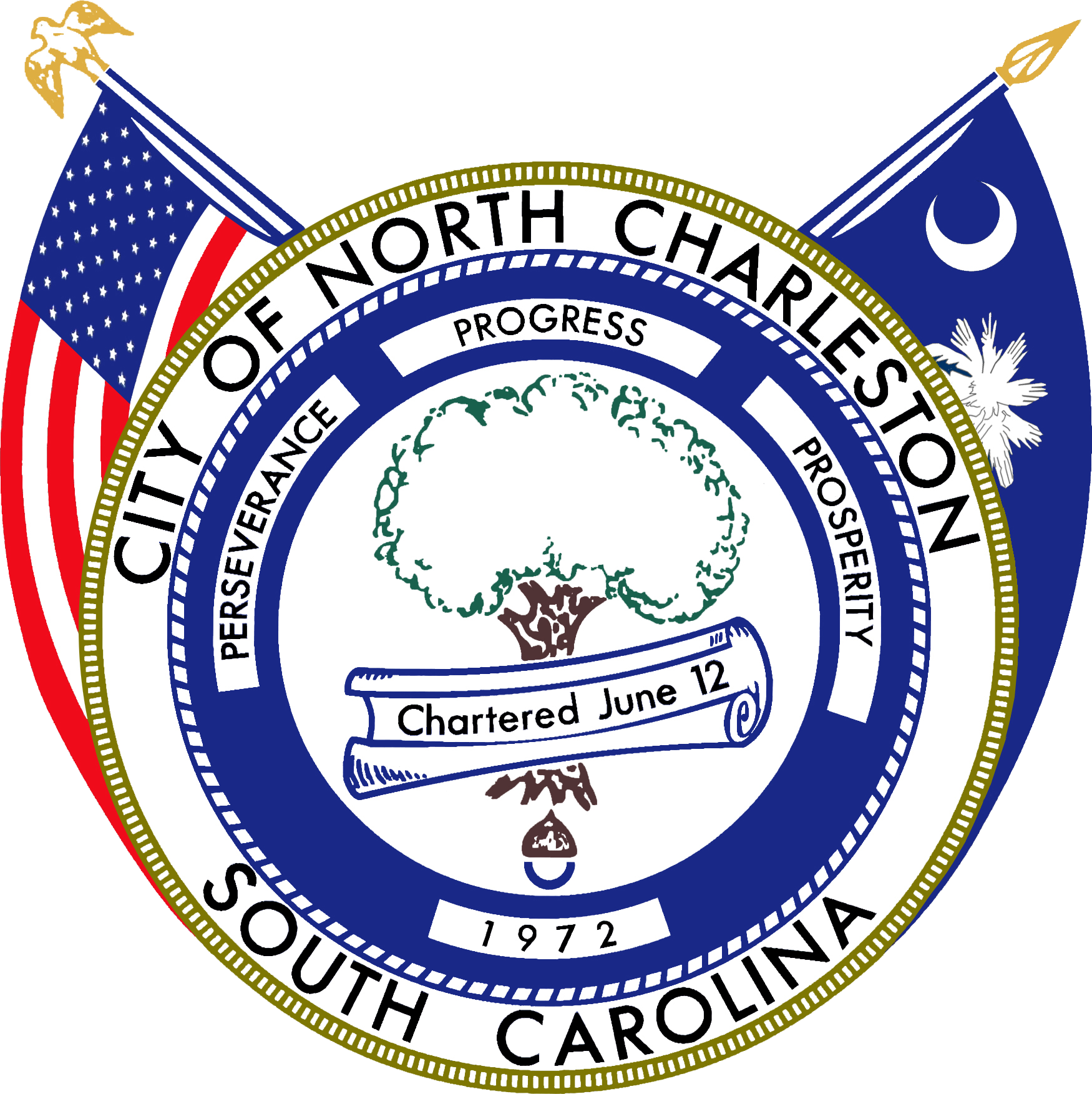
Seal of the City of North Charleston (1999–2009)

== Tennessee ==
Seal of the County of Bradley

Seal of the City of Chattanooga

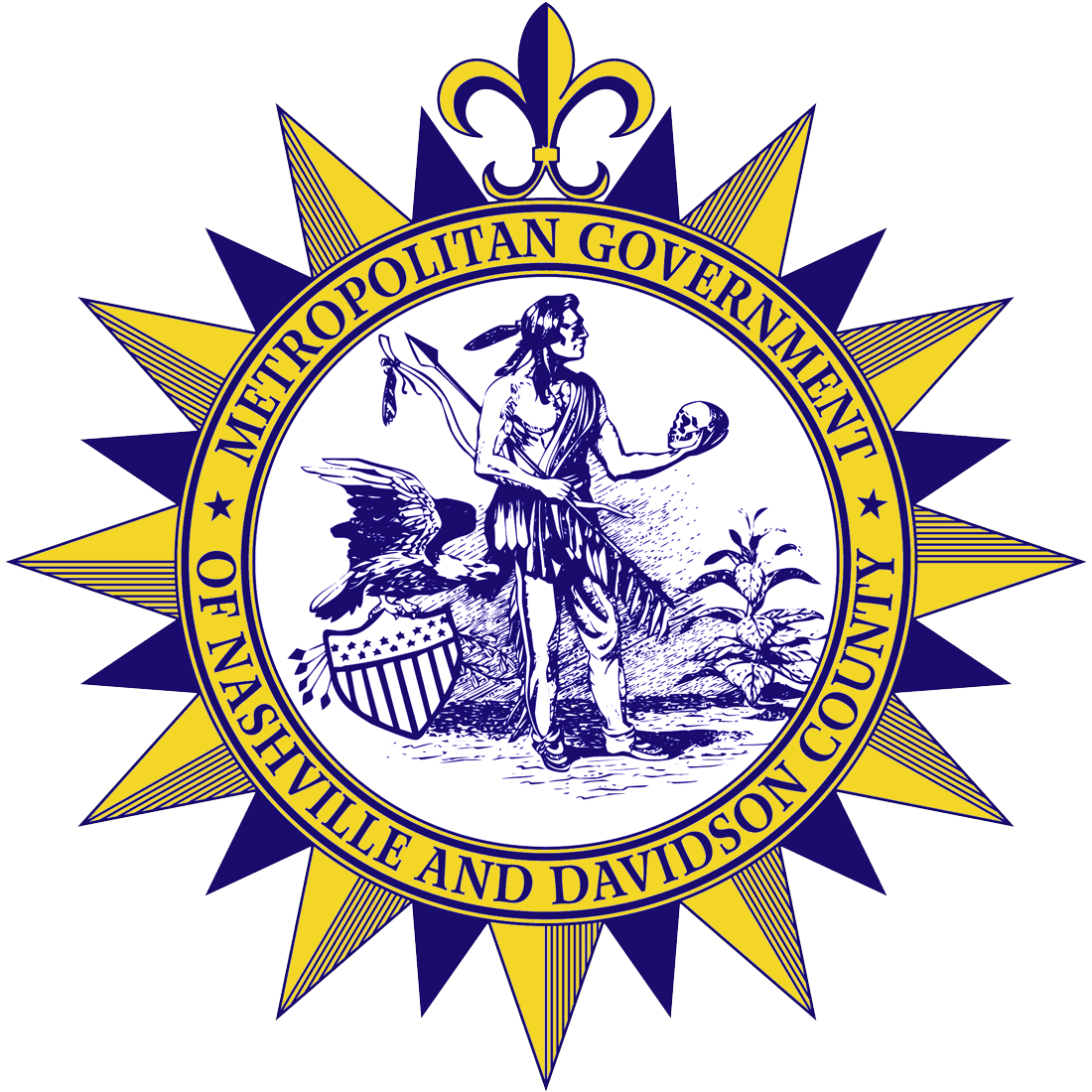
Seal of the Metropolitan Government of Nashville and Davidson County

== Texas ==
Coat of arms of the City of Austin

Coat of arms of Bexar County

Wordmark of Cameron County

Seal of the City of Dallas

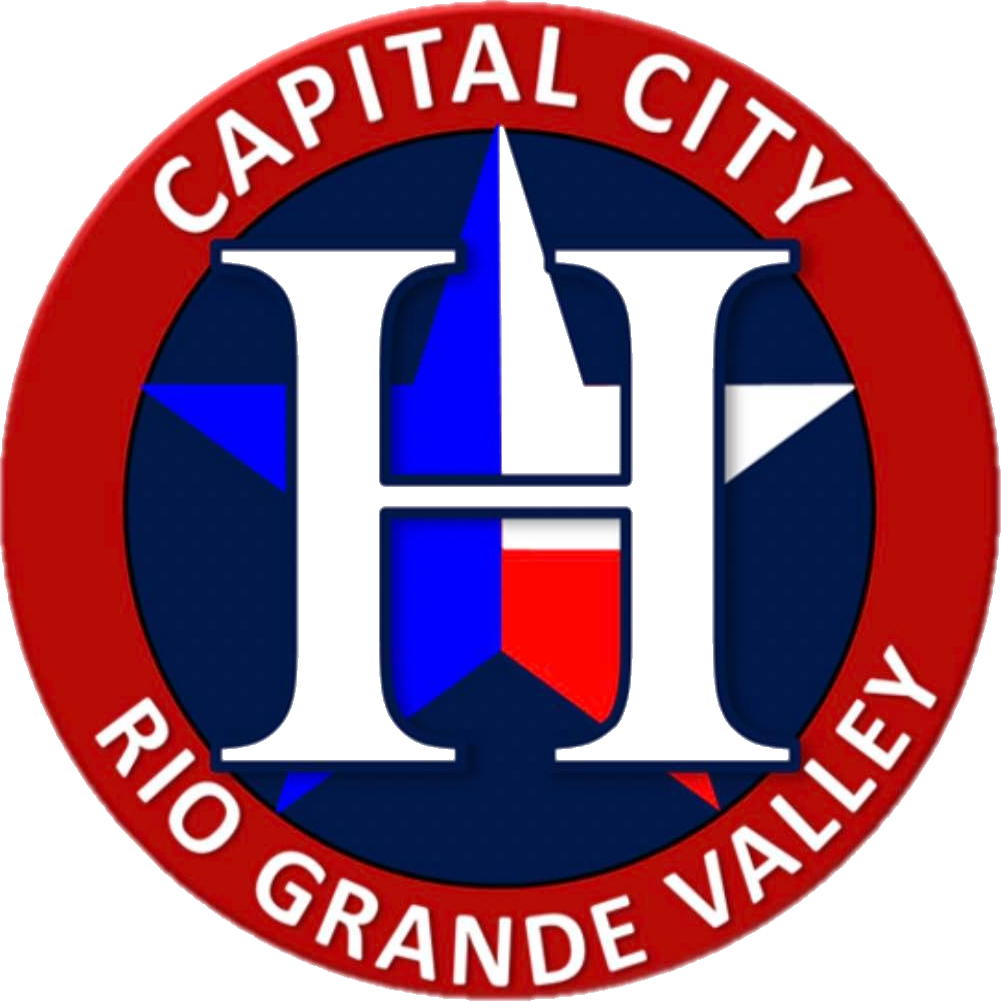
Seal of the City of Harlingen

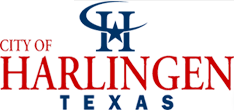
Wordmark of the City of Harlingen

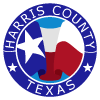
Seal of Harris County

Seal of the City of Houston

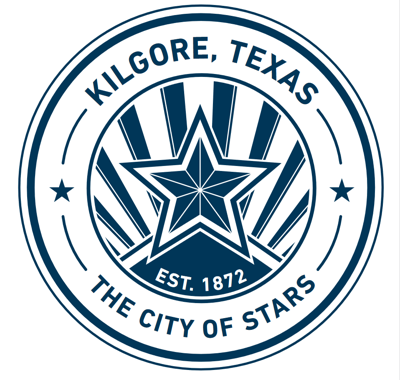
Seal of the City of Kilgore

Coat of arms of the City of San Antonio

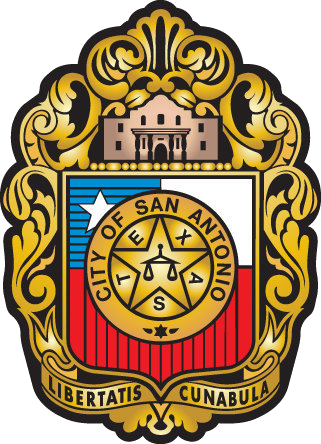
Seal of the City of San Antonio

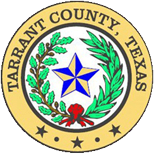
Seal of Tarrant County

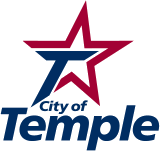
Wordmark of the City of Temple

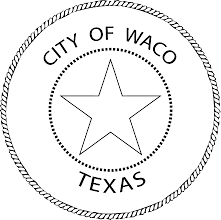
Seal of the City of Waco

== Vermont ==
Seal of the City of Burlington

== Virginia ==
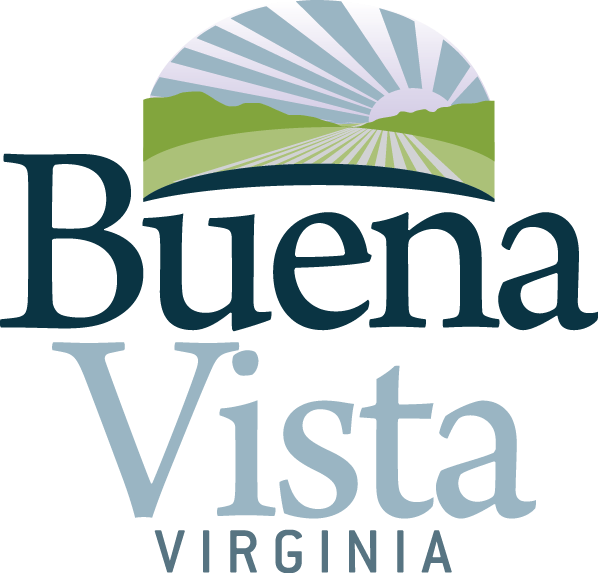
Logo of the city of Buena Vista

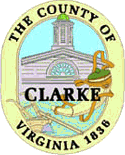
Seal of the County of Clarke

Seal of the County of Fairfax

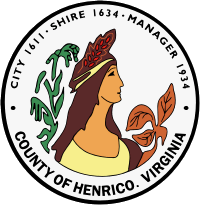
Seal of the County of Henrico

Seal of Loudoun County

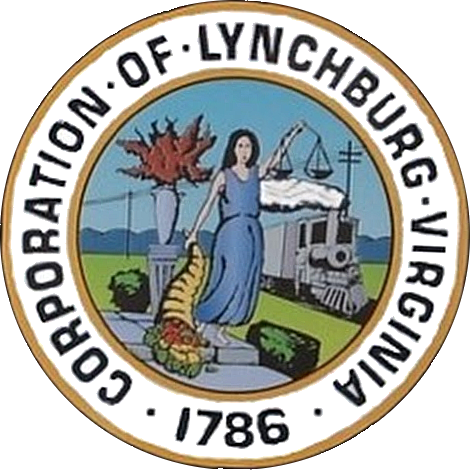
Seal of the City of Lynchburg

Logo of the City of Lynchburg

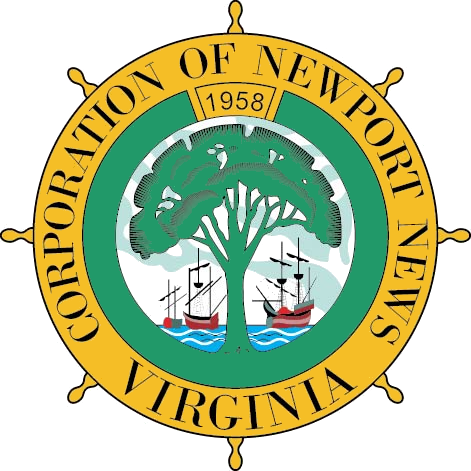
Seal of the City of Newport News

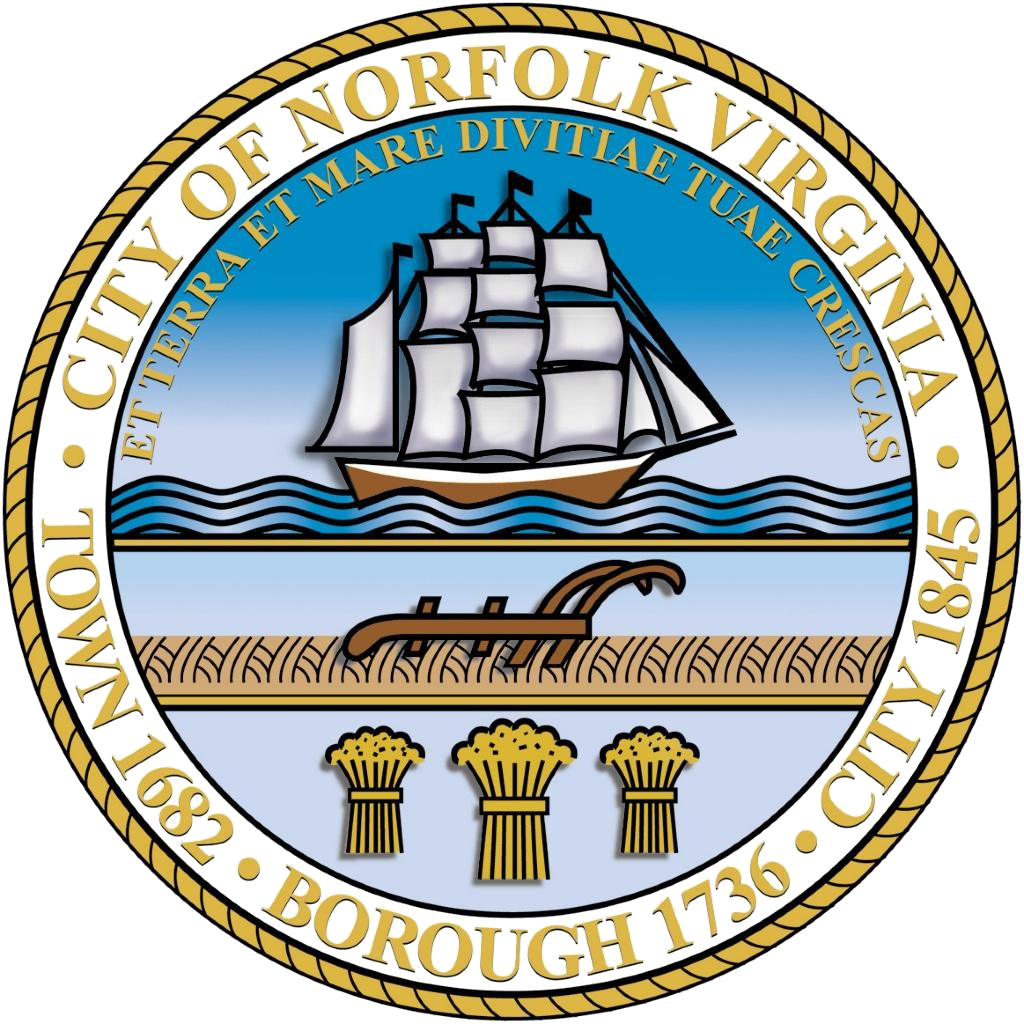
Seal of the City of Norfolk

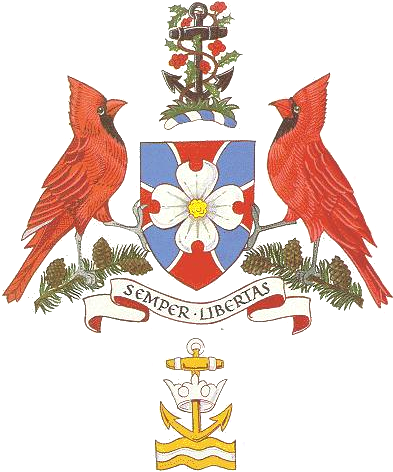
Coat of arms of Prince George County

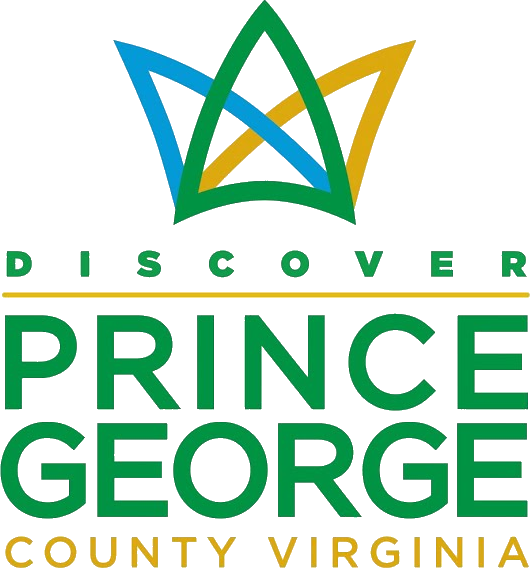
Logo of Prince George County

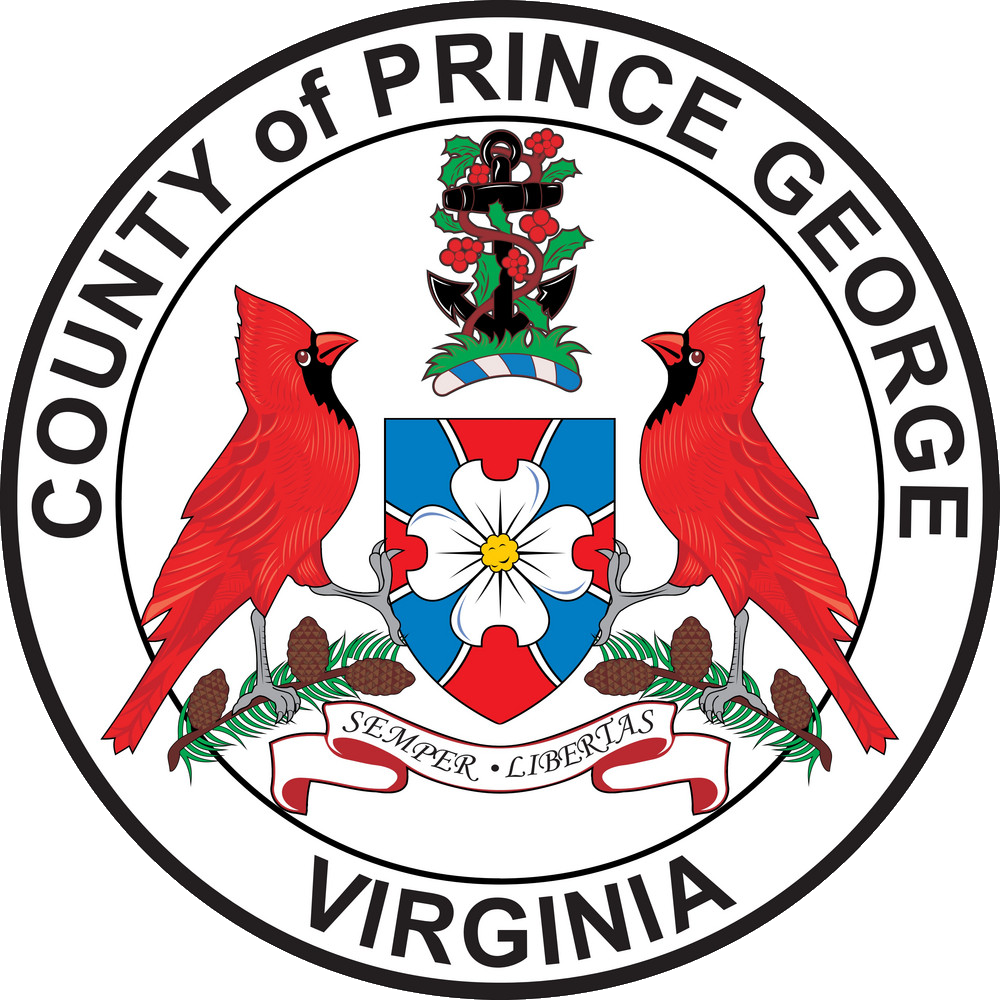
Seal of Prince George County

Seal of Prince William County

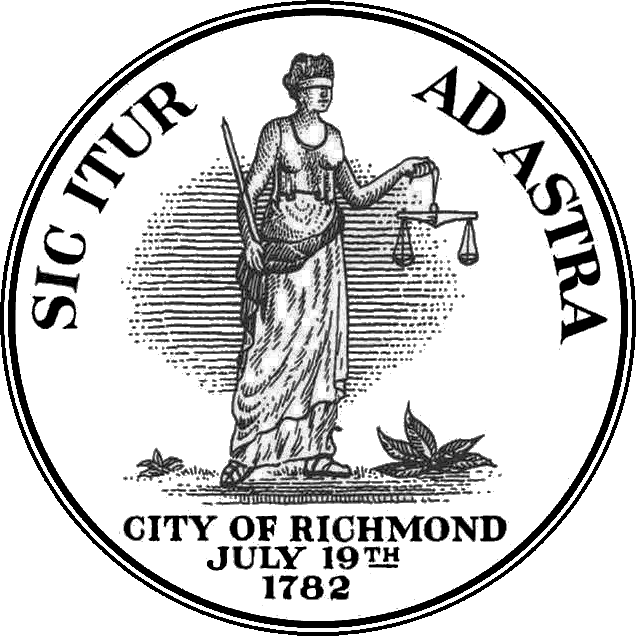
Seal of the City of Richmond

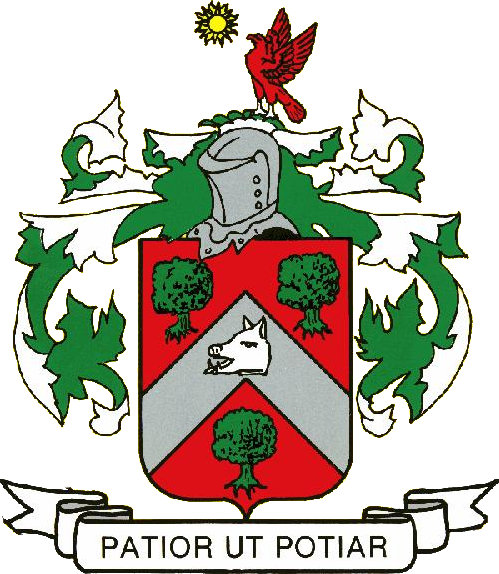
Coat of arms of the County of Spotsylvania

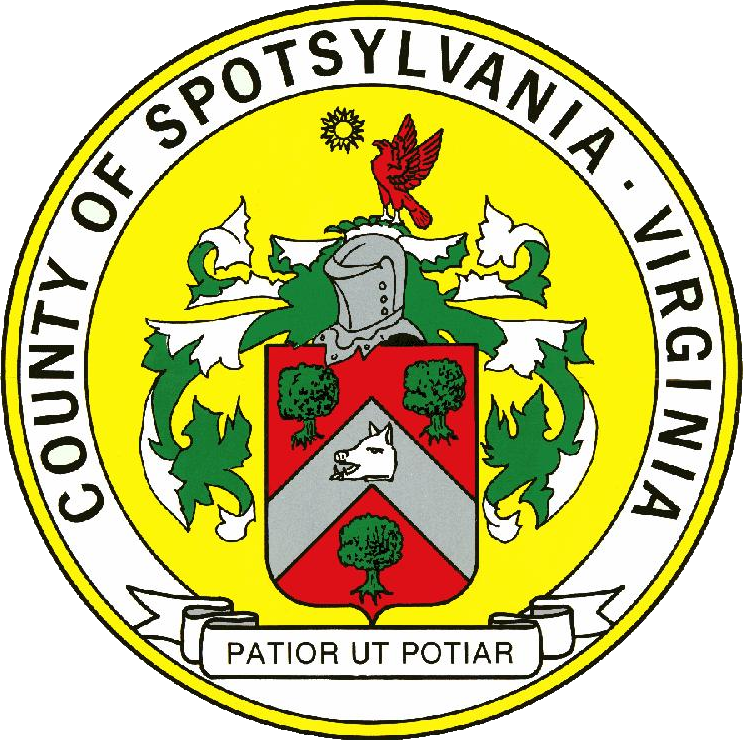
Seal of the County of Spotsylvania

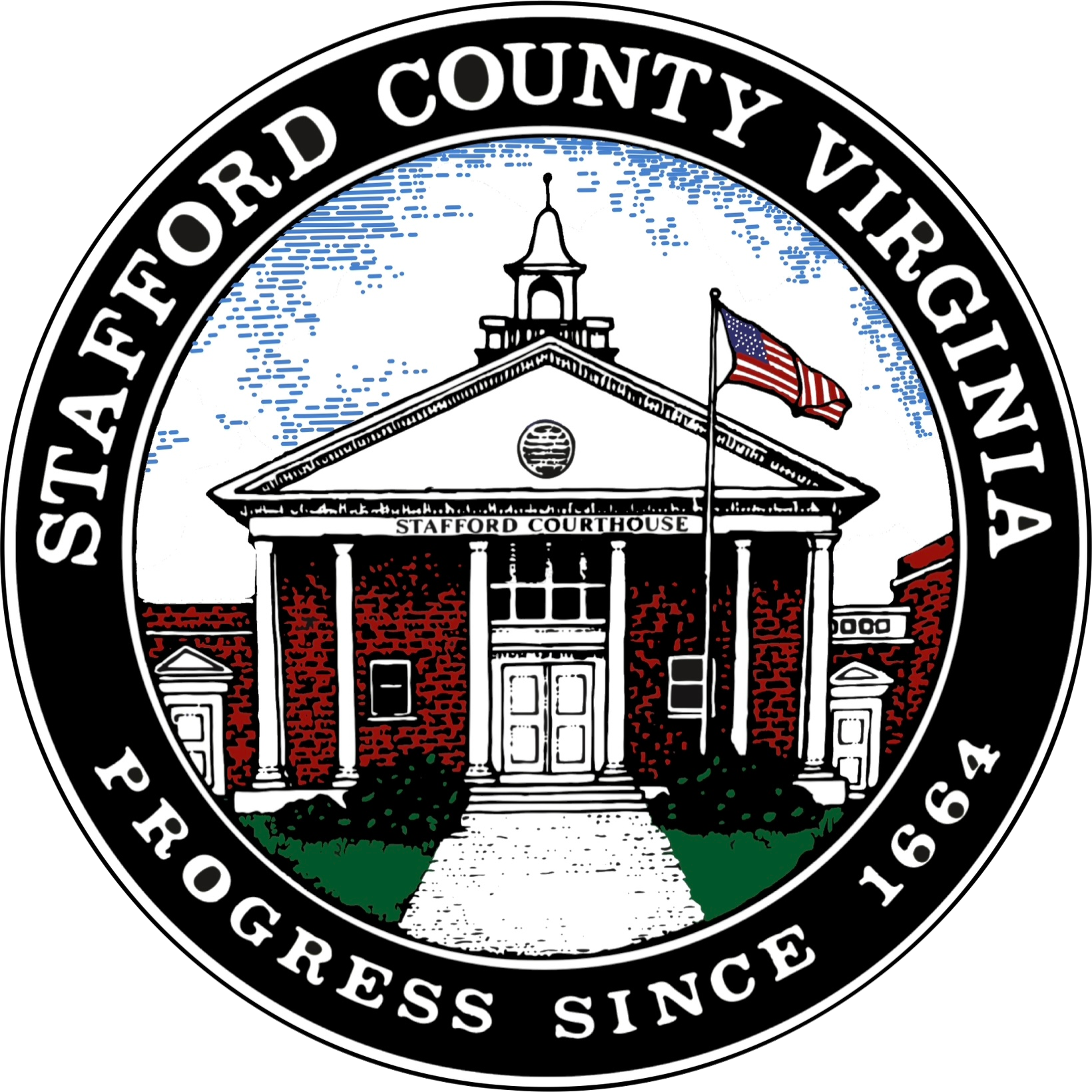
Seal of Stafford County

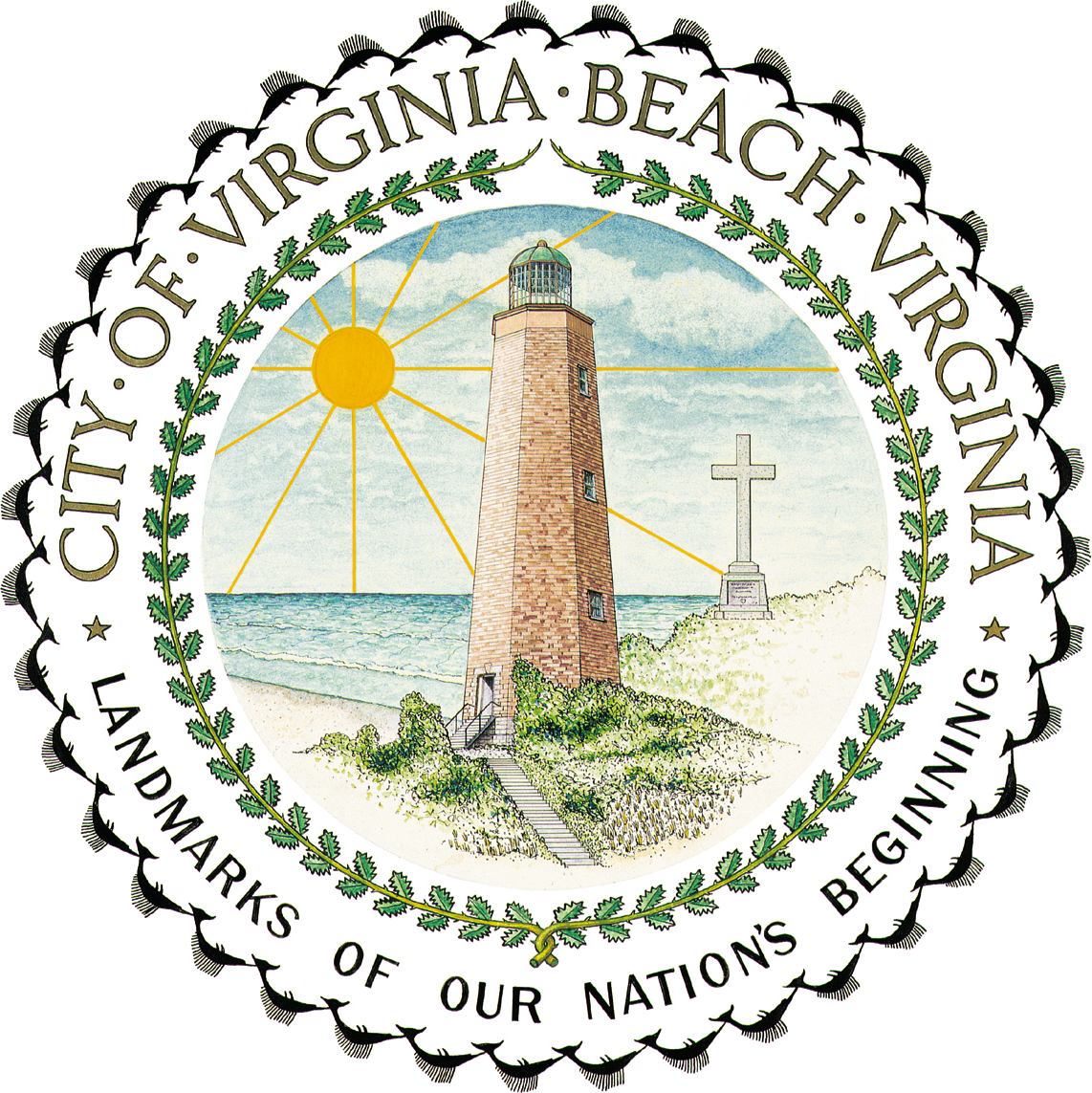
Seal of the City of Virginia Beach

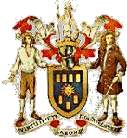
Coat of arms of the City of Williamsburg

=== Historical ===
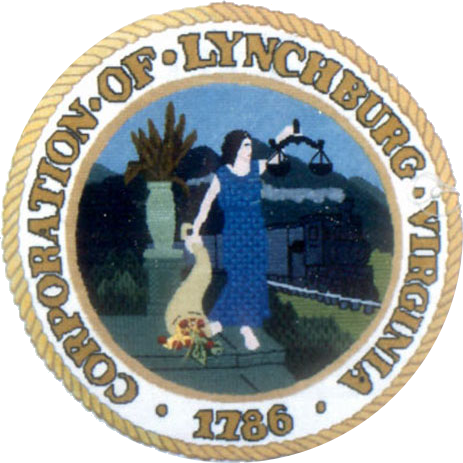
Old seal of the City of Lynchburg

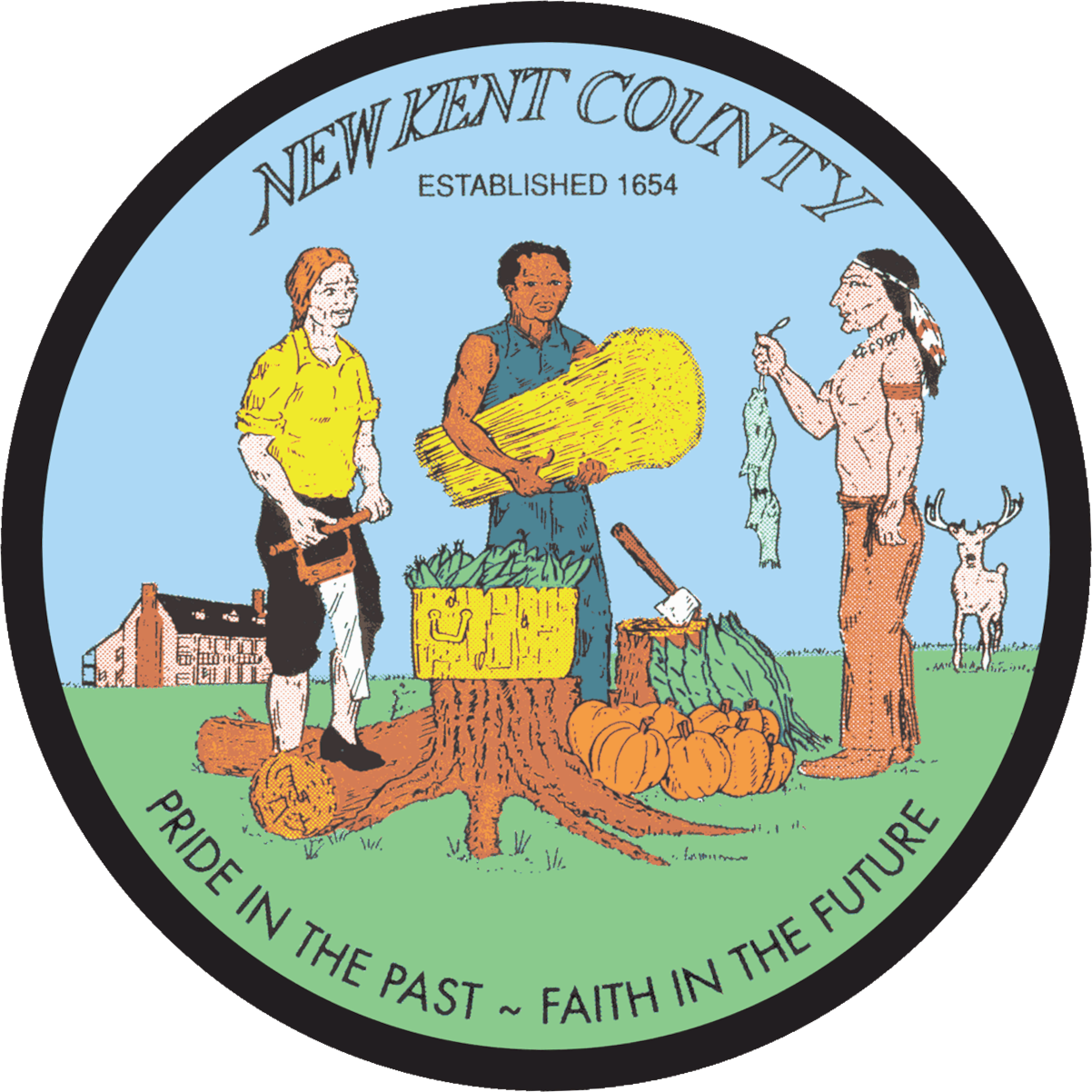
Seal of New Kent County (1978–2020)

== Washington ==
Logo of Pierce County

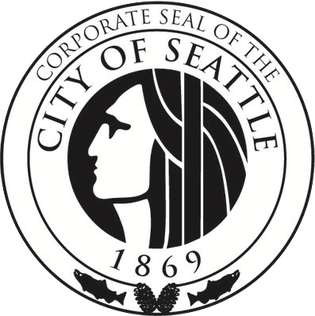
Seal of the City of Seattle

Seal of Snohomish County

=== Historical ===
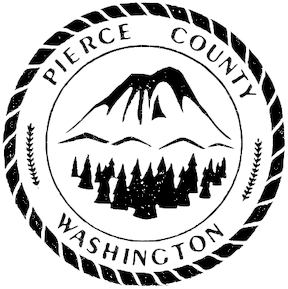
Seal of Pierce County (1981–2019)

== West Virginia ==
Coat of arms of the City of Morgantown

Seal of the City of Morgantown

=== Historical ===
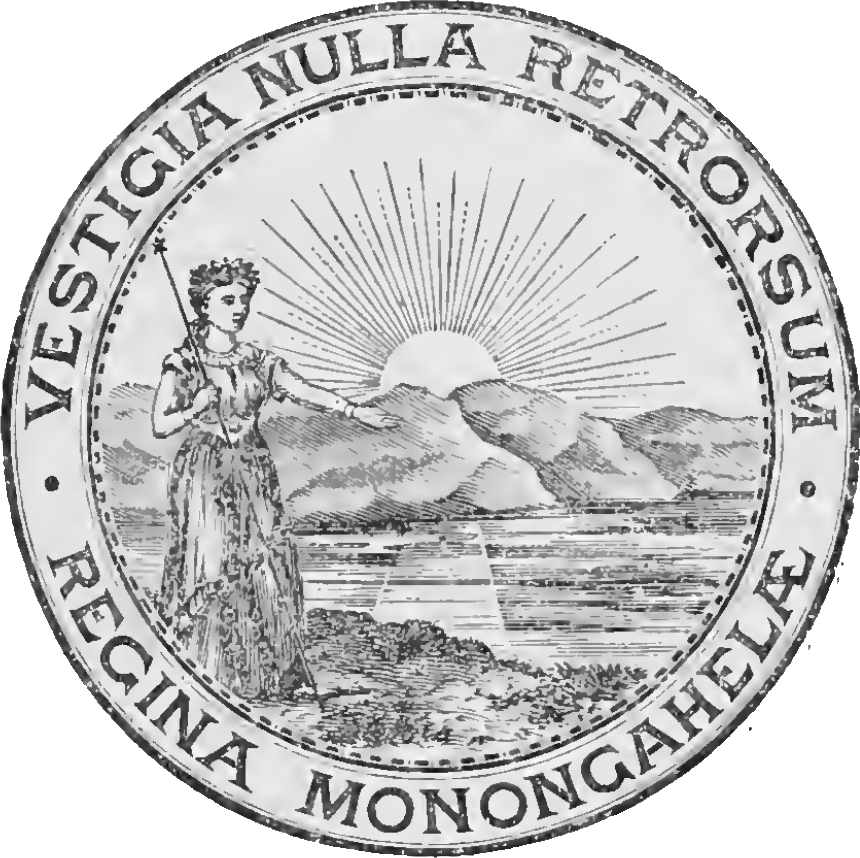
Seal of the City of Morgantown (1885–2023)

== See also ==
- Flags of the U.S. states
- History of the flags of the United States
- Historical coats of arms of the U.S. states from 1876
- List of U.S. state, district, and territorial insignia – a list of state flags, seals and coats of arms
- Seals of governors of the U.S. states
- Flags of governors of the U.S. states
- United States heraldry
