= Government of Los Angeles =

Municipal government in California, US

Government of the City of Los Angeles
- Seal of Los Angeles
- Formation: April 4, 1850; 176 years ago
- City charter: Los Angeles City Charter
- Website: lacity.gov

City-wide elected officials
- Attorney: Los Angeles City Attorney
- Comptroller: Los Angeles City Controller

Legislative branch
- Legislature: Los Angeles City Council
- Meeting place: Los Angeles City Hall

Executive branch
- Mayor: Mayor of Los Angeles
- Appointed by: Election

The government of the City of Los Angeles operates as a charter city (as opposed to a general law city) under the charter of the City of Los Angeles. The elected government is composed of the Los Angeles City Council with 15 city council districts and the mayor of Los Angeles, which operate under a mayor–council government, as well as several other elective offices. Under the California Constitution, all judicial, school, county, and city offices, including those of chartered cities, are nonpartisan. The current mayor is Karen Bass, the current city attorney is Hydee Feldstein Soto and the current city controller is Kenneth Mejia.

In addition, there are numerous departments and appointed officers such as the Los Angeles Police Department (LAPD), the Los Angeles Fire Department (LAFD), the Los Angeles Department of Transportation (LADOT), the Los Angeles Public Library (LAPL), the Los Angeles Department of Public Works (LADPW), and the Los Angeles Department of Water and Power (LADWP).

== Organization ==
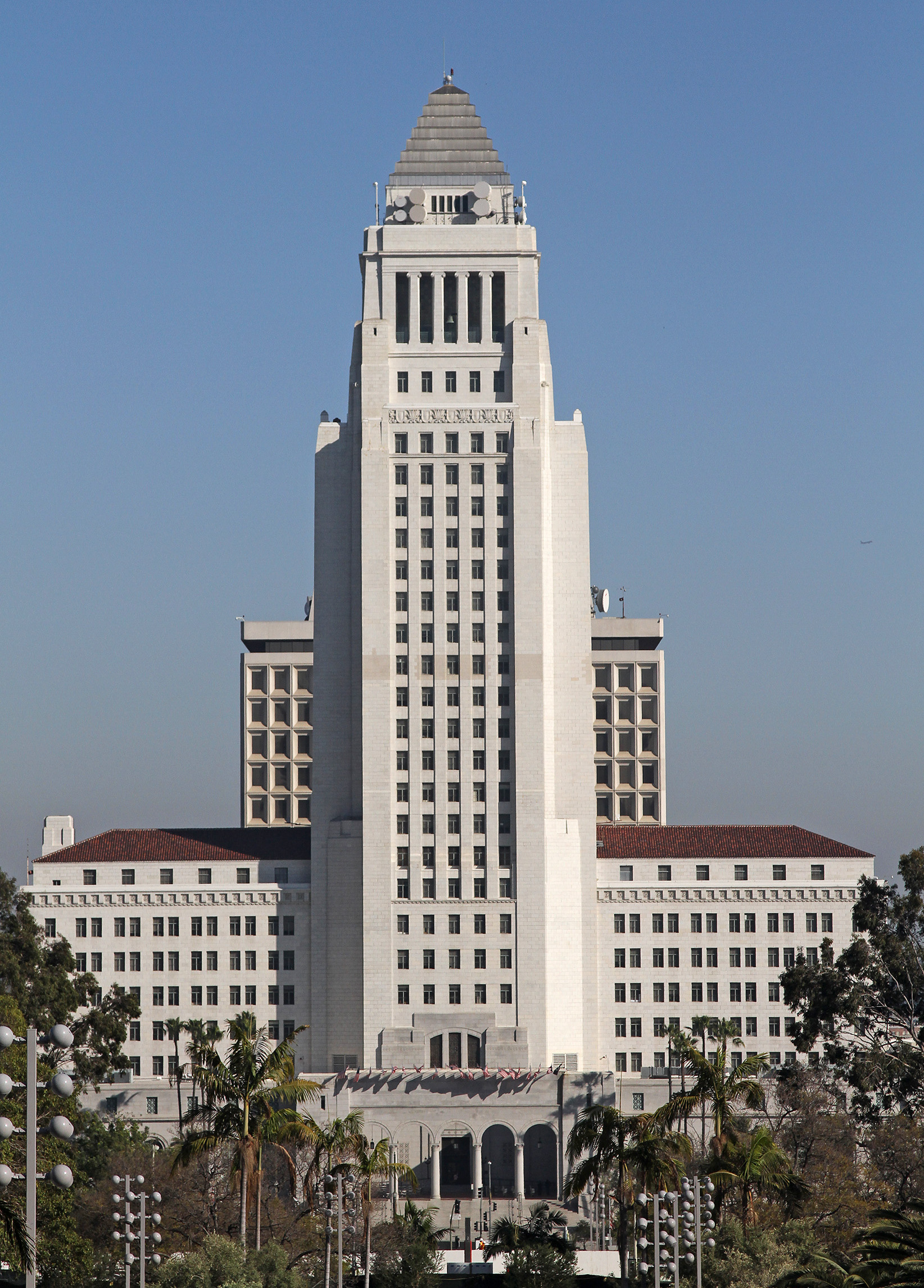
Los Angeles City Hall

The government of the city of Los Angeles includes the following city officers:

- Mayor
- Members of the Council
- City Attorney
- City Clerk
- Controller
- Treasurer
- The members of the boards or commissions of the departments and the chief administrative officer of each department and office
- An executive director of the Board of Police Commissioners
- Other officers as prescribed by ordinance

=== Mayor ===
The mayor of Los Angeles is the chief executive officer of the city. The officeholder is elected for a four-year term, and limited to serving no more than two terms. The 43rd and current mayor is Karen Bass.

=== City Council ===
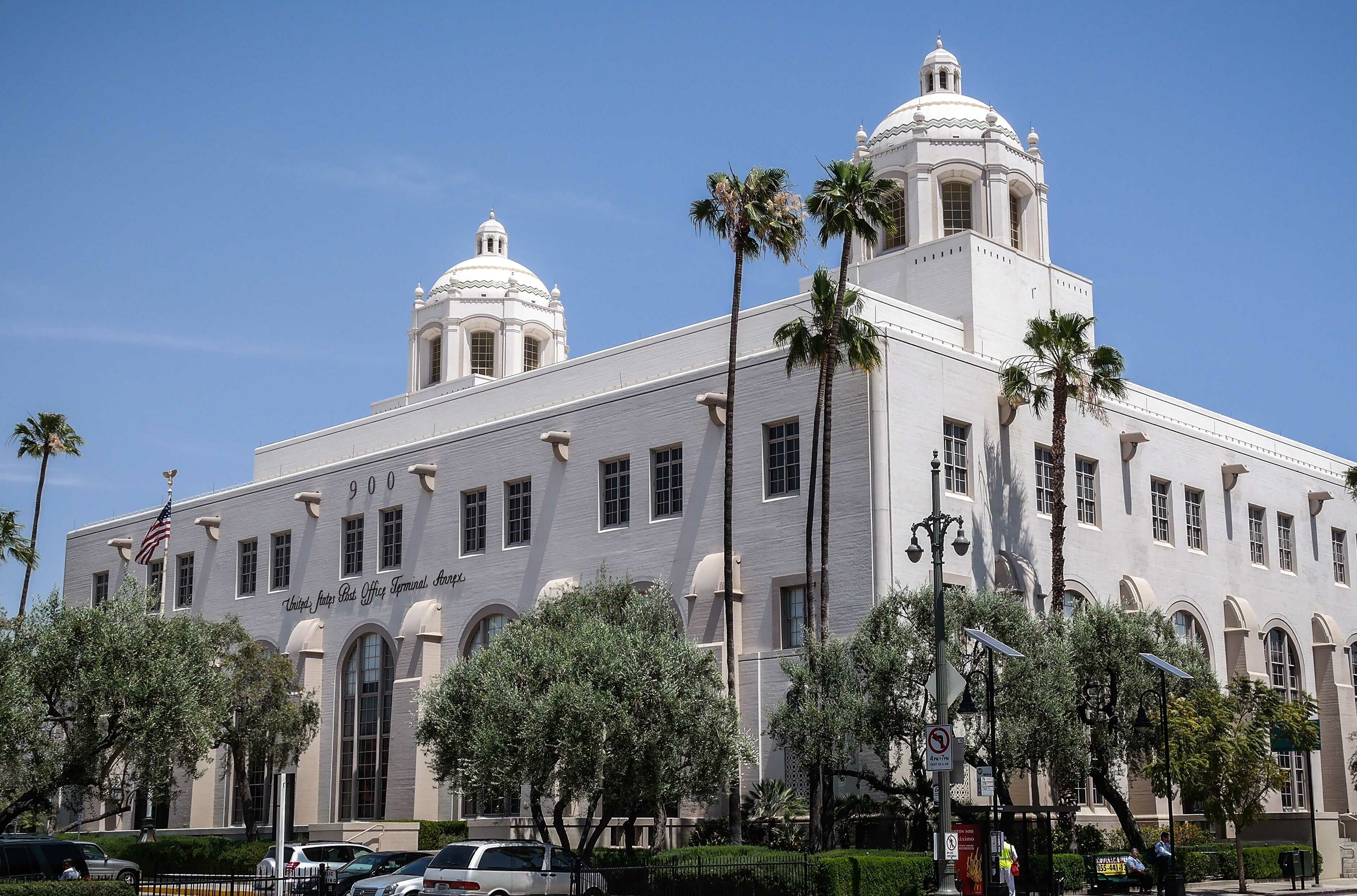
Terminal Annex Post Office

The Los Angeles City Council is the governing body of Los Angeles. The council is composed of fifteen members elected from single-member districts for four-year terms and limited to three terms. The president of the council and the president pro tempore are chosen by the council at the first regular meeting after June 30 in odd-numbered years. An assistant president pro tempore is appointed by the president. The current president of the Los Angeles City Council is Marqueece Harris-Dawson, the president pro tempore is Bob Blumenfield and the assistant president pro tempore is Nithya Raman.

Regular council meetings are held in the City Hall on Tuesdays, Wednesdays and Fridays at 10 am except on holidays or if decided by special resolution.

=== Police Department ===
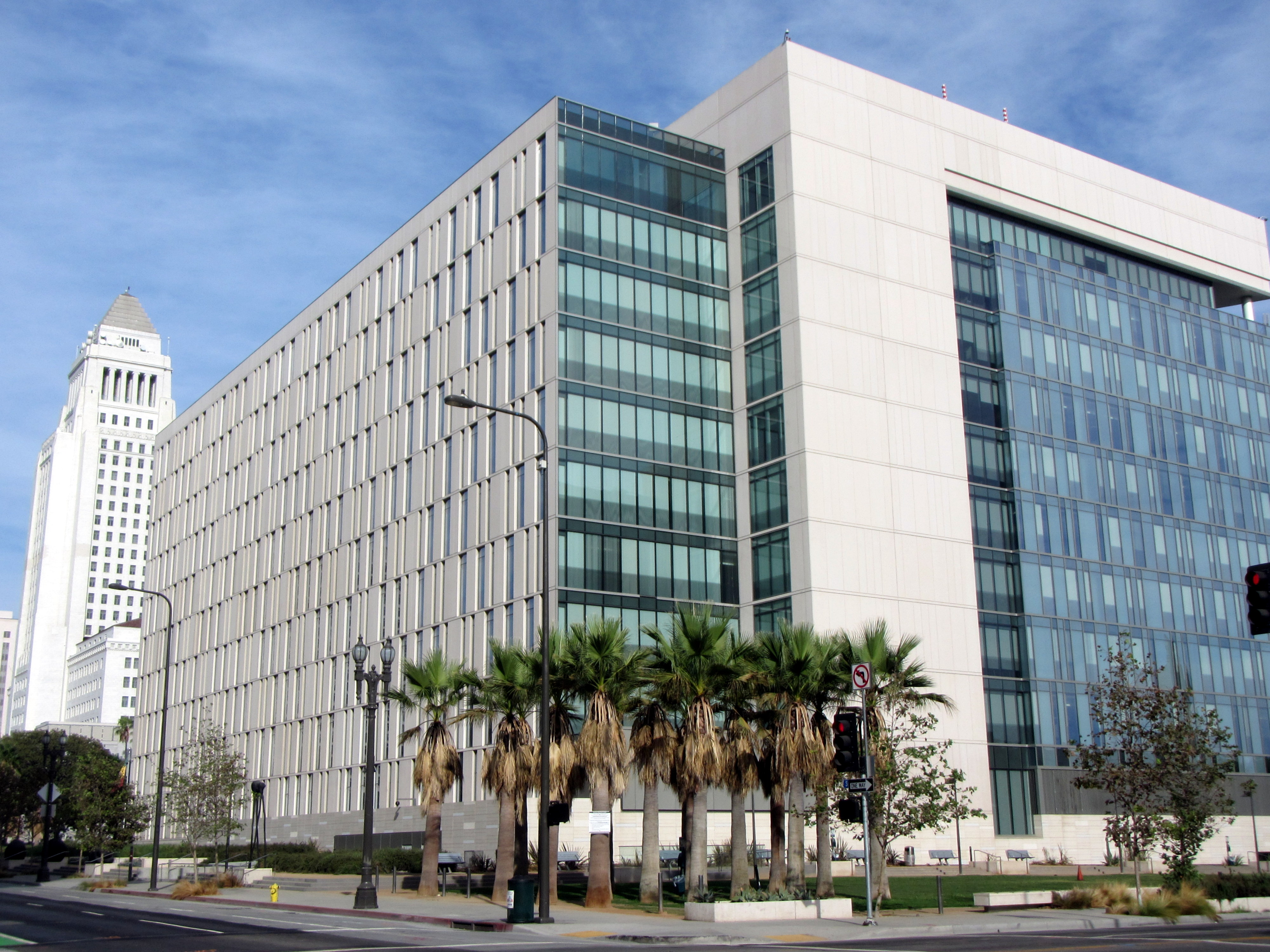
Los Angeles Police Department

The Los Angeles Police Department (LAPD) police the city of Los Angeles. It is governed by the Los Angeles Board of Police Commissioners and the Chief of the Los Angeles Police Department.

The city also maintains specialized police agencies; the Port Police, within the Harbor Department (which is responsible for land, air and sea law enforcement services at the Port of Los Angeles), Los Angeles City Park Rangers, within the Parks and Recreation Department (which are responsible for security and fire protection in Griffith Park), and the Airport Police, within the Los Angeles World Airports Department (which is responsible for law enforcement services for the 2 city-owned airports; Los Angeles International Airport (LAX), and Van Nuys Airport (VNY)). The Los Angeles General Services Police, which provided police coverage for Los Angeles city owned property and parks (except for Griffith Park) was absorbed into the LAPD in 2012. The Los Angeles Unified School District maintains its own separate police department, as do many other school districts and college campuses within the city.

=== Neighborhood councils ===
The charter of the City of Los Angeles ratified by voters in 1999 created a system of advisory neighborhood councils that would represent the diversity of stakeholders, defined as those who live, work or own property in the neighborhood. The neighborhood councils are relatively autonomous and spontaneous in that they identify their own boundaries, establish their own bylaws, and elect their own officers. There are currently 99 neighborhood councils.

=== Other ===
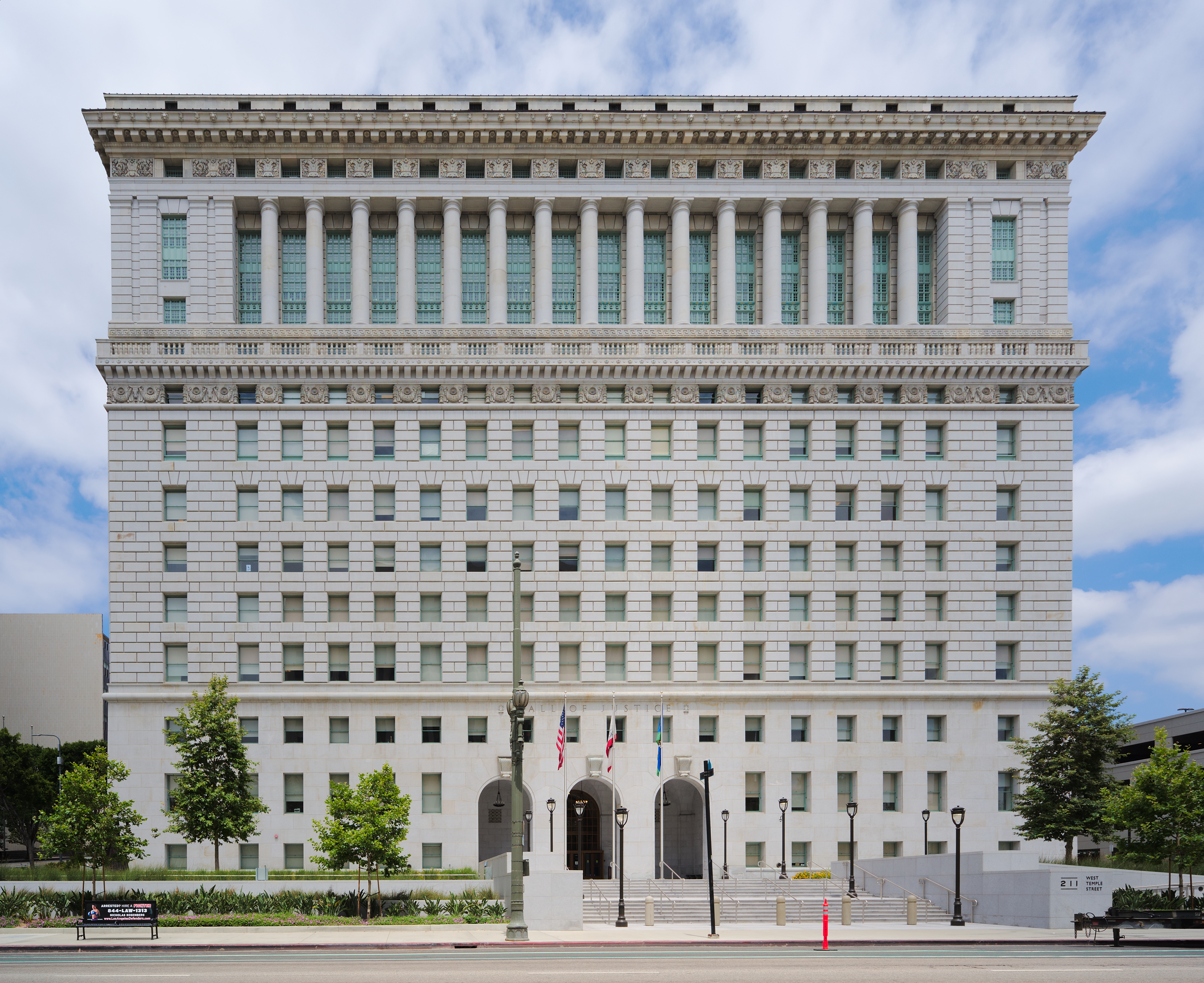
Hall of Justice

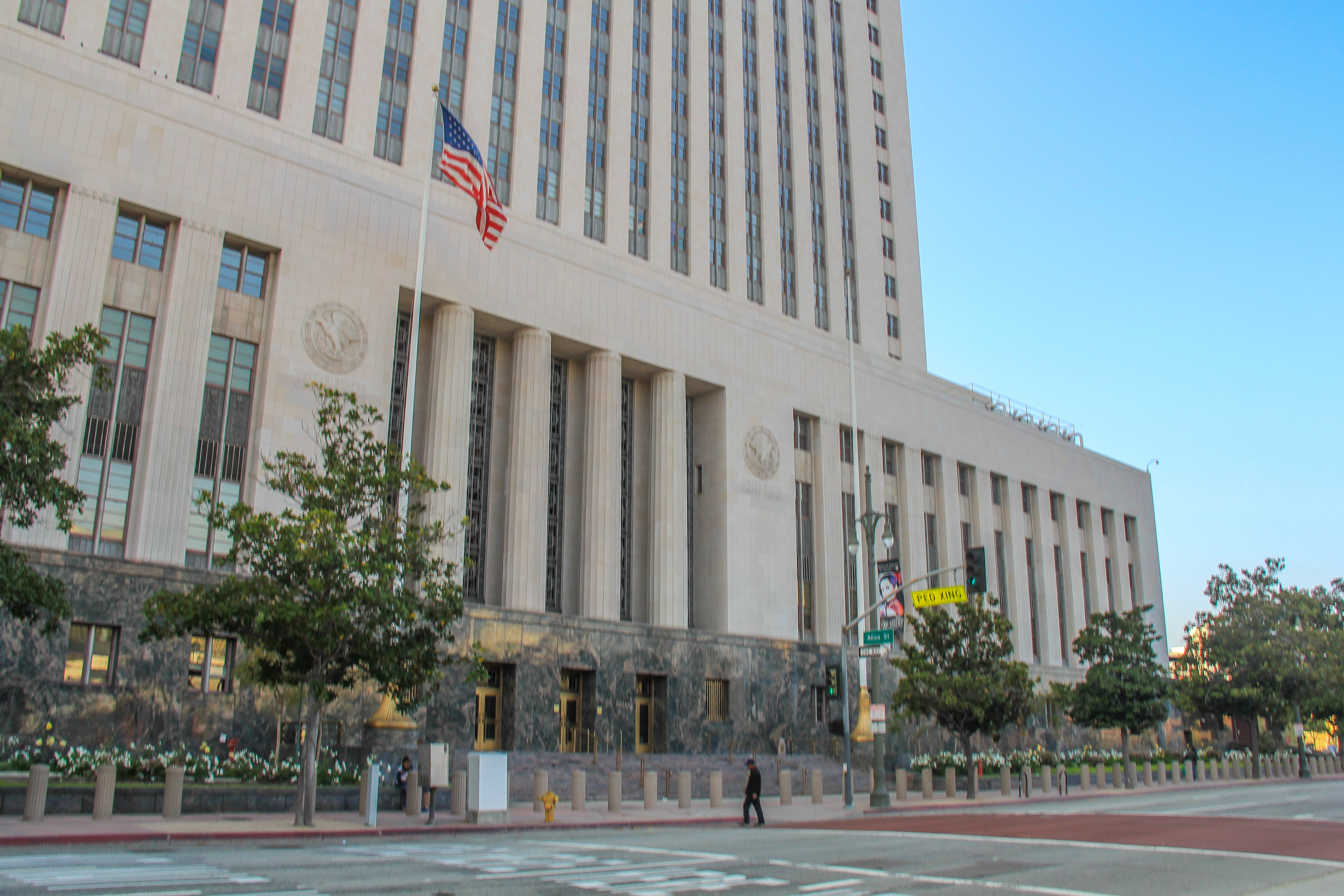
Spring Street Courthouse

The Los Angeles city attorney is an elected official whose job is legal counsel for the city and may prosecute misdemeanor criminal offenses within the city. The Los Angeles City Clerk is in charge of record-keeping for the city and elections. The Los Angeles City Controller is the elected auditor and chief accounting officer of the city. The Los Angeles City Treasurer handles financial matters.

== Personnel Department ==
The Personnel Department recruits employees, administers competitive examinations, and establishes eligible lists for employment. In addition, the Department recruits and examines sworn police and fire candidates and conducts background investigations. It establishes rules and regulations governing the promotion, transfer, leave of absence, removal, and reinstatement of City employees; administers the City's classification plan; administers the City's affirmative action and equal employment programs; and maintains a variety of employment records for all City employees.

The Personnel Department assists other departments with in-service training, placement, and counseling; administers employee health and dental insurance and other benefit programs; investigates grounds for removal or suspension of employees; investigates discrimination complaints; and conducts hearings. The Department administers pre-employment health examinations; administers a workers' compensation program, including vocational rehabilitation for City employees; and provides medical care for persons in custody of the Police Department. It administers the City's Trip Reduction/Commuter Services Program which includes ridesharing, vanpooling, mass transit subsidies and employee parking.

In addition, there are numerous departments and appointed officers such as the:

- Economic & Workforce Development Department (EWDD)
- Housing Authority of the City of Los Angeles (HACLA)
- Los Angeles City Clerk
- Los Angeles Fire Department (LAFD)
- Los Angeles Housing + Community Investment Department (HCIDLA)
- Los Angeles Public Library (LAPL)
- Los Angeles Department of Public Works (LADPW) https://dpw.lacity.gov/
- Los Angeles Department of Recreation and Parks
- Los Angeles Department of Transportation (LADOT)
- Los Angeles Department of Water and Power (LADWP)
- Los Angeles Department of City Planning (LADCP) https://planning.lacity.gov/
- Los Angeles World Airports
  - Los Angeles Airport Police
  - Los Angeles International Airport
  - Van Nuys Airport
- Office of Finance
- Personal Department https://personnel.lacity.gov
- Port of Los Angeles
  - Los Angeles Port Police

== Elections ==
The most recent elections were in May 2013, with 13th district city councilman Eric Garcetti defeating city controller Wendy Greuel for Mayor. The voter turnout was about 19% of registered voters, one of the lowest turnouts on record, with Garcetti garnering about 54% of the votes.

== Politics ==
Los Angeles has voted for every Democratic Party candidate for president since at least 1964. In the seven presidential elections since George H.W. Bush's re-election bid in 1992, no Republican candidate has received as much as 30% of the vote in Los Angeles. In 2024, Donald Trump was the first Republican since George W. Bush to surpass 25% in the city, while Kamala Harris was the first Democrat since Barack Obama in 2012 to get less than 1 million votes in the city.

Los Angeles vote by party in presidential elections
Year	Democratic	Republican
2024	70.16% 976,781	26.49% 369,619
2020	76.6% 1,223,737	21.4% 342,545
2016	78.5% 1,017,038	16.4% 212,080
2012	76.4% 902,038	21.0% 248,182
2008	76.3% 931,093	21.8% 265,941
2004	71.4% 785,489	27.4% 301,097
2000	73.1% 574,300	22.2% 174,693
1996	67.2% 576,146	23.5% 201,739
1992	62.4% 633,283	21.7% 220,539
1988	61.3% 607,541	37.4% 370,980
1984	54.9% 503,393	44.0% 404,232
1980	47.6% 424,363	42.0% 374,604
1976	56.3% 517,485	41.8% 383,774
1972	51.2% 549,176	46.3% 496,896
1968	55.7% 565,804	39.9% 405,570
1964	64.5% 696,234	35.5% 383,144

== Law ==
The charter of the City of Los Angeles is the founding document of Los Angeles. Pursuant to its charter, all legislative power is vested in the council and is exercised by ordinance subject to a veto by the Mayor.

Pursuant to this power, the council has caused to be promulgated the Administrative Code, consisting of administrative and procedural ordinances, and the Municipal Code, consisting of codified regulatory and penal ordinances. Violations of the ordinances are misdemeanor crimes unless otherwise specified as an infraction and may be prosecuted by city authorities.

== Other governments ==
=== California ===
The Los Angeles Superior Court, which covers the entire county, is not a county department but a division of the State's trial court system. Historically, the courthouses were county-owned buildings that were maintained at county expense, which created significant friction since the trial court judges, as officials of the state government, had to lobby the county Board of Supervisors for facility renovations and upgrades. In turn, the state judiciary successfully persuaded the state Legislature to authorize the transfer of all courthouses to the state government in 2008 and 2009 (so that judges would have direct control over their own courthouses). Courthouse security is still provided by the county government under a contract with the state.

=== Los Angeles County ===
Los Angeles is also part of Los Angeles County, for which the government of Los Angeles County is defined and authorized under the California Constitution, California law, and the charter of the County of Los Angeles. The county government provides countywide services such as elections and voter registration, law enforcement, jails, vital records, property records, tax collection, public health, and social services. The county government is primarily composed of the elected five-member Board of Supervisors, other elected offices including the sheriff, district attorney, and assessor, and numerous county departments and entities under the supervision of the chief executive officer. The majority of the county department headquarters are physically located within the city of Los Angeles.

== See also ==
- Government of New York City
