= Faisal Gill =

Pakistani-American lawyer and politician

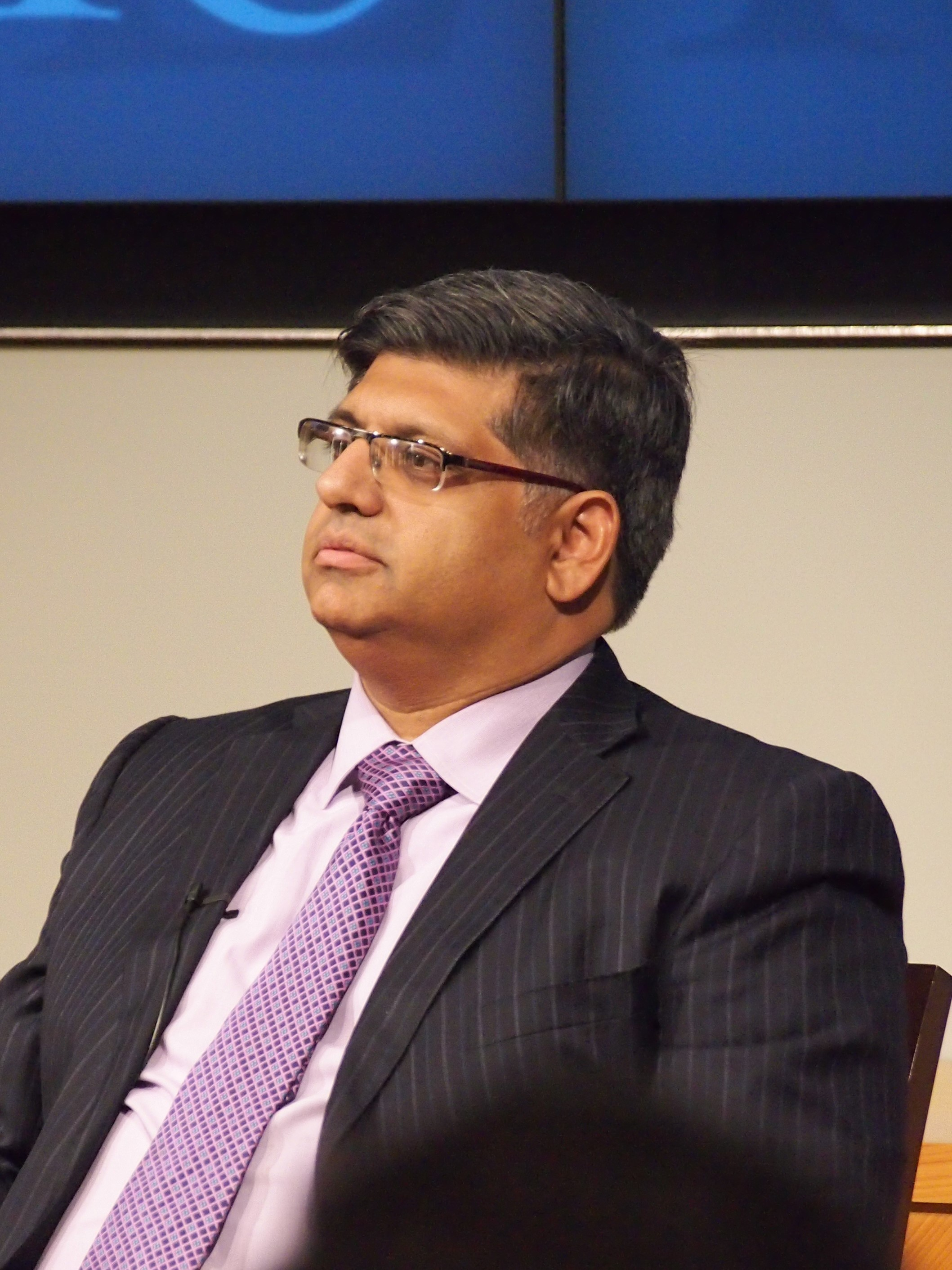

Chair of the Vermont Democratic Party
- Acting
- In office March 4, 2017 – November 18, 2017
- Preceded by: Dottie Deans
- Succeeded by: Terje Anderson

Personal details
- Born: Faisal Mahmood Gill; 1972 (age 53–54) Karachi, Pakistan
- Party: Republican (Before 2007); Democratic (2007–present)
- Education: American University (BA, JD)

Faisal Mahmood Gill (born June, 1972) is a Pakistani-born American lawyer, administrator, and government advisor, who served as the interim chairman of the Vermont Democratic Party for several months in 2017. In July 2014, it was revealed by Glenn Greenwald through the Edward Snowden leaks that Gill was one of five prominent Muslim United States citizens that were under NSA surveillance. In 2022, Gill was a candidate for Los Angeles City Attorney.

== Biography ==
In 2007, Gill ran for a seat in the Virginia House of Delegates as a Republican losing to Democratic opponent Paul F. Nichols. In 2012, Gill relocated to Winooski, Vermont. In 2016, he was a candidate in the Democratic Primary for one of six seats in the multi-member Chittenden Senate District of Vermont. On March 4, 2017, Gill was elected as interim chairman of the Vermont Democratic Party, becoming the first-ever Muslim to lead a state party. He was not a candidate for a full term in November. In 2018, Gill moved to Porter Ranch, a neighborhood of Los Angeles, California.

== Homeland Security career and targeting ==
In 2003, Gill served as a spokesman for the American Muslim Council, an organization founded by Abdurahman Alamoudi to encourage Muslim political participation. al-Alamoudi was sentenced to 23 years in federal prison for bringing over one million dollars in cash provided by the Libyan government into the U.S.

After being appointed by George W. Bush as a policy director for the Department of Homeland Security, Gill was investigated by officials in connection to al-Amoudi but was ultimately cleared by a polygraph test and allowed to resume work. However, pundit Frank Gaffney led a public campaign to discredit Gill, highlighting the brief inquiry into Gill's AMC connections and soliciting letters from Congressional Republicans calling for an investigation. In a 2004 statement defending Gill, a DHS spokesman said: "DHS is confident that our security clearance process is effective. Mr. Gill was thoroughly vetted at several levels. Mr. Gill did not withhold information on government forms required to initiate government security clearance processing and has been cooperative throughout the process." Faisal Gill left the Department of Homeland Security in January, 2005.

In 2014, NSA documents leaked by Edward Snowden revealed that the NSA had been spying on Gill and several other prominent Muslim-Americans beginning in 2006.

Asked whether he believes he would have been monitored by the NSA if he were not Muslim, Gill is blunt. "Absolutely not," he says. "Look, I've never made an appearance or been a lawyer for anyone who's been [associated with terrorism]. But there are plenty of other lawyers who have made those appearances and actually represented those governments, and their name isn't Faisal Gill and they weren’t born in Pakistan and they aren't on this list."

== Anti-LGBT marriage activism ==
In October 2006, Gill appeared on behalf of The Virginians for Marriage and the Family Foundation in a public forum in support of the Virginia Marriage Amendment which barred recognition of gay marriage in the state of Virginia. At the forum, Gill stated, "I believe that marriage should be between a man and a woman". Gill also said that without the amendment marriage would be rendered meaningless. The amendment passed with 57% of the vote but was later ruled to be unconstitutional.

Gill has since reversed his position and now supports marriage equality.

== Campaign for L.A. City Attorney ==
In March 2021, Faisal Gill announced his campaign for Los Angeles City Attorney in 2022. He won the primary alongside Hydee Feldstein Soto but was beaten by Soto in the runoff election in November 2022.

Party political offices
Preceded by Dottie Deans	Chair of the Vermont Democratic Party; Acting; 2017	Succeeded by Terje Anderson
