= Marissa Roy =

American attorney (born 1991/92)

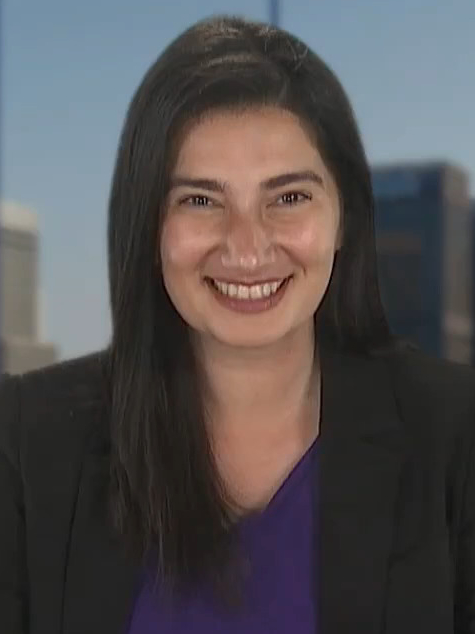
- Roy in 2026

City Attorney-elect of Los Angeles
- Assuming office December 14, 2026
- Succeeding: Hydee Feldstein Soto

Personal details
- Born: 1991 or 1992 (age 34–35) Monrovia, California, U.S.
- Party: Democratic
- Other political affiliations: Democratic Socialists of America; Working Families
- Education: University of Southern California (BA, MA); Yale University (JD)
- Website: Campaign website

Marissa Roy (born 1991/92) is an American attorney and politician who is the city attorney-elect of Los Angeles. A member of the Democratic Party and the Democratic Socialists of America, she defeated incumbent Hydee Feldstein Soto in the first round and challenger John McKinney in the runoff of the 2026 election. She has previously worked as a deputy attorney general in the California Department of Justice, where she played a key role in settling the state's federal lawsuit against Meta Platforms.

== Early life and education ==
Roy was raised in Monrovia, California, by an Indian immigrant mother and an American father. She attended Flintridge Preparatory School and graduated from the University of Southern California in 2014 with a bachelor's degree in philosophy, politics and law, as well as a master's in public diplomacy. She went on to earn her Juris Doctor from Yale Law School.

== Early career ==
During her time at Yale, she interned at the San Francisco City Attorney's Office. She then returned to Los Angeles where she was admitted to the State Bar of California and worked as a deputy city attorney from 2017 to 2018, where she focused on suing local businesses for wage theft. She later began working at O'Melveny & Myers, serving as an outside counsel for Los Angeles County, where she was involved with cases of immigration law against the first Trump administration.

While serving as a deputy attorney general at the California Department of Justice under Rob Bonta, Roy spearheaded a federal lawsuit against Meta Platforms, in which the state alleged the company neglected the safety of children using Facebook and Instagram. People of the State of California v. Meta Platforms, Inc. was filed in late 2023 and was eventually settled in August 2026, resulting in Meta agreeing to a $16.7 billion settlement and a list of promised changes to both platforms.

Roy has served on the board of the Southern California chapter of the American Civil Liberties Union, and was the political director for Ysabel Jurado's 2024 campaign for Los Angeles City Council. In July 2024, Roy was elected as a member representative of the California Working Families Party from the Los Angeles chapter.

== Los Angeles City Attorney ==
=== Election ===
On March 10, 2025, Roy announced her candidacy for Los Angeles City Attorney in the 2026 election, challenging one-term incumbent Hydee Feldstein Soto. Her campaign focused on protecting residents from policies of the Trump administration, as well as criticizing Soto's efforts to block the construction of affordable housing and prosecute journalists. She received endorsements from the Los Angeles Democratic Socialists of America, several labor unions, and U.S. Senator Bernie Sanders, among others.

In the June primary, Roy led the field of four candidates with 43.1% of the vote. She advanced to the November runoff election against prosecutor John McKinney as Soto fell to third place, ending her re-election bid. Roy went on to handily defeat McKinney in the runoff with 67% of the vote.

=== Tenure ===
Roy is set to take office on December 14, 2026.

Legal offices
Preceded by Hydee Feldstein Soto	Los Angeles City Attorney; Taking office 2026	Elect
