= Muppies =

Organization of professional Muslims

Muppies – Muslim Urban Professionals
- Formation: 2006
- Type: Non-profit NGO
- Headquarters: New York City
- Region served: World
- Members: 2,200+
- Website: muppies.org

Muppies – Muslim Urban Professionals is a worldwide 501(c)(3) charitable organization of Muslim members. It has chapters in Atlanta, Boston, New York City, Dallas, San Francisco, Seattle, Chicago, Washington, D.C., Houston, Los Angeles, London, Toronto, and Dubai.

Members gain access to job postings and networking events.

== See also ==
- American Muslim Council
- Council on American-Islamic Relations
- Canadian Council on American-Islamic Relations
- Muslim Public Affairs Council
- Muslim American Society
