= 2022 Los Angeles City Attorney election =

Election

- November 8, 2022
- Registered: 1,608,639
- Turnout: 28.58%
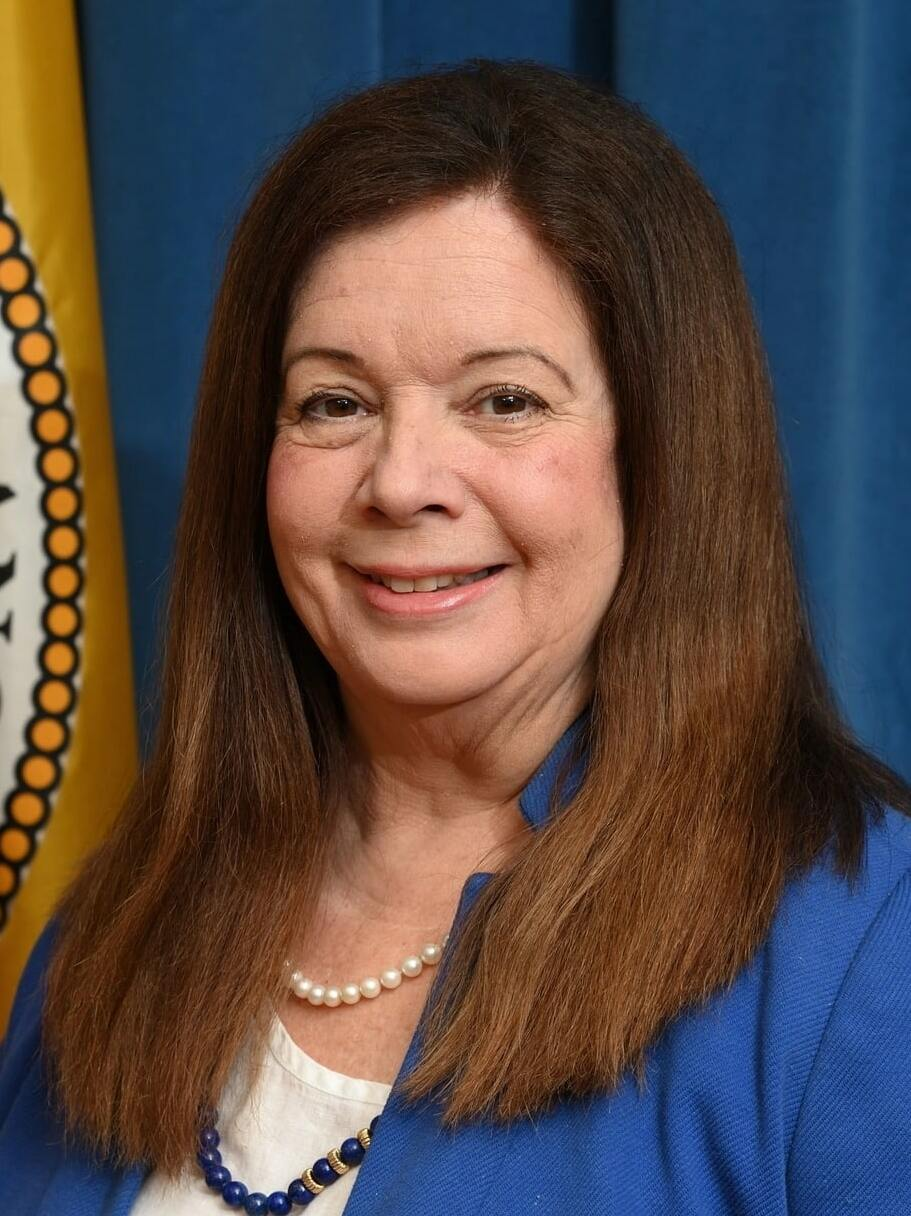

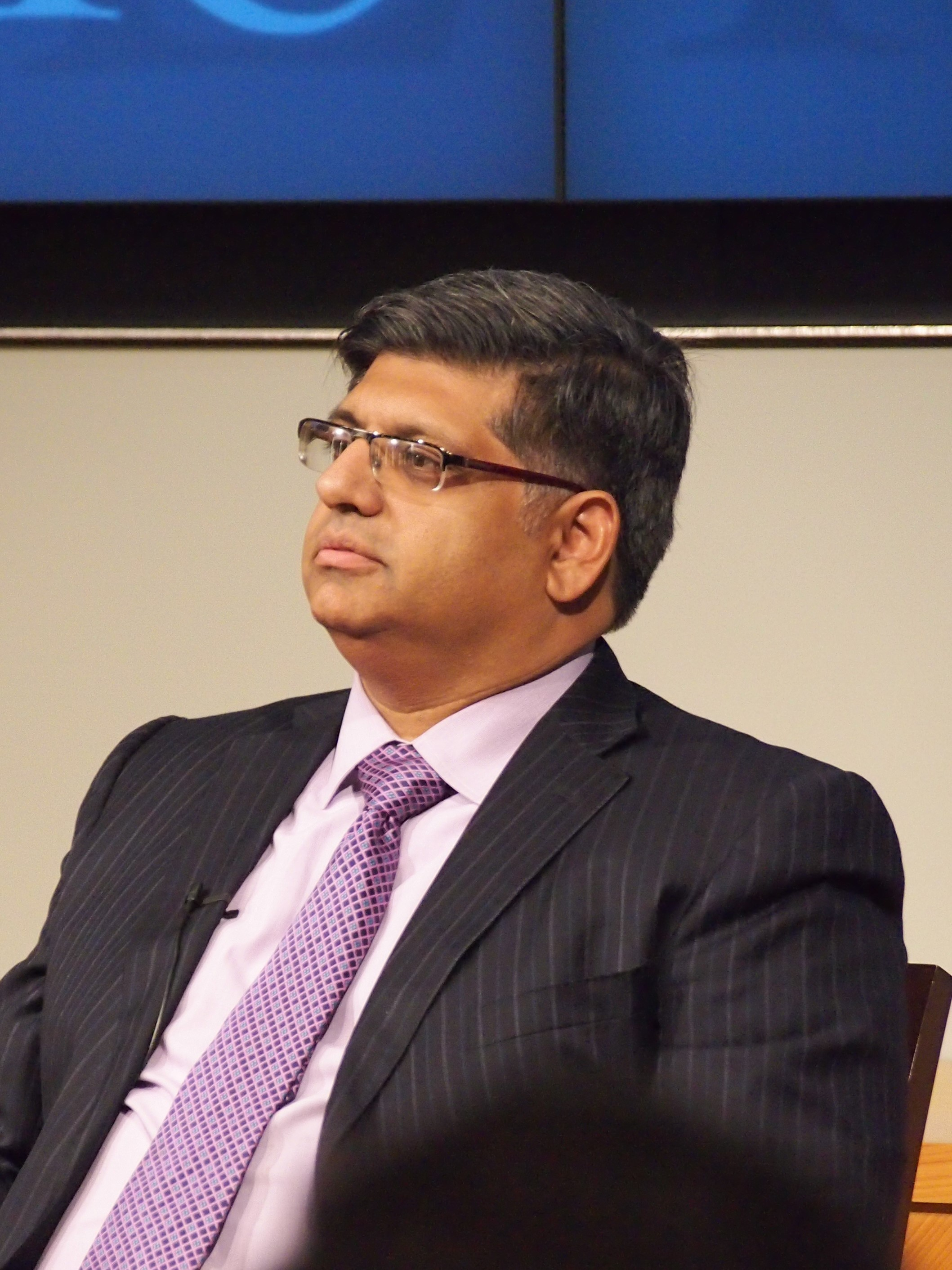

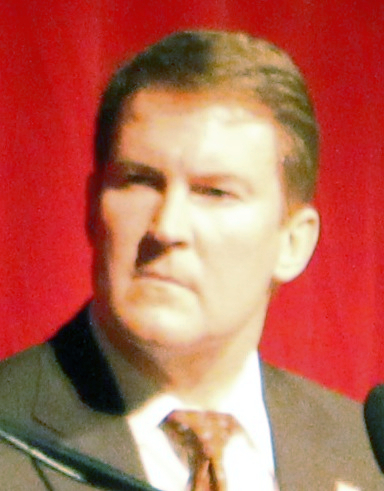

| Candidate | Hydee Feldstein Soto | Faisal Gill | Marina Torres |
| First round | 112,978; 19.90% | 137,554; 24.23% | 112,842; 19.87% |
| Runoff | 440,211; 55.36% | 354,941; 44.64% | Eliminated |
| Candidate | Richard Kim | Kevin James | Teddy Kapur |
| First round | 93,660; 16.50% | 51,606; 9.09% | 30,421; 5.36% |
| Runoff | Eliminated | Eliminated | Eliminated |
- Feldstein Soto: 50–60% 60–70% Gill: 50–60%
City Attorney before election
Mike Feuer
Elected City Attorney
Hydee Feldstein Soto

The 2022 Los Angeles City Attorney election was held on June 7, 2022. Voters elected candidates in a nonpartisan primary, with the top-two runoff election occurring on November 8, 2022. Incumbent city attorney Mike Feuer was term-limited, and instead ran unsuccessfully for mayor in the same election cycle.

== Nonpartisan primary ==
=== Candidates ===
==== Advanced to general ====
- Hydee Feldstein Soto, attorney and neighborhood councilmember
- Faisal Gill, civil rights attorney

==== Eliminated in primary ====
- Kevin James, broadcaster and former Assistant U.S. Attorney for Southern California (endorsed Feldstein Soto in the runoff)
- Teddy Kapur, attorney and partner at Pachulski Stang Ziehl & Jones LLP
- Richard Kim, deputy city attorney and former president of the Korean Prosecutors Association
- Marina Torres, litigator and Assistant U.S. Attorney
- Sherri Onica Valle Cole, attorney and educator

==== Withdrawn ====
- Rick Zbur, executive director of Equality California

=== Endorsements ===
Hydee Feldstein Soto

U.S. representatives

- Howard Berman, CA-28 (1983–2013)

Organizations

- Los Angeles County Democratic Party

Newspapers and other media

- Daily Breeze
- Inland Valley Daily Bulletin
- Los Angeles Daily News
- Los Angeles Times
Faisal Gill

U.S. representatives

- ~~Karen Bass, CA-37 (2013–2022) and mayoral candidate~~ (rescinded)
- Ami Bera, CA-07 (2013–present)
- Ro Khanna, CA-17 (2017–present)
- Ilhan Omar, MN-05 (2019–present)

Statewide officials

- Keith Ellison, attorney general of Minnesota (2019–present)

State legislators

- Isaac Bryan, state assemblyman from the 54th district (2021–2022) and 55th district (2022–present)

Local officials

- Holly Mitchell, member of the Los Angeles County Board of Supervisors (2020–present)

Individuals

- Melina Abdullah, professor and co-founder of BLM-LA

Labor unions

- SEIU Local 2015
- California Faculty Association
- National Union of Healthcare Workers
Kevin James

Local officials

- Eric Garcetti, mayor of Los Angeles (2013–2022)

Labor unions

- Los Angeles Police Protective League
- SEIU Local 721 (endorsed Gill in the runoff)

Organizations

- Equality California

=== Results ===
2022 Los Angeles City Attorney election
Primary election
| Candidate | Votes | % |
|---|---|---|
| Faisal Gill | 137,554 | 24.23% |
| Hydee Feldstein Soto | 112,978 | 19.90% |
| Marina Torres | 112,842 | 19.87% |
| Richard Kim | 93,660 | 16.50% |
| Kevin James | 51,606 | 9.09% |
| Teddy Kapur | 30,421 | 5.36% |
| Sherri Onica Valle Cole | 28,716 | 5.06% |
| Total votes | 567,777 | 100.00% |

== Runoff ==
=== Post-primary endorsements ===
Hydee Feldstein Soto

Executive branch officials

- Hilda Solis, former United States Secretary of Labor (2009–2013)

U.S. representatives

- Katie Hill, CA-25 (2019)

Organizations

- Sierra Club
- Los Angeles League of Conservation Voters
- Stonewall Democratic Club

Labor unions

- Los Angeles Airport Police Officers Association

Newspapers and other media

- Los Angeles Times
- La Opinión
- Los Angeles Sentinel
Faisal Gill

Labor unions

- California Nurses Association

Organizations

- Jane Fonda Climate PAC

=== Results ===
2022 Los Angeles City Attorney runoff election
| Candidate | Votes | % |
|---|---|---|
| Hydee Feldstein Soto | 442,926 | 55.33% |
| Faisal Gill | 357,519 | 44.67% |
| Total votes | 800,445 | 100.00 |
