= 2026 Los Angeles City Attorney election =

- November 3, 2026
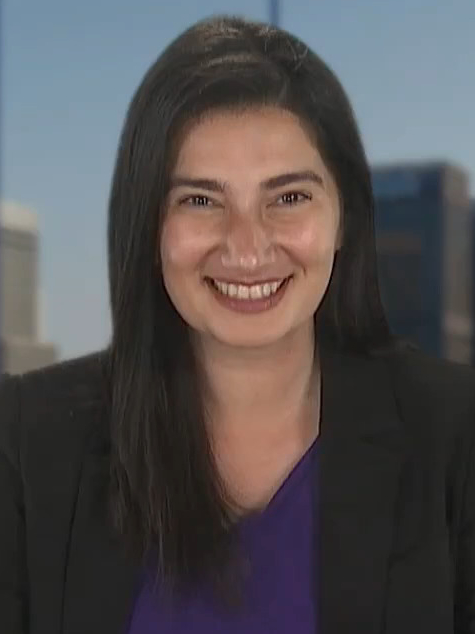

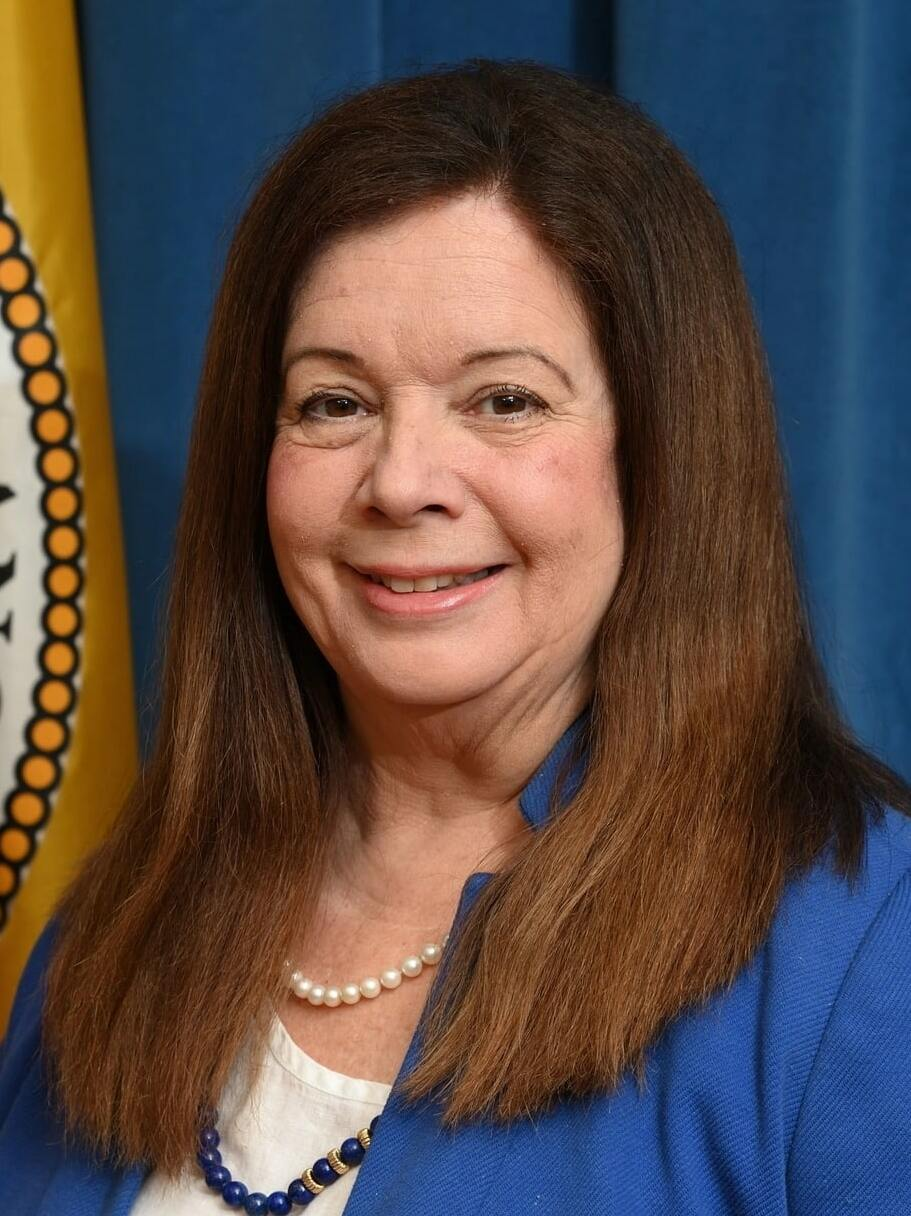

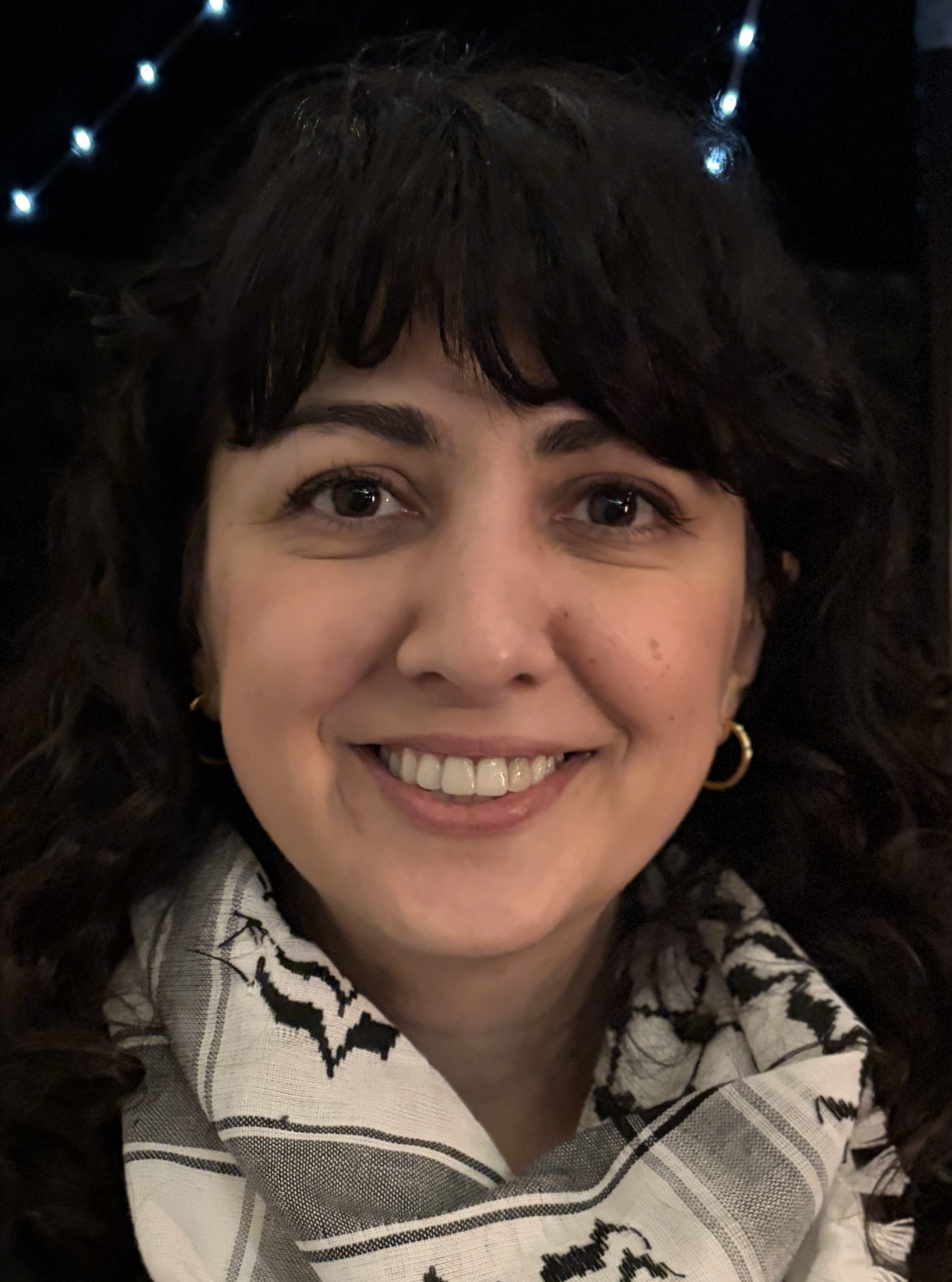
Candidate	Marissa Roy	John McKinney
First round	320,747; 43.1%	212,745; 28.6%
Runoff	712,380; 68.6%	326,766; 31.4%
Candidate	Hydee Feldstein Soto	Aida Ashouri
First round	133,789; 18.0%	76,537; 10.3%
Runoff	Eliminated	Eliminated
City attorney before election
Hydee Feldstein Soto
Elected City attorney
Marissa Roy

The 2026 Los Angeles City Attorney election was held on November 3, 2026, to elect the city attorney of Los Angeles. A nonpartisan primary was held on June 2, with the top two candidates advancing to the general election. Incumbent city attorney Hydee Feldstein Soto unsuccessfully ran for re-election to a second term.

== Nonpartisan primary ==
=== Candidates ===
==== Advanced to general ====
- Marissa Roy, deputy state attorney general
- John McKinney, deputy district attorney

==== Eliminated in primary ====
- Aida Ashouri, attorney and former deputy city attorney
- Hydee Feldstein Soto, incumbent city attorney

=== Endorsements ===
Aida Ashouri

Individuals

- Eric Mann, civil rights organizer

Political parties

- Peace and Freedom Party Los Angeles
Hydee Feldstein Soto

U.S. senators

- Adam Schiff, California (2024–present)

U.S. representatives

- Nanette Barragán, CA-44 (2017–present)
- Robert Garcia, CA-42 (2023–present)
- Ted Lieu, CA-36 (2015–present)
- Luz Rivas, CA-29 (2025–present)

County officials

- Janice Hahn, Los Angeles County supervisor from the 4th district (2016–present)

Local officials

- Karen Bass, mayor of Los Angeles (2022–present)
- Traci Park, city councilmember from the 11th district (2022–present)

Labor unions

- ~~Los Angeles Police Protective League~~ (endorsement rescinded; later endorsed McKinney)

Organizations

- Planned Parenthood Los Angeles

Newspapers

- Daily Breeze
- Los Angeles Daily News
- Los Angeles Sentinel
Marissa Roy

U.S. senators

- Bernie Sanders, Vermont (2007–present) (Independent)

U.S. representatives

- Derek Tran, CA-45 (2025–present)

Statewide officials

- Rob Bonta, attorney general of California (2021–present)

State legislators

- Caroline Menjivar, state senator from the 20th district (2022–present)

County officials

- Lindsey Horvath, Los Angeles County supervisor from the 3rd district (2022–present)

Local officials

- Eunisses Hernandez, city councilmember from the 1st district (2022–present)
- Kenneth Mejia, city controller of Los Angeles (2022–present)

Labor unions

- American Federation of Teachers Local 1521
- Committee of Interns and Residents
- International Longshore and Warehouse Union
- ILWU Locals 13, 56 & 63
- Ironworkers Locals 416 & 433
- Los Angeles County Federation of Labor
- National Union of Healthcare Workers
- SEIU Locals 1000, 121RN, 2015, 721 & 99
- SEIU United Healthcare Workers West
- SMART Local 105
- Teamsters Joint Council 42 and Local 572
- United Auto Workers Region 6
- United Teachers Los Angeles
- UURWAW Local 36

Organizations

- Abundant Housing LA
- Courage California
- Jane Fonda Climate PAC
- Los Angeles Democratic Socialists of America
- Los Angeles League of Conservation Voters
- Run for Something
- Stonewall Democratic Club

Political parties

- Los Angeles County Democratic Party
- California Working Families Party
John McKinney

County officials

- Steve Cooley, former district attorney of Los Angeles County (2000–2012) (Republican)
- Nathan Hochman, district attorney of Los Angeles County (2024–present)
- Jackie Lacey, former district attorney of Los Angeles County (2012–2020)

Labor unions

- Los Angeles Police Protective League (previously endorsed Feldstein Soto)

Individuals

- Ronald Burkle, businessperson
- Rick Caruso, businessperson
- Jamie Siminoff, businessperson

=== Results ===
2026 Los Angeles City Attorney election
Candidate	Votes	%
Marissa Roy	320,747	43.12
John McKinney	212,745	28.60
Hydee Feldstein Soto (incumbent)	133,789	17.99
Aida Ashouri	76,537	10.29
Total votes		

== Runoff ==
=== Results ===
2026 Los Angeles City Attorney runoff election
Candidate	Votes	%
Marissa Roy	712,380	68.55
John McKinney	326,766	31.45
Total votes	1,039,146	100.00
