= Flintridge Preparatory School =

School in La Cañada Flintridge, California, US

Coordinates: 34.198743°N 118.184032°W

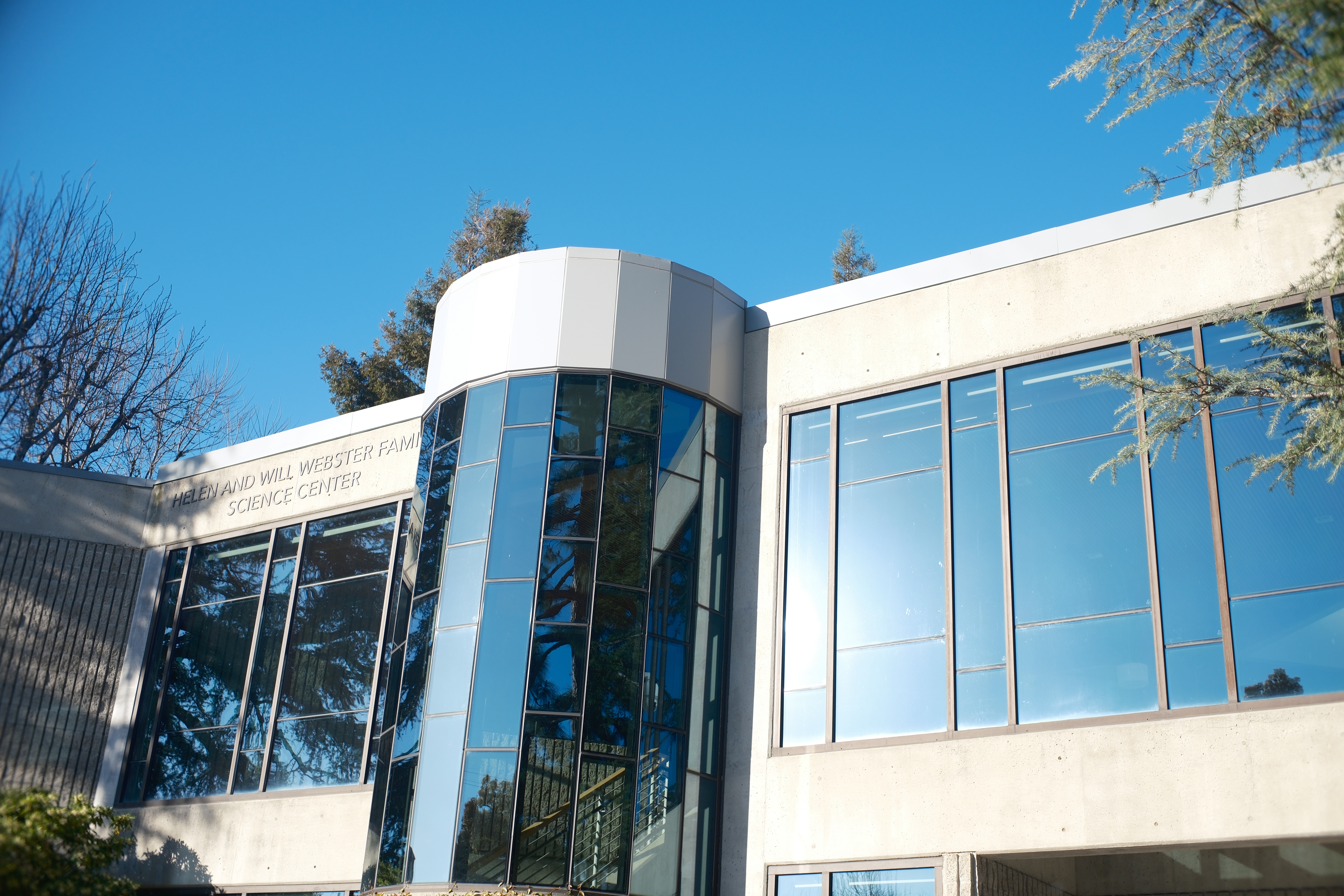

Location
- 4543 Crown Avenue; La Cañada Flintridge, California 91011; United States

Information
- Type: Private
- Established: 1933
- Founder: Doane Lowery
- Status: Active
- Headmaster: Vanessa Walker-Oakes
- Teaching staff: 72.6 (on an FTE basis)
- Grades: 7–12
- Gender: Coed
- Enrollment: 530 (2023–24)
- Student to teacher ratio: 7.3
- Language: English
- Colors: Blue, gray, and white
- Athletics conference: CIF Southern Section Prep League
- Mascot: The Wolf
- Nickname: Wolves
- Rival: Polytechnic School
- Accreditation: WASC
- Newspaper: The Flintridge Press
- Yearbook: The LOG
- Website: http://www.flintridgeprep.org

Flintridge Preparatory School, familiarly known as Flintridge Prep, or simply Prep, is a highly ranked coeducational day school for grades 7-12. Founded in 1933, it is located in La Cañada Flintridge, California, United States.

== Facilities ==
School facilities include a science/cultural center, multiple classroom buildings with labs renovated in 2014–2015, a workshop/fabrication lab called the Makerspace, a two-story library, a performing arts center, a 400-seat auditorium, an administration building with faculty offices, and a multi-purpose three-story office building known as the Bachman Collaboration Building (BCB).

The Chandramohan Library, renovated in 2025, is a two-story library and learning center with a computer lab, a seminar classroom, meeting rooms, space for individual and group study, and a laptop room.

== Student experience ==
More than 50% of students participate in performing arts, and two-thirds of high school students participate in one of the school's 13 varsity sports.

== History, values and scandal ==
Founded as an all-boys school, the school became coed in the academic year 1979–1980.

Each fall, all members of the community (including faculty and staff) sign the honor code, the universal code of ethics across campus, that states "My responsibility as a member of the Flintridge Prep community is to be honest, kind, generous, and respectful."

In 2023, Flintridge Preparatory School in La Cañada Flintridge became involved in a public abuse scandal after a former student filed a lawsuit alleging that she had been sexually groomed and abused by her Latin teacher, Edward “Toby” Wagstaff. The alleged misconduct began in 2013, when the student was 15 and the teacher was 31, and continued for several years, even after her graduation in 2016. According to the lawsuit, school administrators and faculty members were aware of the inappropriate relationship, and at least one high-level administrator had raised concerns with the headmaster, but those concerns were dismissed. The lawsuit further alleged that school officials failed to report the suspected abuse to law enforcement for years, taking action only after the former student filed a lawsuit in November 2023. The school stated that it became aware of the allegations in February 2023, placed the teacher on administrative leave, contacted the Los Angeles County Sheriff's Department, and terminated his employment in April 2023. The scandal raised serious questions about the school's accountability, its handling of abuse allegations, and its responsibility to protect students.

== Accreditation ==
Flintridge Prep is accredited by the California Association of Independent Schools and is a charter member of the Western Association of Schools and Colleges. It holds memberships in the California Association of Independent Schools, the National Association of Independent Schools, the Western Association of College Counselors, the Cum Laude Society, and the Educational Records Bureau. Flintridge complies with the National Association for College Admission Counseling's Statement of Principles of Good Practice. It also participates in the American Field Service and the Independent School Alliance for Minority Affairs.

== Enrollment ==
The student body includes approximately 530 students in grades 7 through 12, about 100 of whom are seniors. The middle school grades consist of 50 students each, which are then joined by 50 more in 9th grade.

== Graduation requirements ==
4 years of English, 3 of math, 3 of world languages, 3 of history; 2 of laboratory science, and 2 of fine arts are required.

== Notable alumni ==
- Ramses Barden, professional football player
- J. P. Blecksmith, military officer who was the first officer killed in Operation Phantom Fury during Operation Iraqi Freedom II
- Stephen J. Cannell, television producer, writer, and novelist
- Kaitlyn Chen, basketball player
- Mark Geragos, attorney
- Sarah Gilman, actor
- Laurie Fortier, actor
- Harry Hamlin, actor
- Jeff Krosnoff (deceased), IndyCar driver
- Bill Monning, California State Senator
- Dennis Muren, Academy Award winner, filmmaker, special effects honoree
- Emily Osment, actor
- Haley Joel Osment, Academy Award-nominated actor
- Cristina Perez, attorney, television personality, and writer
- Marissa Roy, attorney
- Chayse Ying, soccer player
