= J. P. Blecksmith =

American military officer (1980–2004)

J.P. Blecksmith
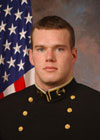
- Born: James Patrick Blecksmith; September 26, 1980; Pasadena, California
- Died: November 11, 2004 (aged 24); Fallujah, Iraq
- Military career
- Allegiance: United States of America
- Branch: United States Marine Corps
- Service years: April 2003 – November 2004
- Rank: 2nd Lieutenant
- Units: 3rd Battalion, 5th Marine Regiment, 1st Marine Division
- Conflicts: Iraq War; Operation Phantom Fury; Operation Iraqi Freedom II
- Awards: Bronze Star; Purple Heart

James Patrick "J.P." Blecksmith (September 26, 1980 – November 11, 2004) was an American military officer who became the first officer killed during Operation Phantom Fury in Operation Iraqi Freedom II.

== Biography ==
Blecksmith was born in Pasadena, California, on September 26, 1980 to Pamela and Edward "Ed" Blecksmith, with two older siblings Christina and Charles "Alex". He attended Valentine School in San Marino through 2nd grade before his family moved to Seattle, Washington in 1989. After two years, the family returned to Southern California, and Blecksmith enrolled at Flintridge Preparatory School, where he graduated in 1999. Upon graduation from high school, Blecksmith entered the United States Naval Academy in June 1999. Blecksmith's father had served in the Marine Corps during the Vietnam War.

=== United States Naval Academy ===
Although heavily recruited, Blecksmith saw limited action on the field for the Naval Academy. He fit the prototype of the 21st-century quarterback at 6'3" and 216 pounds, with a strong arm, but Navy ran a triple-option offense, where the quarterback was more of a runner than a passer. As a backup quarterback, he completed 3 of his 4 passes, returned 2 kickoffs, and caught a pass as a wide receiver during the Army–Navy Game in 2001.

== Military career ==
After graduating from the Naval Academy in May 2003, Blecksmith was commissioned as a 2nd Lieutenant in the United States Marine Corps.

== Death ==
On March 31, 2004, Iraqi insurgents in Fallujah ambushed a convoy containing four American private military contractors from Blackwater USA, who were conducting a delivery for the food catering company ESS.

The contractors were dragged from their vehicles, beaten, and set on fire. Their burned corpses were then dragged through the streets before being hung over a bridge crossing the Euphrates River. Photographs of the event were released to news outlets worldwide, causing outrage in the United States and prompting a campaign to reestablish American control over the city.

This led to an unsuccessful U.S. operation to recapture the city in Operation Vigilant Resolve, followed by a successful operation in November 2004 called Operation Phantom Fury (known as Operation Al Fajr in Arabic). Blecksmith's India Company was the first to enter the city and begin house-to-house search operations in the Jolan District. On November 11, Blecksmith was killed by small arms fire while leading the third platoon in clearing buildings. A bullet entered his left shoulder and deflected down to his heart. Operation Phantom Fury resulted in the deaths of over 1,350 insurgent fighters. Approximately 95 American Marines were killed, and more than 1,000 were wounded.

== Legacy ==
On Veterans Day, November 11, 2006, exactly two years after Blecksmith's family received the news of his death in Iraq, the Marines renamed Pasadena's Marine Corps Reserve Center in his honor. The JP Blecksmith Leadership Foundation was created to perpetuate the legacy of his sacrifice. It has been hosting the annual JP Blecksmith Memorial 5K in La Cañada Flintridge since 2005, with the event's proceeds going towards supporting memorial scholarships. They also have supported veterans’ memorials around the San Gabriel Valley.

A plaque of Blecksmith is featured on the Memorial Fountain on the Flintridge Preparatory School's campus, next to the Memorial Field. On April 20, 2005, James Patrick Blecksmith was posthumously awarded the Purple Heart and the Bronze Star for his courage and bravery.

In season 4 of NCIS, actor Mark Harmon wears a J.P. Blecksmith memorial t-shirt in the episode "In The Dark." Additionally, in the September 29, 2009 episode "Reunion," Harmon (as Gibbs) again wears a J.P. Blecksmith memorial t-shirt in an early scene.
