= Hydee Feldstein Soto =

American attorney and politician (born 1958)

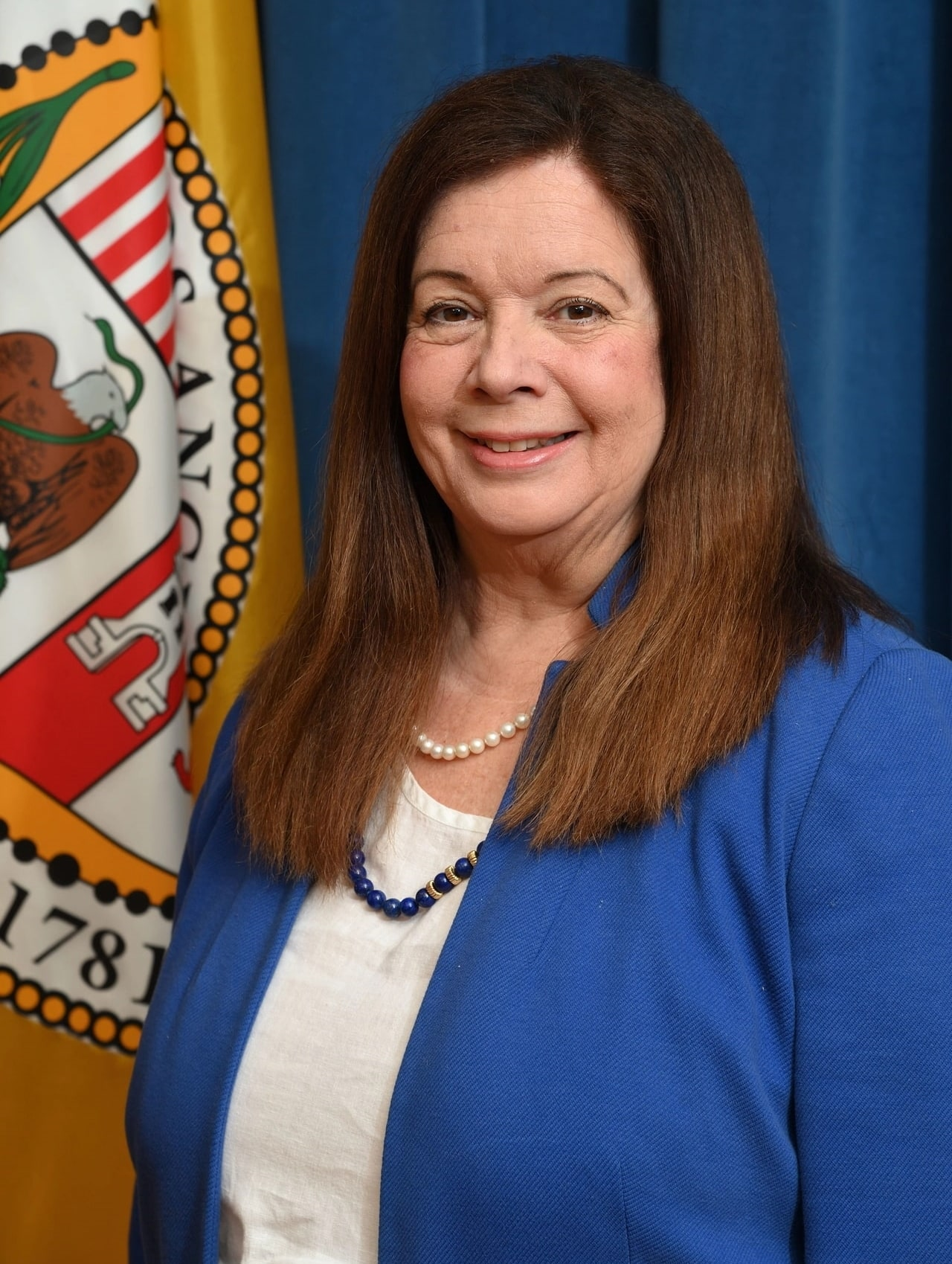
- Official portrait, 2023

43rd City Attorney of Los Angeles
- Incumbent
- Assumed office December 12, 2022
- Mayor: Karen Bass
- Preceded by: Mike Feuer

Personal details
- Born: 1958 (age 67–68) San Juan, Puerto Rico, U.S.
- Party: Democratic
- Education: Swarthmore College (BA); Columbia University (JD)

Hydee Feldstein Soto (born 1958) is an American attorney and politician who is the City Attorney of Los Angeles. A member of the Democratic Party, she emerged from a crowded primary in the 2022 election to defeat Faisal Gill in a runoff. She was defeated in her bid for reelection by a landslide, placing third in the 2026 election.

== Early life and career ==
Feldstein Soto was born in 1958 in San Juan, Puerto Rico, and moved to the mainland United States at age 17 to attend Swarthmore College and Columbia Law School, graduating from the latter in 1982. As an attorney, she served as a general counsel and worked in several private practices.

== Los Angeles City Attorney ==
In 2021, Feldstein Soto announced her candidacy for Los Angeles City Attorney. She was endorsed by the Los Angeles Times. She prevailed in the general election, becoming the first female City Attorney in L.A. history, and the first Latina elected to citywide office in Los Angeles.

=== Tenure ===
During her tenure as City Attorney, Feldstein Soto pursued a range of enforcement actions including anti-trafficking efforts, gun safety litigation, and wage theft enforcement. Her time in office has also been marked by sustained controversy, including claims of retaliation against whistleblowers in her office, criticism of her litigation strategy contributing to a sharp rise in city liability payouts, her obstruction of an affordable housing project in Venice, and a significant data breach involving confidential legal records. Several of her decisions drew public criticsm from legal experts, including a memo during Los Angeles' "hot labor summer", advising elected city councilmembers not to join picket lines. Several experts, including former chair of the National Labor Relations Board William B. Gould IV dismissed the advice as meritless, with one critic saying the memo was "based on an extreme and unsupported mischaracterization of federal labor law."

==== Liability payouts and litigation ====
Between 2022, before Soto took office, and 2025, liability payments by the city of Los Angeles, which settle claims and lawsuits against the city for wrongdoing, increased to a projected $320 million, more than three and a half times the budgeted $87 million, which had been the budget for the previous eight years. The Los Angeles Times reported that these legal settlements contributed significantly to the city's FY2025 budget crisis, and reported that Soto's office took a "combative stance" against plaintiffs that contributed to this increase in payouts. The Times cited multiple plaintiffs attorneys who asserted that Soto's office is taking more cases to trial, resulting in larger verdicts than if she settled. One attorney "said he recently went to trial in five cases and won all of them, for a total payout of more than $40 million," but said he "would have been happy to settle all five cases for a total of less than $10 million." The City Attorney's office has argued that its litigation strategy has also recovered significant funds for the city, including a $35 million environmental settlement against agribusiness company Monsanto, a $5 million settlement against ghost gun manufacturer Polymer80, a $7.7 million environmental settlement against Verizon, a $500,000 settlement against an online media company illegally harvesting data regarding minors and a $350,000 tobacco enforcement settlement against flavored products targeting kids.

On August 15, 2023, Feldstein Soto announced her office had filed a lawsuit against a company, Nightfall Group, that offers luxury party houses for short term rentals saying that they violate city laws and create a public nuisance. Feldstein Soto said that police have been called more than 250 times in the last two years because of problems at houses that the business rents out in the Hollywood area. In September 2025, Feldstein Soto expanded enforcement against illegal short-term rentals and party houses in Hollywood, with violators facing increased fines.

==== Accusations of ethical breaches and retaliation ====
In June 2024, Michelle McGinnis, a former prosecutor in the City Attorney's office, filed a legal claim alleging that Feldstein Soto retaliated against her for reporting "legal and ethical violations." McGinnis claimed that Feldstein Soto based some of the office's decisions on prosecutions on "personal relationships" or "perceived political gain," including telling employees she wanted to stop prosecuting corporate defendants and singling out an individual protestor for prosecution. McGinnis reported that after objecting to these decisions, she was “subjected to a series of adverse employment actions and ultimately placed on administrative leave, removed from the office, and prohibited from further contact with office colleagues and employees." In her sworn declaration, McGinnis stated that Feldstein Soto “frequently consumed alcohol in the office with senior staff” and once referred to a Latino employee as a “fake Latino". In July, another employee claimed that Feldstein Soto routinely read her employees' emails without their knowledge, and two more former employees filed retaliation claims. McGinnis was formally sent a notice of termination in January 2025. In September 2025, a superior court judge dismissed the city attorney office's motion to dismiss the suit.

In August 2025, Feldstein Soto requested $500,000 from the City of Los Angeles to fund a legal response to the claims. However, the City Council only authorized $50,000.

In May 2026, LAist reported that Feldstein Soto ordered prosecutors to drop rent price gouging cases "showing not just probable cause, but a high likelihood of conviction by a jury at trial... in light of the fact that we have confirmed that the parties involved are campaign donors." In emails obtained by the publication, a supervising attorney, claimed that "a pattern has now emerged of the City Attorney's personal interest in protecting her donors."

LAPD data breach

In April 2026, Feldstein Soto's office disclosed that their office had unintentionally leaked 7.7 terabytes of information, including thousands of confidential Los Angeles Police Department disciplinary records, by putting them on a filesharing system run out of the attorney's office that was not password protected. On April 10, the Los Angeles Police Protective League (LAPPL) formally rescinded their endorsement of Feldstein Soto for the 2026 Los Angeles elections, stating that she was “repeatedly not forthcoming” about the breach, which was internally discovered on March 20 but was not disclosed to the public or the LAPPL until April 8. Notably, Feldstein Soto met with LAPPL leadership to discuss and receive their endorsement on March 25. Councilmember Ysabel Jurado also criticized Feldstein Soto, stating that she had "failed to provide timely transparency to the Council and the public."

==== LAPD officer photographs and public records ====
Under Feldstein Soto's leadership, her office sued journalist Ben Camacho and the Stop LAPD Spying Coalition, a local advocacy organization, to return a flash drive containing photographs of LAPD officers. The City of Los Angeles had given Camacho the pictures in response to a public records request, and the Stop LAPD Spying Coalition subsequently published them on the website WatchTheWatchers.net as well as for download on the Internet Archive A coalition of media organizations denounced the lawsuit as limiting the freedom of the press. Constitutional scholar Erwin Chemerinsky commented that "the city is on very weak legal grounds". In June 2024, The city of Los Angeles agreed to pay $300,000 in a tentative settlement to Knock LA journalist Ben Camacho and the group Stop LAPD Spying Coalition for their legal fees.

==== Weakening of California Public Records Act ====
Following the LAPD picture release, Feldstein Soto suggested to several California state legislators to weaken the California Public Records Act of 1968 by exempting "images or data that may personally identify an individual". Feldstein Soto's office stated that the proposed legislation was intended to protect the safety of public employees, particularly law enforcement officers, whose personal identifying information had been inadvertently released. The ACLU described Feldstein Soto's proposal as a "gutting" of the California Public Records Act.

Gaza protest prosecutions

In March 2024, the Los Angeles Police Department raised concerns to the attorney's office that Feldstein Soto pushed the department to press charges against a specific individual without sufficient evidence, following a particular Los Angeles action in Gaza war protests. An internal city hall memo recounted that "for reasons unknown, the City Attorney expressed inordinate interest in the progress of a mass protest investigation, going so far as to suggest the identification of a specific individual for prosecution to the Chief of Police". In April 2025, a judge found evidence of "biased prosecution" by Feldstein Soto in her decision to seek charges for thirty-one pro-Palestine protesters who were arrested for blocking traffic in December 2023, despite such prosecutions being extraordinarily rare in Los Angeles. In June 2025, the City Attorney's office filed misdemeanor charges against participants in a separate downtown Los Angeles protest, which Feldstein Soto's office noted as arising from criminal conduct during demonstrations.

==== Opposition to affordable housing ====
While running for office, Feldstein Soto opposed the construction of 140 units of affordable housing in Venice, an affluent neighborhood of L.A. In 2023, the Los Angeles Times reported that Feldstein Soto had instructed city agencies to not interact with the developers of the project on city-owned parking lot in Venice. The project had previously been approved by the City Council and survived multiple lawsuits, but Feldstein Soto's actions delayed its progress.

In July 2024, advocates for low-income housing sued the city of Los Angeles, accusing Feldstein Soto of violating fair housing laws by blocking the housing development in Venice. The Los Angeles Times editorial board criticized Feldstein Soto for derailing the housing development.

In 2025, Feldstein Soto sent a letter to a state senator expressing her opposition to Senate Bill 79 which allows six-story buildings near light rail stations and rapid bus stops. She argued that more housing would increase local tax burdens. In 2025 and 2026, Feldstein Soto's office filed lawsuits against multiple landlords for alleged illegal rent increases and fee violations targeting tenants displaced by the January 2025 wildfires.

==== Skid Row Housing Trust ====
In March 2023, Feldstein Soto asked a court to appoint Mark Adams as a receiver for the Skid Row Housing Trust, which holds a collection of 29 buildings home to 1,500 formerly unhoused people. Feldstein Soto described Adams as "the most experienced health and safety receiver we were able to locate in the state of California". A Los Angeles Times review of Adams's record showed that he had a history of overbilling local governments, failing to maintain the conditions of his properties and putting vulnerable tenants at risk of eviction and homelessness. In June 2023, after scrutiny from the Times and other city officials, Feldstein Soto's office reported to the Los Angeles City Council that Adams had misrepresented his fundraising ability, shown little progress in improving conditions for tenants, failed to provide required spending reports, and that his property management company had issued hundreds of illegal eviction notices to residents. In June, Los Angeles City Council authorized a $10 million emergency loan to stabilize the trust on the condition that Adams resign. Two weeks later, the Los Angeles Times revealed that Adams had hosted a fundraiser for Feldstein Soto during her 2022 election campaign.

==== Wildfire price gouging ====
In the weeks following the January 2025 Southern California wildfires, which impacted Los Angeles county, the City Attorney's office received approximately 900 price-gouging complaints and redeployed staff from every division to investigate allegations of landlords violating post-disaster pricing rules. On February 3, 2025, the office filed its first major enforcement action against Blueground US Inc, a New York-based venture capital-backed furnished apartment company accused of raising rents by 20 to 56 percent within days of the fires. In March 2025, Feldstein Soto filed a $62 million lawsuit against a group of property owners accused of operating an illegal short-term rental scheme that exploited residents displaced by the wildfires.

In January 2026, an independent report found that the office investigated less than 10% of referred complaints, and filed only five cases, recovering less than 5% of the estimate $29 million in rent gouged by landlords and corporations. In February 2026, the City Attorney's office filed an additional lawsuit against one major landlord for alleged illegal rent hikes and tenant fee violations in the aftermath of the wildfires, accusing them of ignoring the wildfire rent cap.

In May 2026, emails from senior prosecutors in Feldstein Soto's office were obtained describing "improper and unethical" decisions by Feldstein Soto to drop wildfire-related price-gouging cases against individuals who were campaign donors to Feldstein Soto's campaign.

In July 2025, Feldstein Soto filed a lawsuit against vacation rental marketplace Airbnb, alleging the platform facilitated price gouging on more than 2,000 rental listings in violation of California's price gouging laws. The complaint alleged that Airbnb allowed hosts to increase prices beyond legally permitted limits during a declared state of emergency and permitted misleading listings.

==== Gun safety, wage theft, and enforcement actions ====
Feldstein Soto announced a settlement in her office's lawsuit against Polymer80, the nation's largest manufacturer of weapons parts kits and components, permanently prohibiting the company from selling its weapons parts kits its in California without first conducting background checks of buyers and serializing its products. In addition, the company and its founders were ordered to pay $5 million in civil penalties. The lawsuit had been filed in February 2021, almost two years before Feldstein Soto took office, and was prosecuted by staff who predated Feldstein Soto's election along with Everytown Law and Quinn Emanuel Urquhart & Sullivan.

At the start of Labor Day weekend, on September 1, 2023, Feldstein Soto joined council members Hugo Soto-Martínez and Tim McOsker to unveil new legislation to strengthen the enforcement of wage theft violations.

In November 2025, Feldstein Soto joined a multi-city coalition of city attorneys working to safeguard Supplemental Nutrition Assistance Program (SNAP) benefits. In December 2025, the City Attorney's office received a $1.3 million grant from the California Office of Traffic Safety to prosecute impaired drivers.

In January 2026, Feldstein Soto announced a $7.7 million settlement in a statewide environmental protection suit against telecommunications company Verizon. In October 2025, her office settled a lawsuit against the owners of a nine-location tobacco retail chain for $350,000 in civil penalties after the stores were found to have sold flavored tobacco products, which were banned in California in 2002, we well as tobacco to minors in violation of state and city law.

On September 12, 2023, Feldstein Soto announced that the City Attorney's Office had filed a lawsuit against the owners and operator of a motel in South Los Angeles that has served as a "hub for prostitution" for several years.

In January 2026, Feldstein Soto and Los Angeles County District Attorney Nathan Hochman announced the Western Avenue Initiative, a joint city-county effort to combat sex trafficking along Western Avenue between Olympic and Santa Monica Boulevards. The initiative shifted enforcement focus from prosecuting trafficking victims to targeting sex buyers, traffickers and profiteers, with the City Attorney's office partnering with the District Attorney to pursue state prison sentences for sex buyers. The effort followed earlier enforcement along the Figueroa Corridor in South Los Angeles, where the City Attorney's office reported arresting 72 sexual predators. Feldstein Soto and Hochman also co-sponsored Assembly Bill 535, called "the Victim and Witness Protection Act," which was signed into California law in 2025 and strengthened protections for survivors of domestic violence, human trafficking, and sex crimes against witness intimidation and retaliation. Feldstein Soto sponsored and California State Senator Susan Rubio authored California Senate Bill 680 to close a loophole in the law requiring mandatory sex registration for those who molest minors, which was signed into law in 2025 and became effective January 1, 2026.

==== Child sexual abuse prosecutions ====
In April 2025, a jury convicted former UCLA preschool teacher Christopher Rodriguez on nine counts of child sexual abuse, including sexual battery and penetration with a foreign object, involving 3- and 4-year-old children at UCLA early care and education centers. According to an announcement by Feldstein Soto, Rodriguez faced up to seven and a half years in county jail and was required to register as a sex offender. In January 2026, Feldstein Soto secured a 12-and-a-half-year sentence against Jacinto Mendez for sexual abuse of an underaged female relative, which Feldstein Soto called "one of the longest sentences" her office had ever obtained.

Legal offices
Preceded by Mike Feuer	City Attorney of Los Angeles; 2022–present	Incumbent
