= Abdul Rahman al-Amoudi =

American Muslim activist

Abdul Rahman Al-Amoudi
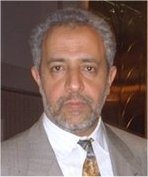
- Abdul Rahman Al-Amoudi in 1995
- Born: Ethiopia
- Occupations: Lobbyist and fundraiser
- Status: USA
- Convictions: Illegal financial transactions with Libyan government, unlawful procurement of citizenship, impeding administration of Internal Revenue Service, and role in Libyan conspiracy to assassinate Saudi; Crown Prince Abdullah (October 2004)
- Criminal charges: Illegal financial transactions with Libyan government, unlawful procurement of citizenship, impeding administration of Internal Revenue Service, and role in Libyan conspiracy to assassinate Saudi Crown Prince Abdullah
- Penalty: 23-year prison sentence

Abdul Rahman Al-Amoudi (/ɑːbˈduːl rɑːˈmɑːn ɑːlɑːˈmuːdiː/), better known as Abdurahman Alamoudi, is a former American Muslim activist known for founding the American Muslim Council. He pleaded guilty to financial and conspiracy charges in 2004, which resulted in a 23-year prison sentence.

== Biography ==
Al-Amoudi was born in the Province of Eritrea in Ethiopia.

He moved from Yemen to the United States in 1979, and became a U.S. citizen in 1996. Al-Amoudi was automatically stripped of this citizenship by the U.S. after his conviction on terrorism-related charges.

Al-Amoudi lived in Falls Church, Virginia.

== Organizations ==
According to The Washington Post, before his arrest and guilty plea, was Alamoudi was "one of America's best-known Muslim activists" and "met with senior Clinton and Bush administration officials in his efforts to bolster Muslim political prominence." Al-Amoudi founded and was the executive director of the American Muslim Foundation and "was an influential member of other Islamic political and charitable organizations." Al-Amoudi also played a role in establishing a U.S. Department of Defense Muslim chaplain program. Alamoudi met with President George W. Bush and contributed $1,000 to his campaign; Al-Amoudi donated the same amount to the U.S. Senate campaign of Hillary Clinton. Both Bush and Clinton later returned the money. Al-Amoudi was invited by the Bush White House to speak at a Washington National Cathedral prayer service in memory of victims of the September 11, 2001 attacks.

Al-Amoudi was a founder of the Islamic Society of Boston (ISB). He signed the Society's articles of incorporation and served as the first president of the Society's Cambridge, Massachusetts mosque, which was also attended by the Boston Marathon bombers (Dzhokhar Tsarnaev and his brother, Tamerlan Tsarnaev), as well as by convicted terrorists Aafia Siddiqui and Tarek Mehanna.

== Controversial statements ==
During an interview with a Middle East television channel in March 1997, Al-Amoudi declared: "I really consider him (Hamas deputy political leader Mousa Abu Marzook) to be from among the best people in the Islamic movement," and added that he worked with Marzook and Hamas.

In a phone call intercepted by a U.S. Immigration and Customs Enforcement agent and recounted in a court affidavit, Alamoudi lamented that the 1998 U.S. embassy bombings in Africa did not kill any Americans and suggested that more attacks should be carried out similar to the 1994 Jewish cultural center bombing in Buenos Aires.

In their PBS documentary miniseries America at a Crossroads, Newsweek journalists Mark Hosenball and Michael Isikoff report that Al-Amoudi was "an influential [Muslim] Brotherhood supporter described as an 'expert in the art of deception' by an FBI insider" for expressing moderate, pro-American sympathies in his lobbying and public relations work with Americans, but then expressing support for Hamas and Hezbollah at an Islamist rally.

== Crown Prince Abdullah assassination plot and conviction on U.S. federal criminal charges ==
Alamoudi was indicted in 2003 in the United States District Court for the Eastern District of Virginia for illegal dealings with Libya that included his involvement in a complex and "bizarre" plot, financed by the Libyan leader Muammar Qaddafi, to have then-Saudi Crown Prince Abdullah killed by two Britain-based al-Qaeda operatives. Alamoudi was arrested in September 2003 at Dulles International Airport after arriving on a flight from London. He was charged with accepting $10,700 from the Libyan Mission to the United Nations while Libya was listed as one of the seven state sponsors of terrorism. Alamoudi admitted "that he pocketed nearly $1 million and used it to pay conspirators in the plot, which sources said came close to succeeding before it was broken up by Saudi intelligence officials."

On July 30, 2004, Alamoudi pleaded guilty to three federal criminal charges: "one count of violating the International Emergency Economic Powers Act (IEEPA), which imposes terrorism-related sanctions prohibiting unlicensed travel to and commerce with Libya; one count of false statements made in his application for naturalization; and a tax offense involving a long-term scheme to conceal from the IRS his financial transactions with Libya and his foreign bank accounts and to omit material information from the tax returns filed by his charities."

He agreed to cooperate in ongoing investigations in return for prosecutors dropping 31 other counts and possible reduction in a pending 23-year sentence and $750,000 in fines.

U.S. District Judge Claude M. Hilton sentenced Alamoudi to 276 months (23 years) in prison in October 2004, the maximum sentence. For his immigration fraud, Alamoudi was also stripped of his citizenship.

The September 2003 affidavit against Alamoudi also alleged that his money not only went to al Qaeda, but also to Palestinian Islamic Jihad (PIJ). In addition, the affidavit states that he was granted power of attorney for 22 family members of people detained in Guantanamo Bay, Cuba for suspicion of ties to Al Qaeda.

The U.S. Department of the Treasury cited Alamoudi on the occasion of the July 2005 terrorist designation of the Movement for Islamic Reform in Arabia as providing support to al-Qaeda.
