= Los Angeles City Clerk =

Overview and background of current municipal officer

Los Angeles City Clerk is in charge of record keeping for the city and elections. Mayor Eric Garcetti appointed the current City Clerk, Holly L. Wolcott, on August 13, 2014. Wolcott has a long record of service to the City of Los Angeles, having served in the City Clerk's office before working in the Fire Department, Department of Aging, Police Department and Office of the Chief Legislative Analyst. She returned to the Office of the City Clerk as the Chief of Administrative Services in 2004, become the Executive Officer in 2008, and has served under the administrations of Mayors Tom Bradley, Richard Riordan, James Hahn and Antonio Villaraigosa. Wolcott was preceded by June Lagmay (2009-2013), Frank Martinez (2004–2008), and J. Michael Carey (1997–2005).
