= American Muslim Council =

Islamic organization based on Chicago, Illinois, United States

- Abbreviation: AMC
- Formation: 1990
- Dissolved: 2003

The American Muslim Council (AMC) was an Islamic organization and registered charity in the United States.

== History ==
The organization was founded in 1990 by Abdul Rahman al-Amoudi with the support of the Muslim Brotherhood. Al-Amoudi formerly led the Islamic Society of Boston.

AMC took part in the defense of South Florida Professor and Palestinian Islamic Jihad leader Sami Al-Arian and questioned the US government's allegation that the professor took part in terrorist activities. AMC produced a pamphlet in which it said that "the FBI has a history of harassing and harming minority and immigrant communities". On March 2, 2006, Al-Arian entered a guilty plea to a charge of conspiracy to help the Palestinian Islamic Jihad, a "specially designated terrorist" organization. Al-Arian was sentenced to 57 months in prison, and ordered deported following his prison term.

AMC was also a member of the American Muslim Political Coordination Council (AMPCC), along with the American Muslim Alliance (AMA), Council on American-Islamic Relations (CAIR), and Muslim Public Affairs Council (MPAC). AMPCC's primary concern is to coordinate the member organizations on activism and lobbying.

The AMC went defunct in 2003. A separate, more moderate organization operating under the same name later began operations out of Chicago, Illinois.
