= Karen Bass =

Mayor of Los Angeles since 2022

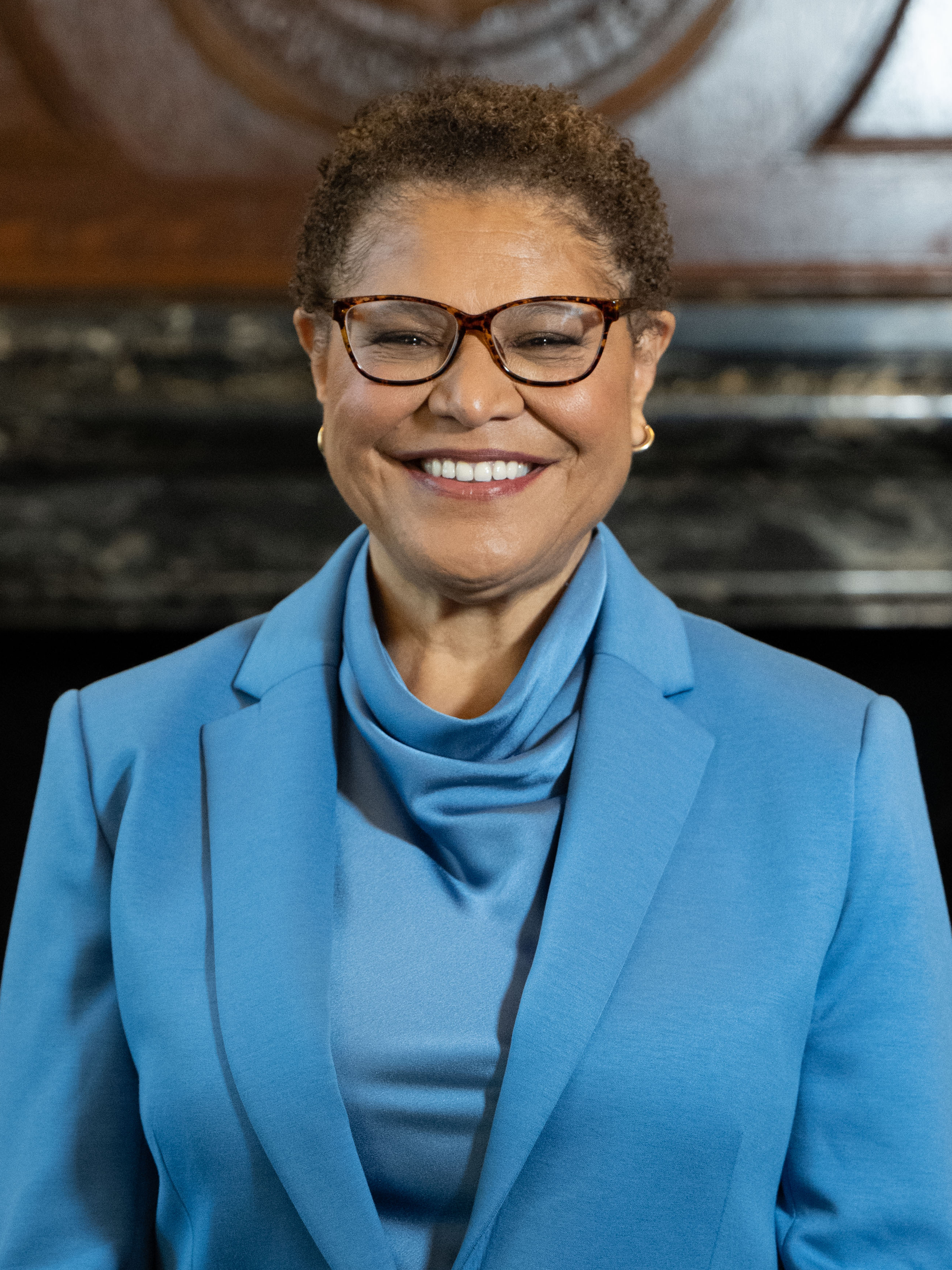
- Official portrait, 2023

43rd Mayor of Los Angeles
- Incumbent
- Assumed office December 12, 2022
- Preceded by: Eric Garcetti

Chair of the Congressional Black Caucus
- In office January 3, 2019 – January 3, 2021
- Preceded by: Cedric Richmond
- Succeeded by: Joyce Beatty

Member of the U.S. House of Representatives from California
- In office January 3, 2011 – December 9, 2022
- Preceded by: Diane Watson
- Succeeded by: Sydney Kamlager-Dove
- Constituency: 33rd district (2011–2013); 37th district (2013–2022)

67th Speaker of the California State Assembly
- In office May 13, 2008 – March 1, 2010
- Preceded by: Fabian Núñez
- Succeeded by: John Pérez

Majority Leader of the California Assembly
- In office December 4, 2006 – May 13, 2008
- Preceded by: Dario Frommer
- Succeeded by: Alberto Torrico

Member of the California State Assembly from the 47th district
- In office December 6, 2004 – December 6, 2010
- Preceded by: Herb Wesson
- Succeeded by: Holly Mitchell

Personal details
- Born: Karen Ruth Bass; October 3, 1953 (age 73) Los Angeles, California, U.S.
- Party: Democratic
- Spouse: Jesus Lechuga (m. 1980; div. 1986)
- Children: 5, including 4 stepchildren
- Education: San Diego State University (attended); California State University, Dominguez Hills (BS); University of Southern California (MPAP, MSW)

Karen Ruth Bass (/bæs/; born October 3, 1953) is an American politician who has served as the 43rd mayor of Los Angeles since 2022. A member of the Democratic Party, Bass previously served in the U.S. House of Representatives from 2011 to 2022 and in the California State Assembly from 2004 to 2010, serving as speaker during her final term.

After attending San Diego State University and California State University, Dominguez Hills, Bass worked as a physician assistant and community organizer before being elected to represent California's 47th State Assembly district in 2004. In 2008, she was elected to serve as the 67th speaker of the California State Assembly, becoming the first African American woman in U.S. history to serve as speaker of a state legislative body.

Bass was first elected to the U.S. House of Representatives in 2010. She represented California's 33rd congressional district during her first term; redistribution of districts moved her to 37th district in 2012. She chaired the Congressional Black Caucus during the 116th Congress. After winning the 2022 Los Angeles mayoral election, Bass became the first woman to serve as mayor of Los Angeles. On November 5, 2026, she lost her bid for reelection to progressive City Councilwoman Nithya Raman.

== Early life and education ==
Bass was born in Los Angeles, California, the daughter of Wilhelmina (née Duckett) and DeWitt Talmadge Bass. Her father was a postman, and her mother was a homemaker. She was raised in the Venice and Fairfax neighborhoods of Los Angeles and graduated from Alexander Hamilton High School in 1971.

Witnessing the civil rights movement on television as a child, with her father, sparked her interest in community activism. While in middle school, Bass began volunteering for Robert Kennedy's presidential campaign. In the mid-1970s, she was an organizer of the Venceremos Brigade, a pro–Cuban Revolution group that organized trips by Americans to Cuba. She visited Cuba eight times in the 1970s.

Bass studied philosophy at San Diego State University from 1971 to 1973 and graduated from the physician assistant program of the USC Keck School of Medicine in 1982. She then earned a Bachelor of Science with a major in health sciences from California State University, Dominguez Hills, in 1990.

In the 1980s, she worked as an emergency medicine physician assistant and a clinical instructor at the physician assistant program at the USC Keck School of Medicine. In the late 1980s, Bass and other local community organizers founded Community Coalition, a South Los Angeles grassroots organization.

While serving as a member of the United States House of Representatives from California, Bass received a Master of Social Work from the USC Suzanne Dworak-Peck School of Social Work in 2015.

== California State Assembly ==
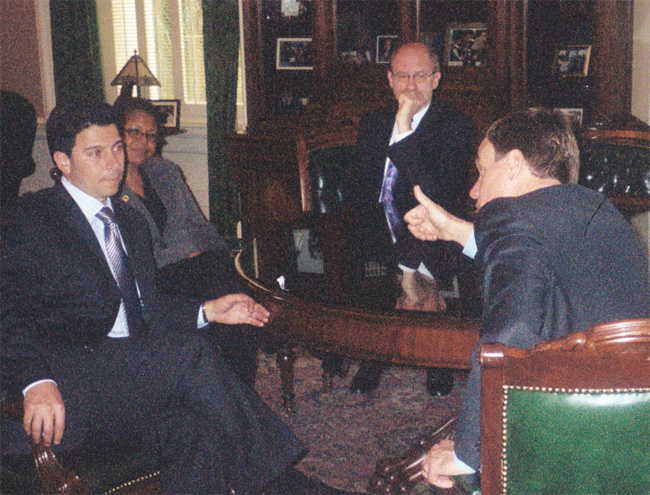
Bass, behind Assembly Speaker Fabian Núñez (left), with John Laird while speaking to Virginia Governor Mark Warner in 2007

In 2004, Bass was elected to represent California's 47th Assembly district. At her inauguration, she became the only African-American woman serving in the state legislature. She was reelected in 2006 and 2008 before her term limit expired. Bass served the cities and communities of Culver City, West Los Angeles, Westwood, Cheviot Hills, Leimert Park, Baldwin Hills, View Park-Windsor Hills, Ladera Heights, the Crenshaw District, Little Ethiopia and portions of Koreatown and South Los Angeles.

Speaker Fabian Núñez appointed Bass California State Assembly majority whip for the 2005–06 legislative session and majority floor leader for the 2007–08 legislative session. During her term as majority whip, Bass was vice chair of the Legislative Black Caucus. As vice chair, she commissioned the first ever "State of Black California" report.

=== Speakership ===
Núñez termed out of the Assembly at the end of the 2007–08 session, leaving Bass as the next-highest-ranking Democrat in the Assembly. After consolidating the support of a majority of legislators, including some who had previously been planning to run for the speakership themselves, Bass was elected speaker on February 28, 2008, and sworn in on May 13, 2008.

As speaker, Bass promoted numerous laws to improve the state's child welfare system. During her first year, she ushered through expansion of Healthy Families Insurance Coverage to prevent children from going without health insurance and worked to eliminate bureaucratic impediments to the certification of small businesses. She also secured more than $2.3 million to help revitalize the historic Vision Theater in Los Angeles and more than $600 million for Los Angeles Unified School District. Bass worked with the governor and initiated the California Commission on the 21st-Century Economy to reform California's tax code. She also fought to repeal the California Citizens Redistricting Commission.

=== California budget crisis (2008–2010) ===
Bass became speaker during a period of severe economic turmoil. Negotiations over a spending plan to address a multi-billion dollar budget shortfall began the day Bass was sworn in. She was part of the negotiations that resulted in a comprehensive deal to close most of a $42 billion shortfall.

In June 2009, Bass drew criticism from conservative commentators for statements she made during an interview with Los Angeles Times reporter Patt Morrison in response to a question about how conservative talk radio affected the Assembly's efforts to pass a state budget. Referencing the condemnation from conservative talk radio hosts that three Republicans experienced after they voted for a Democrat-sponsored plan to create revenue by raising taxes, Bass described the pressures Republican lawmakers face:

The Republicans were essentially threatened and terrorized against voting for revenue. Now [some] are facing recalls. They operate under a terrorist threat: "You vote for revenue and your career is over." I don't know why we allow that kind of terrorism to exist. I guess it's about free speech, but it's extremely unfair.

Bass, Dave Cogdill, Darrell Steinberg, and Michael Villines received the 2010 Profile in Courage Award for their leadership in the budget negotiations and their efforts to address the severe financial crisis.

== U.S. House of Representatives ==
=== Elections ===
==== 2010 ====
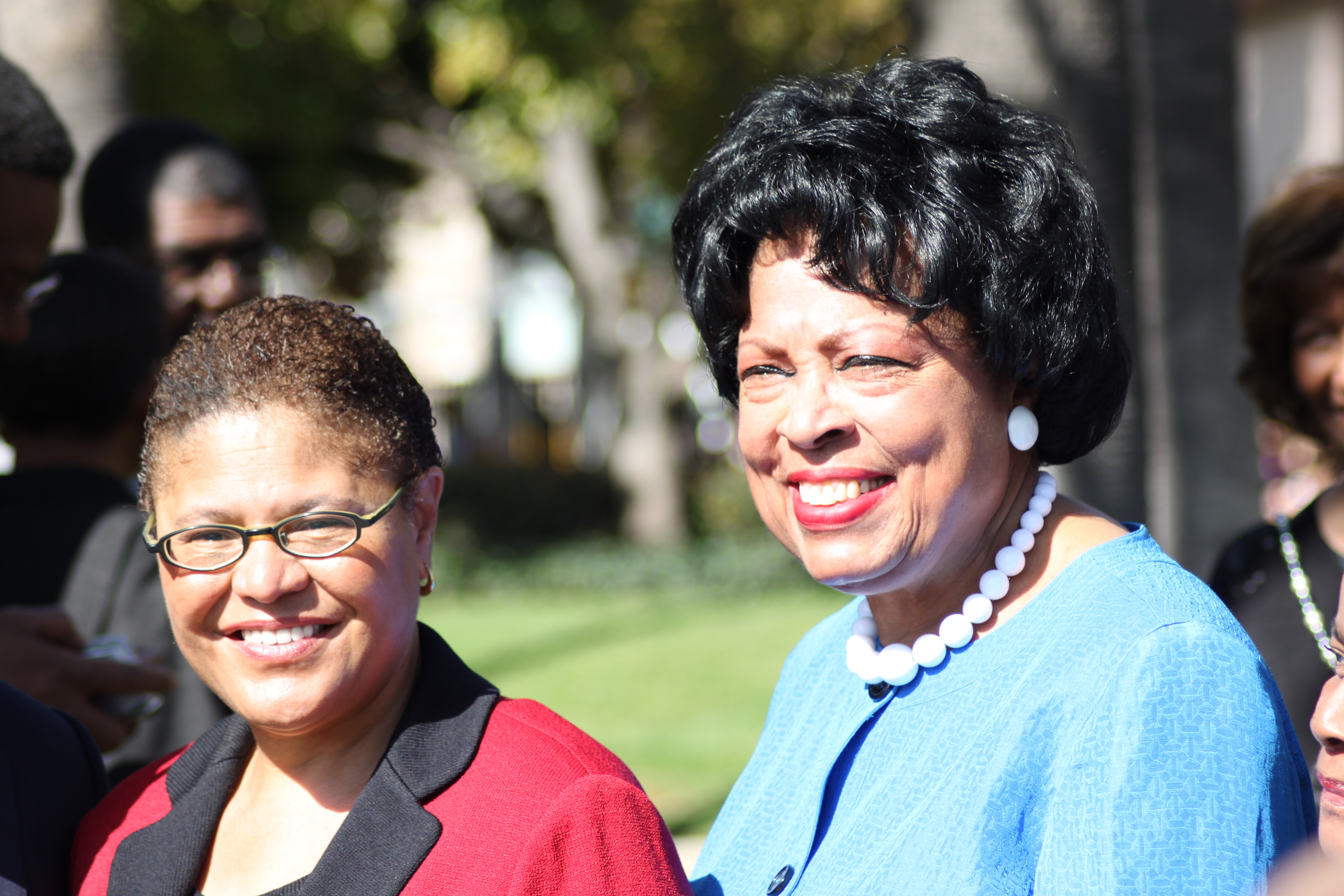
Karen Bass with Diane Watson on the day Bass announced she would run for Congress in 2010

In 2010, Representative Diane Watson retired from Congress and encouraged Bass to run for her seat. Bass was ineligible to run for reelection to the State Assembly in 2010 due to California's term limits, so on February 18, 2010, Bass confirmed her candidacy to represent California's 33rd congressional district.

Bass raised $932,281.19 and spent $768,918.65. Her 2010 campaign contributions came from diverse groups, with none donating more than 15% of her total campaign funds. The five major donors to her campaign were labor unions, with $101,950; financial institutions, with $90,350; health professionals, with $87,900; the entertainment industry, with $52,400; and lawyers and law firms, with $48,650.

Bass won the election with over 86% of the vote on November 2, 2010.

==== 2012 ====
In redistricting following the 2010 census, the district was renumbered from 33rd to 37th. In 2012 she had no primary opponent and won the general election with 86% of the vote. She raised $692,988.53 and spent $803,966.15, leaving $52,384.92 on hand and a debt of $3,297.59.

Bass was involved in President Barack Obama's reelection campaign. She played a leadership role in the California African Americans for Obama organization and served on Obama's national African American Leadership Council. Bass had also served as a co-chair of African Americans for Obama in California during the 2008 presidential campaign.

==== 2014 ====
Bass was reelected to a third term with 84.3% of the vote.

==== 2016 ====
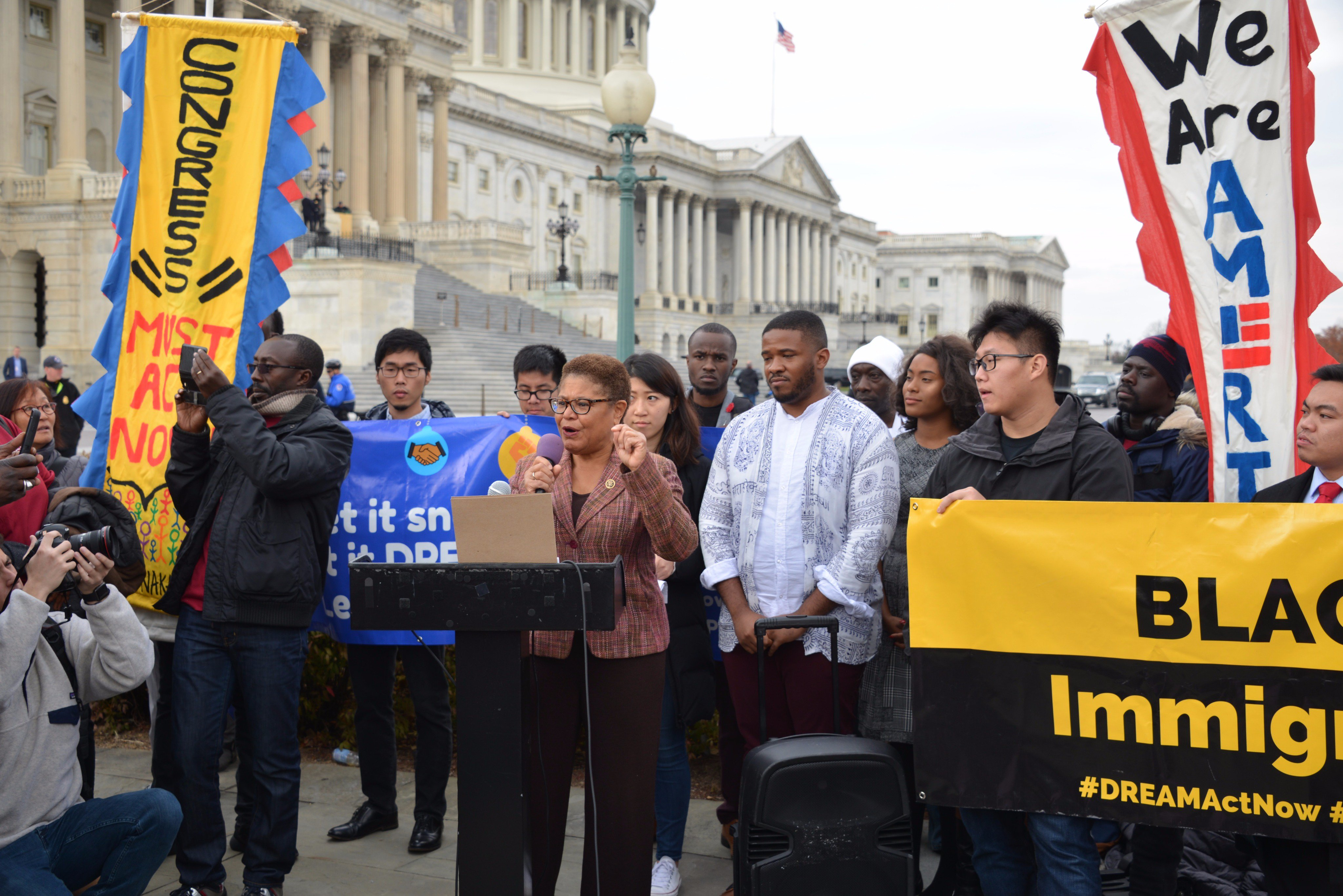
Bass speaking in support of DREAMers in December 2017

Bass was reelected to a fourth term with 81.1% of the vote. She endorsed Hillary Clinton for president in 2015. On August 3, 2016, Bass launched a petition to have then-candidate Donald Trump psychologically evaluated, suggesting that he exhibited symptoms of narcissistic personality disorder (NPD). The petition was signed by 37,218 supporters. She did not attend President Trump's inauguration after conducting a poll on Twitter.

==== 2018 ====
Fueled by Trump's election and to channel Angelenos' political frustrations, Bass created the Sea Change Leadership PAC to activate, educate, and mobilize voters. She won her primary with 89.18% of the vote and was reelected to a fifth term with 88.2% of the vote.

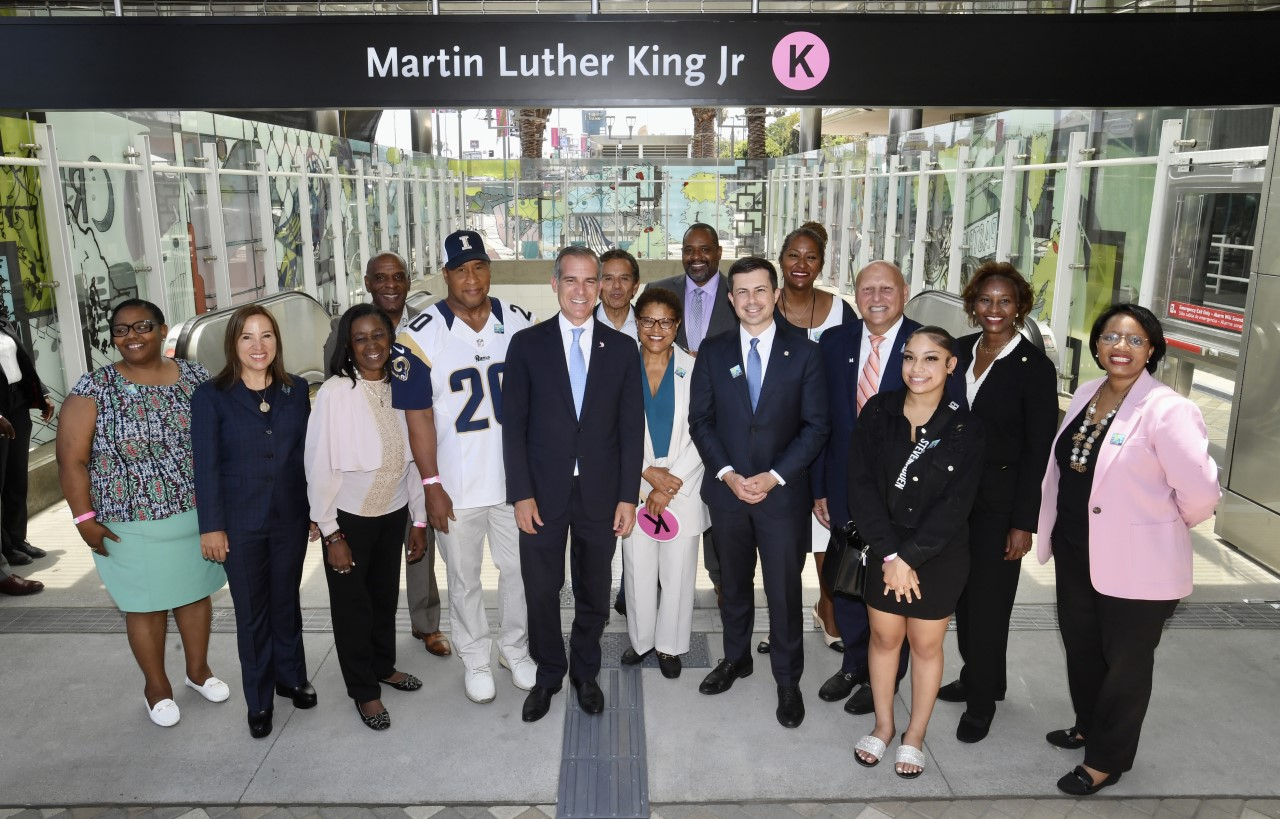
Bass with Eric Garcetti, Antonio Villaraigosa and Pete Buttigieg at the Martin Luther King Jr. station in Los Angeles, July 8, 2022

After the 2018 elections, Democrats regained the majority in the House of Representatives. Representative Seth Moulton and others who felt the current leadership was "too old" gathered signatures to replace Nancy Pelosi as the Democrats' leader. Bass was their first choice for leader, but she rejected the offer, supporting Pelosi for speaker. On November 28, 2018, Pelosi won the speakership on a 203-to-32 vote.

==== 2020 ====
Bass won her primary with 88.1% of the vote and was reelected to a sixth term with 85.9% of the vote.

=== Committee assignments ===
- Committee on the Judiciary
  - Subcommittee on Crime, Terrorism, Homeland Security and Investigations (chair)
  - Subcommittee on Courts, Intellectual Property and the Internet
- Committee on Foreign Affairs
  - Subcommittee on Africa, Global Health, and Human Rights (chair)

=== Caucus memberships ===
- Congressional Black Caucus (chair; 2019–2021)
- Congressional Caucus on Foster Youth, founder and co-chair
- Congressional Coalition on Adoption (CCA)
- American Sikh Congressional Caucus
- Congressional Addiction, Treatment and Recovery Caucus
- Coalition for Autism Research and Education (CARE)
- Congressional Caucus on Black Men and Boys
- Congressional Creative Rights Caucus
- Congressional Diabetes Caucus
- Congressional Entertainment Industries Caucus
- Congressional Ethiopia Caucus
- Congressional HIV/AIDS Caucus
- Congressional International Conservation Caucus
- Congressional LGBT Equality Caucus
- Congressional Library of Congress Caucus
- Congressional Military Mental Health Caucus
- Congressional Multiple Sclerosis Caucus
- Congressional Quiet Skies Caucus
- Congressional Social Work Caucus
- Congressional Valley Fever Task Force
- Congressional Progressive Caucus
- Medicare for All Caucus

Bass served as the second vice chair of the Congressional Black Caucus during the 115th Congress. She was elected chair of the Congressional Black Caucus on November 28, 2018, and served in that capacity from 2019 to 2021.

== Vice presidential and Biden administration speculation ==
In July 2020, Bass was discussed as a potential running mate for presumptive Democratic presidential nominee Joe Biden. Biden reportedly narrowed the field of possible vice presidential selections to a few women, and Bass "gained real traction in the late stage of the search". Politico called Bass "a bridge-building politician who can draw accolades and concessions from both sides of the aisle".

During this time, a video emerged of Bass speaking at the 2010 opening of the Church of Scientology's headquarters in Los Angeles, outside her district. She praised the Church of Scientology for what she described as the "group's goal [and] commitment" to "make a difference", singling out the words of founder L. Ron Hubbard "that all people of whatever race, color or creed are created with equal rights." In 2020, Bass defended her remarks, tweeting that she had addressed "a group of people with beliefs very different than my own" and "spoke briefly about things I think most of us agree with, and on those things—respect for different views, equality, and fighting oppression—my views have not changed". In addition, Bass tweeted that "[s]ince then, published first-hand accounts in books, interviews and documentaries have exposed [the Church of Scientology]."

Bass was also criticized for a statement she had made in 2016 on the death of Cuban leader Fidel Castro, which she called a "great loss to the people of Cuba". Bass said she had been trying to express her condolences to the Cuban population, but added that "it's certainly something that I would not say again".

When Biden chose Kamala Harris as his running mate, Bass tweeted, "@KamalaHarris is a great choice for Vice President. Her tenacious pursuit of justice and relentless advocacy for the people is what is needed right now."

In November 2020, Biden considered Bass for secretary of Housing and Urban Development and secretary of Health and Human Services. Ultimately, Biden nominated Ohio Representative Marcia Fudge and California Attorney General Xavier Becerra to the posts, respectively.

== Mayor of Los Angeles ==
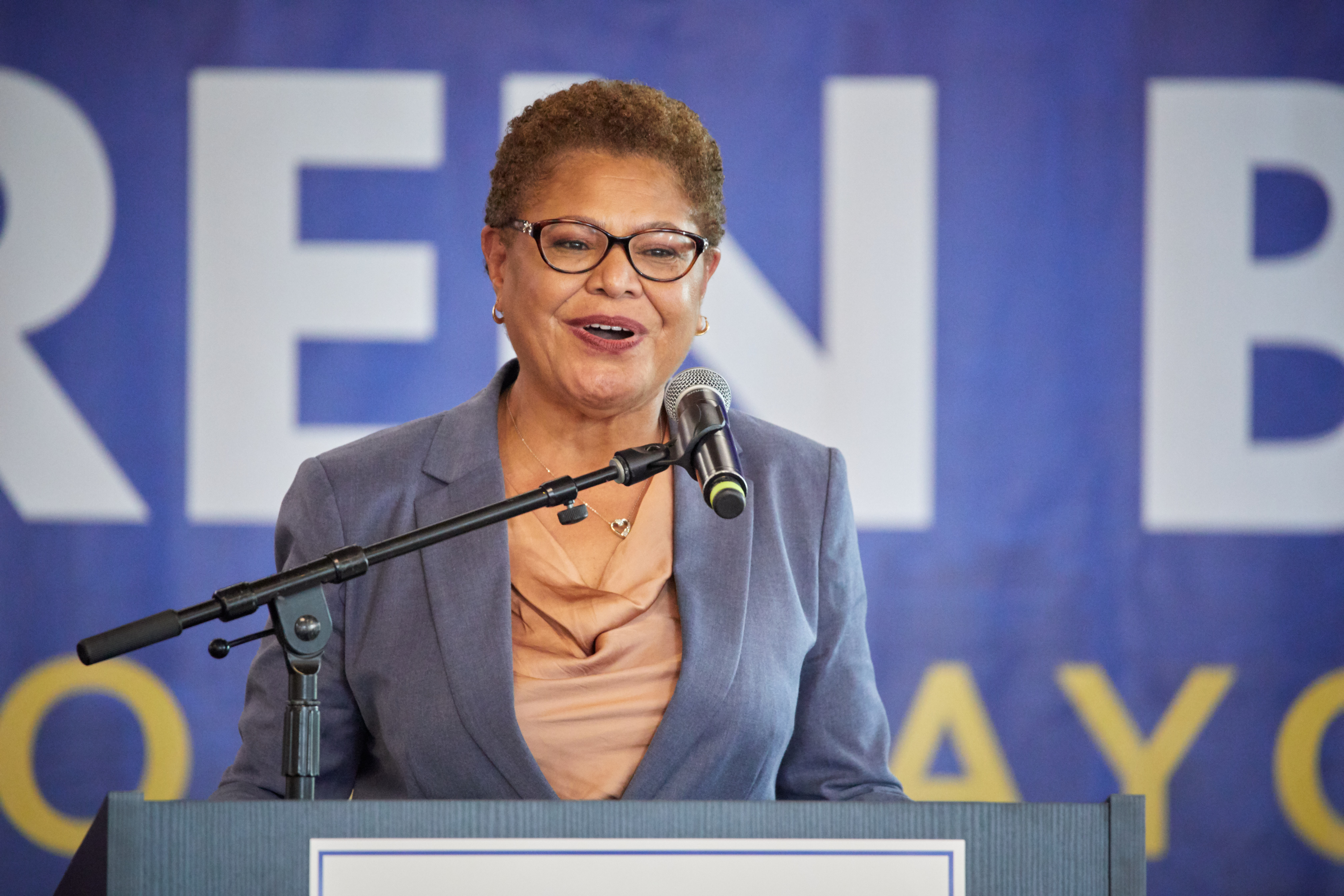
Bass speaking at during her mayoral campaign kickoff in 2021

=== 2022 election ===
On September 27, 2021, Bass announced her candidacy for mayor of Los Angeles in the 2022 election. She was endorsed by then-President Joe Biden, then-Vice President Kamala Harris, Nancy Pelosi, former president Barack Obama, California Governor Gavin Newsom, and the California Democratic Party. Her campaign focused on addressing causes of Los Angeles's homelessness problem and ending homeless encampments around elementary schools and public parks and beaches. During her mayoral campaign, Bass said that she supported more housing in Los Angeles, but opposed changing zoning regulations so that denser housing would be allowed in neighborhoods that mandate single-family housing. At the time, three-quarters of all residentially zoned land in Los Angeles was exclusively zoned for single-family housing.

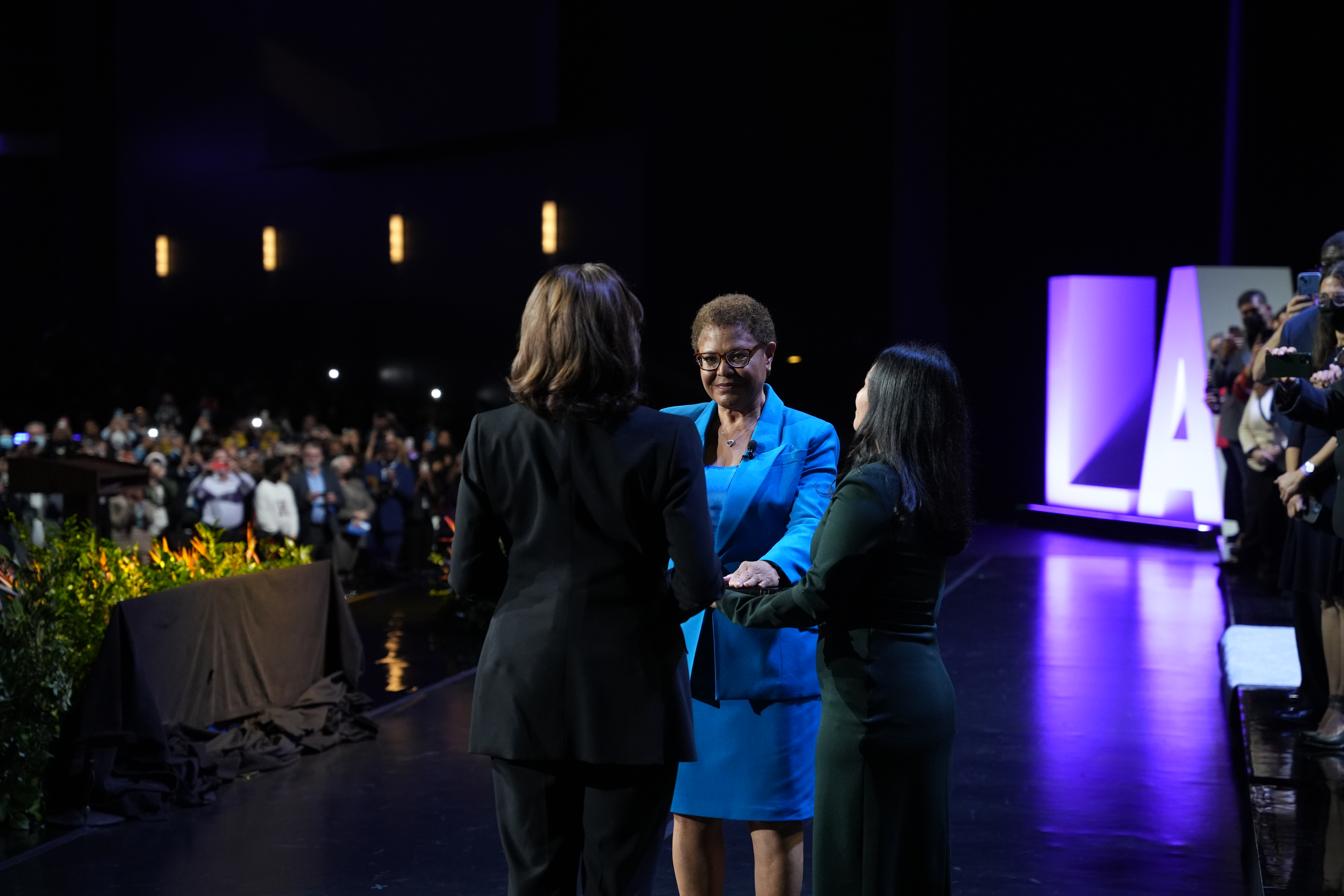
Bass sworn in as mayor of Los Angeles by Vice President Kamala Harris

Bass was the top vote earner in the June 7 primary, and faced Rick Caruso in the November runoff, with the Associated Press declaring her the mayor-elect on November 16.

=== Tenure ===
Bass was officially sworn in by the Los Angeles city clerk on December 10, 2022, succeeding Eric Garcetti. The following day, she was ceremonially sworn in by Vice President Kamala Harris at a public inauguration event. She officially assumed office on December 12. Bass is the first woman and the second Black person, after Tom Bradley, to serve as mayor of Los Angeles.

==== Actions on housing ====
Fulfilling a campaign promise, Bass declared a city state of emergency on homelessness as her first act as mayor. By the end of her first year in office, the Bass Administration said that over 21,000 homeless people had been moved indoors.

In June 2023, Bass signed an order to speed up processing for affordable housing developments in Los Angeles. Later that year, she introduced a change to the order that made affordable housing projects in single-family neighborhoods ineligible for fast-tracking. By one estimate, this reversal put 1,443 potential units of low-income housing in legal limbo. In July 2024, she imposed further restrictions on affordable housing, making them ineligible for fast-tracking in "historic districts" and on lots that already have rent-controlled apartments.

In September 2023, Bass expressed support for tearing down the Marina Freeway and replacing it with housing, but she had reversed her support by October 2023 and expressed opposition to tearing down the freeway.

In July 2024, advocates for low-income housing sued the city of Los Angeles for blocking the construction of 140 units of affordable housing in Venice. The housing advocates faulted Bass for allowing local officials to block the housing rather than direct city officials to advance the project. One of Bass's former staffers said that superiors directed them to stop advancing this project through the city's bureaucracy. The Los Angeles Times editorial board criticized Bass for her role in blocking the housing development.

In 2025, Bass supported the Los Angeles City Council in opposing state legislation SB 79, which would allow dense housing near major public transit stations in California. She urged Governor Gavin Newsom to veto the legislation, but he ultimately signed it in October 2025. After trying unsuccessfully to block SB 79, her administration sought to delay the implementation of the housing legislation in Los Angeles.

In April 2026, Bass signed an executive order aimed at streamlining construction of new residential construction through ordering the Planning Department to investigate reforms like self-certification. Her proposed 2026–2027 budget included plans to loosen regulations on short-term rentals and allow Airbnb to pre-pay a portion of lodging taxes on short-term rental units, which has been supported by the company and criticized by elected officials including Los Angeles City Councilwoman Monica Rodriguez.

In June 2026, it was reported that around one-third of units under Los Angeles's master leasing program, around 250 units, have remained vacant under Bass's tenure.

==== January 2025 wildfires ====
At the start of the January 2025 Southern California wildfires, Bass was attending the inauguration of John Mahama as president in Ghana, despite promising not to travel abroad during her term as mayor. She returned to Los Angeles by United States military transport. Prior to Bass's departure for Ghana, the National Weather Service issued warnings of "extreme fire weather conditions" and an impending windstorm. When the Palisades Fire first began to erupt, Bass was attending a cocktail party at an embassy, where she posed for photos. Bass's trip led to substantial criticism from across the political spectrum as a sign that she underestimated the risk of wildfires. Caruso, whose daughter lost her home to the Palisades Fire, made repeated television appearances condemning the lack of fire preparation by the city and stating that Pacific Palisades fire hydrants did not have enough water.

Los Angeles Times owner Patrick Soon-Shiong and Los Angeles Fire Department Chief Kristin Crowley criticized Bass for cutting $17.6 million from the annual budget to the fire department. Soon-Shiong noted that severe fire hazard conditions had been known well in advance and that fire hydrants in Pacific Palisades lacked pressure. Crowley warned in December 2024 that the $17.6 million budget reduction approved by Bass had reduced the department's emergency response capabilities against events like wildfires, highlighting a reduction from the department's overtime budget. The $17.6 million budget cut came after Bass had initially proposed a $23 million cut from the fire department's budget. After the cuts made in the annual budget from June 2024, $53 million was later approved by the city for pay raises for firefighters and another $58 million was approved for new firetrucks and equipment in November. After initially declining to respond to criticism, Bass stated on January 9 that "there were no reductions that were made that would have impacted the situation" before refusing to answer further questions about the topic.

On February 21, 2025, Bass fired Crowley as Fire Chief, claiming that Crowley had left the department unprepared in advance of the outbreak of the Palisades Fire. She claimed that she was only in Ghana because Crowley failed to warn her about the fire danger, something Crowley has pushed back on. The decision to fire Crowley was criticized by many, including Caruso, who alongside various media outlets linked the firing to Crowley speaking out about fire department budget cuts.

=== 2026 election ===
On July 1, 2024, Bass announced that she would run for a second term in 2026. Bass drew numerous challengers to her reelection, most notably Republican Spencer Pratt, a former reality television personality whose home was destroyed in the 2025 Palisades fire, and Councilmember Nithya Raman, a fellow Democrat.

In the June 2, 2026 primary, Bass came in first place with 34.27% of the vote. As she did not receive a majority of the vote, Bass faced Raman, the runner-up, in the November 3, 2026 election. Raman defeated Bass in the November runoff.

== Political positions ==
In 2018, the Los Angeles Stonewall Democratic Club named Bass its Public Official of the Year. In 2019, she voted in favor of the Equality Act, which would ban discrimination against LGBTQ people in housing, employment, education, credit and financing, and more.

Bass voted for the first and second impeachments of Donald Trump.

=== Child welfare reform ===
Upon arriving in Congress, Bass founded the Congressional Caucus on Foster Youth (CCFY), a bipartisan group of members of Congress that develops policy recommendations to strengthen the child welfare system. One of the group's most significant achievements was the passage of the Family First Prevention Services Act, also known as Family First, which was signed into law as part of the Bipartisan Budget Act on February 9, 2018. This reform aims to change child welfare systems across the country by addressing the top reasons children are removed from their homes and placed in foster care.

Starting in May 2012, the Caucus began hosting an annual Foster Youth Shadow Day, during which foster youth come to Washington, DC, for a week to learn about advocating for reforms to the child welfare system. The week culminates in Shadow Day, when participants spend a day following their members of Congress through their daily routine. Bass serves on the organization's board of directors.

=== Criminal justice and policing ===
Bass believes that the criminal justice system is broken in part due to the disproportionate incarceration rates of poor people of color. Bass has long called for criminal justice reform and to pay special attention to the way the criminal justice system treats women: how they originally entered the system, how they are treated in prison, and what happens to them after they are released. Bass previously served as Chair of the House Judiciary Subcommittee on Crime, Terrorism, and Homeland Security.

In 2018, she voted in favor of the First Step Act, which focused on rehabilitating people in prison by incentivizing them with the possibility of an earlier release. Her contribution to the bill was a section addressing what she considers the inhumane practice of shackling women during pregnancy, labor, and delivery.

As mayor of Los Angeles, Bass has consistently backed increases to the Los Angeles Police Department's budget, which usually is about 40% of the city's budget. In 2025, Bass proposed a budget that would have laid off 1,600 city workers while increasing LAPD's budget to $3.3 billion. She also pushed back against reports that "police misconduct and related claims" cost the city almost $400 million from September 2019 to November 2025, saying it "was not an accurate number." In 2026, Bass's budget proposal included funds to hire 510 new police officers. The Los Angeles Police Protective League, which represents sworn members of the LAPD, has endorsed Karen Bass for re-election.

=== Immigration ===
In 2021, Bass was an original cosponsor of the New Way Forward Act, which would overhaul federal immigration enforcement by eliminating mandatory detention, decriminalize unauthorized entry and reentry, narrow criminal grounds for deportation, and expand judicial discretion in removal proceedings.

=== Foreign policy ===
Bass has expressed support for defense aid to Israel throughout her career. Despite this, Bass was one of more than 115 House Democrats to sign a letter in 2020 criticizing Israel's plan to annex parts of Palestinian territory in the occupied West Bank. In 2023, she voiced support for Israel during the Gaza war.

During the Second Nagorno-Karabakh War, Bass condemned the military offensive launched by Azerbaijani and Turkish-backed forces on Artsakh. In response to the 2022 blockade of the Republic of Artsakh, Bass expressed support for providing direct humanitarian assistance to Artsakh, facilitating negotiations between Baku and Stepanakert to guarantee the rights and security of Artsakh's Armenian population, and replacing Russian troops in Artsakh with international peacekeepers.

=== Student loan debt ===
In 2019, Bass introduced two pieces of legislation to address student loan debt. The Student Loan Fairness Act of 2019 addresses this crisis in three major ways: creating a new "10-10" standard, capping the interest rate, and accounting for the cost of living. With Danny Davis, she also introduced the Financial Aid Fairness for Students (FAFSA) Act, which would repeal a law that makes it all but impossible for people with a drug conviction to receive federal financial aid for higher education.

=== George Floyd Justice in Policing Act ===
After the murder of George Floyd and massive nationwide protests, Bass and Representative Jerry Nadler co-authored the George Floyd Justice in Policing Act of 2020, aimed at restraining police practices such as chokeholds, carotid holds, and no-knock warrants, and making it easier to prosecute police if they break the law.

The bill passed the Democratic-controlled House of Representatives on a mostly party-line vote of 220–212, but not the evenly divided Senate amid opposition from Republicans. Negotiations between Republican and Democratic senators on a reform bill collapsed in September 2021.

== Personal life ==
From 1980 to 1986, Bass was married to Jesus Lechuga. Following their divorce, Bass and Lechuga jointly raised their daughter and her siblings, Bass's four stepchildren. Her daughter, Emilia Bass-Lechuga, and son-in-law, Michael Wright, were killed in a car crash in 2006. Bass worships at a Baptist church.

=== September 2022 burglary ===
On September 9, 2022, Bass's Los Angeles home was burgled and two firearms were stolen. In a public statement, Bass called the incident "unnerving" and "something that far too many Angelenos have faced." According to Bass, the firearms had been securely stored, and no other valuables were taken from her home. As of September 14, two suspects in the criminal investigation were detained at the LAPD Valley Jail awaiting trial on residential burglary charges. In an interview, Bass said the incident "shattered" her sense of safety within Los Angeles.

=== April 2024 break-in ===
On April 21, 2024, a person broke a window and entered the Getty House, Bass's residence as mayor of Los Angeles. She and her family were reportedly unharmed, and the suspect was apprehended.

== See also ==
- African American mayors in California
- History of African-Americans in Los Angeles
- List of African-American United States representatives
- List of female speakers of legislatures in the United States
- List of mayors of the 50 largest cities in the United States
- Women in the United States House of Representatives

California Assembly
Preceded by Dario Frommer	Majority Leader of the California State Assembly; 2006–2008	Succeeded by Alberto Torrico
Political offices
Preceded by Fabian Núñez	Speaker of the California State Assembly; 2008–2010	Succeeded by John Pérez
Preceded by Eric Garcetti	Mayor of Los Angeles; 2022–2026	Incumbent
U.S. House of Representatives
Preceded by Diane Watson	Member of the U.S. House of Representatives from California's 33rd congressional district 2011–2013	Succeeded by Henry Waxman
Preceded by Laura Richardson	Member of the U.S. House of Representatives from California's 37th congressional district 2013–2022	Succeeded by Sydney Kamlager
Preceded by Cedric Richmond	Chair of the Congressional Black Caucus; 2019–2021	Succeeded by Joyce Beatty
U.S. order of precedence (ceremonial)
Preceded by Duncan D. Hunter as Former U.S. Representative	Order of precedence of the United States as Former U.S. Representative	Succeeded by Alan Lowenthal as Former U.S. Representative
