= List of USC Gould School of Law alumni =

The University of Southern California Gould School of Law (USC Gould), located in Los Angeles, California, is a law school within the University of Southern California. The oldest law school in the Southwestern United States, USC Law had its beginnings in 1896, and was officially established as a school of the university in 1900.

== U.S. federal Court of Appeals judges ==
- Arthur Alarcón (1951) – judge of the U.S. Ninth Circuit Court of Appeals (1979–1992)
- James Marshall Carter (1927) – judge of the U.S. Ninth Circuit Court of Appeals (1967–1971); judge of the U.S. District Court for the Southern District of California (1949–1967)
- Walter Raleigh Ely, Jr. (LL.M. 1949) – judge of the U.S. Ninth Circuit Court of Appeals (1964–1979)
- Warren J. Ferguson (1949) – judge of the U.S. Ninth Circuit Court of Appeals (1979–1986); judge of the U.S. District Court for the Central District of California (1966–1979)
- Ferdinand Francis Fernandez (1962) – senior judge of the U.S. Ninth Circuit Court of Appeals (2002–present); judge of the U.S. Ninth Circuit Court of Appeals (1989–2002); judge of the U.S. District Court for the Central District of California (1985–1989)
- Dorothy Wright Nelson (LL.M. 1956) – judge of the U.S. Ninth Circuit Court of Appeals (1979–1995)
- David R. Thompson (1955) – judge of the U.S. Ninth Circuit Court of Appeals (1985–1998)
- Charles E. Wiggins (1956) – judge of the U.S. Ninth Circuit Court of Appeals (1984–1996)

== U.S. federal District Court for the Central District of California judges ==
- William Matthew Byrne, Jr. (1956) – judge of the U.S. District Court for the Central District of California (1971–1998)
- Thurmond Clarke (1927) – judge of the U.S. District Court for the Central District of California (1966–1970); judge of the U.S. District Court for the Southern District of California (1955–1966)
- Elisha Avery Crary (1929) – judge of the U.S. District Court for the Central District of California (1966–1975); judge of the U.S. District Court for the Southern District of California (1962–1966)
- Richard Arthur Gadbois, Jr. (1960) – judge of the U.S. District Court for the Central District of California (1982–1996)
- Peirson Mitchell Hall – judge of the U.S. District Court for the Central District of California (1966–1968); judge of the U.S. District Court for the Southern District of California (1942–1966)
- James M. Ideman (1963) – judge of the U.S. District Court for the Central District of California (1984–1998)
- David Vreeland Kenyon (1957) – judge of the U.S. District Court for the Central District of California (1980–1995)
- George H. King (1974) – judge of the U.S. District Court for the Central District of California (1995–present)
- Stephen G. Larson (1989) – judge of the U.S. District Court for the Central District of California (2006–2009)
- Nora Margaret Manella (1975) – judge of the U.S. District Court for the Central District of California (1998–2006)
- Edward Rafeedie (1959) – judge of the U.S. District Court for the Central District of California (1982–1996)
- Albert Lee Stephens, Jr. (1938) – judge of the U.S. District Court for the Central District of California (1966–1979); judge of the U.S. District Court for the Southern District of California (1961–1966)
- Alicemarie Huber Stotler (1967) – judge of the U.S. District Court for the Central District of California (1984–2009)
- Robert Mitsuhiro Takasugi (1959) – first Japanese American federal judge; judge of the U.S. District Court for the Central District of California (1976–1996)
- Dickran Tevrizian (1965) – judge of the U.S. District Court for the Central District of California (1985–2005)
- Laughlin Edward Waters, Sr. (1947) – judge of the U.S. District Court for the Central District of California (1976–1986)
- David W. Williams (1937) – first African American federal judge west of the Mississippi River; judge of the U.S. District Court for the Central District of California (1969–1981)

== Other U.S. federal court judges ==
- Mary Ann Cohen (1967) – judge of the United States Tax Court (1982–present)
- J. Lawrence Irving (1963) – judge of the U.S. District Court for the Southern District of California (1982–1990)
- David W. Ling (1913) – judge of the U.S. District Court for the District of Arizona (1936–1964)
- Leland Chris Nielsen (1946) – judge of the U.S. District Court for the Southern District of California (1971–1985)
- Howard Boyd Turrentine (1939) – judge of the U.S. District Court for the Southern District of California (1970–1984)
- Ronald M. Whyte (1967) – judge of the U.S. District Court for the Northern District of California (1992–2009)

== California Supreme Court justices ==
- David Eagleson (1950) – associate justice of the California Supreme Court (1987–1991)
- Douglas L. Edmonds (1910) – associate justice of the California Supreme Court (1936–1955)
- Frederick W. Houser (1900) – associate justice of the California Supreme Court (1937–1942)
- Marcus Kaufman (1956) – associate justice of the California Supreme Court (1987–1990)
- Joyce L. Kennard (1974) – first Asian-American to serve as an associate justice of the California Supreme Court (1989–2014)
- Malcolm M. Lucas (1953) – 26th chief justice of California (1987–1996); associate justice of the California Supreme Court (1984–1987); judge of the U.S. District Court for the Central District of California (1971–1984); all four appointments by Republican governor George Deukmejian

== Business ==
- Mandana Dayani (born 1982) – Iranian-American businesswoman and media executive
- Larry Flax (1967) – co-founder of California Pizza Kitchen
- Louis Galen (1951) – former CEO of Golden West Financial, philanthropist
- Stanley Gold (1967) – president and CEO of Shamrock Holdings
- Brian Grazer (left in 1975) – Oscar-winning co-founder of Imagine Entertainment
- Bruce Karatz (1970) – CEO of KB Home
- Sol Price (1957) – founder of Fed Mart and Price Club (Costco Wholesale Corp.)
- Charles Prince (1975) – former chairman and CEO of Citigroup
- James E. Rogers (1963) – CEO and owner, Sunbelt Communications
- Richard Rosenblatt (1994) – founder, CEO, Intermix & Demand Media; former chairman, MySpace; founder and former CEO, iMALL
- Jeff Smulyan (1972) – founder and CEO of Emmis Communications
- C. Bertrand Thompson (1900) – first African-American graduate of USC Law School at age 18, early scholar of scientific management

== Other ==
- Greg Bautzer (1936) – celebrity divorce attorney
- Tiffiny Blacknell (2002) – deputy district attorney for the Los Angeles County and community activist
- Steve Cooley (1973) – 41st Los Angeles County district attorney
- Gordon Dean (1930) – former USC Law School professor; chairman of the US Atomic Energy Commission (AEC)
- Charles Gessler (1961) – deputy public defender and capital defense lawyer
- David Getches (1967) – former dean and Raphael J. Moses Professor of Natural Resources Law at the University of Colorado School of Law
- James P. Gray (1971) – presiding judge of the Superior Court of Orange County; former Libertarian candidate for U.S. Senate and for vice president of the United States
- Jack Carl Greenburg (1933) – former chief clerk of the California State Assembly
- Susan Grode (1939 – 2026) – fine art and entertainment lawyer, activist, and author
- George Hedges (1978) – senior partner at Quinn Emanuel Urquhart Oliver & Hedges LLP and attorney to celebrity clients
- You Chung Hong (1924) – first Chinese American admitted to practice in California
- Frederick N. Howser (1930) – 22nd attorney general of California
- Douglas Kmiec (1976) – former U.S. ambassador to Malta, Caruso Family Chair in Constitutional Law at Pepperdine University, former dean and St. Thomas More Professor at The Catholic University of America, former director of Law & Government Center, University of Notre Dame
- Jackie Lacey (1982) – first woman and first African American to serve as District Attorney of Los Angeles County
- Charles Older (1952) – California Superior Court judge presiding over trial of Charles Manson; also one of the Flying Tigers pilots of World War II
- Aulana L. Peters (1973) – first African American and third woman to serve as commissioner of the U.S. Securities and Exchange Commission
- Margaret Radin (1976) – law professor at Stanford Law School; former USC Law School professor
- E. Randol Schoenberg (1991) – attorney specializing in legal cases related to the recovery of looted or stolen artworks; one of the central figures of the 2015 film Woman in Gold, which depicted the case he brought against the Austrian government
- Mabel Walker Willebrandt (1916) – Assistant U.S. Attorney General (1921–1929)

== Politics ==
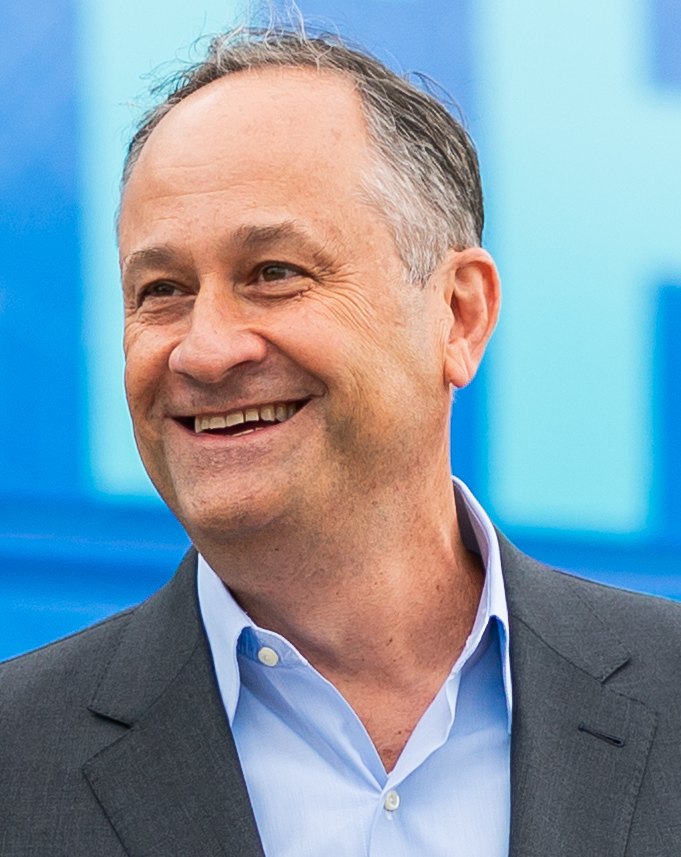
Doug Emhoff, Second Gentleman of the United States

- Arthur Alber (1918) – Los Angeles City Council member (1927–29)
- Nanette Barragan (2005) – current United States representative (California)
- Fletcher Bowron (1911) – former mayor of Los Angeles
- Yvonne Brathwaite Burke (1956) – Los Angeles County supervisor, former member of the United States House of Representatives
- J. Curtis Counts (1941) – director of the Federal Mediation and Conciliation Service
- Charles K. Djou (1996) – former United States representative (Hawaii)
- Doug Emhoff (1990) – lawyer, Second Gentleman of the United States
- Robert Finch (1951) – former lieutenant governor of California, former United States Secretary of Health, Education, and Welfare
- Buron Fitts (1916) – former lieutenant governor of California
- Bertrand W. Gearhart (1910) – lawyer and former member of the United States House of Representatives
- Fred Hall (1941) – former governor of Kansas
- John Heilman (1982) – mayor of West Hollywood, lecturer at USC Gould
- Craig Hosmer (1940) – former United States representative
- Thomas Kuchel (1935) – former United States senator
- James Stuart McKnight (1908) – Los Angeles City Council member (1931–33)
- Carlos Moorhead (1949) – former United States representative
- William A. Munnell (1948) – former majority floor leader of the California State Assembly from California's 51st State Assembly district, 1959–1961; also a judge for the Los Angeles County Superior Court, 1961–1985
- Pat Nolan (1975) – member of the California State Assembly, 1978–1994; Republican Assembly leader, 1984–1988; one of eight members of U.S. Prison Rape Commission, 2005–2009, appointed by Speaker of the House of Representatives
- James B. Utt (1946) – former United States representative
- Michael L. Williams (1979) – senior commissioner of the Railroad Commission of Texas, Texas commissioner of Education

== Sports and media ==
- Terry Baker (1968) – played quarterback for the Los Angeles Rams and the CFL's Edmonton Eskimos while earning a J.D. at USC
- Ronald Barak (1968) – Olympic gymnast
- Lillian Copeland (1932) – Olympic discus champion; set world records in discus, javelin, and shot put
- Philip N. Krasne (1929) – producer of the later Charlie Chan films and the Cisco Kid television series
- Carey McWilliams (1927) – editor of The Nation for 20 years
- Rick Neuheisel (1990) – former head football coach at UCLA and former UCLA quarterback
- Amy Trask (1985) – former CEO of the Oakland Raiders
- Joseph Wapner (1948) – judge of The People's Court; former Los Angeles County Superior Court judge
- Wally Wolf (1930–1997) – swimmer, water polo player, and Olympic champion
