= Government of Los Angeles County =

Government of the County of Los Angeles
- Charter County
- Seal of Los Angeles County
- Formation: February 18, 1850; 176 years ago
- County charter: 2002
- State: California
- Country: United States
- Website: lacounty.gov

County-wide elected officials
- County Sheriff: LA County Sheriff
- District Attorney: LA County DA
- County Assessor: LA County Assessor

Board of Supervisors
- Chair: Hilda Solis, Chair
- Meeting place: Kenneth Hahn Hall of Administration

Chief Executive Office
- Acting Chief Executive Officer: Joseph M. Nicchitta, CEO
- Appointed by: Appointed by Board of Supervisors

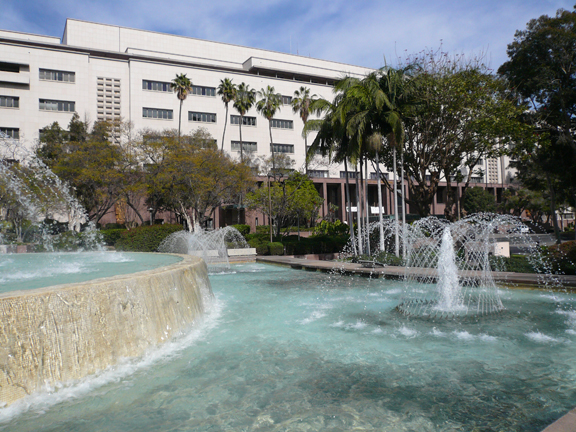
The Kenneth Hahn Hall of Administration where the board of supervisors meets.

The government of Los Angeles County operates as a charter county under the California Constitution, California law, and the Charter of the County of Los Angeles. Much of the government of California is in practice the responsibility of county governments such as Los Angeles County. The county government provides countywide services such as elections and voter registration, law enforcement, jails, vital records, property records, tax collection, public health, and social services. In addition the county serves as the local government for all unincorporated areas.

It is composed of the elected five-member Board of Supervisors, several other elected offices including the Sheriff, District Attorney, and Assessor, and numerous county departments and entities under the supervision of the chief executive officer.

Some chartered cities such as Los Angeles and Long Beach provide municipal services such as police, fire, libraries, parks and recreation, and zoning. Other cities arrange to have the County provide some or all of these services under contract. In addition, several entities of the government of California have jurisdiction coterminous with Los Angeles County, such as the Los Angeles Superior Court.

== Overview ==
Los Angeles County is the most populous county in the United States, and the largest municipal government in the nation. If the county were a state, it would be the 9th most populous state in the United States, in between Georgia and North Carolina. As of 2024, the Board of Supervisors oversees a $49.2 billion annual budget and over 117,000 employees. The county workforce is larger than the state-level government workforces of most U.S. states.

== Organization ==
=== Board of Supervisors ===
Under its foundational Charter, the five-member elected Los Angeles County Board of Supervisors (BOS) is the county legislature. The board operates in a legislative, executive, and quasi-judicial capacity. As a legislative authority, it can pass ordinances for the unincorporated areas (ordinances that affect the whole county, like posting of restaurant ratings, must be ratified by the individual city). As an executive body, it can tell the county departments what to do, and how to do it. As a quasi-judicial body, the Board is the final venue of appeal in the local planning process, and holds public hearings on various agenda items. A local nickname sometimes used for the board is the "five little kings."

The board members as of December 2, 2024 were:

- Hilda Solis, district 1 (Chair)
- Holly Mitchell, district 2 (Chair Pro Tem)
- Lindsey Horvath, district 3
- Janice Hahn, district 4
- Kathryn Barger, district 5

=== Elected officers ===
In addition to the board of supervisors, there are several elected officers that form the Government of Los Angeles County that are required by the California Constitution and California law and authorized under the Charter.

==== Sheriff ====
The Los Angeles County Sheriff provides general-service law enforcement to unincorporated areas of Los Angeles County, serving as the equivalent of the county police for unincorporated areas of the county as well as incorporated cities within the county that have contracted with the agency for law enforcement. Of the 88 cities in Los Angeles County, 40 are just such "contract cities," in an arrangement pioneered in 1954 by the city of Lakewood, California and known as the Lakewood Plan.

==== District Attorney ====
The Los Angeles County District Attorney prosecutes all felony crimes that occur anywhere within Los Angeles County (cities and unincorporated areas), and any misdemeanor crimes that occur within the unincorporated areas of the county, and for any city that has abdicated this responsibility to the county. The City of Los Angeles, for example, has its own city attorney to handle most misdemeanor crimes and infractions that occur within the City of Los Angeles.

==== Assessor ====
The Los Angeles County Assessor is the assessor responsible for discovering all taxable property in Los Angeles County except for state-assessed property and inventorying and listing all the taxable property, valuing the property, and enrolling the property on the local assessment roll.

=== Chief Executive Officer ===
The Chief Executive Officer (CEO), also known the chief administrative officer, assists the board of supervisors in handling the mounting administrative details of the county and coordinating between departments.

From 2007 to 2015, the CEO had direct supervision over 31 of the 37 departments while the other departments (Assessor, Auditor-Controller, Community Development Commission, County Counsel, District Attorney, Executive Office of the Board of Supervisors, Fire, and Sheriff) did not report to the CEO.

Prior to 2007 and from 2015 and following, the CEO provides a strategic coordination and support role. Departments submit recommendations and action items directly to the Board offices without CEO input required, and are fired and hired directly by the board, with the CEO providing administrative support in negotiating department head salaries and facilitating communications between departments when necessary. Board offices felt that the CEO added bureaucracy and that the additional deputy and assistant CEOs added little value.

Other tasks specifically given to the CEO include preparation and control of the annual budget in consultation with departments, providing leadership and direction for Board-sponsored initiatives and priorities, analysis and advocacy of state and federal legislation; coordinating Countywide strategic communications and cross-departmental public information (including the main County website), and managing capital projects and debt, asset, leasing and space management. The CEO's office also administers the risk management and insurance programs, and facilitates departments addressing unincorporated area issues and international protocol issues, manages the county's employee relations program and compensation/classification systems, represents the board in labor negotiations, and monitors cable television companies operating in unincorporated areas. The chief information officer, Homeless Initiative (which manages Measure H, the voter-approved homeless tax), child care, and Office of Emergency Management are also located in the CEO's office.

==== Public safety ====
- Los Angeles County Department of Medical Examiner - Coroner: performs autopsies and determines the cause of death for those who die without medical supervision.
- Los Angeles County Public Defender: defends indigent criminal suspects

==== Health ====
- Los Angeles County Department of Health Services: operates several county hospitals and a network of primary care clinics, and also runs the public health care system such as My Health LA (Low Income Health Program)
- Los Angeles County Department of Public Health
- Los Angeles County Department of Mental Health
- L.A. Care Health Plan: a non-profit public health plan created to help Los Angeles County residents obtain affordable health care.

==== Children and families ====
- Los Angeles County Department of Children and Family Services: administers foster care.
- Los Angeles County Department of Public Social Services: administers many federal and state welfare programs within the county, such as Medi-Cal (Medicaid), CalFresh (food stamps), and CalWORKs (TANF).

==== Community ====
- Los Angeles County Department of Beaches and Harbors: responsible for operating the county-owned harbor in Marina Del Rey as well as the network of county beaches.
- Los Angeles County Department of Parks and Recreation – administers public parks and the largest public golf course system in the U.S.
- Los Angeles County Department of Public Works: operates countywide flood control system, constructs and maintains roads in unincorporated areas
- Los Angeles County Department of Regional Planning: responsible for planning functions for unincorporated areas. The department maintains the Zoning Code that regulates land use in the unincorporated areas, researches and facilitates land-use decisions, and serves to connect the community to the established building regulations. It supports the Regional Planning Commission, a five-member quasi-judicial body under the board of supervisors.
- Los Angeles County Public Library: operates a large network of branch libraries throughout the county
- Los Angeles County Museum of Art: public art museum
- Los Angeles County Museum of Natural History: public history and science museum located in Exposition Park

==== Operations ====
- The Los Angeles County Treasurer and Tax Collector: responsible for billing and collecting taxes. The Treasurer-Tax Collector is appointed by the board of supervisors.
- Los Angeles County Internal Services Department: responsible for the general operations of county government, including Information Technology Service, Data Center management, County Cyber security, fleet management, energy and environmental services, building management, contracting and procuring, etc.
- Los Angeles County Department of Animal Care and Control: runs the animal shelter system of Los Angeles County and provides a variety of animal control field services and licensing.
- Los Angeles County Agricultural Commissioner / Weights & Measures: responsible for weights & measures inspections, vector control services, environmental protection, and agricultural produce inspections.
- Los Angeles County Registrar-Recorder / County Clerk: responsible for voter registration and elections with the county, birth; death; and marriage records, recording of legal documents and fictitious business filings, registration of notaries, and issuance of marriage licenses.

==== Independent ====
- Los Angeles County Auditor-Controller: responsible for allocating collected taxes to the appropriate taxing jurisdictions such as the county, cities, schools and special districts within the county, receipts, and financial reporting. The Auditor-Controller is appointed by the board of supervisors.
- Los Angeles County Department of Children and Family Services: administers foster care
- Community Development Commission of the County of Los Angeles serves as the county's housing authority as well as the housing and community and economic development agency with wide-ranging programs that benefit residents and business owners in unincorporated County areas and in various incorporated cities.
- Los Angeles County Fire Department: provides fire protection, suppression, and prevention as well as emergency medical services
  - Los Angeles County Fire Department Lifeguard Division: (portrayed in the famous television series Baywatch).
- Los Angeles County Probation Department: responsible for running the county's juvenile halls as well monitoring former juvenile and adults offenders during their reintegration into society.
- Los Angeles County Department of Consumer Affairs: offers consumers in the county a variety of services including: consumer and real estate counseling, mediation, and small claims counseling. The department also investigates consumer complains, real estate fraud, and identity theft issues.
- Los Angeles County Board of Education: maintains the policies for governance of the Los Angeles County Office of Education (LACOE) and appoints the Los Angeles County Superintendent of Schools. It is composed of seven members who are appointed by the board of supervisors to two- and four-year terms. In general, the LACOE's only direct authority over local districts is in matters of interdistrict attendance appeals, school district boundary changes, and expulsion appeals. The LACOE directly operates the Los Angeles County High School for the Arts in partnership with California State University, Los Angeles, and the International Polytechnic High School in partnership with the Cal Poly Pomona College of Education and Integrative Studies.
- Los Angeles County Employees Retirement Association (LACERA): administers defined retirement plan benefits for the employees of Los Angeles County and outside districts pursuant to the County Employees Retirement Law of 1937

==== Defunct County Agencies ====
- Los Angeles County Office of Public Safety: informally known as the County Police, was responsible for law enforcement services at County facilities and Parks. Merged into the Los Angeles County Sheriff's Department in 2010.
- Los Angeles County Department of Small Craft Harbors: operated the county harbor of Marina del Rey. Merged into the Department of Beaches and Harbors.
- Los Angeles County Department of Arboreta and Botanic Gardens: responsible for operating the Los Angeles County Arboretum and other botanic gardens. Absorbed by the Los Angeles County Department of Parks and Recreation in 1993.
- Los Angeles County Department of Beaches: merged into the Department of Beaches and Harbors.
- Los Angeles County Mechanical Department: Responsible for maintenance, repairs, and security for all County-owned buildings, and well as fleet services for county vehicles. Merged into the Los Angeles County Internal Services Department
- Los Angeles County Marshal's Department: Responsible for courthouse security, bailiff services, and civil process services to the Municipal Court system. Merged into the Sheriff's Department when the Municipal and Superior Court systems were amalgamated.
- Los Angeles County Department of Charities: responsible for operating the county hospitals, poor farm, and welfare system. Split into the Department of Hospitals and Department of Public Social Services in 1966.
- Los Angeles County Facilities Management Department: merged into the Internal Services Department
- Los Angeles County Department of Health: responsible for public health throughout the county; merged in 1971 with the Los Angeles County Department of Hospitals to form the Department of Health Services.
- Los Angeles County Department of Hospitals: operated the county hospitals; merged with the Los Angeles County Health Department to form the Department of Health Services in 1971.
- Los Angeles County Roads Department: responsible for constructing and maintaining roads in unincorporated areas, merged into the Public Works Department in 1985
- Los Angeles County Engineer: responsible for building safety and regulation. Merged into the Public Works Department in 1985
- Los Angeles County Flood Control District: quasi-independent agency responsible for flood control channel and dam construction. Merged into the Public Works Department in 1985.
- Los Angeles County Air Pollution Control District: quasi-independent agency responsible for air quality regulation. Merged into the fully independent South Coast Air Quality Management District along with the Air Pollution Control Districts of Orange, San Bernardino, and Riverside Counties in 1977.

The Chief Executive Officer as of September 1, 2020 is:

- Fesia Davenport

== Law ==
The Los Angeles County Code is the codified law of the County in the form of ordinances passed by the board of supervisors. Every act prohibited or declared unlawful and every failure to perform an act required by the ordinances is a misdemeanor, unless otherwise specified as an infraction.

== Budget ==
As of 2024, the Board of Supervisors oversees a $49.2 billion annual budget and over 117,000 employees.

== Controversies ==
The county was targeted with the threat of legal action by the American Civil Liberties Union at various points in time regarding a small cross on the Seal of Los Angeles County. The ACLU said that separation of church and state prohibited this display. The seal has been modified numerous times in response to this complaint and other concerns.

== Other governments ==
=== California ===
In the State Senate, the 20th, 22nd, 24th, 26th, 28th, and 30th districts are entirely within the county, as well as much of the 21st, 25th, 27th, 29th, and 32nd districts.

In the State Assembly, the 39th, 43rd, 46th, 48th, 49th, 50th, 51st, 53rd, 54th, 57th, 58th, 59th, 62nd, 63rd, 64th, 66th, and 70th districts are entirely within the county, most of the 36th, 38th, 41st, and 45th districts are in the county, and parts of the 44th, 52nd, 55th districts are in the county.

The Los Angeles Superior Court, which covers the entire county, is not a County department but a division of the State's trial court system. Historically, the courthouses were county-owned buildings that were maintained at county expense, which created significant friction since the trial court judges, as officials of the state government, had to lobby the county board of supervisors for facility renovations and upgrades. In turn, the state judiciary successfully persuaded the state Legislature to authorize the transfer of all courthouses to the state government in 2008 and 2009 (so that judges would have direct control over their own courthouses). Courthouse security is still provided by the county government under a contract with the state.

=== City of Los Angeles ===
The City of Los Angeles government operates as a charter city (as opposed to a general law city) under the Charter of the City of Los Angeles. The elected government is composed of the Los Angeles City Council with 15 city council districts and the Mayor of Los Angeles. which operate under a mayor-council government, as well as the Los Angeles City Attorney and the Los Angeles City Controller. In addition, there are numerous departments and appointed officers such as the Los Angeles Police Department (LAPD) including the Los Angeles Board of Police Commissioners and the Chief of the Los Angeles Police Department, the Los Angeles Fire Department (LAFD), the Housing Authority of the City of Los Angeles (HACLA), the Los Angeles Department of Transportation (LADOT), the Los Angeles Public Library (LAPL), and the Los Angeles City Clerk.

=== Special districts ===
The Los Angeles Local Agency Formation Commission (LALAFCo) is the Local Agency Formation Commission (LAFCo) for Los Angeles County and regulates special districts within its jurisdiction.

== History ==
The current charter was proposed by the Los Angeles County Board of Freeholders on September 24, 1912, ratified by the electorate on November 5, 1912, filed with the California Secretary of State on January 29, 1913, and became effective June 2, 1913. It was the first local government to be granted Home Rule in the United States since the 1911 Home Rule Amendment was added to the Constitution of California.
