= Los Cerritos Community News =

Weekly newspaper in California, United States

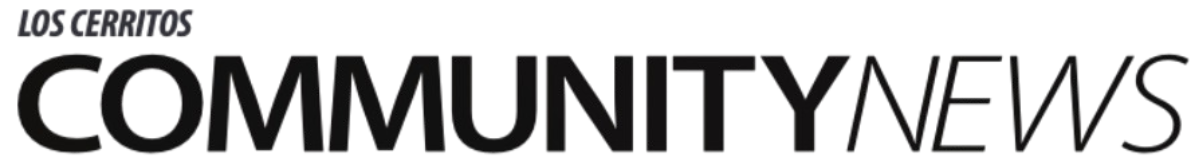

- Front page on July 4, 2025
- Type: Weekly newspaper
- Owner: Hews Media Group
- Publisher: Brian Hews
- Editor-in-chief: Brian Hews
- Language: English
- Headquarters: La Mirada, California
- Circulation: 35,000 – 86,000 weekly
- Readership: 150,000+
- OCLC number: 46614712
- Website: www.loscerritosnews.net

Los Cerritos Community News, also known as Cerritos Community News, is a local weekly newspaper published in California. It covers the cities of Artesia, Bellflower, Buena Park, Cerritos, Commerce, Downey, Hawaiian Gardens, East Lakewood, La Mirada, La Palma, Norwalk, and Pico Rivera. It publishes its papers on Fridays and has won fourteen Los Angeles Press Club awards.

Brian Hews is the newspaper's sole editor, publisher, and owner. Much of the paper's revenue comes from mandatory public notices placed by cities and government programs. It has been criticized for publishing negative and false stories relating to local political figures.

== History ==
The newspaper received much attention in 2012 when it published a story alleging Los Angeles County Assessor John Noguez of corruption. Multiple people then spoke out about Hews' exclusive control over the newspaper and his subjectiveness being carried over into the paper. Ron Beilke, a city council member in Pico Rivera, said that Hews tended to ally with certain figures and people he likes. The former editor of the paper, who quit in 2013, Jerry Bernstein, explained that Hews would falsify and exaggerate facts about people that he did not like, without any substantiation.

Hews faced a lawsuit for libel in 2017, after reporting that the director of the Central Basin Water board, Leticia Vasquez, and Montebello councilmember, Vanessa Delgado, tried to extort money from a real estate firm the year before. Vasquez denied the charges, and Hews was later fined $2,500 because he withheld evidence without any legal justification. During the lawsuit, Randy Economy, the reporter for the Noguez story, and Bernstein filed declarations claiming that Hews "regularly published false stories about public officials he feuded with or who did not support his newspaper via advertising."

Hews received national scrutiny in 2014 when Jim Romenesko wrote about him in his blog, claiming that Hews copied some of sportscaster Dale Hansen's commentary on Michael Sam in his column. Hews later wrote on Twitter that it was "an honest mistake".
