= Department of Children and Family Services (Los Angeles County) =

Los Angeles County government agency

- Seal of Los Angeles County, California

Office overview
- Formed: 1984
- Jurisdiction: Government of Los Angeles County
- Employees: ~9000
- Annual budget: US$1,629,296,000 Federal, State & Other Revenue FY2025-26; US$565,223,000 County Cost FY2025-26
- Office executive: Brandon Nichols
- Website: dcfs.lacounty.gov

Department of Children and Family Services (DCFS) is an agency of the government of Los Angeles County. DCFS's operations involve investigating child welfare and abuse allegations, foster care, and adoption.

DCFS files child welfare allegations in Edmund D. Edelman Children's Court, located in Monterey Park, California, and the Alfred J. McCourtney Juvenile Justice Center in Lancaster, California. DCFS is represented by Los Angeles County Counsel. Los Angeles Dependency Lawyers represents the parents and Children's Law Center represents the children.

== History ==
Los Angeles County Social Services began their origin in the Office of Superintendent of Children's and Women's Work, formed in 1891, to care for destitute women and their children under the guidelines of the 1851 Poor Law. The Department of Charities was formed in 1913 and included five Divisions: County Hospital, County Poor Farm, Outdoor Relief, Olive View Sanatorium, and Cemetery Divisions. By statute enacted in 1903, California's first juvenile court had jurisdiction over dependent, neglected and delinquent children.

The Division of Outdoor Relief was expanded and renamed in 1938, the Bureau of Indigent Relief, and in 1943 changed again to the Bureau of Public Assistance. In 1966, the Bureau of Public Assistance became the Department of Public Social Services (DPSS).

In 1984, after public discussion and hearings, the Los Angeles County Board of Supervisors created both the Department of Children Services and the Commission for Children's Services. In 1994, the Board changed the name to the Department of Children and Family Services (DCFS).

In fiscal year 2024-2025, the Department of Children and Family Services received 97,633 referrals of alleged child abuse, neglect, or exploitation. Ages of children processed by the Department in that year as follows:

Birth - 2	17.9%
3 - 4	10.0%
5 - 9	23.0%
10 - 13	16.6%
14 - 15	9.1%
16 - 17	10.2%
18+	13.2%

== Notable investigations ==
According to reports DCFS had investigated Michael Jackson beginning in 1993, with a sexual abuse allegation and again in 2003. Reports show the LAPD and DCFS did not find credible evidence of abuse or sexual misconduct.

In 2013, eight-year-old Gabriel Fernandez was brutally murdered by his mother and her boyfriend in Palmdale, California. The two were found guilty of torture and first degree murder. Pearl Fernandez, the child's mother is currently serving life while her boyfriend Isauro Aguirre was sentenced to death. Charges of criminal negligence brought against employees of the Department of Children and Families of California prompted public outcry for accountability. In 2020, Netflix released the documentary "The Trials of Gabriel Fernandez" telling his story.
