= Noguez =

Noguez is a surname. Notable people with the surname include:

- Dominique Noguez (1942–2019), French writer
- John Noguez (born 1964), Mexican American politician
- María Isabel Studer Noguez, Mexican professor and researcher
