= Los Angeles Dependency Lawyers =

American non-profit organization

Los Angeles Dependency Lawyers, Inc.
Organization overview
- Formed: December 2006
- Headquarters: 901 Corporate Center Drive, Suite 520, Monterey Park, California, United States
- Employees: 109 (attorneys)
- Annual budget: US$56,700,000 (2024 revenue)
- Organization executives: Dennis Smeal, Executive Director; Lerry Poblete, Controller; Cindy Jackson, Human Resources Manager
- Website: ladlinc.org

Los Angeles Dependency Lawyers, Inc. (LADL) is a non-profit organization that represents parents in juvenile dependency proceedings in Los Angeles County. A dependency hearing is a court proceeding involving a child, typically in cases of parental abuse or neglect. The organization consists of five separate law firms and an executive office that is headed by Dennis Smeal.

Los Angeles Dependency Court hears an estimated 25,000 cases annually. Los Angeles County has the largest dependency system in the United States of America. LADL provides representation to 97% of the parents in Los Angeles County who have cases in dependency court.

LADL attorneys practice law at the Edmund D. Edelman Children's Court, located in Monterey Park, California, and the Alfred J. McCourtney Juvenile Justice Center in Lancaster, California. LADL works with attorneys from the Children's Law Center, representing children, and the Los Angeles County Counsel, representing Department of Children and Family Services (Los Angeles County). LADL also employs social workers and investigators. One LADL social worker wrote a book about her experience working for the Department of Children and Family Services (Los Angeles County).

== History ==
Los Angeles Dependency Lawyers, Inc. (LADL) was established in 2006 in response to a series of studies conducted by the Judiciary of California's Center for Families, Children, and the Courts, which concluded that parents involved in dependency proceedings were not receiving adequate legal representation under the prior public defense system. These findings led to the creation of LADL as a dedicated non-profit to improve the quality and consistency of legal advocacy for parents. Kenneth Krekorian was appointed as the first executive director.

== Media access ==
In 2012, the media gained unprecedented access to Los Angeles County dependency court proceedings. At that time, LADL publicly criticized the decision. Law Firm Director Marlene Furth believed that allowing the media in courtroom compromised confidentiality of personal matters and increased the tension in the proceedings.

== Funding issues ==
In 2012, Krekorian wrote to California Supreme Court Chief Justice Chief Tani Cantil-Sakauye in support of the Judiciary of California's Center for Families, Children and the Courts (CFCC). He also pointed out that funding is inadequate for court-appointed dependency counsel. Krekorian has also lamented the fact that many of the indigent parents his organization represents cannot afford the programs that they need to complete in order to reunify with their children.

== Advocacy ==
In 2014, LADL law firm director Alex Iglesias praised parents who reunified with their children at a Los Angeles County Board of Supervisors meeting where Department of Children and Family Services (Los Angeles County) officials celebrated "Family Reunification Heroes."

In 2015, LADL law firm director Marlene Furth criticized a California Court of Appeal ruling that held county officials may "remove an incorrigible child from her home, even if her parent has done everything in her power to control the child’s behavior." Furth believed that it violated a parent's due process rights. The San Francisco Chronicle joined her criticism.

In 2016, LADL partnered with the National Alliance to End Homelessness and other organizations to eliminate homelessness as a barrier to family reunification.
