= Charles Gessler =

American attorney (1933–2019)

Charles Addison Gessler (May 26, 1933 – April 27, 2019) was an American criminal defense attorney who specialized in death penalty litigation. Gessler worked as a deputy public defender for the Los Angeles County Public Defender's office for thirty-two years. Gessler handled several high-profile cases, including representing Lyle Menendez, G. Gordon Liddy and Vaughn Greenwood.

== Legal career ==
Gessler graduated from USC Gould School of Law in 1961, he then worked for two years as a deputy district attorney in Los Angeles County, and two years in private practice with friends from law school.

=== Public Defender's Office ===
In 1965, Gessler joined the public defender's office. He worked at branch offices in Torrance and Compton. He began working at the Clara Shortridge Foltz Criminal Justice Center in 1984.

==== High-profile cases ====
He represented G. Gordon Liddy who was accused of breaking into Daniel Ellsberg's psychiatrist's office in 1972. He also represented Vaughn Greenwood, who was accused of killing nine people, who he kept off California's death row.

After the first trials of Lyle and Erik Menendez ended in mistrials, Gessler was appointed to represent Lyle Menendez. At the conclusion of the penalty phase of the second trial, the jury recommended life in prison instead of the death penalty which the prosecution sought.

== Awards and recognition ==
- In 1996, Gessler received the Significant Contributions to Criminal Justice Award from the California Attorneys for Criminal Justice
- In 2003, Gessler received the Reginald Heber Smith Award from the National Legal Aid & Defender Association for outstanding achievement to an indigent criminal defense organization.
