= Edmund D. Edelman Children's Court =

Los Angeles County Superior Court in California, US

Coordinates: 34.058023°N 118.166727°W

- Interactive map of the Edmund D. Edelman Children's Court area

General information
- Location: 201 Centre Plaza Drive; Monterey Park, California, United States
- Opening: 1992

Technical details
- Floor count: 6

Website
- www.lacourt.ca.gov/apps/courthouse/ccj/detail

Edmund D. Edelman Children's Court is a Los Angeles County Superior Court in Monterey Park, California, United States. This court handles all of the juvenile dependency cases in Los Angeles County. The court is named after former member of the Los Angeles County Board of Supervisors Edmund D. Edelman.

Social workers from the Department of Children and Family Services (Los Angeles County) investigate child welfare concerns in the county. The building houses attorneys from Los Angeles County Counsel, Los Angeles Dependency Lawyers, and Children's Law Center.

In 2012, the media gained unprecedented access to the court. At that time, about 25,000 cases annually went before the combined 21 judges, commissioners and referees who oversee the cases.
