= Thomas D. Lyon =

- Occupation: Judge Edward J. Ruey L. Guiardo Chair in Law in Psychology at the University of Southern California Gould School of Law
- Awards: American Psychology Association Award for Outstanding Dissertation in Developmental Psychology, 1995 American Professional Society on this Abseils of Children William Friedrich Memorial Award, 2008 American Professional Society on the Abuse of Children Outstanding Research Career Achievement Award, 2014

Academic background
- Education: Dartmouth College (B.A.) Harvard Law School (J.D.) Stanford University (PhD.)

Academic work
- Discipline: Psychologist
- Sub-discipline: Child Forensic Interviewing
- Institutions: University of Southern California

Thomas D. Lyon is the Judge Edward J. Ruey L. Guiardo Chair in Law in Psychology at the University of Southern California Gould School of Law. He created USC's Child Interviewing Lab in 2008, where he conducts forensic interviews and research with children who are alleging sexual abuse. He is also a professor of Evidence and the Child Interviewing Practicum where students learn how to interview child witnesses. Previous to joining the USC Law faculty in 1995, he was an attorney for the Department of Children and Family Services for Los Angeles County where he worked with children who were removed from their families due to exposure to neglect or familial abuse.

Lyon's research focuses on identifying productive ways to interview children in and out of the courtroom who have witnessed violence or experienced trauma. He has designed his research to try and mitigate between over-questioning children, which can leave room for leading questions, suggestibility, and false confessions, and not questioning them thoroughly enough to understand a child's full story before moving forward with a claim or allegation.

== Education ==
Thomas Lyon graduated magna cum laude from Dartmouth College with bachelor's degree in English in 1983. He went on to Harvard Law School, where he also graduated magna cum laude in 1987. Lyon then got his Ph.D. in 1994 in developmental psychology from Stanford University, under the advisement of John F. Flavell.

== Career ==
Lyon completed his Juris Doctor at Stanford in 1987 and became an attorney for the Department of Children and Family Services for Los Angeles County. There, he worked with children who had been removed from their homes due to parental neglect and abuse. In 1995 Lyon joined the University of Southern California Law faculty, where he became the Judge Edward J. and Ruey L. Guiardo Chair in Law in Psychology for the Gould School of Law. At USC, he also teaches the Evidence and Child Interviewing Practicum, and directs the Child Interviewing Lab.

== Research ==
Lyon's goal with the research he conducts at the Child Interviewing Lab is to identify productive ways of interviewing children who have experienced abuse, or have witnessed violence. Minimizing suggestibility during these interviews with children, while still making the sessions valuable, is what he is hoping to accomplish; this work can be seen through his study "Increasing True Reports Without Increasing False Reports: Best Practice Interviewing Methods and Open-Ended WH- Questions." He conducts interviews with the children participating in the lab himself, as well as teaches others how to effectively interview children.

Lyon has received over $8 million in research grants since 1994, and has received multiple training and service grants from the Child Advocacy Center Program. He has since been published in many studies regarding how to retrieve honest and accurate information from a child who have experienced a form of maltreatment, as tested in "Attorneys' Questions and Children's Productivity in Child Sexual Abuse Criminal Trials," His publications also include topics of "Interviewing Children in and out of Court.", how a child's story can change as tested in "Filial Dependency and Recantation of Child Sexual Abuse Allegations," and healing children from different forms of maltreatment found in the "Report of the APSAC task force on attachment therapy, reactive attachment disorder, and attachment problems." .

== Awards ==
- American Psychology Association Award for Outstanding Dissertation in Developmental Psychology, 1995
- USC Mellon Mentoring Award, 2005
- American Professional Society on this Abseils of Children William Friedrich Memorial Award, 2008
- USC Provost's Mentoring Award, 2014
- USC Law School Rutter Teaching Award, 2014
- American Professional Society on the Abuse of Children Outstanding Research Career Achievement Award, 2014
