= Los Angeles County Employees Retirement Association =

Independent agency to administer retirement pensions

Los Angeles County Employees Retirement Association LACERA
Agency overview
- Formed: January 1, 1938 (88 years ago)
- Headquarters: 300 N. Lake Ave. Pasadena, CA
- Agency executives: Santos H. Kreimann, Chief Executive Officer; Luis A. Lugo, Deputy Chief Executive Officer; Jonathan Grabel, Chief Investment Officer; Jude Perez, Deputy Chief Investment Officer; Laura Guglielmo, Asst. Executive Officer; JJ Popowich, Asst. Executive Officer; Steve P. Rice, Chief Counsel
- Website: lacera.gov

The Los Angeles County Employees Retirement Association (LACERA) is an independent Los Angeles County agency that administers and manages the retirement fund for the County and outside Districts (Little Lake Cemetery District, Local Agency Formation Commission for the County of Los Angeles, Los Angeles County Office of Education, and South Coast Air Quality Management District). In 2024, it managed defined benefit pension plans for 198,647 civil servants (members), including 56,752 retirees and 10,0611 survivors, making it the largest county retirement system in the United States. In 2018, LACERA's net assets were worth US$79.8 billion.

== History ==
LACERA was established on January 1, 1938, following passage of the County Employees Retirement Law of 1937 (CERL), which mandates LACERA to pay for the defined retirement benefits of Los Angeles County employees and their beneficiaries. In 1971, LACERA began administering a retiree healthcare benefits program.

== Management ==
LACERA is governed by two Boards:

- Board of Retirement: composed of 12 trustees, responsible for the overall management of the retirement system)
- Board of Investments: composed of 10 trustees, responsible for establishing LACERA's investment policy and objectives, and exercising authority and control over the investment management of the Fund.

Day-to-day management and operation of LACERA is delegated to a Chief Executive Officer, who is appointed by both Boards.

=== Board of Retirement ===
The Board of Retirement (BOR) administers the retirement system, the retiree healthcare program, and the review and processing of disability retirement applications.

The Board of Retirement's members are appointed as follows:

- Four members – appointed by the Los Angeles County Board of Supervisors
- Two members – elected by general members
- One member and one alternate – elected by safety members
- One member and one alternate – elected by retired members
- One member – the Los Angeles County Treasurer and Tax Collector, who serves as an ex officio member, as required by California law
- One member – the Los Angeles County Chief Deputy Treasurer and Tax Collector, who serves as an acting ex officio member, as required by California law

The Board of Retirement meets at 9 a.m. on the first Wednesday of each month.

=== Board of Investments ===
The Board of Investments (BOI) establishes LACERA's investment policy and objectives and exercises authority and control over the investment management of the pension and benefit trust.

The Board of Investments’ members are appointed as follows:

- Four members – appointed by the Los Angeles County Board of Supervisors
- Two members – elected by general members
- One member – elected by safety members
- One member – elected by retired members
- One member – the Los Angeles County Treasurer and Tax Collector, who serves as an ex-officio member, as required by California law
- One member – the Los Angeles County Chief Deputy Treasurer and Tax Collector, who serves as an ex-officio member, as required by California law

The Board of Investments meets at 9 a.m. on the second Wednesday of each month.

== Benefits ==
=== Health care benefits ===
LACERA provides health insurance plans for its retired members. LACERA covers 100% of healthcare premiums (up to the benchmark rate) for Los Angeles County retirees who have at least 25 years of public service. For members with 10 years of public service, LACERA contributes 40% of health care plan premiums, with an additional contribution of 4% for each additional year worked.

=== Retirement plans ===
LACERA offers two tracks of retirement plans, for general members (civil servants) and for safety members (safety employees, including sheriff deputies and firefighters), further subdivided as follows:

Plan Name	Category	Open Date	Close Date	Notes
Plan A	General Members	-	August 31, 1977	
Plan B	General Members	September 1, 1977	September 30, 1978	
Plan C	General Members	October 1, 1978	May 31, 1979	
Plan D	General Members	June 1, 1979	December 31, 2012	
Plan E	General Members	January 4, 1982	November 27, 2012	Non-contributory plan
Plan G	General Members	January 1, 2013	-	Established in response to the California Public Employees’ Pension Reform Act of 2013 (PEPRA)
Plan A	Safety Members	-	August 31, 1977	
Plan B	Safety Members	September 1, 1977	December 31, 2012	
Plan C	Safety Members	January 1, 2013	-	Established in response to PEPRA

== Finances ==
As of June 30, 2024, LACERA's net assets were worth US$79.2 billion, an increase of $5.4 billion, or 7.2%, from the prior year. The latest actuarial valuation on June 30, 2024, determined that LACERA had a funded ratio of actuarial assets to the actuarial accrued liability of 79.9%, from the prior year. For fiscal year (FY) 2023–24, LACERA's fiscal-year-to-date return on investments was 0.91%; the FY 2022-23 return was 6.40%.

Historically, investment earnings have accounted for about 70% of the money necessary to pay the promised benefits.

== Reciprocity ==
LACERA has reciprocity with the other California public retirement systems, including:

- California Public Employees’ Retirement System (CalPERS)
- Judges' Retirement System
- LA County Metropolitan Transportation Authority Retirement System
- Los Angeles City Employees’ Retirement System (LACERS)
- 19 CERL Counties (county retirement systems established County Employees Retirement Law)

LACERA also recognizes other California public agencies and districts, cities, counties, school districts, superintendents of schools and others that are covered by CalPERS, including the California State Teachers' Retirement System (CalSTRS) and University of California Retirement Plan (UCRP).

== Corporate Governance ==
LACERA is one of eight institutional investors represented by the Shareholder Rights Projects, which worked to present shareholder declassification proposals in S&P 500 annual meetings.

== See also ==
- Government of Los Angeles County
- Los Angeles County Board of Supervisors
