= Los Angeles County Public Defender =

Legal assistance provider

Los Angeles County Public Defender's Office

Agency overview
- Formed: 1913
- Type: Public defender
- Jurisdiction: Los Angeles County
- Agency executives: Ricardo García, LA County Public defender; Justine Esack, Chief Deputy; John Mathews, Chief of Staff
- Website: pubdef.lacounty.gov

The Los Angeles County Public Defender's (LACPD) office is an agency of the government of Los Angeles County. LACPD was the first public defender agency in the United States. The current public defender is Ricardo García.

It provides legal assistance to individuals charged with a crime in state court who are financially unable to retain private counsel. The LACPD system is the largest public defender agency in the United States. The Alternate Public Defender (APD) and LACPD combined have over one thousand attorneys as well as support staff consisting of paralegals, investigators, social workers, and others.

== History ==
At the Chicago World's Fair in 1893, during a "Congress" of the Board of Lady Managers, Clara Shortridge Foltz made her first highly public presentation of her idea of the public defender. Then, due to Foltz's persistent efforts over a period of several years, Los Angeles County established a public defender office in 1913 under its county charter. The Los Angeles County Board of Supervisors appointed the first Public Defender in the United States, Walton J. Wood. The original staff consisted of Wood, four deputies and a secretary.

In June 1915, the Los Angeles City Council created the City Police Court Defender and appointed James H. Pope to handle the defense in misdemeanor cases. The City Public Defender handled Municipal Court filings, including felony preliminary hearings, while the County Public Defender handled felony cases in Superior Court.

From 1921 to 1927, William Tell Aggeler served as the Chief Public Defender. Judge Aggeler was an important figure in the early development of public defender's office. Frederic H. Vercoe was the Chief Public Defender from 1927 to 1946. William B. Neeley served as the head defender from 1946 - 1949. Ellery E. Cuff ran the office from 1949 until 1963. During Cuff's time with the office, the office consisted of 65 attorneys who handled 1,200 cases each year on an annual budget of $950,000.

From 1963 until 1967, Erling J. Hovden was the Public Defender. In 1965, the City Public Defender merged into the county office, with the one office handling misdemeanors, felonies, juvenile cases, mental health cases and some civil cases. Richard S. Buckley served as the Public Defender from 1967 until 1976.

In 1976, Wilbur F. Littlefield took over as the Public Defender. He had been with the office since the 1950s. Littlefield was known for his defense of death penalty cases. Littlefield also refused to accept an excessive workload on behalf of the office. In 1994, Michael P. Judge was appointed Public Defender. In 2011, Ronald Brown took over as the Public Defender. In 2017, Kelly Emling became the Acting Public Defender.

== Notable attorneys ==
- Tiffiny Blacknell
- Ricardo García
- Charles Gessler
- Eyvin Hernandez

== Alternate Public Defender ==
In 1993, the Los Angeles County Board of Supervisors created the Alternate Public Defender's (APD) Office in order to curb the costs in cases where the Public Defender had a conflict of interest. Bruce Hoffman was appointed the first Alternate Public Defender and upon his retirement in 2002 was succeeded by his then Chief Deputy Janice Fukai.

== Locations ==
The Public Defender offices in Los Angeles County include: Los Angeles International Airport, in Alhambra, Bellflower, Burbank, Chatsworth, Clara Shortridge Foltz Criminal Justice Center, Compton, Downey, East Los Angeles, El Monte, Glendale, Inglewood, Lancaster, Lomita, Long Beach, Norwalk, Pasadena, Pomona, San Fernando, Santa Clarita, Torrance, Van Nuys, and West Covina.
