= Los Angeles County Superior Court =

Trial court in California

Superior Court of California, County of Los Angeles
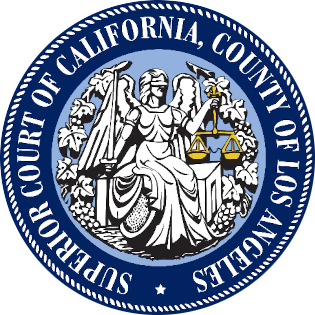
- Seal of the Superior Court of California, County of Los Angeles

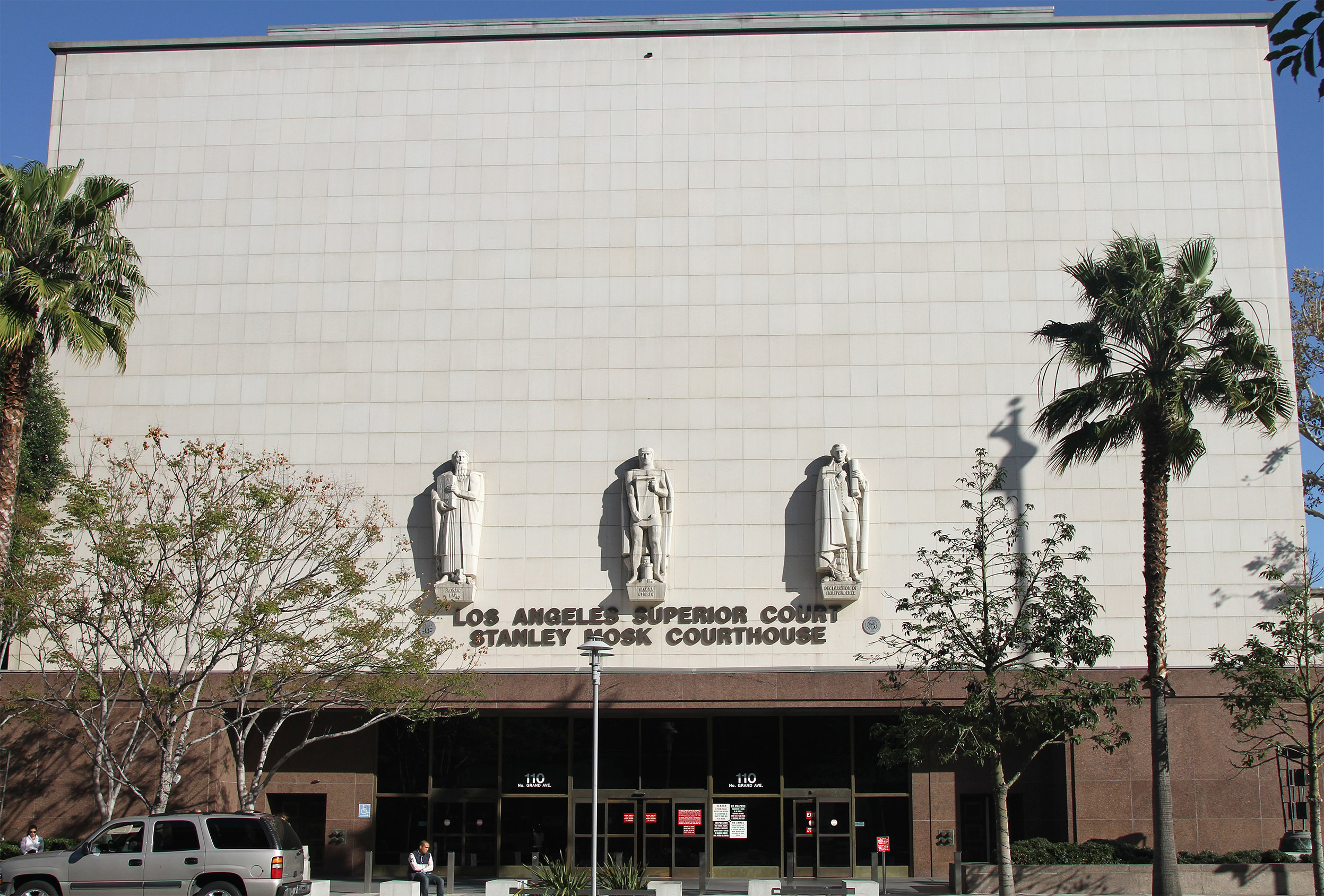
- Stanley Mosk Courthouse, Grand Ave entrance

Superior Court overview
- Jurisdiction: Government of California; Los Angeles County
- Superior Court executives: Sergio C. Tapia II, Presiding Judge; David W. Slayton, Executive Officer/Clerk
- Website: lacourt.ca.gov

The Superior Court of California, County of Los Angeles, informally known as the Los Angeles County Superior Court, is the California Superior Court with jurisdiction over Los Angeles County. It is the largest single unified trial court in the United States.

The Superior Court operates 36 courthouses throughout the county. Currently, Sergio C. Tapia II serves as Presiding Judge and David W. Slayton serves as Executive Officer/Clerk of Court. They, together with 583 judicial officers and 4,800 employees, operate the nearly 600 courtrooms throughout the county, with an annual budget of over $1 billion.

== History ==
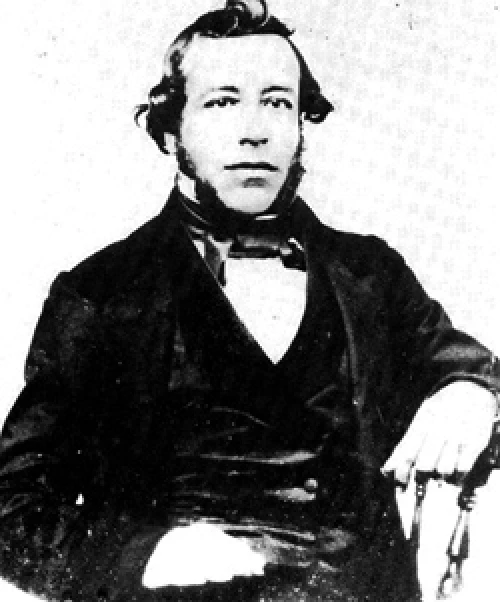
Californio judge and politician Agustín Olvera served as L.A.'s first Judge of the Los Angeles County Court. He held L.A.'s first county court sessions in his house on Olvera Street, since named after him.

When California declared its statehood in 1849 and became a part of the United States, the first California Constitution authorized the legislature to establish municipal and such other courts as it deemed necessary. The 1851 California Judiciary Act divided the state into districts, placing Los Angeles, San Bernardino, and San Diego counties into one district. Each district had its own court, below which were County and then Justice of the Peace Courts. Judge Agustín Olvera of the County Court and Judge Jonathan R. Scott of the Justice of the Peace Court were the first judges of these lower courts. Almost immediately the District Court system was burdened by the vast expanse of the district. District Judges were required to hold court proceedings where the cases were filed. Because of the distance District Court Judges had to travel to conduct trials and the sudden growth in population due to the California Gold Rush, the District Court system became ineffective and non-responsive to the needs of its constituency.

In 1879 California adopted a new constitution and with it a revised court system. The District Courts became appeals courts below the State Supreme Court. To take over the District Courts original function, the county Superior Courts were created. The new Superior Court of Los Angeles County began with two judges: Ygnacio Sepulveda and Volney E. Howard. In 1905, juvenile delinquency and dependency hearings were put under the Superior Court's jurisdiction, as were mental health hearings in 1914. Eventually the Superior Court's jurisdiction came to include all civil, felony criminal, family law, juvenile delinquency and dependency, and probate cases in the county.

Throughout its history the Superior Court had had a close relation with the county's many Municipal Courts. By 1971 the Superior Court assumed responsibility for coordinating, providing and scheduling court interpreters for all courts in the County and by 1973 the Court had implemented a county wide system to process the payment of court appointed attorneys. The following year, 1974, all jury services in the county had been consolidated. In 1986 county-wide uniform criminal Local Court rules and uniform exhibit processing procedures were adopted to ensure consistency in how criminal cases were handled through the court system. By 1988 the Municipal and Superior Courts began to cross-assign cases to ease the county's judicial backlog. In 1993 the Superior Court adopted the Municipal Courts' automated criminal case processing system; known as the Municipal Court Information it was rebranded the Trial Court Information System. Also in 1993 the Superior Court was administratively unified with several of the Municipal Courts. And by 1999 17 more Municipal Courts had joined. Finally on January 22, 2000, in accordance with Proposition 220 passed in 1998, the Judges of the Municipal and Superior Courts voted to merge into the Superior Court of California, County of Los Angeles.

In 2000, a pilot Complex Civil Litigation Program was established in the Los Angeles Superior Court, which has since been made permanent.

== Courthouses ==
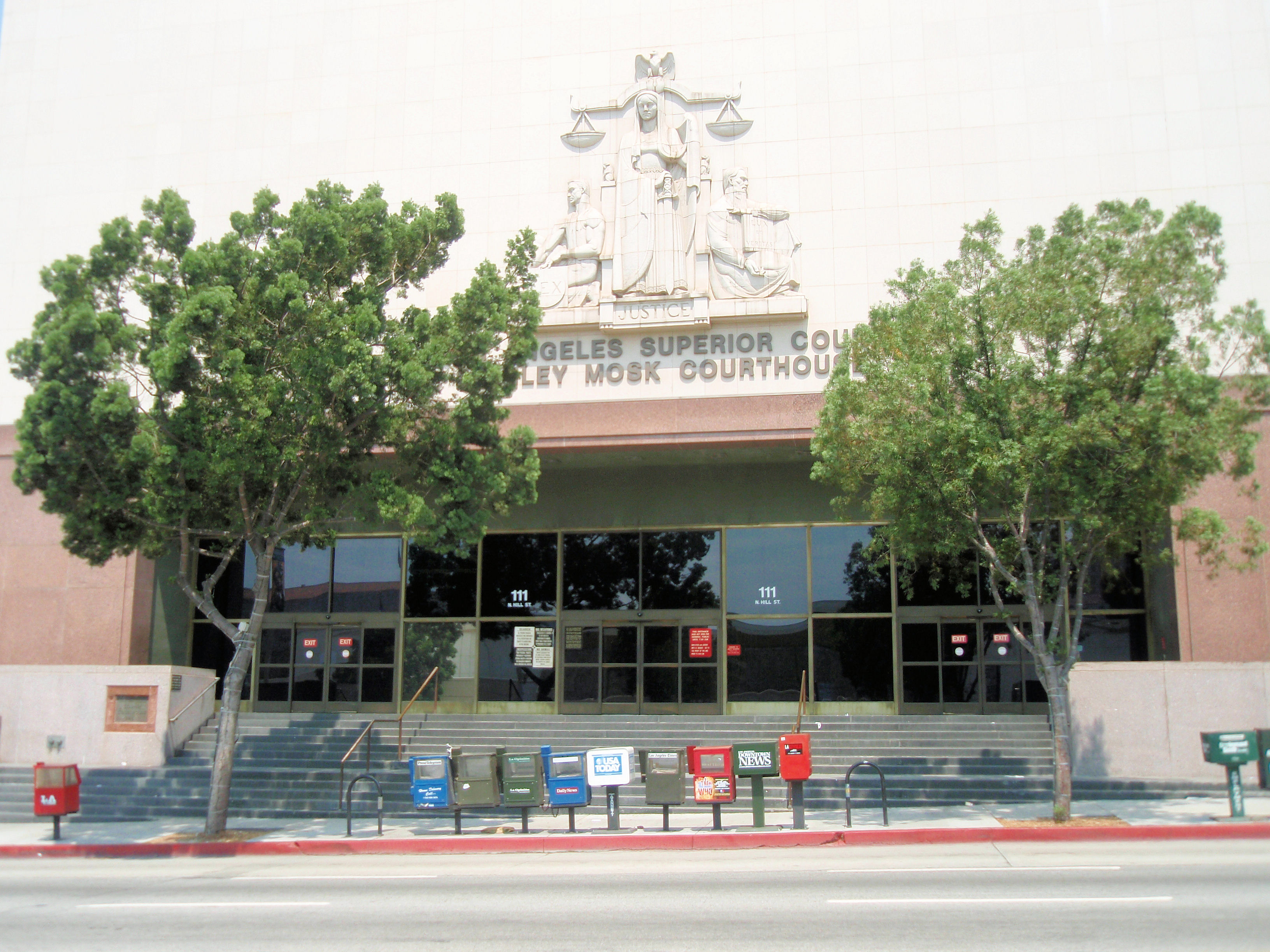
The Hill St entrance to the Stanley Mosk Courthouse

Los Angeles County Superior Court locations:
1 Airport, 11701 S. La Cienega (Los Angeles)
2 Alfred J. McCourtney Juvenile Justice, 1040 W. Ave J (Lancaster)
3 Alhambra, 150 W Commonwealth
4 Bellflower, 10025 E Flower St
5 Beverly Hills, 9355 Burton Way
6 Burbank, 300 E Olive
7 Chatsworth, 9425 Penfield Ave
8 Clara Shortridge Foltz Criminal Justice Center, 210 W Temple St (Los Angeles)
Spring Street Courthouse, 312 N Spring St
Stanley Mosk Courthouse, 111 N Hill St
9 Compton, 200 W Compton Blvd
10 Downey, 7500 E Imperial Hwy
11 East Los Angeles, 4848 E Civic Center Way
12 Eastlake Juvenile, 1601 Eastlake Ave (Los Angeles)
13 Edmund D. Edelman Children's Court, 201 Centre Plaza Dr (Monterey Park)
14 El Monte, 11234 E Valley Blvd
15 Glendale, 600 E Broadway
16 Gov. George Deukmeijian Courthouse, 275 Magnolia (Long Beach)
17 Hollywood, 5925 Hollywood Blvd
18 Inglewood, One Regent St &
Inglewood Juvenile, 110 Regent St (Inglewood)
19 Metropolitan, 1945 S Hill St (Los Angeles)
20 Michael D. Antonovich Antelope Valley, 42011 4th St W (Lancaster)
21 Norwalk, 12720 Norwalk Blvd
22 Pasadena, 300 E Walnut St
23 Pomona South, 400 Civic Center Plaza
24 Sylvmar Juvenile, 16350 Filbert St (Sylmar)
25 Torrance, 825 Maple Ave
26 Van Nuys East, 6230 Sylmar Ave &
Van Nuys West, 14400 Erwin St Mall
27 West Covina, 1427 W Covina Pkwy
28 Whittier, 7339 S Painter Ave

=== General ===
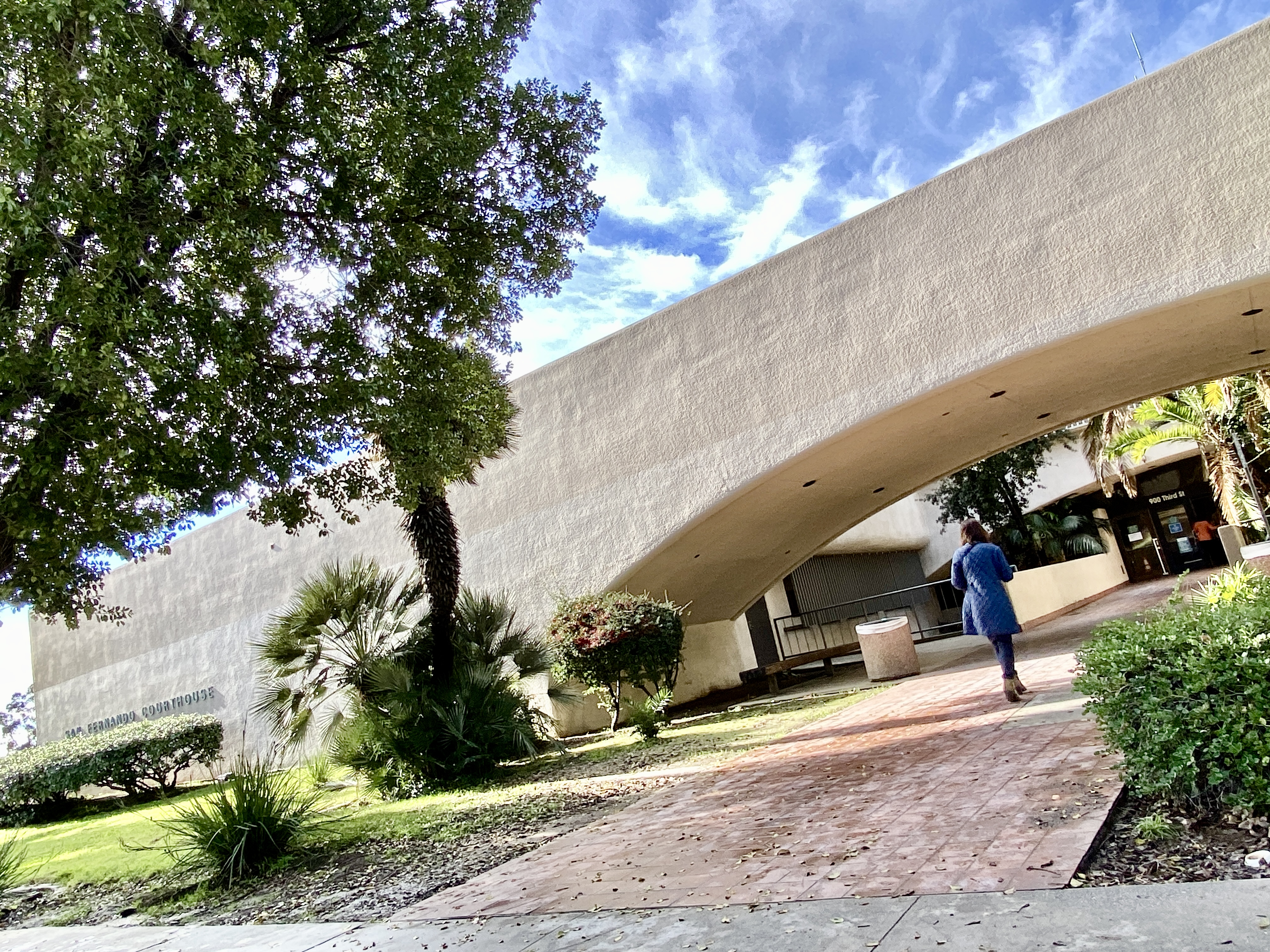
San Fernando Courthouse

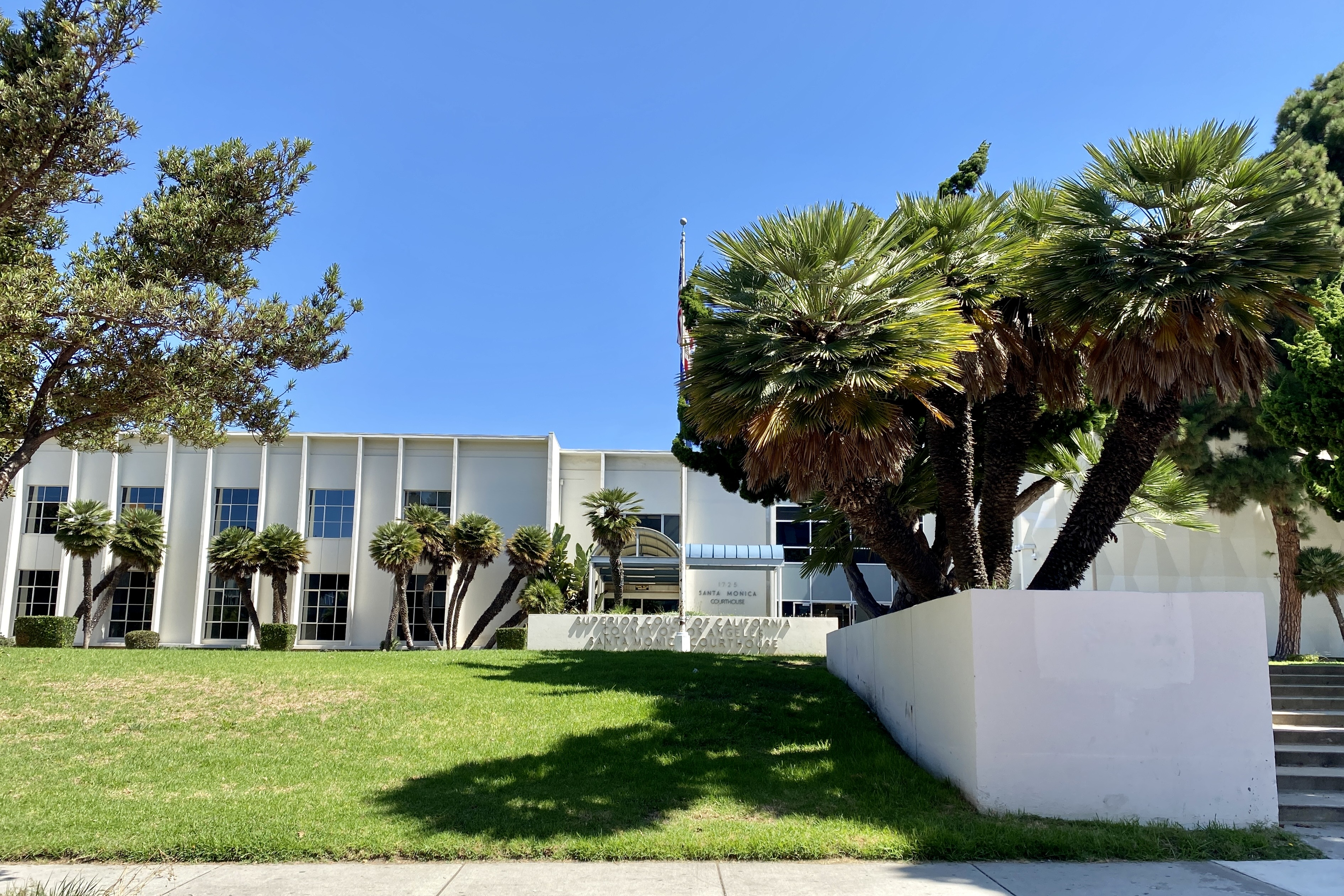
Santa Monica Courthouse

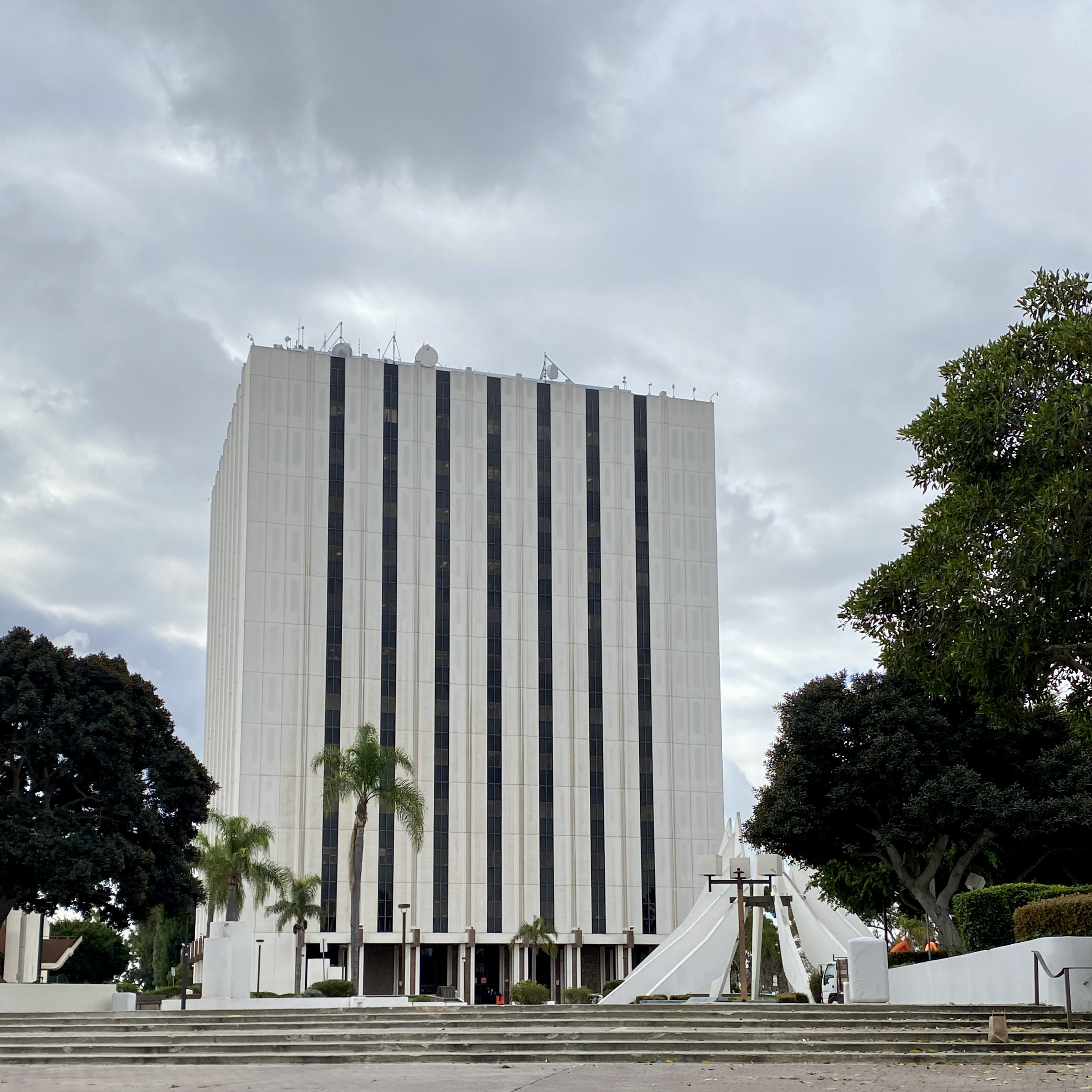
Compton Courthouse

- Alhambra Courthouse, First Street and Commonwealth Avenue
- Airport Courthouse, 105 and 405 freeway intersection
- Catalina Courthouse, Catalina Island, smallest, one part-time courtroom
- Bellflower Courthouse
- Beverly Hills Courthouse
- Burbank Courthouse
- Chatsworth Courthouse
- Compton Courthouse
- Downey Courthouse
- East Los Angeles Courthouse
- El Monte Courthouse
- Glendale Courthouse
- Hollywood Courthouse
- Huntington Park Courthouse
- Inglewood Courthouse
- Long Beach Courthouse
- Malibu Courthouse
- Metropolitan Courthouse
- Michael D. Antonovich Antelope Valley Courthouse
- Norwalk Courthouse
- Pasadena Courthouse
- Pomona Courthouse North
- Pomona Courthouse South
- Redondo Beach Courthouse
- San Fernando Courthouse
- San Pedro Courthouse
- San Pedro Courthouse Annex
- Santa Clarita Courthouse
- Santa Monica Courthouse
- Stanley Mosk Courthouse, Downtown Los Angeles, 100 courtrooms, largest courthouse in the United States
- Torrance Courthouse
- Van Nuys Courthouse East
- Van Nuys Courthouse West
- West Covina Courthouse
- West Los Angeles Courthouse
- Whittier Courthouse

=== Specialty ===
- Alfred J. McCourtney Juvenile Justice Center
- Central Arraignment Court
- Central Civil West Courthouse
- Clara Shortridge Foltz Criminal Justice Center
- David V. Kenyon Juvenile Justice Center
- Eastlake Juvenile Court
- Edmund D. Edelman Children's Court
- Inglewood Juvenile Courthouse
- Los Padrinos Juvenile Courthouse
- Mental Health Courthouse
- Sylmar Juvenile Courthouse

== Administration ==
The Court uses the California Court Case Management System (CCMS) v3, and exposes services to the public such as the Criminal Defendant Index, Civil Party Name Search, Civil Case Document Images, Traffic Ticket Online Services, e-File Small Claims, and Divorce Judgment Documents. The difference between CCMS and these other services is similar to the difference between the federal CM/ECF and PACER systems.

The Court has nearly 4,800 employees, operates nearly 600 courtrooms throughout the county, and has an annual budget of $1 billion. The Court has 2.7 million new cases each year:

- 1.7 million traffic tickets
- About 500,000 criminal cases
- Nearly 120,000 family law cases
- Over 150,000 civil lawsuits

Pursuant to California Government Code and the California Rules of Court, the Los Angeles County Superior Court has adopted Local Rules for its government and the government of its officers. The Presiding Judge assigns cases to departments and judges to departments. Nominations and election of the Presiding and Assistant Presiding Judge are made by all judges and take place between September and October of each year. All departments are divided into several principal divisions under the policy and procedures established by its supervising judge, subject to the approval of the Executive Committee and the Presiding Judge.

== Officers ==
There are several officers of the court, including judges, jurors, commissioners, prosecutors, defense attorneys, clerks, bailiffs, and court reporters.

=== Jurors ===
- 3.1 million of the County's residents are called for jury duty each year
- 1 million people became qualified jurors
- Between 7,000 to 10,000 people serve as jurors every day
- Over 5,500 jury trials are held each year
- Average length of a trial is about 7 days
- $15 per day and 34 cents per miles (one way) compensation after the first day
- 18 years of age or older, citizen of the United States and a resident of Los Angeles County are minimum requirements

=== Judges ===
The state Administrative Office of the Courts maintains an official roster of all superior court judges, including the 431 judges of the L.A. Superior Court. Median spending for a judicial office election for the Los Angeles County Superior Court has risen from $3,177 in 1970 to $70,000 in 1994. Notable judges:

- Lee Smalley Edmon, Presiding Judge
- David S. Cunningham III
- James Hahn
- Shirley Hufstedler
- Lance Ito
- Joyce Karlin
- William B. Keene
- Roberto Longoria
- Loren Miller (1903–1967)
- Loren Miller Jr.
- Billy G. Mills
- Lawrence Mira
- Michael T. Sauer
- Robert Mitsuhiro Takasugi (1930–2009)
- Joseph Wapner

=== Commissioners ===
A commissioner is a subordinate judicial officer elected by the judges of the Court and given the power to hear and make decisions in certain kinds of legal matters, similar to the United States magistrate judge. Their jurisdiction includes, but is not limited to, traffic matters, family law and juvenile cases, criminal misdemeanors, and criminal felony cases through the preliminary hearing stage. There are 140 commissioners.

=== Prosecutors ===
The Los Angeles County District Attorney, currently Nathan Hochman, prosecutes crimes before the court on behalf of California, Los Angeles County, and all cities and special districts within Los Angeles County.

=== Public Defenders ===
The Los Angeles County Public Defender, currently Ricardo Garcia, is the public defender.

=== Clerks ===
The court clerks, or Judicial Assistants, are responsible for managing the courtrooms and other clerical courtroom activities, interacting with the attorneys and the public, administering oaths, assisting with the impaneling juries, and are responsible for the inventory and safe-keeping of the exhibits. The current Clerk is David W. Slayton.

=== Bailiffs ===
The functions of the bailiff are carried out by Los Angeles County Sheriff, currently Robert Luna, under contract.

== Notable cases ==
- Hillside Strangler
- Charles Manson murders
- O. J. Simpson murder case
- The Onion Field
- Paul v. Clinton
- Phil Spector murder of Lana Clarkson
- Lee Marvin palimony case
- Trial of Conrad Murray (Michael Jackson's last doctor)

== See also ==
- Superior Courts of California
  - Santa Clara County Superior Court
  - Sacramento County Superior Court
  - Alameda County Superior Court
