= Ricardo García (attorney) =

American criminal defense attorney

- Born: Los Angeles, California
- Education: Santa Monica High School; University of California, Santa Cruz (B.A.); UC Berkeley School of Law (J.D.)
- Occupations: Public Defender for Los Angeles County; criminal defense attorney

Ricardo García is an American criminal defense attorney. Garcia is currently the public defender for the Los Angeles County Public Defender's office, the largest public defender's office in the United States. Garcia is Los Angeles County's eleventh Public Defender and LA County's first Latino Public Defender.

Garcia has served as an adjunct professor at California Western School of Law and on the faculty at the Shechmeister Death Penalty College at Santa Clara University.

== Early life and education ==
García was born in Los Angeles to immigrant parents from Mexico, and is the oldest of seven children and the first generation college graduate. He received his Juris Doctor in 1995 from the University of California, Berkeley, School of Law, and his Bachelor of Art in Politics in 1991 at the University of California, Santa Cruz. He began his legal career in 1995 with the San Diego Public Defender's Office.

== Legal career ==
=== San Diego County Public Defender's Office ===
After law school, he started working in the San Diego County Public Defender's office in 1995. During his time in San Diego, Mr. Garcia was recruited to the Alternate Public Defender and then recruited to the Multiple Conflicts/Major Cases office as the youngest lawyer to join that homicide and capital litigation team.

Garcia handled several high-profile cases while in the San Diego County Public Defender's Office. He represented Nathaniel Gann who was accused of conspiring with his sister to kill her stepfather. Gann was ultimately convicted of first degree murder and sentenced to 25 years to life in prison. The case gained international exposure through its feature on "48 Hours Mystery" and ABC's Driven to Kill TV show, significantly enhancing Garcia's visibility on a global scale.

Garcia represented Jorge Rojas Lopez an alleged member of Los Palillos, a group operating within San Diego with ties to Tijuana Cartel. In the case, the district attorney was seeking the death penalty. During the guilt phase, Rojas was convicted of only 4 of the 9 charged homicides. During the penalty phase, the jury deadlocked on whether to impose the death penalty. After the hung jury, he ultimately pleaded guilty to unresolved counts in exchange for avoiding the death penalty. The trial lasted nearly fifteen months, making it the longest criminal jury trial in the history in the State of California.

=== American Civil Liberties Union ===
From 2004 to 2006, Garcia served as the Criminal Justice Director for the American Civil Liberties Union of Southern California, where he was responsible for monitoring the consent decree with the Los Angeles Police Department as well as conditions within the L.A. County jails. Garcia was also responsible for developing and implementing criminal justice policy and practice for the ACLU. He Also litigated before the 9th Circuit Court of Appeals representing state prisoners.

=== Los Angeles County Public Defender ===
In 2018, Garcia was selected by the Los Angeles County Board of Supervisors to be the Public Defender for Los Angeles County. Garcia is the first Latino and youngest appointed Public Defender in the county."

When California Governor Gavin Newsom imposed a moratorium on the death penalty, Garcia supported the move. He wrote: "The governor’s decision brings California closer to ending the death penalty, a deeply flawed and racially biased system that fails to improve public safety." In 2020, Mr. Garcia launched the Strategic Initiative Plan, which implemented the department's first strategic plan in over two decades. Mr. García is a strong advocate in the fabric of the community and known as a noteworthy leader in the field of criminal defense.

== Awards ==
- Trial Lawyer of the Year by the San Diego Criminal Defense Bar Association (2015)
- Dale Melvin Ray Memorial Award for Excellence in the Representation of the Indigent by San Diego County's Department of the Alternate Public Defender
