= Los Angeles County Assessor =

Government officer for taxable property

Office overview
- Jurisdiction: Los Angeles County
- Headquarters: Kenneth Hahn Hall of Administration, Los Angeles, California; 34.057033°N 118.246261°W
- Employees: 1,200 (2021)
- Annual budget: US$200 million (2021)
- Office executive: Jeffrey Prang, County Assessor
- Website: assessor.lacounty.gov

The Los Angeles County Assessor is the assessor and officer of the government of Los Angeles County responsible for discovering all taxable property in Los Angeles County, except for state-assessed property, to inventory and list all the taxable property, to value the property, and to enroll the property on the local assessment roll. In 2021, there were 2.6 million assessed properties for a total Los Angeles County property assessment value of US$1.8 trillion.

The current assessor is Jeffrey Prang. The most recent assessors have been John Noguez, Robert Quon, who served for the last year of Rick Auerbach's term, and Kenneth P. Hahn.

== Assessments ==
The Assessor is responsible for discovering all taxable property in Los Angeles County, except for state-assessed property, to inventory and list all the taxable property, to value the property, and to enroll the property on the local assessment roll. It is then the responsibility of the Los Angeles County Treasurer and Tax Collector to bill and collect these taxes, and the responsibility of the Los Angeles County Auditor-Controller to allocate the taxes to the appropriate taxing jurisdictions such as the County, cities, schools and special districts within the County.

In 2021 there were 2.6 million assessed properties for a total Los Angeles County property assessment value of nearly US$1.8 trillion.

The Assessor sells the following cadastral electronic documents and databases pursuant to Article 1 of the Constitution (the "Sunshine Amendment") and the California Public Records Act:

Item	Maximum CD/DVD Cost	Maximum Paper Cost
Los Angeles County Parcel Boundary Map (in Shapefile format)	$6	
Apartment House Listing	$478	
Cross Reference Roll	$329	$4 per page
Local Roll	$329	$8 per page
Unsecured Roll	$329	$4 per page
Publicly Owned Parcels	$478	
Secured Basic File Abstract	$12,914	$4,000

== Corruption ==
In mid-2012, Noguez took a leave of absence because of an investigation concerning influence peddling at his office, and on October 17, 2012, he was arrested and charged with 24 felonies relating to corruption.

Assessor Jeffrey Prang's office was found liable in a March 2026 civil trial for providing tax breaks to LA Official's associates. Court documents show several groups and individuals, including the brother of Los Angeles County Supervisor Kathryn Barger and a member of the Glendale City Council, the Rand Corp., Apartment Owners Association of Greater Los Angeles, Luxor Properties, Priscilla Box, Paley Center, Isy, LLC, and Sweetzer, Stockton, Dryden, received special treatment.

== List of assessors ==
Name	Term
Antonio F. Coronel	1850–1856
Juan María Sepúlveda	1857-1858
W. W. Maxy	1859-1861
James McManus	1862
G. L. Mix	1863-1865
J. Q. A. Stanley	1866-1867
M. F. Coronel	1868-1869
D. Botiller	1870-1875
A. W. Ryan	1876-1879
J. W. Venable	1880-1882
R. Bilderrain	1883-1886
C. C. Mason	1887-1891
F. Edward Gray	1891-1893
Theodore Summerland	1894-1898
Alexander Goldwell	1898-1901
Benjamin E. Ward	1902-1906
Calvin Hartwell	1906-1910
E. W. Hopkins	1910-1938
John R. Quinn	1938-1962
Philip E. Watson	1963-1977
Alexander Pope	1978-1986
John J. Lynch	1986-1990
Kenneth P. Hahn	1990-2000
Rick Auerbach	2000-2010
Robert Quon	2010
John Noguez	2010-2014
Jeffrey Prang	2014-
