= Killing of Rebekah Baptiste =

American homicide

Rebekah Baptiste
- Born: December 20, 2014
- Died: July 30, 2025 (age 10); Holbrook, Arizona, U.S.
- Cause of death: Homicide (alleged)
- Parents: Richard Baptiste (father); Sandi Hawkins (mother)

Rebekah Baptiste was a 10-year-old American girl who died on July 30, 2025, three days after being found unresponsive and seriously injured in rural Holbrook, Arizona. Her father Richard Baptiste and his fiancée Anicia Woods have been charged with her murder, kidnapping, and abuse.

The Arizona Department of Child Services (DCS) had received at least 12 reports concerning Rebekah and her family before her death. From 2019 to 2024, Rebekah and her two younger brothers lived in foster care until they were returned to their father. In October 2024, Rebekah escaped from her family's apartment in Phoenix and asked for help from a clerk at a gas station, who called 911. She was taken to the hospital for a bloody lip and bruises on her wrists and feet, but her father and Woods claimed her injuries were self-inflicted. The report filed with the DCS was closed a month later, in which it was claimed no evidence of abuse was found.

== Background ==
At least 12 reports to the DCS were made regarding Rebekah's family in her lifetime. The first report is dated to August 29, 2015, detailing concerns about her living conditions and alleged drug use by her parents. This case was never closed. The next report on May 6, 2016, alleged Rebekah was suffering from diaper rash and an untreated ear infection. In August 2018, Phoenix police made their first recorded visit to the family's Phoenix apartment for a welfare check.

On March 14, 2019, DCS received a report of neglect of Rebekah and her two younger siblings, as well as maternal drug use during Rebekah's pregnancy. They were subsequently removed from their parents' home and put in out-of-home care. Another report to the DCS was made on July 26, 2021, regarding Richard Baptiste and his newborn child. This was while Rebekah and her siblings were under the care of the DCS. The investigation led to Richard surrendering his rights over his newborn and the child being placed in foster care. Richard and Woods began their relationship at approximately this time.

Rebekah's school began contacting the DCS in 2023. On November 2, 2023, DCS received a report of a child being scratched on the neck by Woods. They found no evidence of this claim and closed the case. The police returned to the apartment in December 2023 for another welfare check. By January 30, 2024, Rebekah had been returned to her father's custody, and another report of neglect was made to DCS. Yet another police visit and report of a neck scratch on a child attributed to Woods was made on February 13, 2024. Another child's scratched neck was reported on September 13, 2024, this time including allegations of a bump on the head.

On October 17, Rebekah escaped from a second story window in her apartment building in Phoenix and ran barefoot to a gas station. She initially sought help from a homeless person before asking a gas station clerk, who called 911. Rebekah told police officers Woods hit her with a brush and a belt. After being cared for at the Phoenix Children's Hospital, she was returned home and an investigator with the DCS found no evidence of present or future danger. The case was closed on November 18, 2024. Phoenix police investigated allegations of child abuse and neglect in November 2024, but did not bring forward any charges.

On January 18, 2025, a report was made to the DCS alleging Richard would force Rebekah to run as a form of punishment, without allowing her breaks for water. Police returned to the apartment in April, and on May 19 the final report concerning Rebekah was made, alleging spanking as punishment, two months before her death. DCS could not reach the family for their investigation; the couple had moved their family to a remote campsite near Concho in Apache County without running water or electricity. Police recorded evidence of possible sexual assault of a minor during at least one of their visits.

== Death ==
On July 27, 2025, Woods called 911 to report Rebekah was unconscious on the side of the road at the intersection of State Route 77 and U.S. Route 180. Woods claimed a neighbor found Rebekah after she ran away from their campsite, but Richard was unable to provide the name of this neighbor. Rebekah had made attempts to escape on July 9 and 12.

Rebekah was found by police dehydrated and suffering a brain hemorrhage. She was also missing her toenails and clumps of hair, cut, bruised, and burned. The burns were consistent with her skin being used to put out cigarettes. She was initially taken to the Little Colorado Medical Center before being sent to the Phoenix Children's Hospital due to the severity of her condition. Doctors who examined the medical evidence noted extensive injuries to nearly her entire body. Her injuries were in various stages of healing, suggesting they were inflicted over a period of time.

The police interviewed Woods, who claimed she believed Rebekah would be fine. Police showed Richard images of his daughter's injuries, towards which he reportedly expressed no emotion. Richard Baptiste was 32 at the time charges were brought against him, and Anicia Woods was 29. Rebekah's younger brothers, in their interviews on July 28, claimed their parents hit them "a lot" but they were "not allowed to tell people about that".

Rebekah died three days after being found by police, on July 30, 2025, at the Phoenix Children's Hospital. After her death, first-degree murder charges were brought against her father and Woods.

== Trial ==
At Richard Baptiste's preliminary hearing, Deputy Sheriff Kole Soderquist and prosecutor Lacee Collins alleged that Rebekah had been the victim of physical and sexual abuse which amounted to torture. Her autopsy results and official cause of death have not been released. Injuries to her vagina and anus were cited as evidence of sexual abuse, and charges of molestation were added against the couple. Deputy Sheriff Soderquist said police found animal feces and trash on the floor of the yurt in which the family lived at the time of Rebekah's death. Blonde hair and blood were also found on a hairbrush on the campsite.

On September 22, 2025, a judge ruled that Baptiste and Woods would be tried together after it was sought by the prosecution. Their bail was set to $1 million each. The trial was initially set to commence on June 2, 2026, but the court vacated that date due to the autopsy requiring more time to complete because of its exceptional nature. No new date has been decided. Richard and Woods have pled not guilty.

== Aftermath ==
DCS initially disputed the claim by Rebekah's teachers that they had contacted the agency 12 times, claiming they had only ever received 5 hotline calls from the school. DCS later released records of 7 other instances where they had been contacted regarding her family. Rebekah's mother, Sandi Hawkins, has filed a lawsuit with DCS alleging gross negligence resulting in death.

Governor Katie Hobbs announced there would be an investigation into the handling of reports by DCS regarding Rebekah. State Senator Carine Werner has called for legislation to improve the DCS call center following Rebekah's death. The media coverage of the case has focused on the numerous reports made to DCS concerning Rebekah and her family prior to her death, especially the October 2024 incident where she was returned to her alleged abusers after escaping.

A memorial service was held for Rebekah at her school in Phoenix. Among those to speak were Rebekah's teachers Penny Roubison and Phenicia Swalley, and her grandmother, Sondra Hawkins.

== See also ==
- Filicide
- Child murder
- Murder of Gabriel Fernandez
- Murder of Harmony Montgomery
