= Calvin Hartwell =

American politician (1849–1920)

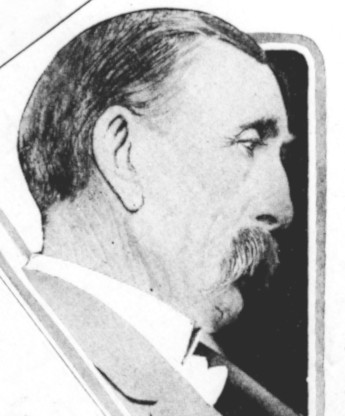
- Hartwell c. 1913

Los Angeles County Assessor
- In office 1906–1910
- Preceded by: Benjamin E. Ward
- Succeeded by: E. W. Hopkins

8th Mayor of Pasadena, California
- In office 1896–1898
- Preceded by: John Samuel Cox
- Succeeded by: George Downing Patten

Personal details
- Born: December 17, 1849 near Sandusky, Ohio, U.S.
- Died: May 19, 1920 (aged 70)
- Party: Republican
- Spouse: Mary L. Hartwell
- Occupation: Politician

Calvin Hartwell (December 17, 1849 – May 19, 1920) was a Republican politician who served as a member of the Pasadena Board of Trustees from 1895 to 1898, Mayor of Pasadena, California from 1896 to 1898, Los Angeles County Assessor from 1906 to 1910, and Los Angeles County Coroner from 1908 to 1920. He was born near Sandusky, Ohio. Following his death on May 19, 1920, Hartwell left his estate, which was worth over $10,000 (equivalent to $345,536 in 2025), to his wife Mary L. Hartwell.
