= Vaughn Greenwood =

American serial killer (1944–2020)

- Born: Vaughn Orrin Greenwood; January 19, 1944; Pennsylvania, U.S.
- Died: December 18, 2020 (aged 76); California Men's Colony, San Luis Obispo, California
- Other name: Skid Row Slasher
- Convictions: Assault; Murder; Attempted murder
- Penalty: Life imprisonment

Details
- Victims: 11 murdered, 1 survivor
- Span of crimes: 1964–1975
- Country: United States
- State: California
- Date apprehended: February 3, 1975

Vaughn Orrin Greenwood (January 19, 1944 – December 18, 2020) was an American serial killer who gained the nickname the Skid Row Slasher. He murdered eleven vagrants in Southern California between November 1964 and January 1975, in addition to a failed twelfth murder that ultimately led to his capture.

== Crimes ==
The first attacks occurred when Greenwood killed two transients in November 1964. A ten-year gap period between murders occurred due to Greenwood being convicted and sentenced due to a knifing assault in Chicago in 1966. He spent five and a half years in jail for this conviction before returning to California. Greenwood continued his murder spree in December 1974 and killed nine victims between December 1974 and February 1975.

Greenwood was convicted of nine counts of murder, including eight of the "Skid Row Slasher" killings in Southern California. The "Slasher" victims had their throats cut from ear to ear. There was evidence that the killer drank the blood of the victims. Greenwood left cups of blood and rings of salt around the corpses. The items left around the bodies have caused some to believe the murders to be linked to Satanism. This is disputed by K.V. Lanning.

On 19 January 1977, Greenwood was sentenced to life imprisonment.

Vaughn Greenwood died on December 18, 2020, in California Men's Colony, a state prison in San Luis Obispo, California, at the age of 76. His cause of death is unknown.

== Victims ==
These are the Skid Row Slasher's known victims in chronological order of attack:

Number	Name	Sex	Age	Body found
1	David Russell	M	N/A	November 13, 1964
2	Benjamin Hornberg	M	67	November 14, 1964
3	Charles Jackson	M	46	December 1, 1974
4	Moses Yakanac	M	47	December 8, 1974
5	Arthur Dahlstedt	M	54	December 11, 1974
6	David Perez	M	42	December 22, 1974
7	Casimir Strawinski	M	58	January 9, 1975
8	Robert Shannahan	M	46	January 17, 1975
9	Samuel Suarez	M	49	January 1975
10	George Frias	M	45	January 29, 1975
11	Clyde Hay	M	34	January 31, 1975
12	William Graham	M	N/A	Survived

== See also ==
- List of serial killers in the United States
- List of serial killers by number of victims
