= Seal of Los Angeles County, California =

Official emblem of Los Angeles County, California, USA

The current seal of Los Angeles County, first adopted in 2004, replaced in January 2014, and re-adopted in 2016.

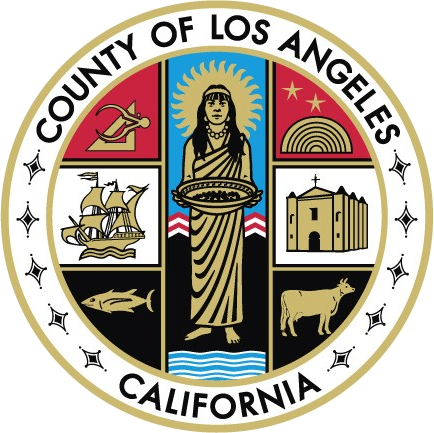
The fourth seal of Los Angeles County, used from 2014 to 2016.

The second seal of Los Angeles County, used from March 1957 to September 2004.

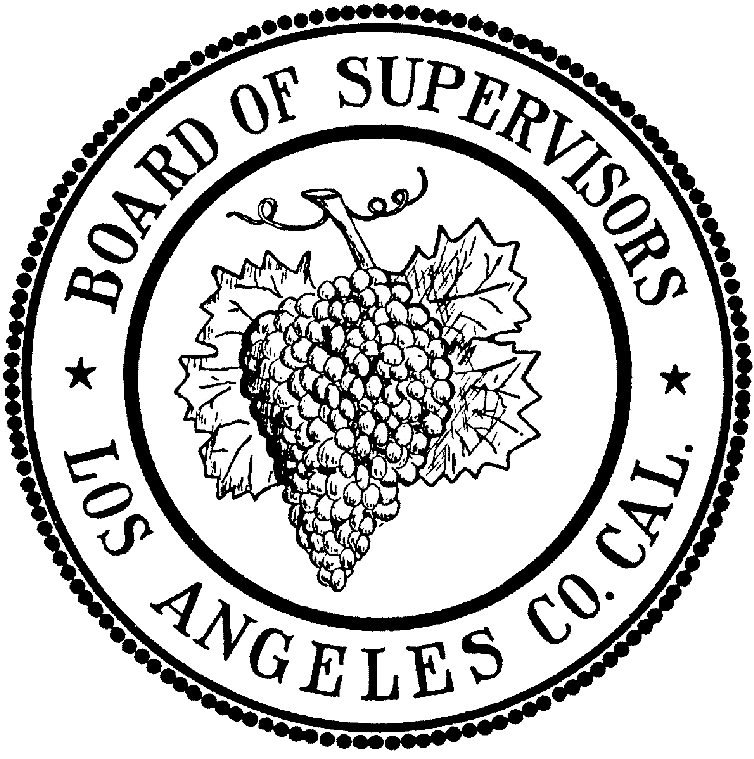
The first seal of Los Angeles County, used from 1887 to 1957.

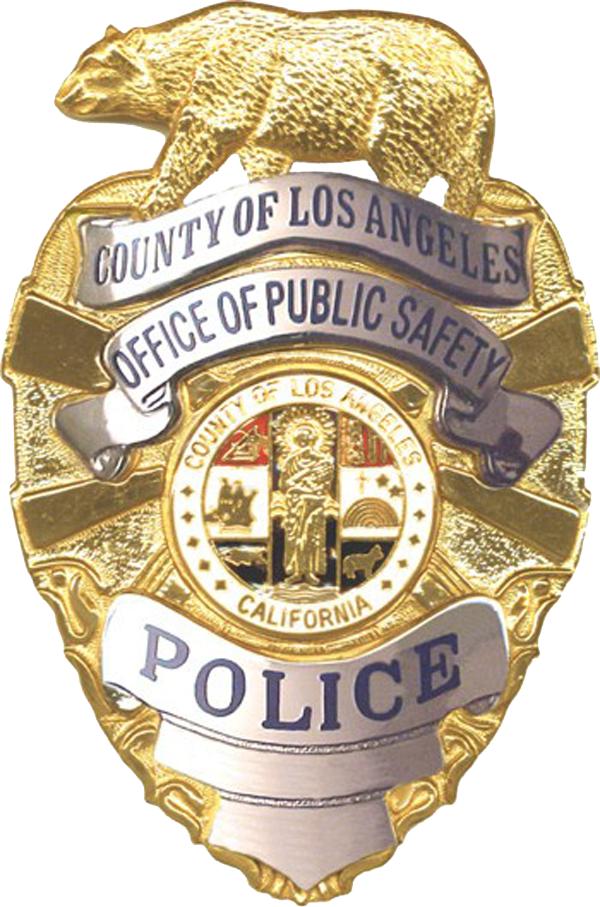
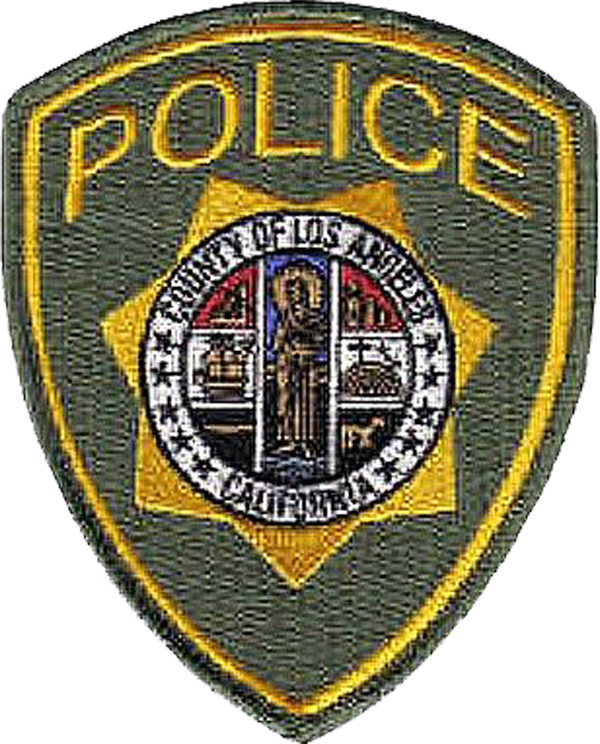
Badge and patch of the now-defunct L.A. County Police, featuring the pre-2004 seal.

The first Seal of the County of Los Angeles was established in 1887 and has been changed three times since then. It is used on official county documents, vehicular decals, on buildings, and is displayed on the bear-top shield badge worn by uniformed county officers. It is also featured prominently on the county's flag. The current seal was adopted in 2016 and is identical to a design initially adopted in 2004.

== Design ==
The current form of the seal, adopted in January 2014, portrays an image of a Tongvan woman, representing the early inhabitants of the Los Angeles Basin, surrounded by six smaller iconic images, with three on each side. The words “County of Los Angeles, California” surround the seal.

The woman stands on the shore of the Pacific Ocean with the San Gabriel Mountains and the sun in the background.

On her right, there are the engineering instruments of a triangle and a caliper (representing the industrial construction complex of the county and its vital contribution to the exploration of space), a Spanish galleon (specifically Juan Rodríguez Cabrillo's ship the San Salvador, which sailed into San Pedro Harbor on October 8, 1542), and a tuna (representing the fishing industry).

On her left, the images of The Hollywood Bowl (representing the County's cultural activities) with two stars above it (to represent the motion picture and television industries), the Mission San Gabriel Arcangel (representing the historic role of the missions in the settlement of the Los Angeles region), and the championship cow Pearlette (representing the dairy industry).

== History ==
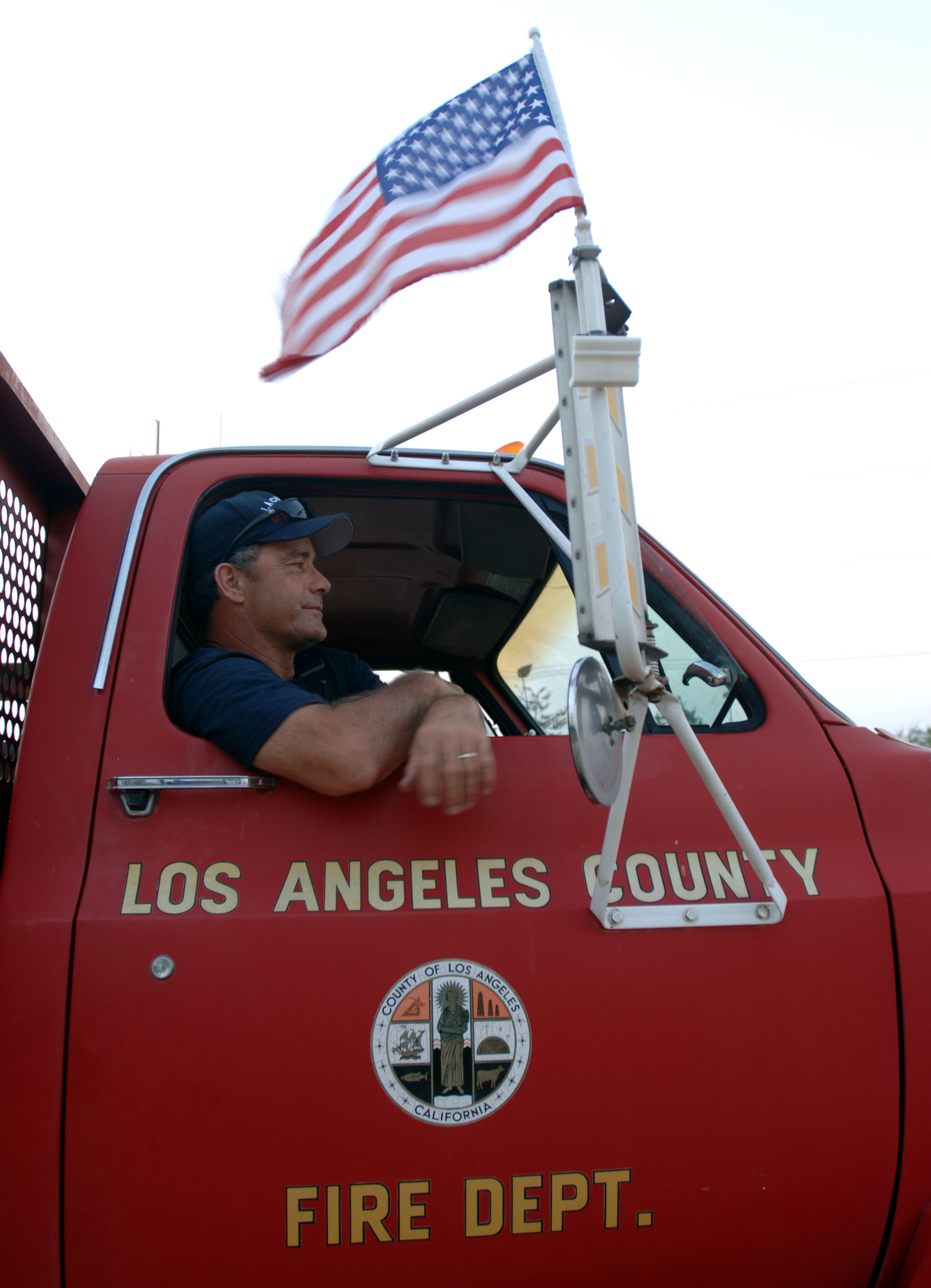
The 1957 to 2004 Los Angeles County seal affixed to the side of an L.A. County Fire Department vehicle in 2005 as it responds to a Louisianan town to assist in post-hurricane disaster recovery efforts.

=== First seal: 1887–1957 ===
The original 1887 county seal displayed grapes, surrounded by the words "Board of Supervisors – Los Angeles Co. Cal."

=== Second seal: 1957–2004 ===
Former L.A. County Supervisor Kenneth Hahn designed a new seal, which was drawn by Millard Sheets, and adopted by the Los Angeles County Board of Supervisors on January 2, 1957, effective March 1, 1957. It included an image of Pomona, the Roman goddess of fruit trees, and the symbols of a cross and oil derricks.

=== Third and fifth seal: 2004–2014, 2016–present ===
In 2004, the seal was altered. A short time later, on May 25, 2004, the ACLU alleged that the seal's cross (a reference to the Hollywood Cross) was a violation of the Establishment Clause of the Constitution. The Board's new seal had also voluntarily eliminated Pomona and the oil derricks, without references by the ACLU.

In the current seal, the stars and an image of the Hollywood Bowl (originally in the middle right column, also where the cross was originally placed) replaced the oil towers. The cross was removed, and replaced with an image of the Mission San Gabriel Arcangel.

Some official L.A. County buildings and older county vehicles still use old seals, probably due to lack of effort in removing the seals. Uniformed county officers issued badges before 2004 did not receive new badges when the seal was updated, and thus continue to wear the older design. Occasionally, when a new seal is adopted, old ones may continue to be used until they are no longer usable due to wear, as in Mississippi's case when it adopted a new state seal in 2014.

=== Fourth seal: 2014–2016 ===
On Tuesday, January 7, 2014, the Board of Supervisors voted 3-2 to put a cross back on top of the mission depicted on the County seal, stating that it more correctly reflected the history of the San Gabriel Mission. The cross on the mission was removed during renovation. The ACLU of Southern California expressed opposition, alleging the action would violate both the Californian and United States Constitution. A federal lawsuit was filed against Los Angeles County on February 6, 2014. Critics of the change, including Supervisor Sheila Kuehl, stated that the time and money spent defending the county seal was wasted when there were many other issues requiring the Board of Supervisors' attention. Kuehl proposed replacement of the seal with a graphic of a seal as an April Fools' Day joke.

In April 2016, the addition of the cross to the seal was ruled unconstitutional by U.S. District Court Judge Christina A. Snyder. The county accepted the ruling. As part of the court order, the 2014 seal was covered up at County sites and replaced with the 2004 seal, and badges, uniforms, and materials printed with the 2014 seal were removed and replaced with those depicting the 2004 seal.

== See also ==
- Flag of the City of Los Angeles
- List of U.S. county and city insignia
