= Clara Shortridge Foltz Criminal Justice Center =

Courthouse In Los Angeles, California

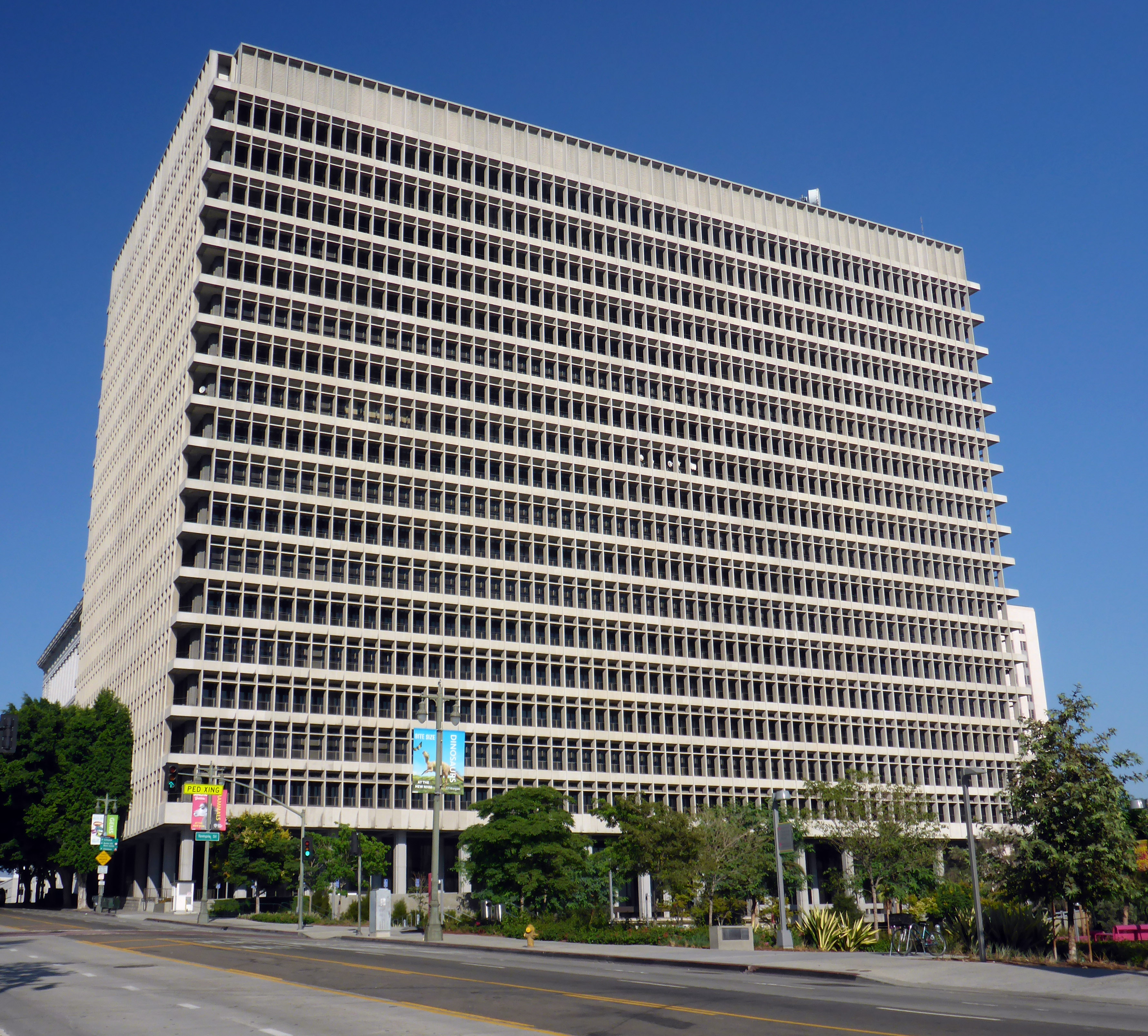
- The Criminal Justice Center was dedicated as the Criminal Courts Building in 1972.
- Interactive map of the Clara Shortridge Foltz Criminal Justice Center area

General information
- Location: 210 West Temple Street; Los Angeles, California, United States
- Coordinates: 34.054986°N 118.24346°W
- Construction started: 1970
- Completed: 1972
- Opening: October 26, 1972
- Cost: $33.7 million

Technical details
- Floor count: 20
- Floor area: 850,000 square feet (79,000 m^{2})
- Lifts/elevators: 12

Design and construction
- Architect: Adrian Wilson Associates
- Structural engineer: Adrian Wilson

The Clara Shortridge Foltz Criminal Justice Center (formerly known as the Criminal Courts Building) is the county criminal courthouse in the Civic Center neighborhood of Los Angeles, California, United States. It is located at 210 West Temple Street, between Broadway and Spring Street occupying the former site of the historic Red Sandstone Courthouse from 1891–1936, and prior to that, Los Angeles High School (1873–82), on the former Pound Cake Hill, now flattened.

Originally known as the Criminal Courts Building, in 2002 it was renamed the Clara Shortridge Foltz Criminal Justice Center, after Clara S. Foltz, the first female lawyer on the West Coast of the United States (and also the first person to propose the creation of a public defender's office).

The building houses the main offices of the Los Angeles County Public Defender.

== Notable trials ==
- Richard Ramirez murder trial
- David Carpenter murder trial
- O. J. Simpson murder trial
- Phil Spector murder trial
- Courtney Love for her assault trial
- Chris Brown for his assault trial
- Helen Golay and Olga Rutterschmidt – 2008 murder trial
- Suge Knight for his trial for a hit and run in 2015
- CeeLo Green for his sexual assault and furnishing ecstasy trial in 2013
- Michael Jace for his murder trial
- Conrad Hilton Jr. for his vehicle theft and violating a restraining order trial
- Lonnie Franklin Jr. aka The Grim Sleeper serial killer trial
- Roman Polanski hearing in related to his sexual abuse scandal
- BART Police shooting of Oscar Grant murder trial
- Trial of Dr. Conrad Murray for the death of Michael Jackson
- Harvey Weinstein for his sexual assault trials
- Trial of Ron Jeremy for sexual assault.
- Danny Masterson for his rape trials
- Naasón Joaquín García for his sexual assault trial
- José Manuel García Guevara for his vehicular assault trials
- Eric Ronald Holder Jr for his role in the murder of Nipsey Hussle
- Trial of Tory Lanez for shooting at Megan Thee Stallion.
- Trial of ASAP Rocky for assault with a deadly weapon.
- Trial of Eric Weinberg for sexual assault.
- Isauro Aguirre and Pearl Fernandez for the murder of Gabriel Fernandez

== Security measures ==
High-profile trials are held on the ninth floor of the building, with a secondary screening area in addition to the main screening at the ground floor level. The eighth and tenth floors are inaccessible from the public elevators and stairwells.
