= Tiffiny Blacknell =

American criminal prosecutor

- Born: Tiffiny Nicole Townend; November 14, 1976 (age 49); Inglewood, California, U.S.
- Education: Inglewood High School; California State University, Dominguez Hills (B.A.); University of Southern California Law School (J.D.)
- Occupation: Attorney
- Partner: Jovan Blacknell

Tiffiny Townend Blacknell is an American lawyer, community activist, and an advocate for criminal justice reform. She currently works as a solo practitioner .

== Legal career ==
Blacknell currently works in private practice. She previously worked for former Los Angeles County District Attorney George Gascón. As a public defender, she was assigned to represent a man accused of kidnapping Daisy McCrackin.

=== Wiretap scandal ===
In July 2018, Blacknell uncovered a secret recording operation inside of an attorney-client interview room. It was later revealed that the operation had been set up by the Los Angeles Police Department in cooperation with a prosecutor from the Los Angeles County District Attorney's Office. In response to the scandal, the Los Angeles County Board of Supervisors voted to send a letter to then sheriff Jim McDonnell to stop the installation of audio-video recording devices inside of lock-up facilities at various criminal courthouses throughout Los Angeles County. The Los Angeles Times responded to the scandal.

== Community activism ==
=== Bail reform ===
Blacknell has engaged in activism in the Los Angeles community, such as on behalf of the National Black Mama's Bail Out Day campaign. This was a part of the National Bail Out collective, a community-based movement striving to end pretrial detention and mass incarceration. Blacknell believes that the money bail system is unjust and in need of reform. At Community Coalition's People Power Convention, Blacknell said “Ninety-five percent of arrestees plead guilty,” and noted that “studies show that sexual assault and violence happen in the first seven days of an inmate’s incarceration.”

=== Girls empowerment ===
Blacknell was the keynote speaker at the “I Matter: Girls Empowerment Conference” at East Los Angeles College, aiming to create more female leaders in the community. In her speech, Blacknell discussed her journey to become an attorney. She spoke of being a child of the Crack epidemic surrounded by drugs and gangs and having to overcome feelings of self-doubt.
