= Murder of Gabriel Fernandez =

2013 murder of an abused American boy in Palmdale, California

Palmdale child murder
- Victim Gabriel Fernandez
- Location: Palmdale, California, U.S.
- Date: May 22, 2013 (fatal beating); May 24, 2013 (death)
- Attack type: Child murder, child abuse
- Victims: Gabriel Daniel Fernandez, aged 8
- Perpetrators: Pearl Fernandez and Isauro Aguirre
- Motive: Inconclusive
- Charges: Kevin Bom, Patricia Clement, Gregory Merritt, Stefanie Rodriguez: Child abuse, falsifying public records (dismissed)
- Verdict: Fernandez: Pleaded guilty Aguirre: Guilty at trial
- Convictions: First-degree murder with special circumstances of torture
- Sentence: Fernandez: Life imprisonment without the possibility of parole Aguirre: Death (de jure)

Gabriel Daniel Fernandez (February 20, 2005 – May 24, 2013) was an eight-year-old boy from Palmdale, California, United States, who died after months of severe abuse and torture. His death resulted from a beating inflicted by his mother, Pearl Fernandez, and her boyfriend, Isauro Aguirre. Both were charged and convicted of first-degree murder with special circumstances of torture. Pearl was sentenced to life imprisonment without the possibility of parole and Aguirre was sentenced to death. Four social workers involved in the case were charged with child neglect and falsifying public records, but these charges were later dropped.

== Victim ==
Gabriel Fernandez was born on February 20, 2005, to Pearl Fernandez and Arnold Contreras. For the first four years of his life, Fernandez lived with his great-uncle, Michael Lemos Carranza, and Carranza's husband, David Martinez. According to Martinez, he and Carranza were forced to relinquish custody to Fernandez's grandparents, Robert and Sandra Fernandez, due to the grandfather's objections to Fernandez being raised by a gay couple. Fernandez lived with his grandparents until September 2012, when his mother and her boyfriend, Isauro Aguirre, took him into their custody. Other family members expressed concern at this due to Pearl's alleged neglect of her other children.

== Abuse and murder ==
Throughout his stay in the home of Pearl Fernandez and Isauro Aguirre, Gabriel Fernandez was systematically abused and tortured. According to Gabriel's older brother, Ezequiel, this included beatings, confinement in a locked cabinet, shots from a BB gun, and the forced consumption of cat litter, cat feces, spoiled food, and his own vomit. Ezequiel also reported that the couple often laughed while inflicting the abuse. Prosecutors said that one of Aguirre's motivations for abusing Fernandez was his belief that the boy was gay.

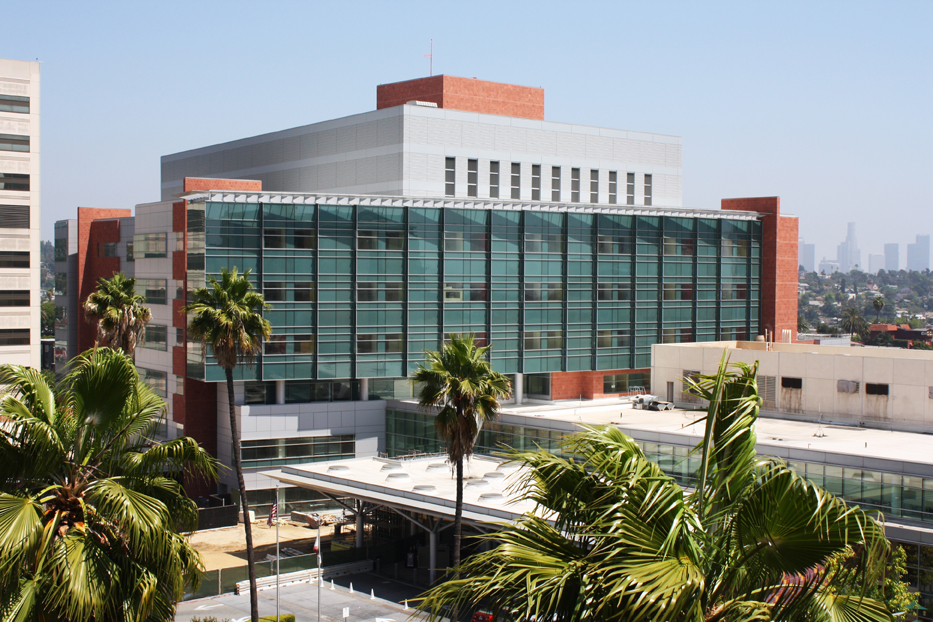
Children's Hospital Los Angeles, where Gabriel Fernandez died

Jennifer Garcia, Fernandez's first-grade teacher at Summerwind Elementary School, made the initial report to the child welfare hotline after Fernandez asked her questions about being whipped. Despite a social worker being assigned to Fernandez's case, Garcia continued to witness escalating injuries on Fernandez. She continued to call the hotline and was told each time that a social worker would investigate. However, no medical assessments were ever conducted, and social workers visiting the home spoke only with Fernandez's mother, never interviewing Fernandez himself.

On May 22, 2013, Fernandez was rendered unresponsive after a beating reportedly inflicted for not tidying his toys. Pearl called 911, and paramedics discovered Fernandez naked with severe injuries, including a cracked skull, broken ribs, and BB pellets lodged in his body. Fernandez was transported to Antelope Valley Hospital, where he was declared brain dead; he died two days later at Children's Hospital Los Angeles. An autopsy concluded that Fernandez's death was a direct result of blunt force trauma, aggravated by neglect and malnutrition.

== Perpetrators ==
=== Pearl Fernandez ===
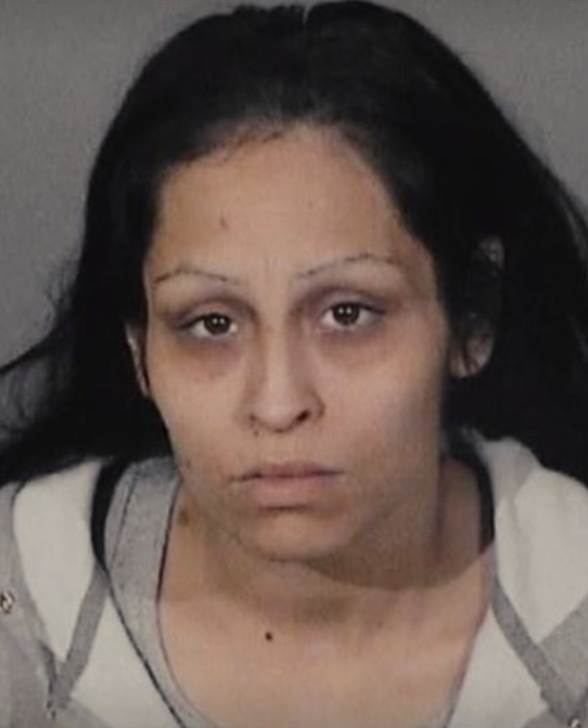
Mug shot of Pearl Fernandez

Pearl Sinthia Fernandez was born on August 29, 1983, to Robert and Sandra Fernandez. During her childhood, her father was frequently incarcerated, and Fernandez alleges her mother was abusive and neglectful. At the age of nine, Fernandez began using methamphetamine and drinking alcohol, and at eleven, she decided to run away from home. Her education ended when she dropped out of school in the eighth grade. As a teenager, Fernandez reported experiencing further trauma, including an alleged attempted rape by her uncle and being held hostage and repeatedly raped by a group of men, leading to suicidal ideation.

Fernandez had four children with Arnold Contreras, including Gabriel. She left Gabriel at the hospital three days after his birth, but regained custody of him in 2012. While Fernandez claims that many of her romantic partners (including Aguirre) were abusive, her aunt, Elizabeth Carranza, and Carranza's partner, dispute this, alleging that Fernandez herself was abusive and controlling towards her partners. Additionally, Fernandez had pending charges against her for threatening to stab Contreras. Following Gabriel's death, Pearl reported abusing the opioid drugs oxycodone and Norco.

Fernandez has been diagnosed with several mental health issues including a depressive disorder, developmental disability, a possible personality disorder, and post-traumatic stress disorder. A cognitive ability test in 2011 revealed verbal comprehension skills at the level of a typical second-grade student. Clinical psychologist Deborah S. Miora, expert witness for the defense at the trial, stated that Fernandez was "virtually unable to use thoughts to guide her behavior and control her emotional reactions".

Fernandez is currently serving a life sentence without the possibility of parole at Central California Women's Facility. She was admitted to the facility on June 21, 2018. In April 2021, she filed a petition seeking re-sentencing, but it was denied by Los Angeles Superior Court Judge George G. Lomeli, who concluded she was "not entitled to re-sentencing relief". Fernandez filed a second appeal in 2026, which Lomeli also denied.

=== Isauro Aguirre ===
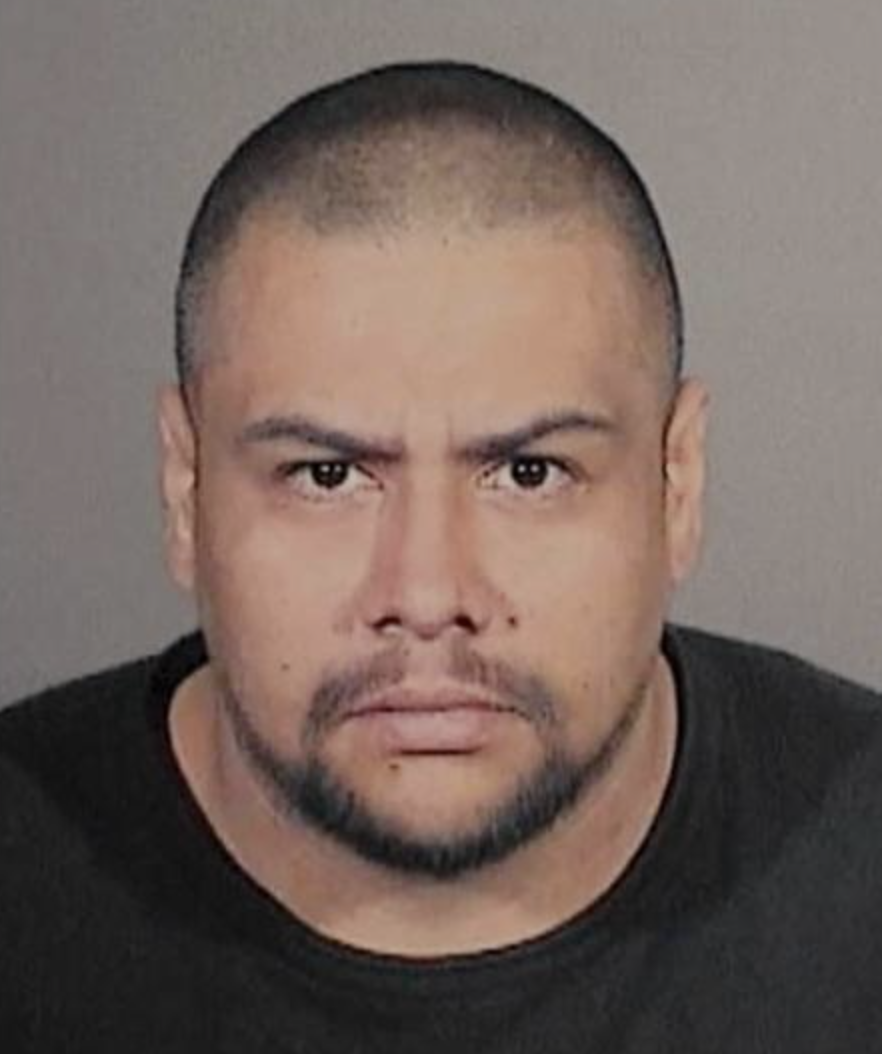
Mug shot of Isauro Aguirre

Isauro "Tony" Aguirre was born on June 13, 1980. Aguirre was intellectually slow, repeating two grades in school and ultimately dropping out. During his 20s, he worked as a caregiver and driver at Woodland Park Retirement Hotel in Woodland Hills. The executive director of the retirement home described Aguirre in court as a kind and gentle person, noting that he would frequently change diapers for elderly residents. Aguirre met Pearl Fernandez approximately 18–24 months before they took custody of Gabriel Fernandez. In October 2012, Aguirre began working as a security guard for AVL Private Security at the Vallarta Market in Palmdale, California.

Aguirre was charged with first-degree murder with special circumstances of torture for murdering Gabriel Fernandez. He was convicted by a jury and subsequently sentenced to death, a decision affirmed by Lomeli. He was admitted to San Quentin State Prison on June 13, 2018, to await execution. However, due to the moratorium on capital punishment in California, his execution date remains undetermined. In 2021, Aguirre was transferred to Richard J. Donovan Correctional Facility in San Diego. On November 5, 2026, Gavin Newsom, the governor of California announce to commute the death sentence of 538 inmates (including Aguirre) to life without parole, but because Aguirre committed multiple prior felonies, the commutation must be approved by the Supreme Court.

== Legal proceedings ==
=== Perpetrators ===
On May 23, 2013, Pearl Fernandez and Isauro Aguirre were arrested. Fernandez was arrested for felony child endangerment while Aguirre was arrested for attempted murder. After Gabriel's death, Fernandez and Aguirre were both charged with first degree murder with special circumstances of torture; prosecutors pursued the death penalty.

Isauro Aguirre pleaded not guilty to the charge of first-degree murder with special circumstances of torture, and the case was prosecuted by Deputy District Attorney Jonathan Hatami and Deputy District Attorney Scott Yang.

In September 2017, jury selection began for the case. Questionnaires were given to prospective jurors, and they were informed that the trial could last as long as six weeks. Additionally, they were told the trial involved "extensive internal and external injuries" of the victim. The jury composition was seven women and five men.

When the trial began, jurors were given details about the extensive abuse Gabriel Fernandez went through in the months preceding his fatal beating. Prosecutor Jon Hatami called Aguirre "pure evil" and argued that he deserved the death penalty even though it "doesn't even compare to what he did to Gabriel."

Defense attorney John Alan argued that Aguirre was considered to be "kind" and "compassionate" during his employment at the retirement facility and that he had never committed a crime before meeting Pearl Fernandez.

Jury deliberation began on November 14, 2017, and a verdict was reached the next afternoon. Ultimately, the jury found him guilty of first-degree murder and guilty of the circumstances of torture charges. On December 11, 2017, jury deliberation began for the sentencing phase. The next day the jury was deadlocked; however, on December 13, they rendered a verdict of death, which was accepted by Lomeli.

Pearl Fernandez pled guilty on February 15, 2018, to her charge as part of a plea deal to avoid the death penalty, and was sentenced to life imprisonment without the possibility of parole. In court, she stated, "I want to say I'm sorry for what happened. I wish Gabriel was alive. Every day I wish that I would have made better choices. I'm sorry to my children, and I want them to know that I love them."

=== Social workers ===
Social workers Stefanie Rodriguez and Patricia Clement, along with their supervisors Kevin Bom and Gregory Merritt, were accused of neglecting Fernandez and falsifying public records. According to legal scholar Charlotte Hinkamp, there was sufficient evidence of child abuse and it was surprising that the Department of Children and Family Services did not remove Fernandez from the home.

The child abuse charges against the social workers were dropped in January 2020, as justices in the 2nd District Court of Appeal ruled that failure to remove Fernandez from his abusers did not constitute criminal liability for child abuse. Nine sheriff's deputies were internally disciplined for not properly investigating the abuse allegations.

== Subsequent events ==
In September 2026, California Governor Gavin Newsom signed "Gabriel’s Law" (Assembly Bill 2304), a new legislation inspired by Fernandez's case. The law requires social workers to secure immediate emergency care for endangered children, and establishes that social workers who falsify or manipulate case records can face criminal prosecution.

== Media portrayal ==
The Trials of Gabriel Fernandez is a six-part crime documentary that premiered on Netflix in 2020. Directed by Brian Knappenberger, the documentary details the murder and subsequent responses by the media and local government.

== See also ==
- List of death row inmates in the United States § California
- Murder of Zachary Turner
- Murder of Sylvia Likens
- Murder of Anthony Avalos
- Killing of Rebekah Baptiste
