= John Noguez =

American politician

John R. Noguez

Los Angeles County Assessor
- In office 6 December 2010 – 2014
- Preceded by: Robert Quon
- Succeeded by: Jeffrey Prang
- Majority: 999,393 (59.59%)

Mayor of Huntington Park
- In office March 2004 – March 2007

Member of the Huntington Park City Council
- In office March 2003 – 6 December 2010

Personal details
- Born: Juan Renaldo Rodriguez; November 29, 1964 (age 61) Hollywood, California, U.S.
- Spouse: Lilliana Guerrero (m. 2001)
- Education: Roosevelt High School; CSU Los Angeles
- Other names: John Noguez; Juan R. Noguez; Juan Renaldo Rodriguez Noguez; Juan Reynaldo Rodriguez

John Noguez (born Juan Renaldo Rodriguez on November 29, 1964) is a Mexican American politician and a former Los Angeles County Assessor, currently under indictment on corruption charges relating to his term.

== Early life and education ==
Noguez was born on November 29, 1964, at the Kaiser Permanente hospital in Hollywood, California, to Jesus Rodriguez and Carmen Anaya, immigrants from Mexico. His father Jesus is from Puerto Vallarta, Jalisco while his mother is from Michoacán.

Although his birth name is Juan Renaldo Rodriguez, he uses a number of aliases including Juan R. Noguez, John R. Noguez, and Juan Reynaldo Rodriguez Noguez. The surname Noguez reportedly comes from his mother, whose full name is Maria Carmen Anaya-Noguez. In traditional Spanish naming customs, the maternal surname follows the paternal surname, often hyphenated in Anglophone countries.

For the first 6 years of his life, Noguez was raised in Michoacan, Mexico. Noguez spent the rest of his formative years in Boyle Heights and attended Roosevelt High School. He went on to study at the California State University, Los Angeles' School of Finance, concentrating on real estate studies. However, Noguez dropped out of the university, 3 classes shy of a bachelor's degree. He holds an Advanced Appraiser Certificate from the California State Board of Equalization.

== Career ==
In 1985, he joined the Los Angeles County Assessor’s Office as a student worker, eventually becoming an Appraiser Specialist for major properties.

Noguez has held non-partisan leadership roles in government, including President of the League of California Cities' Los Angeles Division, as well as Secretary Treasurer of the California Contract Cities Association.

Since 2000, Noguez has served in the City of Huntington Park government, as mayor, member of the City Council and as City Clerk. Noguez was elected to the Huntington Park City Council in March 2003 and re-elected in 2007 and was the mayor in 2004 and 2006.

In the November 2010 general election, Noguez was elected as the Los Angeles County Assessor, winning a majority of 999,393 (59.59% of votes) and defeating John Y. Wong. During the campaign, Noguez secured the endorsements of 4 of the 5 incumbent LA County Supervisors and former Assessor Rick Auerbach and raised $1,000,000 in campaign donations. During the election, the Los Angeles Times had officially endorsed Noguez's rival, John Wong, considering him to be apolitical, as compared to Noguez.

Noguez took a leave of absence from June 2012 to December 2014 due to conspiracy and corruption charges. He was replaced as County Assessor on December 1, 2014.

== Corruption scandal ==
On January 4, 2011, Owen Harris, a Supervising Appraiser, at the LA County Assessor's office, spotted discrepancies in property assessments of affluent homes setting off a Los Angeles County District Attorney-led investigation into possible corruption within the office. The Los Angeles District Attorney's office searched a dozen locations, including the homes of Noguez and associates, following allegations that Noguez had peddled his influence to secure tax reductions for his campaign contributor's clients. In May 2012, an employee was arrested on 60 felony counts for lowering the property tax rates by $172 million for homeowners in Beverly Hills, Brentwood and Pacific Palisades in exchange for contributions to Noguez's campaign.

Noguez began an indefinite paid leave of absence in June 2012 amid ongoing investigations. On June 12, 2012, Santos Kreimann, a civil servant of 20 years, was selected to fill in the vacant role as County Assessor.

On October 17, 2012, Noguez was arrested on 44 counts of conspiracy, bribery and corruption, with bail set at $1.36 million. Also arrested were Mark McNeil, one of Noguez's chief appraisers and Ramin Salari, a campaign contributor and Arizona tax consultant. Between February and September 2010, Noguez allegedly accepted $185,000 from Salari and used his influence to lower the appraised property values for Salari's clients, to help the clients save an approximate total of $1.16 million in property taxes. Improper tax breaks were granted to more than 100 Westside property owners.

Despite calls for his resignation by LA County officials, Noguez continued to receive an annual salary because he had not been convicted.

Following an election in November 2014, Noquez was replaced as County Assessor by Jeffrey Prang. As of July 2020, Noguez had not been tried and remained free on bail. Charges were initially thrown out in May 2020 via technicality but the Los Angeles County District Attorney's office refiled the same charges two months later.

== Personal life ==
Noguez is openly gay, but has been legally married to Lilliana Guerrero, a woman, since 2001.
