= Los Angeles County Treasurer and Tax Collector =

Los Angeles County Treasurer and Tax Collector bills, collects, invests, borrows, safeguards and disburses monies and properties in Los Angeles County. The Los Angeles County Board of Supervisors appoints the treasurer to this position.

The previous treasurer was Keith Knox. The current treasurer is Elizabeth Ginsberg.
