= Los Angeles County Counsel =

The Office of the Los Angeles County Counsel is a public law office that serves as legal counsel to the Los Angeles County Board of Supervisors and other County agencies.

== History ==
The Office of the Los Angeles County Counsel was established in 1913 pursuant to the Los Angeles County Charter and the California Constitution.

== County Counsel ==
The Office of the County Counsel is headed by the Los Angeles County Counsel, an appointed County officer whose duties include providing legal advice and representation to the Los Angeles County Board of Supervisors, County officers, County departments, and various other public agencies in civil matters.

County Counsel	Term		
A.J. Hill	1913–1923		
Edward T. Bishop	1923–1926		
Everett W. Mattoon	1926–1938		
J.H. O'Connor	1938–1945		
Harold W. Kennedy	1945–1967		
John D. Maharg	1967–1973		
John H. Larson	1973–1983		
DeWitt W. Clinton	1983–1998		
Lloyd W. Pellman	1998–2004		
Raymond G. Fortner Jr.	2004–2009		
Robert Kalunian (acting)	2009–2010		
Andrea Ordin	2010–2012		
John F. Krattli	2012–2014		
Mark J. Saladino	2014–2015		
Mary C. Wickham	2015–2020		
Rodrigo A. Castro-Silva	November 2020 – Present	Dawyn Harrison	Present
