= Winnebago Tribe of Nebraska =

Native American tribe

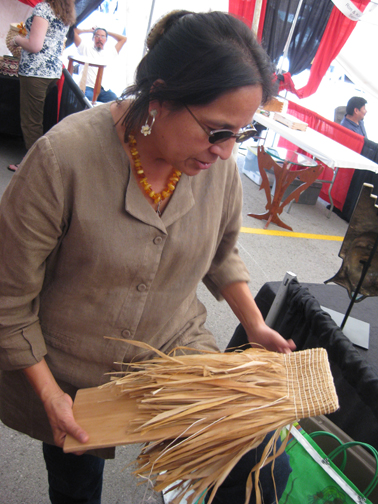
- Enrolled tribal member Martha Gradolf, a weaver

Total population
- 4,192

Regions with significant populations
- United States (Nebraska & Iowa)

Languages
- English, Ho-Chunk

Religion
- traditional tribal religion, Native American Church

Related ethnic groups
- other Ho-Chunk people, Otoe, Iowa, and Missouria people

The Winnebago Tribe of Nebraska (Ho-Chunk: Nįįšoc Hoocąk) is one of two federally recognized tribes of Ho-Chunk, along with the Ho-Chunk Nation of Wisconsin. Tribe members often identify as Hoocągra, meaning "People of the Parent Speech" in their own language.

== Reservation ==
By the treaty of 1846 with the United States, the Ho-Chunk Nation was assigned to a vast wilderness area in central Minnesota Territory, the Long Prairie Reservation. Shortly after acquiring the Long Prairie Reservation, The Ho-Chunk Nation signed the 1855 Winnebago Treaty with the US government dissolving this reservation and creating a reservation three miles east of Mankato MN called the Blue Earth Reservation.

In 1863, the Ho-Chunk were forced to move from the Blue Earth Reservation to Crow Creek and then to the Winnebago Reservation, established by treaty on 8 March 1865. It is further west, in Thurston and Dixon counties, Nebraska, and Woodbury County, Iowa.

The reservation is 176.55 square miles (112,990 acres; 457.3 km^{2}), of which 27,637 acres (43.183 sq mi; 111.84 km^{2}) is tribal trust land. In 1990, some 1,151 tribal members lived on the reservation.

== Government ==
The Winnebago Tribe of Nebraska (Ho-Chunk Nation) is headquartered in Winnebago, Nebraska. The tribe is governed by a democratically elected general council.

The current administration is as follows:

- Chairman: Coly Brown
- Vice-chairman: Isaac Smith
- Treasurer: Rona Stealer
- Secretary: Teresa Littlegeorge
- Council Member: Eugene DeCora Sr.
- Council Member: Trey blackhawk
- Council Member: Lorelei Decora
- Council Member: Ireta Frazier

The Winnebago Tribe runs multiple programs to provide services to the tribe and local community, including multiple educational programs aimed at assisting low-income tribe members, a tribal housing program, and the Winnebago Veteran's Association. Additionally, the Winnebago Tribe runs the Winnebago Fire Crew, which serves the Winnebago and other local tribes.

== Language ==
The Winnebago Tribe speaks English and Ho-Chunk (Hocąk), one of the Western Siouan languages; it is part of the Siouan-Catawban language family.

== Economic development ==
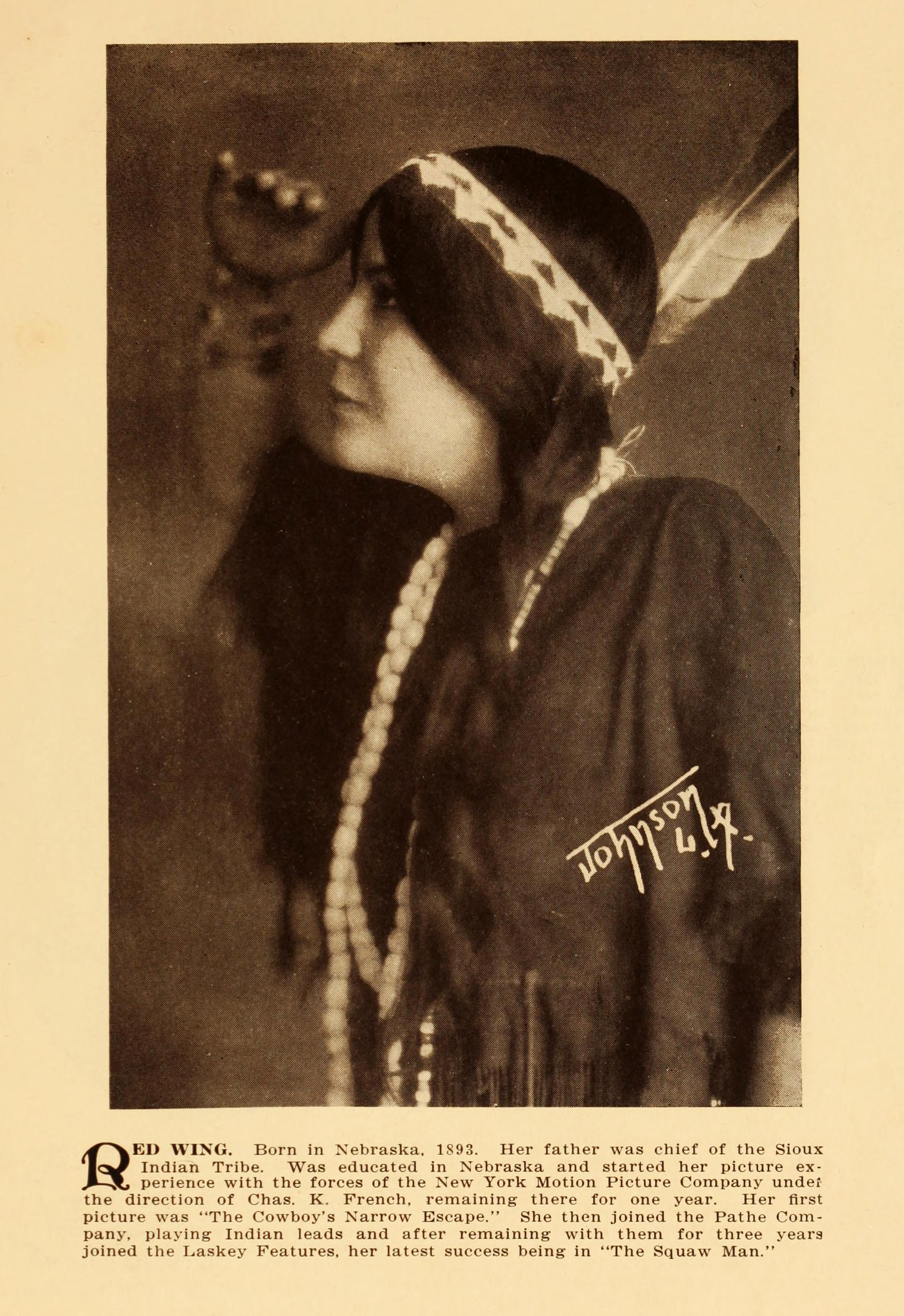
Lillian St. Cyr, known by her stage name of Red Wing (1884–1974), is a Winnebago actress of the silent film era

Ho-Chunk, Inc. is the tribe's corporation; it provides construction services, professional services, and business and consumer products. The Winnebago Tribe also owns and operates the WinnaVegas Casino Resort, hotel, and Flowers Island Restaurant and Buffet, all located in Sloan, Iowa.

Ho-Chunk, Inc. has been recognized several times for exercising good governance and creatively solving issues faced in the tribe. The Harvard Project on American Indian Economic Development, administered at the Harvard Kennedy School, has recognized the tribe's corporation with an Honoring Nations award in 2000, 2002, 2006, and 2015.

== Juvenile Services ==
The tribe worked with the Nebraska Crime Commission to create a comprehensive plan for responding to juvenile safety and crime prevention issues. The most recent revision of the "Winnebago Tribe of Nebraska Comprehensive Juvenile Services Plan" lists three primary areas of need:

1. Responsibility and awareness for youth distributed across the whole community.
2. A higher level of community organization.
3. A better coordinated and more comprehensive juvenile justice system.

In 2012, the Winnebago Juvenile Justice Planning Team (WJJPT) was formed to assist with youth outreach and public safety. The WJJPT has planned and carried out a variety of public safety initiatives such as school outreach programs and planning a Crisis Intervention Center.

== Notable tribal members ==
- Joba Chamberlain (b. 1985), Major League Baseball pitcher from 2007 to 2016
- Henry Roe Cloud (1884–1950), educator, college administrator, US federal government official, Presbyterian minister; first full-blood Native American to attend Yale College
- Angel De Cora (1871–1919), artist, educator, and Indian rights activist
- Terri Crawford Hansen (b. 1953), journalist
- Frank LaMere (1950–2019), activist, advocate, politician
  - Lexie Wakan LaMere (16 May 1992 – 3 January 2014), first native to graduate from Senate Page school; youngest delegate in the Nebraska Democratic Party
- Renya K. Ramirez (b. 1959), anthropologist, author, and Native feminist
- John Raymond Rice (1914–1950), U.S. Army, in service of UN Forces in Korean War
- Reuben Snake (1937–1993), chairman of the American Indian Movement and the tribe, and later president of the National Congress of American Indians
- Lillian St. Cyr, known as Red Wing (1884–1974), an actress of the silent film era

== See also ==
- Ho-Chunk religion
- Little Priest Tribal College
