= Little Priest Tribal College =

Community college in the United States

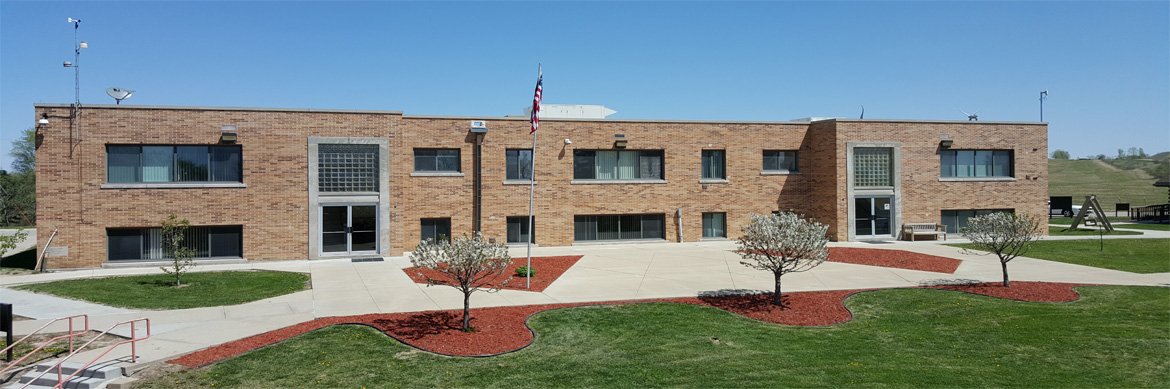
- Little Priest Tribal College
- Type: Public tribal land-grant community college
- Established: 1996
- Affiliations: Winnebago Tribe of Nebraska
- Academic affiliations: American Indian Higher Education Consortium
- President: Manoj Patil
- Location: Winnebago, Nebraska, United States
- Campus: Rural
- Nickname: Warriors
- Website: www.littlepriest.edu

Little Priest Tribal College is a public tribal land-grant community college in Winnebago, Nebraska. It is a member of the American Indian Higher Education Consortium and primarily supported by the Winnebago Tribe of Nebraska. It has an enrollment of 135 students, of which 90 percent are American Indian.

== History ==
The Winnebago Tribal Council, anticipating significant academic growth in Winnebago students, appointed a task to research and evaluate the higher education component of its total education plan. Part of this research was the studying of the general education and major programs at the then existing institution of higher education, Nebraska Indian Community College (NICC). The task force determined that the programs of NICC would not meet the needs of future Winnebago students. After exploring several options, the Winnebago Tribal College decided to withdraw from NICC and charter its own college as the educational arm of the tribe: Little Priest Tribal College. The college was named after Little Priest, the last true war chief of the Ho-Chunk people. It began offering academic courses and community education classes in August 1996. In 1994, the college was designated a land-grant college alongside 31 other tribal colleges.

== Academics ==
Little Priest Tribal College offers Associate of Arts and Associate of Science degrees as well as a community education program that provides workshops and Continuing Education Units. The college is also a member of the Nebraska Transfer Initiative that facilitates students transferring to other colleges and universities in Nebraska.

LPTC has several articulation agreements with surrounding four-year institutions, including some focuses on specific academic programs. For example, Wayne State College has an agreement to accept LPTC courses within the Business program and Briar Cliff University in Iowa has an agreement for LPTC students to seamlessly transfer into their Social Work program.

Little Priest Tribal College has been approved by the Bureau of Indian Affairs (BIA) and has been accepted for full membership in the American Indian Higher Education Consortium (AIHEC). The college is accredited by the Higher Learning Commission.

== Athletics ==
Little Priest Tribal College (LPTC) offers Men's and Women's Basketball. It is associated with the National Junior College Athletic Association (NJCAA) at the Division II level and is a member of the Iowa Community College Athletic Conference (ICCAC) in all sports. LPTC became full members of the ICCAC in July 2018. In March of 2021 the college ended the athletics due to COVID-19.
