= Winnebago Reservation =

- Indian reservation
- Location of the Winnebago Reservation in Nebraska

- Location in the United States
- Coordinates: 42°13′28″N 96°35′49″W
- Tribe: Winnebago
- Country: United States
- State: Nebraska and Iowa
- County: Thurston County, Nebraska, Dixon County, Nebraska and Woodbury County, Iowa
- Headquarters: Winnebago, Nebraska

Area
  - Total: 177.66 sq mi (460.1 km^{2})
  - Land: 176.55 sq mi (457.3 km^{2})
  - Water: 1.11 sq mi (2.9 km^{2})

Population (2020)
  - Total: 2,737
  - Density: 15.5/sq mi (6.0/km^{2})
- Website: Winnebago Tribe of Nebraska

The Winnebago Reservation of the Winnebago Tribe of Nebraska is located in Thurston County, Nebraska, United States. The tribal council offices are located in the town of Winnebago. The villages of Emerson, south of First Street, as well as Thurston, are also located on the reservation. The reservation occupies northern Thurston County, Nebraska, as well as southeastern Dixon County and Woodbury County, Iowa, and a small plot of off-reservation land of southern Craig Township in Burt County, Nebraska. The other federally recognized Winnebago tribe is the Ho-Chunk Nation of Wisconsin.

== Early history ==
The Winnebago Reservation is on land that originally belonged to the Omaha Nation. On February 21, 1863, Congress passed legislation removing the Winnebago, who call themselves the Ho-Chunk, from the Blue Earth Reservation in Minnesota to Crow Creek, South Dakota. This location lacked essential resources, leading to a famine that sent many Winnebago people to seek refuge on the Omaha Reservation further down the Missouri River. In order to establish a separate Winnebago Reservation, the Omaha Nation ceded the northern portion of their own reservation to the United States on March 6, 1865, and the United States granted this area to the Winnebago Tribe in exchange for their South Dakota lands in a treaty on March 8, 1865. The Omaha Nation later conveyed an additional 12,348 acres (49.97 km^{2}) of timber land to the Winnebago Reservation through an act of Congress on June 22, 1874 and a deed dated July 31, 1874.

Federal legislation including the Dawes Act of 1887 led to the allotment of Winnebago tribal lands into private ownership. By 1910, the Bureau of Indian Affairs reported that 106,040.82 acres (429.1320 km^{2}) were allotted to 1,200 Indians; 480 acres (1.9 km^{2}) reserved for agency, etc.; the residue, 1,710.80 acres (6.9234 km^{2}), is unallotted.

== Geography ==
According to the United States Census Bureau, the reservation has a total area of 177.66 square miles (460.1 km^{2}), of which 176.55 square miles (457.3 km^{2}) is land and 1.11 square miles (2.9 km^{2}) is water. The Winnebago Tribe of Nebraska held an additional 0.179 square miles (115 acres; 0.46 km^{2}) of off-reservation trust land as of 2020.

Due to allotment under the Dawes Act of 1887, much of the reservation is no-longer tribally-owned. According to the Bureau of Indian Affairs, the tribe's total trust land was 27,637 acres (43.183 sq mi; 111.84 km^{2}), or about 24.5% of the reservation land area.

== Demographics ==
As of the census of 2020, the population living within the reservation boundaries was 2,737. The population density was 15.5 inhabitants per square mile (6.0/km^{2}). There were 921 housing units at an average density of 5.2 per square mile (2.0/km^{2}). The racial makeup of the reservation and off-reservation trust land was 67.1% Native American, 26.9% White, 0.7% Black or African American, 0.2% Pacific Islander, 0.2% Asian, 0.8% from other races, and 4.2% from two or more races. Ethnically, the population was 4.2% Hispanic or Latino of any race.

== Economic development ==
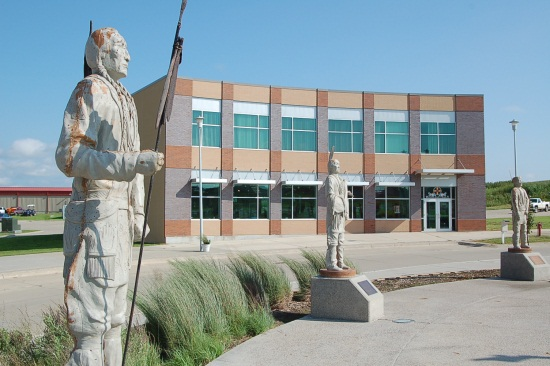
Ho-Chunk Village Statue Garden, Winnebago, NE

In 1992 the federally recognized tribe established the WinnaVegas Casino to generate revenues and provide employment. Its council had already legalized alcohol sales on the reservation, in order to keep the revenues from sales taxes and associated fees that its residents had previously paid through off-reservation merchants to the state. It also now directly regulates the sales and can provide for treatment for individuals and families affected by alcoholism. As of 2007, 63% of federally recognized tribes in the lower 48 states had legalized alcohol sales for similar reasons.

In 1994, based on a long-term view of growth, the tribe founded Ho-Chunk, Inc., its economic development corporation, which has strongly contributed to new resources on the reservation. Beginning with one employee, it has grown to 1400 employees operating in 10 states and five foreign countries. Its revenues have provided for development in 1995 of Little Priest Tribal College; as well as a new community school, hospital and a strong housing construction program of more than $1 million, with development of Ho-Chunk Village.

The rise in its economy has enabled the tribe to improve the quality of life on the reservation, as Lance Morgan, the CEO of the corporation, discussed in a forum at Bellevue University in Bellevue, Nebraska, on April 2, 2010. Ho-Chunk, Inc. has gained awards for small business, and it has initiated a strong housing construction program in collaboration with federal programs. Its leaders were featured on Native American Entrepreneurs, airing in 2009 on PBS. Ho-Chunk, Inc. operates 26 subsidiaries in areas such as information technology, construction, government contracting, green energy, retail, wholesale distribution, marketing, media and transportation.

== See also ==
- Native American tribes in Nebraska
- Reuben Snake, notable person from Winnebago
