= Yellow Thunder =

Chief of the Ho-Chunk tribe (c. 1774 – c. 1874)

Yellow Thunder (c. 1774–1874), was a chief of the Ho-Chunk (or Winnebago) tribe. He signed two treaties with the United States in which his Ho-Chunk name was given as Wa-kun-cha-koo-kah and Waun-kaun-tshaw-zee-kau.

In 1837, Yellow Thunder was part of a Ho-Chunk delegation headed by principal chief Carrymaunee and including noted leader Waukon Decorah, that went to Washington, D.C. to seek redress for American encroachment on their land in Wisconsin. Even though many of the delegates had been U.S. allies during the 1832 Black Hawk War, they were pressured to sign a removal treaty ceding all Ho-Chunk land east of the Mississippi River to the United States. The delegates thought that the treaty gave the Ho-Chunks eight years to leave Wisconsin, which would leave them time to negotiate a new treaty, but the wording on the document gave the tribe eight months to vacate Wisconsin and resettle on reservations in Iowa and Minnesota.

In 1840, U.S. Army General Henry Atkinson was assigned to round up the Ho-Chunks who refused to leave. Two chiefs, Yellow Thunder and Little Soldier, were arrested. Realizing that further resistance would lead to violence against their people, the chiefs agreed to cooperate and were released. Yellow Thunder eventually moved off the Iowa reservation and returned to a 40-acre (160,000 m^{2}) farm near Portage, Wisconsin, where he died in late February, 1874.
