= Mountain Wolf Woman =

Native American woman

- Born: April 1, 1884; East Fork Black River, Wisconsin, US
- Died: November 9, 1960 (aged 76); Black River Falls, Wisconsin, US
- Other name: Xéhachiwinga
- Known for: Native American autobiography

Mountain Wolf Woman, or Xéhachiwinga (April 1, 1884 – November 9, 1960), was a Native American woman of the Ho-Chunk (Winnebago) tribe whose autobiography was one of the earliest firsthand accounts of the experience of a Native American woman.

== Biography ==
She was born April 1, 1884, into the Thunder Clan near Black River Falls, Wisconsin. Her parents were Charles Blowsnake and Lucy Goodvillage. She also had a brother, Sam Blowsnake, whose own story was written by Paul Radin titled Crashing Thunder: The Autobiography of an American Indian. She was brought up in the traditional tribal religion; later, she converted to the Peyote religion (Native American Church) after her second marriage. As was tradition, her brother arranged her marriage and she was pulled out of school. She had been attending the Bureau of Indian Affairs School to learn English. Her marriage ended in divorce and remarried another of her brother's choices, Bad Soldier, after the birth of her second child. Mountain Wolf Woman and Bad Soldier had a total of seven children.

In 1958, she gave her consent to share her story with Nancy Oestreich Lurie and translated in consultation with Frances Thundercloud Wentz. At the time of the interviews for the book, she had eight children, 39 grandchildren, and 11 great-grandchildren. Mountain Wolf Woman was then an early full-length autobiography of an American Indian woman. She died at age 76, on November 9, 1960, at her home in Black River Falls, Wisconsin.

Through her autobiography, Mountain Wolf Woman shared 75 years of Native American life, which included her marriage, the displacement of her family by the U.S. government, and the role of women in native cultures, in contrast to her brother’s book from 35 years earlier, making it a significant contribution.
