= Winnebago Township, Thurston County, Nebraska =

Winnebago Township
- Township
- Location in Thurston County
- Coordinates: 42°14′04″N 096°26′39″W
- Country: United States
- State: Nebraska
- County: Thurston

Area
  - Total: 64.20 sq mi (166.27 km^{2})
  - Land: 63 sq mi (163 km^{2})
  - Water: 1.26 sq mi (3.27 km^{2}) 1.97%
- Elevation: 1,243 ft (379 m)

Population (2020)
  - Total: 2,017
  - Density: 32.0/sq mi (12.4/km^{2})
- GNIS feature ID: 0838334

Winnebago Township is one of eleven townships in Thurston County, Nebraska, United States. The population was 2,017 at the 2020 census.

The Village of Winnebago lies within the Township.

== See also ==
- County government in Nebraska
