= Knights of the Forest =

The Knights of the Forest was a secret organization formed in Mankato, Minnesota, in 1862 or early 1863, with the stated purpose of eliminating all Native Americans from Minnesota. Tribes with reservations in Minnesota at the time included the Anishinaabe or Ojibwe (older publications often use the term Chippewa, generally considered to be a distortion of the name Ojibwe), the Sioux, and the Winnebago (also known as the Ho-Chunk). The Winnebagoes had been removed to Minnesota from Wisconsin where they had displaced a few white settlers. Apparently the Knights of the Forest lasted for several years, but because of the high level of secrecy, no official accounts were published at the time. Years later, accounts began to appear in local publications such as the Mankato Review.

== History ==
This was a time when many settlers voiced strong anti-Native American feelings, calling for their removal or extermination. Several hundred warriors were detained during the Dakota War of 1862. Residents in Garden City and Mankato were angry when President Lincoln authorized General Sibley to hang only 38 of the captured warriors, and the executions were carried out Dec. 26, 1862 in Mankato. Jane Grey Swisshelm was a local editor who just wanted the Native Americans to be removed "quickly" and "cheaply". The Mankato Daily Record challenged Abraham Lincoln to rid the state of the Winnebagoes as a barrier to the town's prosperity. Blue Earth County commissioners sent for "negro bloodhounds" from the South to assist the Knights of the Forest.

The Knights of the Forest lodge in Mankato included many of the most prominent and influential people in Blue Earth County, Minnesota. By 1863, the order had grown to the point where other lodges were established and Mankato became the "grand lodge". Mankato—and possibly other lodges as well—went beyond vocal opposition and actually employed members to shoot any Native Americans who wandered outside of their reservation. The society's policy was underwritten when the state governor, Alexander Ramsey, offered money for the scalps of Dakota people.

To maintain secrecy, members of the Knights of the Forest pledged not to reveal anything about the organization, including its existence. Years later, the Mankato Review published the content of the pledge:

I, _____, of my own free will and accord, in the full belief that every Indian should be removed from the State, by the memory of the inhuman cruelties perpetrated on defenseless citizens, and in the presence of the members of the order here assembled, do most solemnly promise, without any mental reservation whatever, to use every exertion and influence in my power, to cause the removal of all tribes of Indians from the State of Minnesota. I will sacrifice every political and other preference to accomplish that object. I will not aid or assist in any manner to elect to office in this State or the United States any person outside of this order who will not publicly or privately pledge himself for the permanent removal of all tribes of Indians from the State of Minnesota. I will protect and defend at every hazard, all members in carrying out the objects of this order. I will faithfully observe the constitution, rules, and by-laws of this lodge or any grand or working lodge of Knights of the Forest to which I may be attached. I will never in any manner reveal the name, existence, or secrets of this order to any person not entitled to know the same. And in case I should be expelled or voluntarily withdraw from the order, I will consider this obligation still binding. To all of which I pledge my sacred honor.

Many years later, Charles A. Chapman, who had been a member, claimed that it is "very probable that the early removal of the Winnebagoes from the southern part of the state by the United States government was largely due to the efforts of the society". The Winnebagos were forcibly removed in 1863 and sent to reservations in Dakota, where hundreds died on the journey and more died when they arrived because of the harsh conditions.

== See also ==
- Indian removals in Minnesota
