= Ho-Chunk =

Native American people from the Great Lakes, U.S.

Ho-Chunk Hoocągra
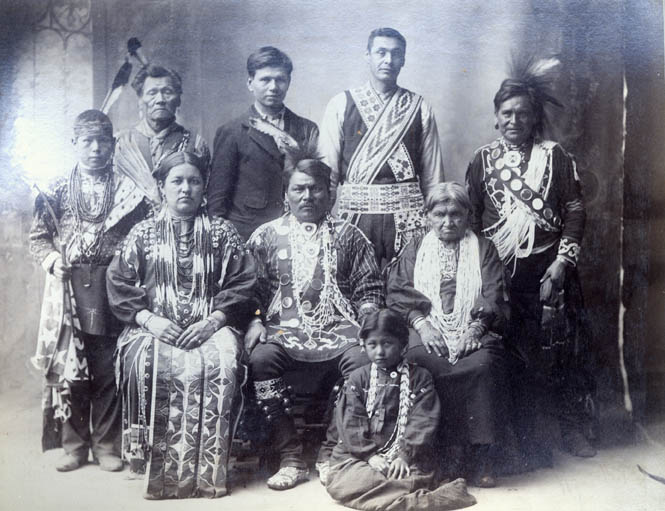
- Ho-Chunk Congress Members in 1898

Total population
- 12,055 (2024)

Regions with significant populations
- United States (Wisconsin, Nebraska, Iowa, and Minnesota)

Languages
- English, Hocąk

Religion
- Traditional Hocąk Way, Native American Church, Christianity

Related ethnic groups
- Iowa, Otoe, and Missouria

Ho-Chunk (Hoocąk) "sacred voice"
- Person: Hoocąk
- People: Hoocąkra
- Language: Hoocą́k hoit'éra Nąąp hoit’e
- Country: Hoocąk Waazija

The Ho-Chunk, also known as Hoocąk, Hoocągra, or Winnebago, are a Siouan-speaking Native American people whose historic territory includes parts of Wisconsin, Minnesota, Iowa, and Illinois. Today, Ho-Chunk people are enrolled in two federally recognized tribes, the Ho-Chunk Nation of Wisconsin and the Winnebago Tribe of Nebraska.

In the Late Woodland Period (650–1200 CE), precontact Ho-Chunks built thousands of effigy mounds in Wisconsin and surrounding states. They are successors to the Oneota culture. Prior to the arrival of Europeans, the Ho-Chunk were the dominant tribe in its territory in the 16th century, with a population estimated at several thousand. They lived in permanent villages of wigwams and cultivated corn, squash, beans, and wild rice. They hunted wild animals and fished from canoes. The name "Ho-Chunk" comes from the word hoocąk and hoocąkra (ho meaning "voice", cąk meaning "sacred", ra being a definite article), meaning "People of the Sacred Voice". Their name comes from oral history that states they are the originators of the many branches of the Siouan language. The Ho-Chunk have 12 clans, each with specific roles. Wars with the Illinois Confederacy and later wars with the Ojibwe, Potawatomi, Meskwaki, and Sauk peoples pushed them out of their territories in eastern Wisconsin and Illinois, along with conflicts with the United States, such as Winnebago War and Black Hawk War. The Ho-Chunk suffered severe population loss in the 17th century to a low of perhaps 500 individuals. This has been attributed to casualties of a lake storm, epidemics of infectious disease, and competition for resources from migrating Algonquian tribes. By the early 19th century, their population had increased to 2,900, but they suffered further losses in the smallpox epidemic of 1836. In 1990, they numbered 7,000; current estimates of total population of the two tribes are 12,000.

Through a series of moves imposed by the U.S. government in the 19th century, the tribe was relocated to reservations increasingly further west, in Wisconsin, Iowa, Minnesota, South Dakota, and finally Nebraska. Oral history suggests some of the tribe may have been forcibly relocated up to 13 times by the federal government through forced treaty cession, losses estimated at 30 million acres in Wisconsin alone (they ceded lands in Wisconsin in 1829, 1832, and 1837; further removal attempts occurred in Wisconsin in 1840, 1846, 1850, and 1873–1874). During these removals, bands of Ho-Chunk hid out in Wisconsin rather than be moved.

In 1832, other bands of Ho-Chunk were moved to the Neutral Ground Reservation in eastern Iowa and the southeastern tip of Minnesota, where they faced hostile conditions between the warring Dakota people and Sauk peoples and a smallpox outbreak. In 1846, they signed a treaty that exchanged the Neutral Ground lands for a new reservation known as "Long Prairie Reservation" in Todd County, Minnesota. In 1855, this group signed its final treaty for Minnesota land giving back the Long Prairie Reservation in exchange for land near Mankato, Minnesota. This new reservation was referred to as the "Blue Earth Reservation". After the Dakota War of 1862 and tensions created by the hate group Knights of the Forest, about 2,000 Ho-Chunk were interned at Camp Porter in Mankato before being expelled from Minnesota to Crow Creek, South Dakota, in 1863.

The Ho-Chunk often nonviolently resisted removal by staying home, or simply returning home, rather than engaging in uprisings. Poor conditions at Crow Creek led many Ho-Chunk to leave for the Omaha Reservation in Nebraska. The Winnebago Reservation was founded for the Ho-Chunk in Nebraska in 1865. The Ho-Chunk Nation of Wisconsin is considered a "non-reservation" tribe, as members historically had to acquire individual homesteads to regain title to ancestral territory. They hold land in more than 13 counties in Wisconsin and have land in Illinois. The federal government has granted legal reservation status to some of these parcels, but the Ho-Chunk Nation does not have a contiguous reservation. While related, the two tribes are distinct federally recognized sovereign nations and peoples, each with its own constitutionally formed government and completely separate governing and business interests. Since the late 20th century, both tribal councils have authorized the development of casinos. The Ho-Chunk Nation is working on language restoration and has developed a Hoocąk-language iOS app and online dictionary.

== Name ==
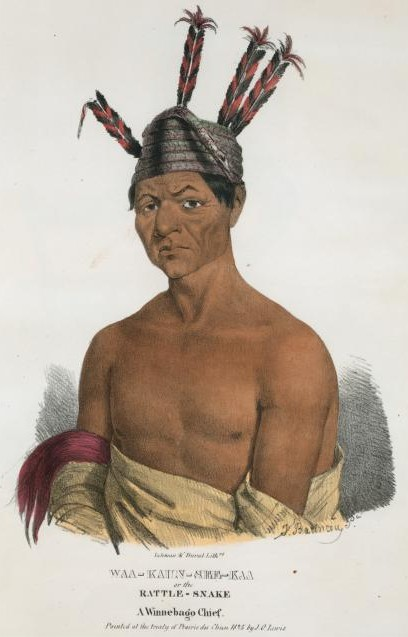
Chief Waukon Decorah in 1825

The Ho-Chunk speak a Siouan language, which they believe was given to them by their creator, Mą’ųna (Earthmaker). Their native name is Ho-Chunk (or Hoocạk), which has been variously translated as "sacred voice" or "People of the Big Voice", meaning mother tongue, as in they originated the Siouan language family.

Neighboring Siouan tribes refer to the Ho-Chunk by translations of their name into their language, such as Hotúŋe in the Iowa-Otoe language) or Hotháŋka in the Dakota language. The term "Winnebago" is a term used by the Potawatomi, pronounced as "Winnipego". Winnebago was later adopted by the French and English, and today refers to the Winnebago Tribe of Nebraska.

The Jesuit Relations of 1659–1660 said:

He started, in the month of June of the year one thousand six hundred and fifty-eight, from the lake of the Ouinipegouek, which is strictly only a large bay in lake Huron. It is called by others, the lake of the stinkards, not because it is salt like the water of the Sea—which the Savages call Ouinipeg, or stinking water—but because it is surrounded by sulphurous soil, whence issue several springs which convey into this lake the impurities absorbed by their waters in the places of their origin.

Nicolas Perrot was a 17th-century French trader who believed that the Algonquian terms referred to saltwater seas, as these have a distinctive aroma compared with freshwater lakes. An early Jesuit record says that the name refers to the origin of Le Puans near the saltwater seas to the north. When the explorers Jean Nicolet and Samuel de Champlain learned of the "sea" connection to the tribe's name, they were optimistic that it meant Les Puans were from or had lived near the Pacific Ocean. They hoped it indicated a passage to China via the great rivers of the Midwest.

== Culture ==
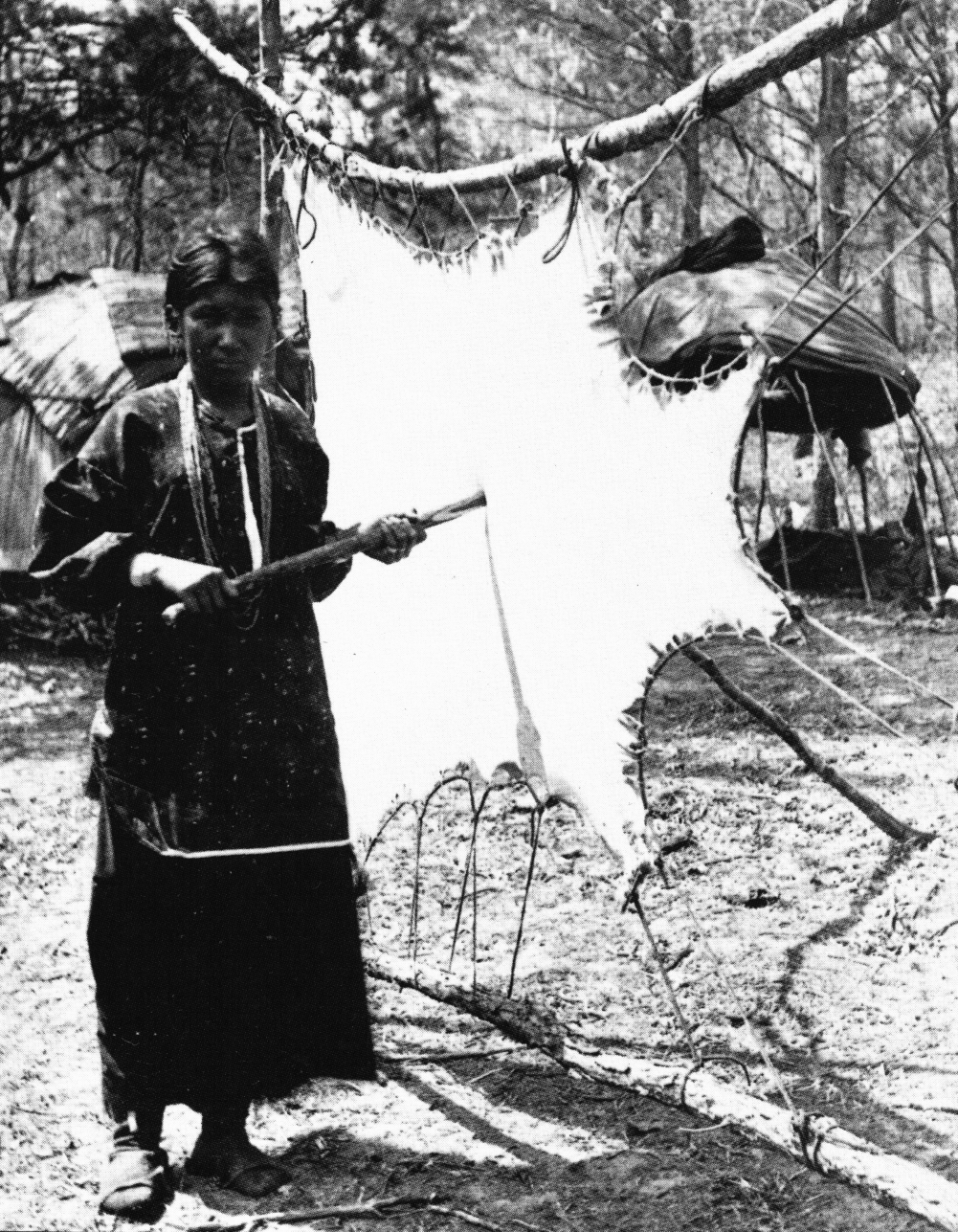
A Ho-Chunk woman stretching a deerhide as part of the tanning process, 1880

Before Europeans entered into Ho-Chunk territory, they were nomadic and intimately knew their vast homelands. They farmed, hunted, and gathered wild foods from local sources, including nuts, berries, roots, and edible leaves. They knew what the forest and river's edge had to give. With the changing seasons, Ho-Chunk families moved from area to area to find food. For example, many families returned to Black River Falls, Wisconsin, to pick berries in the summer.

All genders had culturally defined roles in making best use of resources. Ho-Chunk women were responsible for growing, gathering, and processing food for their families, including the cultivation of varieties of corn and squash, to have different types through the growing season; and gathering a wide variety of roots, nuts, and berries, as well as sap from maple trees. In addition, women learned to recognize and use a wide range of roots and leaves for medicinal and herbal purposes. The maple sap was used to make syrup and candy. Women also processed and cooked game, making dried meats combined with berries to sustain their families when traveling. Tanned hides were used to make clothing and storage bags. They used most parts of the game for tools, binding, clothing, and coverings for dwellings. They were responsible for the survival of the families, caring for the children, as well as elders.

The main role of the Ho-Chunk man was as a hunter—and a warrior when needed. Leaders among the men interfaced with other tribes. As hunters, they speared fish and clubbed them to death. The men also hunted game such as muskrat, mink, otter, beaver, and deer. Some men learned to create jewelry and other body decorations out of silver and copper, for both men and women. To become men, boys would go through a rite of passage at puberty; they fasted for a period during which they were expected to acquire a guardian spirit; without it, their lives would be miserable.

Besides having a guardian spirit, men would also try to acquire protection and powers from specific spirits, which was done by making offerings along with tobacco. For example, a man would not go on the warpath without first performing the "war-bundle feast", which contained two parts. The first part honored the night-spirits and the second part honored the Thunderbird spirit. The blessings these spirits gave the men were embodied in objects that together made the war bundle. These objects could include feathers, bones, skins, flutes, and paints.

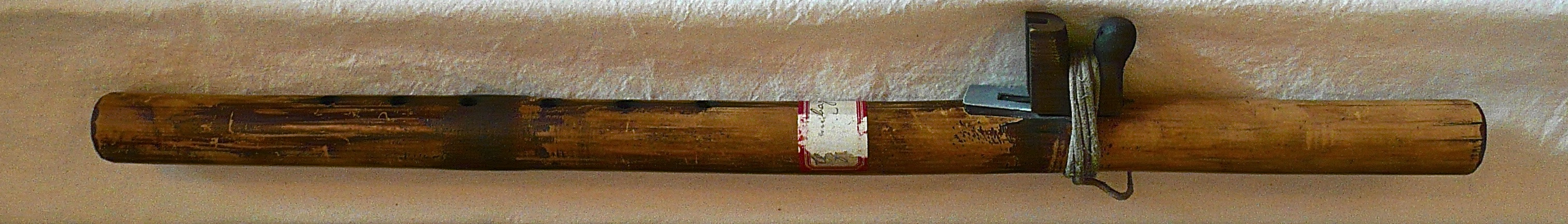
Winnebago courting flute

== History ==
=== Ancestral Ho-Chunk ===
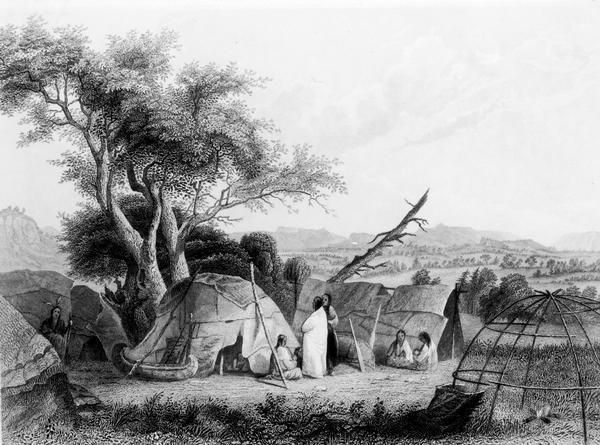
Winnebago family in 1852

Ho-Chunk oral history says they have always lived in their current homelands of Wisconsin, Minnesota, Iowa, Missouri, and Illinois. Their Siouan language indicates common origin with other peoples of this language group. They say their ancestors built the thousands of effigy mounds through Wisconsin and surrounding states during the Late Woodland period. In the Terminal Late Woodland Period, the practice of building effigy mounds abruptly ceased with the appearance of the Oneota Culture. The Ho-Chunk claim descendancy from both the effigy mound-building Late Woodland cultures and the successor Oneota Culture. The tribe began cultivating maize at the end of the Late Woodland period, while they continued to hunt, fish, and gather wild plants. They cultivated wild rice (Zizania spp.) and harvested sugar from sugar maple trees.

Dugout canoes found near many small lakes and rivers are prompting new anthropological research projects near Madison, Wisconsin, that may yield better information about ancient settlements.

=== European contact and tribe split ===
European contact came in 1634 with the arrival of French explorer Jean Nicolet. He wrote that the Winnebago/Ho-Chunk occupied the area around Green Bay of Lake Michigan in Wisconsin, reaching beyond Lake Winnebago to the Wisconsin River and to the Rock River in Illinois. The oral history also indicates that in the mid-16th century, the influx of Ojibwe peoples in the northern portion of their lands caused the Ho-Chunk to move to the south of their territory. They had some friction with the tribes of the Illinois Confederacy as well as fellow Chiwere-speaking peoples splitting from the Ho-Chunk. These groups, who became the Iowa, Missouria, and Otoe tribes, moved south and west because the reduced range made it difficult for such a large population to be sustained.

=== Population decline ===
Nicolet reported a gathering of approximately 5,000 warriors as the Ho-Chunk entertained him. Historians estimate that the population in 1634 may have ranged from 8,000 to more than 20,000. Between that time and the first return of French trappers and traders in the late 1650s, the population was reduced drastically. Later reports were that the Ho-Chunk numbered only about 500. When numerous Algonquian tribes migrated west to escape the aggressive Iroquois tribes in the Beaver Wars, they competed for game and resources with the Ho-Chunk, who had to yield to their greater numbers.

The reasons historians give for the reduction in population vary, but they agree on three major causes: the loss of several hundred warriors in a storm on a lake, infectious disease epidemics after contact with Europeans, and attacks by the Illinois Confederacy. The warriors were said to be lost on Lake Michigan after they had repulsed the first attack by invading the Potawatomi from what is now Door County, Wisconsin. Another says the number was 600. Another claim is that the 500 were lost in a storm on Lake Winnebago during a failed campaign against the Meskwaki, while yet another says it was in a battle against the Sauk. Even with such a serious loss of warriors, the historian R. David Edmunds notes that it was not enough to cause the near elimination of an entire people. He suggests two additional causes. The Winnebago apparently suffered from a widespread disease, perhaps an epidemic of one of the European infectious diseases. They had no immunity to the new diseases and suffered high rates of fatalities. Ho-Chunk accounts said the victims turned yellow, which is not a trait of smallpox. Historians have rated disease as the major reason for the losses in all Native American populations. Edmunds notes as a third cause of the population decline the following historic account: decimation by the Illinois Confederacy. The Ho-Chunk had been helped at one time by many of their enemies, in particular the Illinois Confederacy, during their time of suffering and famine, aggravated by the loss of their hunters. The Winnebago then attacked the Illinois Confederacy. Enraged, additional Illinois warriors retaliated and killed nearly all the Ho-Chunk.

After peace was established between the French and Iroquois in 1701, many of the Algonquian peoples returned to their homelands to the east. The Ho-Chunk were then relieved of that pressure on their territory and after 1741, most returned inland. From a low of perhaps less than 500, the population gradually recovered, aided by intermarriage with neighboring tribes and some of the French traders and trappers. A count from 1736 gives a population of 700; in 1806, they numbered more than 2,900. A census in 1846 reported 4,400 people but by 1848, there were reportedly 2,500. Like other Native American tribes, the Ho-Chunk suffered great losses during the smallpox epidemics of 1757–58 and 1836. In the 19th-century epidemic, they lost nearly a quarter of their population. Today the Ho-Chunk population is about 12,000.

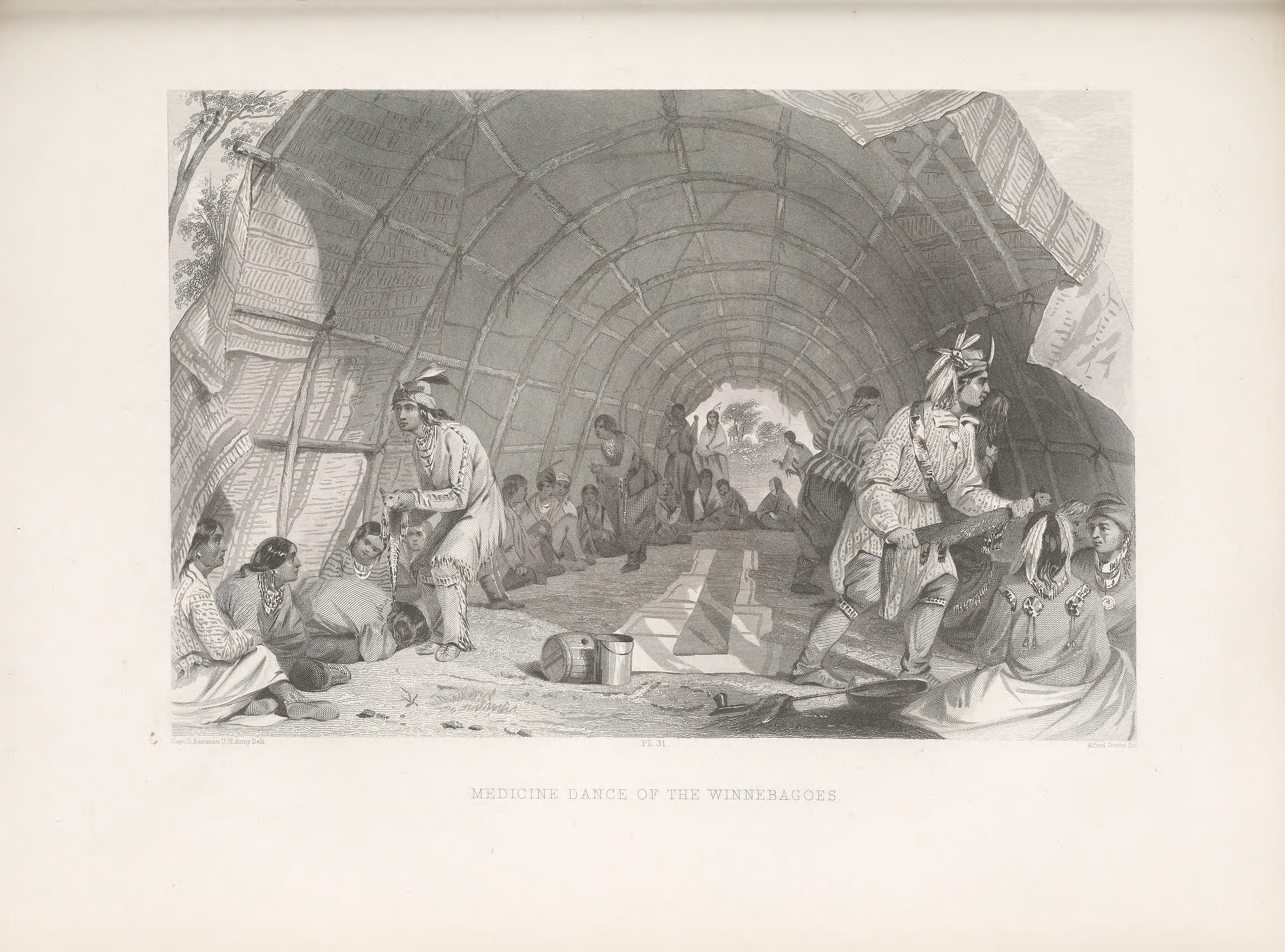
"Medicine Dance of the Winnebago" by Seth Eastman

The Black Hawk War of 1832 was fought largely on Ho-Chunk land. In early 1832, White Cloud invited the Sauk band to live in the Rock River band's Illinois villages. About 1,200 Ho-Chunk, Fox, Kickapoo, and others came, from locations such as Saukenuk on the Iowa reservation, where there was little food. The arrivals included Black Sparrow Hawk, who had been a leading warrior of the British Band during the War of 1812.

=== Series of forced removals ===
Through a series of moves imposed by the U.S. government in the 19th century, the tribe was relocated to reservations increasingly further west: in Wisconsin, Minnesota, South Dakota, and finally Nebraska. Oral history suggests some of the tribe may have been forcibly relocated up to 13 times by the federal government to steal land through forced treaty cession, losses estimated at 30 million acres in Wisconsin alone, however only ten million acres of land was recognized by the treaties between the U.S and the Ho-Chunk. The Ho-Chunk often nonviolently resisted removal by staying home, or simply returning home, rather than engaging in uprisings.

The Winnebago ceded lands in Wisconsin in 1829, 1832 and 1837; further removal attempts occurred in Wisconsin in 1840, 1846, 1850, and 1873–4.

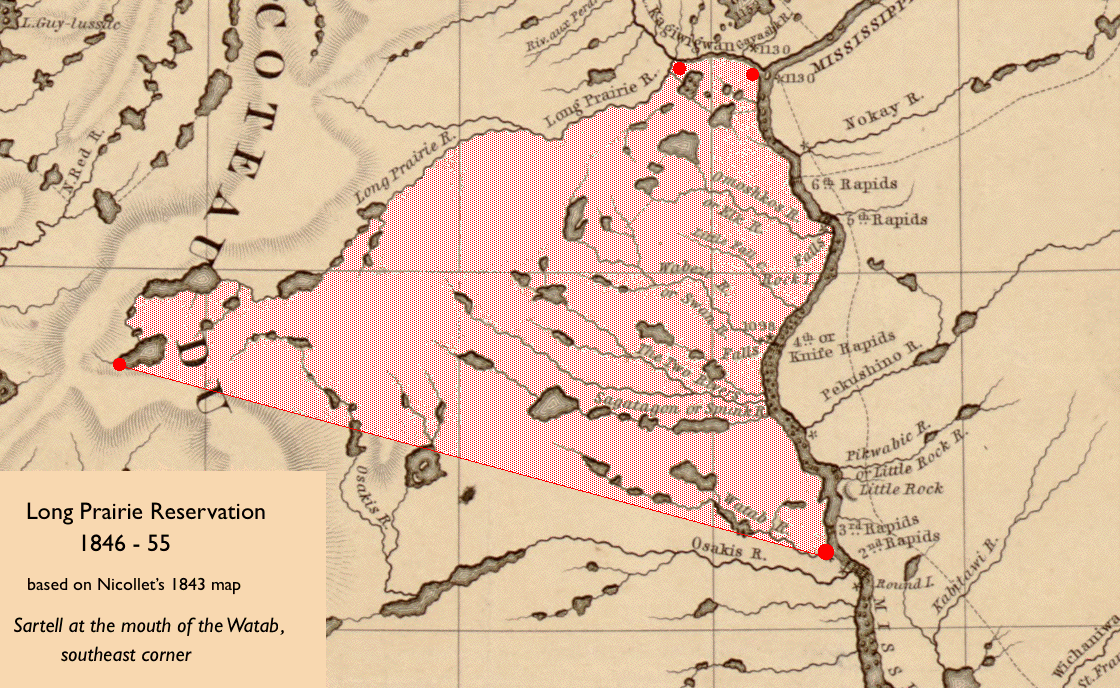
Winnebago 1846 Reservation, Nicollet's 1843 map.

The 1848 removal from Iowa was documented by a soldier in Morgan's Mounted Volunteers. About 2,500 people were forced to travel by wagon, on foot, and on horseback from Fort Atkinson, Iowa to Winona, Minnesota, and thence by steamboat to a new Reservation covering parts of Stearns, Morrison, and Todd Counties, and with its agency at Long Prairie, Minnesota. The Long Prairie Reservation, which was heavily wooded, was more suitable for logging than for farming. Writing in 1915, St. Cloud, Minnesota journalist and local historian William Bell Mitchell recalled that as of 1850, the Ho-Chunk "had one of their main villages on the west bank of the Mississippi River", and at the mouth of the Watab River in what is now Sartell, Minnesota. The Long Prairie Reservation was dissolved in 1855, and its residents were moved to the Blue Earth Reservation, Minnesota. While relating a May 1860 series of raids and revenge killings between the Chippewa and Dakota peoples in which one Ho-Chunk warrior was also killed in Maine Prairie Township, Stearns County, Minnesota, George W. Sweet, a pioneer settler of Sauk Rapids, recalled, "The Winnebagoes were supposed to be a neutral party between the Sioux and Chippewa, but occasionally a Winnebago would join a party of Sioux on a raid against the Chippewas."

During the 1862 Dakota War, a very small faction of the Ho-Chunk led by Chief Little Priest joined forces with the uprising and its figurehead leader, Chief Little Crow. This had disastrous results for all the Ho-Chunk living in Minnesota.

=== Reservations formation ===
In 1863, the Ho-Chunk were forced to leave their Blue Earth Reservation by the Knights of the Forest, a secret society hate group organized by vengeful prominent pioneer settlers in nearby Mankato. Blue Earth County commissioners sent for "negro bloodhounds" from the South to assist the Knights of the Forest. The Knights sent armed men to surround the Ho-Chunks' prime farmland and shoot any Ho-Chunk who crossed the line. About 2,000 Ho-Chunk were interned at Camp Porter in Mankato, and thence removed to the Crow Creek Indian Reservation in Dakota Territory. Poor conditions at Crow Creek led many Ho-Chunk to leave for an Omaha reservation in Nebraska. The Winnebago Reservation was founded for the Ho-Chunk in Nebraska in 1865.

Following the forced relocations, many tribe members returned to previous homes, especially in Wisconsin, despite the U.S. Army's repeated roundups and forced removals. But the federal government finally allowed the Winnebago to resettle and acquire land in their ancestral homeland in Wisconsin, which eventually received recognition as an official Reservation known as the Ho-Chunk Nation of Wisconsin. The Ho-Chunk in Nebraska have gained independent federal recognition as a tribe and have a reservation in Thurston County. The Ho-Chunk Nation now has a constitution that reinforces its sovereign abilities to negotiate with the U.S. government.

Waukon and Decorah, county seats of Allamakee and Winneshiek County, Iowa, respectively, were named after the 19th-century Ho-Chunk Chief Waukon Decorah.

== Ho-Chunk clans ==
Before the U.S. government removed the Ho-Chunk from their native land in Wisconsin, the tribe consisted of 12 clans (see table). In pre-contact Ho-Chunk society, clans were typically associated with specific social roles; for instance, the Thunderbird Clan was the clan from which chiefs were appointed, while the Bear Clan enforced discipline within the community and oversaw prisoners.

Hokiikarac – Ho-Chunk Clans
Name	Translation
Wakąja	Thunderbird
Wonąǧire Wąąkšik	People of War
Caxšep	Eagle
Rucge	Pigeon
Hųc	Bear
Šųkjąk	Wolf
Wakjexi	Water-spirit
Ca	Deer
Hųųwą	Elk
Cexjį	Buffalo
Ho	Fish
Waką	Snake

The clans were associated with animal spirits representing the traditional responsibilities within the nation; each clan had a role in the survival of the people. Like other Native Americans, the Ho-Chunk had rules generally requiring people to marry outside their clans. The kinship system was based in the family and gave structure to descent and inheritance rules. Although the tribe is patrilineal today, anthropologists believe they may have had a matrilineal kinship system in the 17th century before their major losses. At that time, the matriarchs of a clan would name its chief and they could reclaim the position if they disapproved of his actions. The Ho-Chunk may have shifted to the patrilineal system due to marriage into other tribes or under the influence of the male-oriented fur trade.

Today there are two federally recognized tribes of Ho-Chunk people, the Ho-Chunk Nation of Wisconsin and the Winnebago Tribe of Nebraska.

=== Ho-Chunk Nation ===
This tribe is headquartered in Black River Falls, Wisconsin. Formerly known as the Wisconsin Winnebago Tribe, it changed its name to "Ho-Chunk Nation" to take back the traditional Siouan name. Ho-Chunk usually call themselves Hoocąk waaziija haci meaning "sacred voice people of the Pines". They also call themselves wąąkšik – "people". They are the larger of the two federally recognized Ho-Chunk tribes.

The Ho-Chunk have established the Hoocąk Waaziija Haci Language and Culture Division, which has developed materials to teach and restore use of the Hocąk language and other elements of their culture. Among its recent innovations is the development of a Hocąk-language app for the iPhone. The Ho-Chunk have about 200 native speakers among its elders.

Of the 7,192 tribal members as of May 2011, 5,042 lived in Wisconsin. The tribes own 4,602 acres (18.625 km^{2}) scattered across parts of 12 counties in Wisconsin and one in Minnesota. The largest concentrations are in Jackson, Clark, and Monroe counties in Wisconsin. Smaller areas lie in Adams, Crawford, Dane, Juneau, La Crosse, Marathon, Rock, Sauk, Shawano, and Wood counties in Wisconsin. The Ho-Chunk Nation also owns land in Lynwood, Illinois.

==== Government ====
The Ho-Chunk Nation established a written constitution and is governed by an elected council. As of 2023, the current president is Jon Greendeer.

Since the late 20th century, the tribe operates six casinos in Wisconsin, in order to raise funds:

- Ho-Chunk Gaming Wisconsin Dells in Baraboo,
- Ho-Chunk Gaming Black River Falls
- Ho-Chunk Gaming Nekoosa
- Ho-Chunk Gaming Wittenberg
- Ho-Chunk Gaming Tomah
- Ho-Chunk Gaming Madison

In February 2013, the Beloit Common Council sold land to the Ho-Chunk Nation for a proposed casino. The council has used revenues to enhance infrastructure, healthcare, and educational support for its people. The casino officially opened for business in October, 2026.

In 1988, the Ho-Chunk Nation filed a timely claim for transfer of the Badger Army Ammunition Plant (BAAP), which was to be declared surplus under federal regulations. As part of their former traditional territory, the property holds historical, archeological, sacred, and cultural resources important to their people. It is a 1500-acre parcel in Sauk County, Wisconsin. Between 1998 and 2011, the Army spent millions of dollars in environmental assessments and cleanup to prepare the property for transfer. In 1998 the Secretary of the Interior had issued a letter to claim the land on behalf of the Ho-Chunk but in 2011, the Bureau of Indian Affairs (BIA) refused to accept the property. It was unwilling to conduct an environmental assessment due to cost.

In 2012, the National Congress of American Indians (NCAI) passed a resolution in support of the Ho-Chunk and to encourage the BIA to accept surplus lands in trust on behalf of tribes. Finally, through a special act of congress, the Ho-Chunk Nation took control of the 1500-acre parcel in 2015. This is regarded as the first time that the United States' military has ever returned land to an indigenous people. Today, the Ho-Chunk Nation is restoring the prairie that was present at the site before European settlement.

=== Winnebago Tribe of Nebraska ===
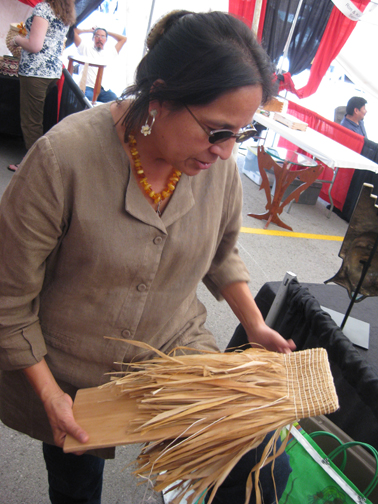
Martha Gradolf, a contemporary weaver, is enrolled in the Winnebago Tribe of Nebraska.

The tribe has a reservation in northeastern Nebraska and western Iowa. The Winnebago Indian Reservation lies primarily in the northern part of Thurston and a small part of Dixon counties in Nebraska, with an additional portion in Woodbury County, Iowa. A small plot of off-reservation land of 116.75 acres (0.4725 km^{2}) is in southern Craig Township in Burt County, Nebraska. The total land area is 457.857 km^{2} (176.78 sq mi).

They refer to themselves as Hoocąk nįšoc haci meaning "sacred voice people living on the Missouri River".

The Iowa portion was originally west of the Missouri River and within Nebraska boundaries. After the United States Army Corps of Engineers changed the course of the river, some of the reservation land was redefined as falling within the boundaries of Iowa. The tribe successfully argued that the land belonged to them under the terms of the deed prior to diversion of the river. This land has a postal address of Sloan, Iowa, as rural addresses are normally covered by the nearest post office.

The 2000 census reported a population of 2,588 people living on these lands. The largest community is the village of Winnebago, with others in Emerson and Thurston, Nebraska. In 2006 their enrolled population was estimated at 4,000.

The federally recognized Omaha also have a reservation in Thurston County. Together, the Native American tribes occupy the entire land area of Thurston County.

==== Government ====
The Winnebago Tribe of Nebraska has a written constitution and is governed by an elected nine-person council.

Since 1992 the Winnebago tribe has owned and operated the WinnaVegas Casino on its lands in Iowa. The tribe legalized alcohol sales to keep liquor tax revenue, earmarked for supporting individuals and families affected by alcoholism. More than 60% of federally recognized tribes in the lower 48 states have legalized alcohol sales.

In 1994 the tribe established Ho-Chunk, Inc., an economic development corporation that now employs 1400 people. Its success has earned the tribe small business organization awards. It has initiated a strong housing construction program in collaboration with federal programs. Its leaders were featured on Native American Entrepreneurs in 2009 on PBS.

== Land claims ==
According to Gordon Thunder (Wakąja), the Ho-Chunk have been systematically removed from their homelands, many now occupied by other tribes. The Ho-Chunk Nation of Wisconsin, which at one time consisted primarily of tribal members spread over 13 counties of Wisconsin, have a historical territorial claim in an area encompassed by a line from Green Bay to Long Prairie to St. Louis to Chicago. Some in the federal and state governments have undermined the Ho-Chunk land claims; however, repatriation activities document where many villages once stood.

== Notable Ho-Chunk people ==
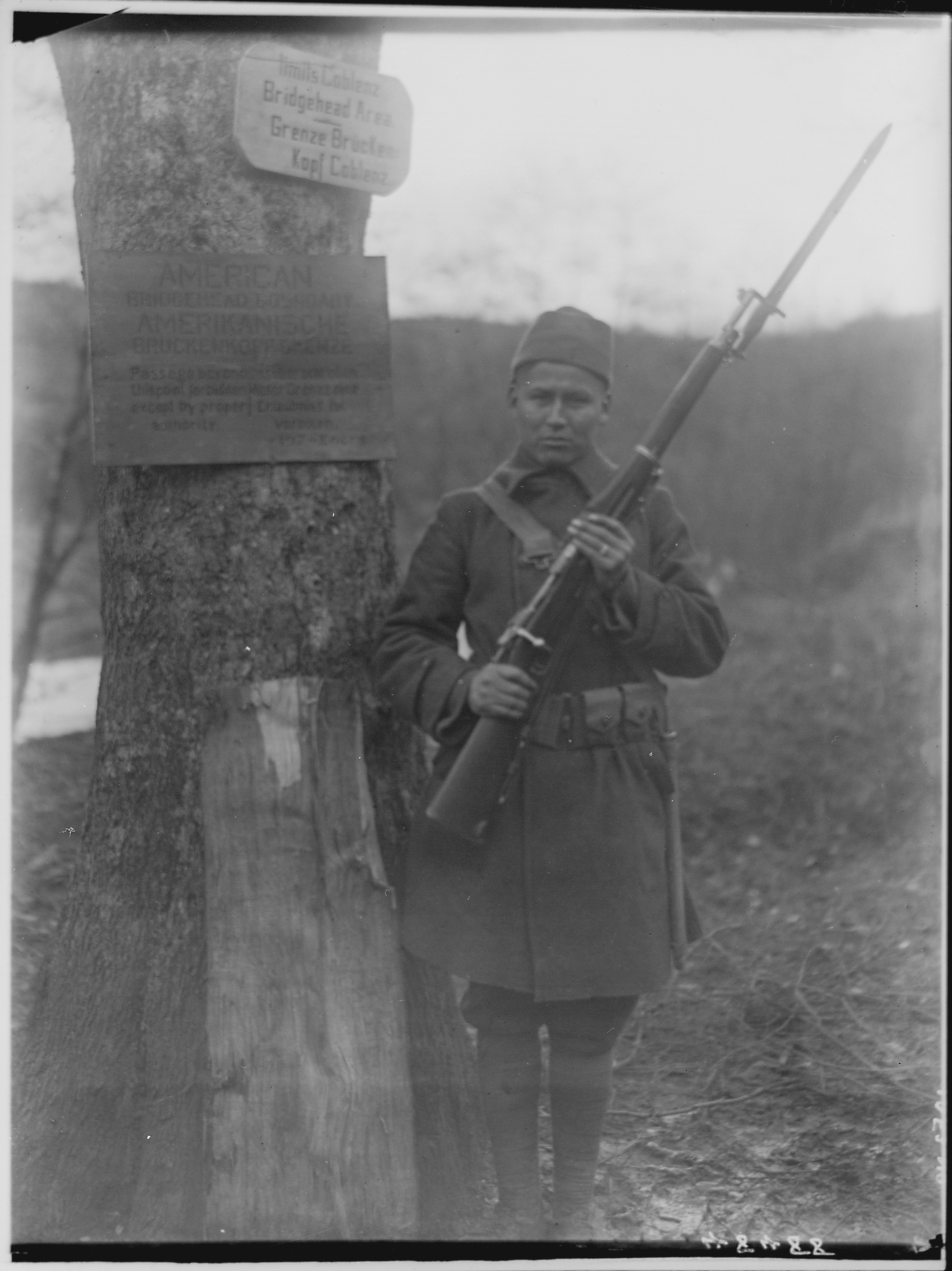
Cpl. George Miner, a Ho Chunk, of the U.S. Army of Occupation of Germany 1919

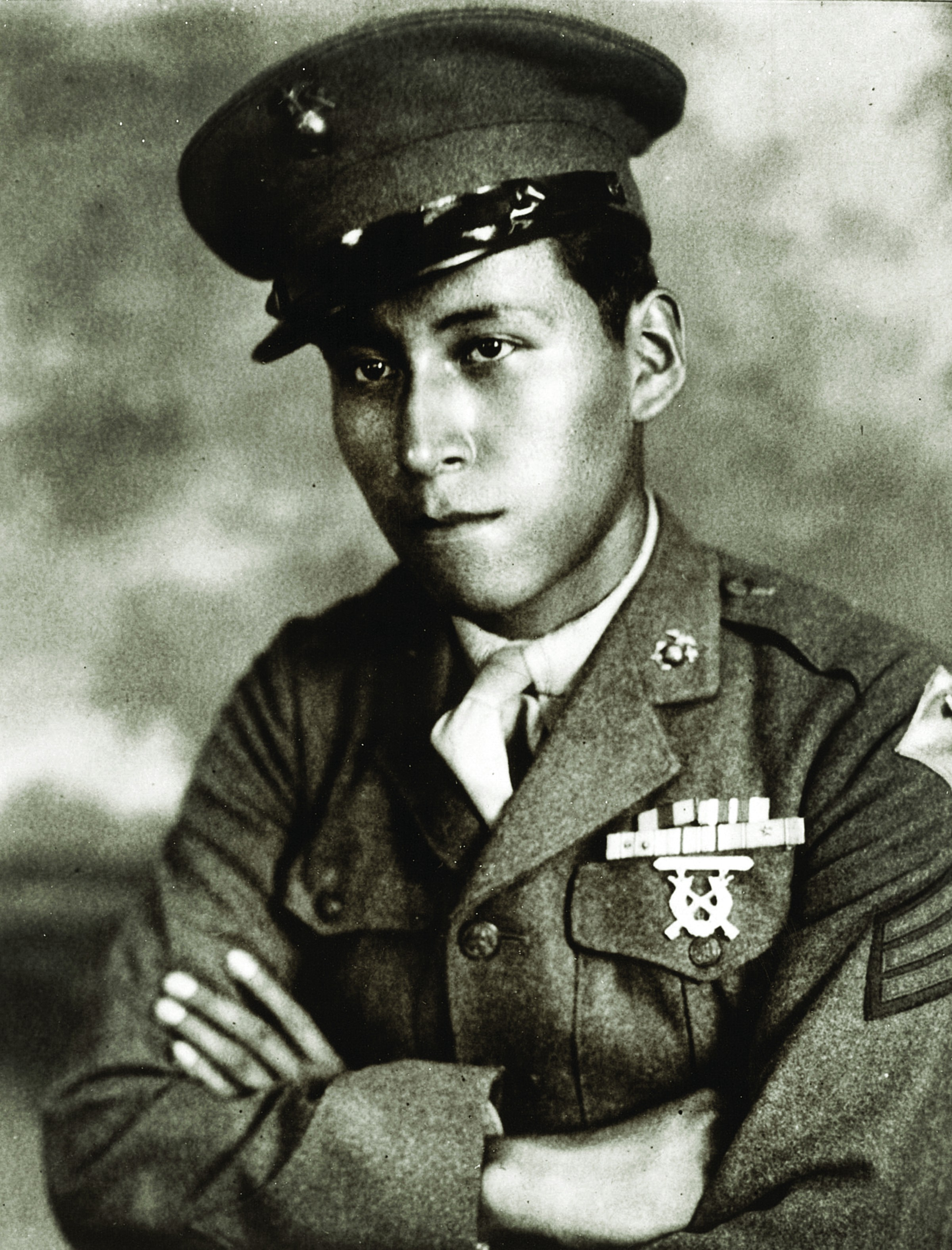
Cpl. Mitchell Red Cloud Jr., Korean War Medal of Honor recipient

- Angel De Cora, artist and educator
- Joba Chamberlain, Major league baseball pitcher
- Henry Roe Cloud, born 1884, Yale graduate, educator
- Glory of the Morning, 18th-century chief
- Willard LaMere, educational leader and co-founder of the Native American Educational Services (NAES) College in Chicago
- Hononegah, co-founder of Rockton, Illinois
- Bronson Koenig, All Big-Ten basketball player from University of Wisconsin-Madison from 2013 to 2017
- Truman Lowe, artist
- Reuben Snake, activist and tribal leader
- Red Bird, chief and leader during the 1827 Winnebago War
- Mitchell Red Cloud, Jr., Korean War Medal of Honor recipient
- Red Wing (also known as Lillian St. Cyr), film actress
- John Raymond Rice, World War II and Korean War hero, recipient of the Bronze Star
- Chief Waukon Decorah, warrior and orator
- Mountain Wolf Woman, an early 20th-century convert to the Peyote religion
- Chief Yellow Thunder (also known as Waun-kaun-tshaw-zee-kau)
- Betsy Thunder, Traditional doctor
- Sharice Davids (b. 1980), assumed office in 2019 as the U.S. representative from Kansas's 3rd congressional district, one of the first Native American women elected to Congress
- Sam Blowsnake, author
- Frank LaMere, activist and politician

== See also ==
- Ho-Chunk mythology
- Winnebago language
- Badger Army Ammunition Plant
- Doty Island
- Native American tribes in Nebraska
- Indian removals in Minnesota
