= Glory of the Morning =

Female chief of the Ho-Chunk

- Hąboguwįga
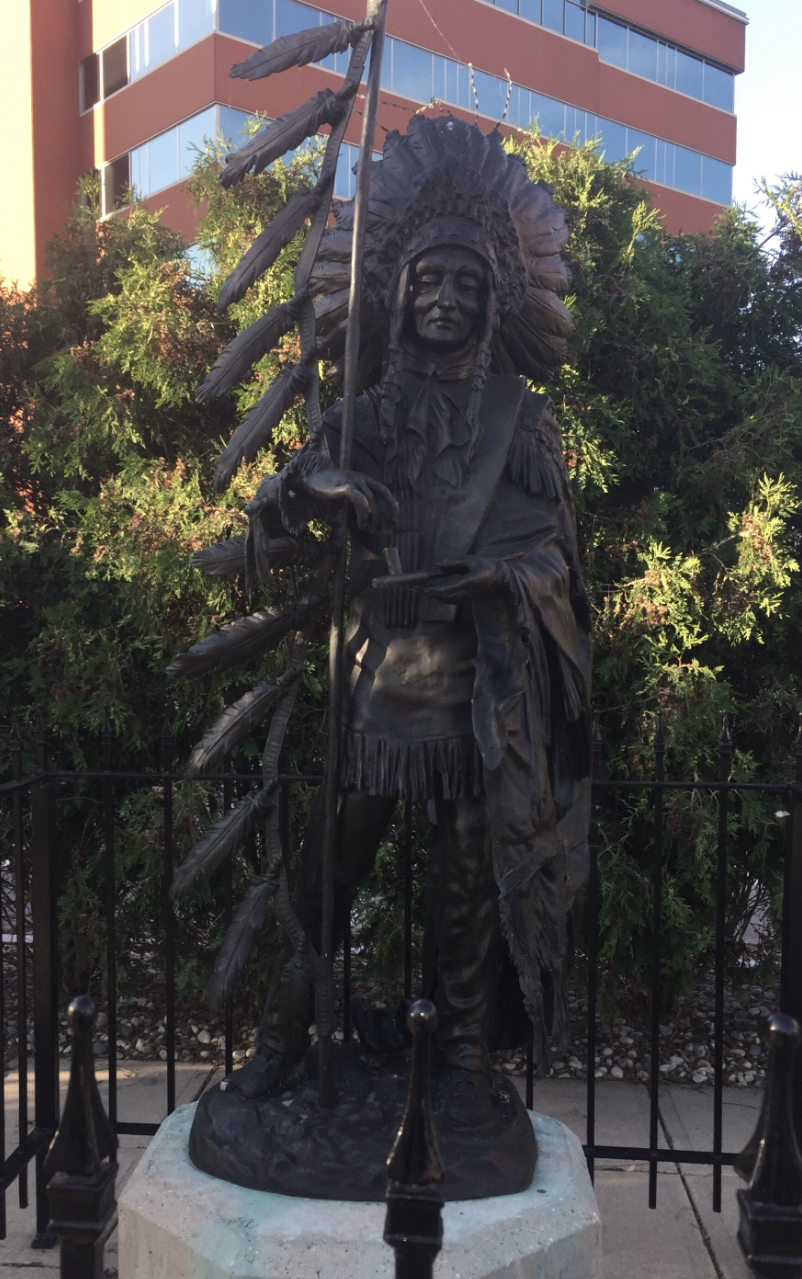
- Statue of Chief Hąboguwįga in Neenah, Wisconsin
- Born: 1708–1709 or 1711; Doty Island
- Died: Unknown
- Known for: Chief of the Ho-Chunk
- Relatives: Chief Waukon Decorah (grandson)

Hąboguwįga, (Note: Other variants of Hąboguwįga's native name include Habogųįga, Ho-poe-kaw, Haarpokewinga, and Hopokoekau (as in Hopokoekau Beach).) known in English as Glory of the Morning, was a leader of the Ho-Chunk during the 18th century and the first woman recorded in the history of Wisconsin. She was the last known female Ho-Chunk chief.

== Background ==
The Ho-Chunk were likely a matriarchal society before European contact. Following destructive wars with the neighboring Illinois Confederation and the introduction of the fur trade in the 17th century, Ho-Chunk society underwent a restructuring to adapt to new circumstances. However, elements of matriarchy remained in Ho-Chunk culture. According to historian Patrick Jung, "these matrilineal elements provided the cultural mechanisms by which a Ho-Chunk woman, Hąboguwįga (Glory of the Morning), became a leader of her people in the eighteenth century." From the mid 17th century until the mid 18th century, the Ho-Chunk population was probably under 1,000 people.

== Biography ==
Hąboguwįga was born in either 1708-1709 or 1711. Ho-Chunk folklore relates that she was born in May, the month of the Digging Moon, to a Thunder Clan father and Eagle Clan mother. The Ho-Chunk in that period were principally based in a village on Doty Island, near what is now Neenah. According to one story, she was the only child of the chief of the Ho-Chunk people. Another story states that she had brothers, but none of them were deemed worthy to succeed as chief.

At around age 18, she was chosen to succeed her father as chief of their village. The election of a woman as chief resulted in around half of the Ho-Chunk migrating west to the Mississippi Valley. When Joseph Marin de la Malgue traveled to Hąboguwįga's village in 1753, this faction had reconciled with her leadership. During the Fox Wars of the 1730s, she allied with the French and eventually helped negotiate peace in 1737. According to oral tradition, she led campaigns against the Meskwaki in the Fox Wars and the British coalition in the French and Indian War.

In 1766, the colonial American explorer Jonathan Carver visited Hąboguwįga's village and wrote an account of Ho-Chunk society of the time. How long Hąboguwįga lived after Carver's visit is unknown.

=== Family ===
In 1729 or 1730, Hąboguwįga married French-Canadian fur trader Joseph Sabrevoir Décarrie. They had two sons and one daughter. After 7–8 years, Décarrie returned to Quebec with their daughter Nąnoap ("Oakleaf") and died in 1760 towards the end of the French and Indian War. Nąnoap remained in Quebec and married a merchant in Montreal, never reuniting with her mother.

Hąboguwįga's elder son Čugiga ("Spoon" or "Ladle") became chief of a village near present-day Portage, while her younger son Čap'ósgaga ("White Breast" or "Buzzard") established a village in the La Crosse area.

== Descendants and legacy ==
One of Hąboguwįga's sons signed a treaty with the United States in 1816, and his son Waukon Decorah signed the treaties of 1828–1832, with several other relatives acting as diplomats.

Hąboguwįga's descendants became the Decorahs (a derivation from her husband's name), an important family of Ho-Chunk chiefs and merchants. Decorah remains one of the most common surnames among Ho-Chunk. One of Hąboguwįga's descendants was Mitchell Red Cloud Jr., a 20th-century Medal of Honor recipient and inductee to the Indian Hall of Fame.

=== Scholarly assessment ===
The question of whether Hąboguwįga wielded significant power or was purely a figurehead has been subject to discussion. Jonathan Carver and Paul Radin believed that she was only a symbolic leader with little power, owing to her gender. Radin argued that any power she may have had could be attributed to her marriage to a French fur trader. More recent scholarship has disputed this assertion: Hąboguwįga participated in national councils which were only open to women who possessed special supreme authority, and her sons' positions were recognized by virtue of descent from her.
