= Winnebago War =

1827 conflict in United States

- Part of the American Indian Wars
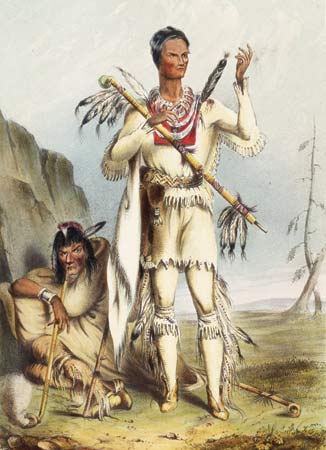
- Red Bird, dressed in white buckskin for his surrender to U.S. authorities, with Wekau
Date	June 27 – September 1, 1827
Location	Illinois and Michigan Territory
Result	United States victory
Territorial changes	Ho-Chunks cede lead mining region to the United States

Belligerents
Prairie La Crosse; Ho-Chunk; Dakota; Some others	(United States) United States; Choctaw; Métis; Some others

Commanders and leaders
Red Bird	Henry Atkinson; Henry Dodge

Casualties and losses
7 killed	9–11 civilians killed

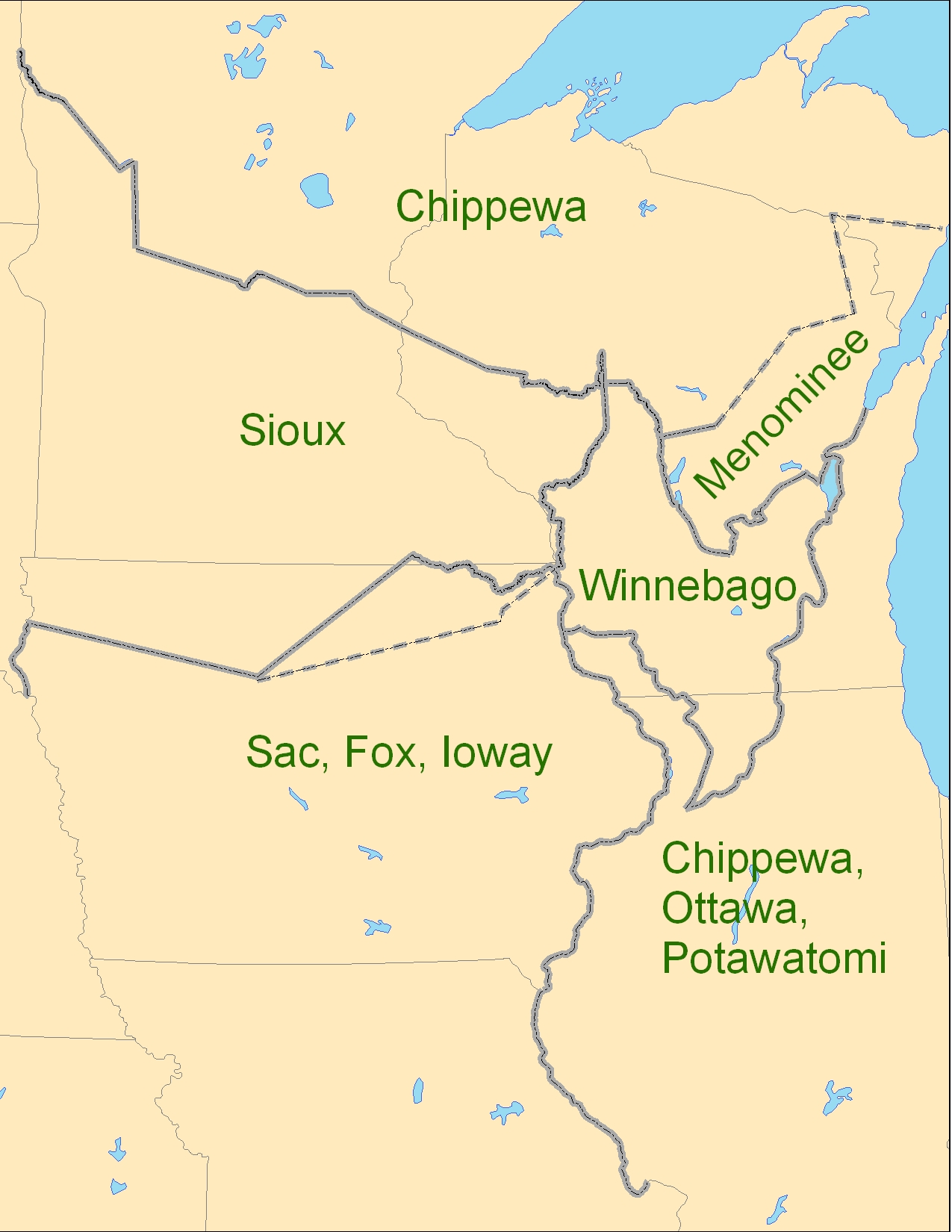
Tribal boundaries negotiated at the 1825 Prairie du Chien treaty.

The Winnebago War, also known as the Winnebago Uprising, was a brief conflict that took place in 1827 in the Upper Mississippi River region of the United States, primarily in what is now the state of Wisconsin. Not quite a war, the hostilities were limited to a few attacks on American civilians by a portion of the Winnebago or Ho-Chunk Native American tribe. The Ho-Chunks were reacting to a wave of lead miners trespassing on their lands, and to false rumors that the United States had sent two Ho-Chunk prisoners to a rival tribe for execution.

Most Native Americans in the region decided against joining the uprising, and so the conflict ended after U.S. officials responded with a show of military force. Ho-Chunk chiefs surrendered eight men who had participated in the violence, including Red Bird, whom American officials believed to be the ringleader. Red Bird died in prison in 1828 while awaiting trial; two other men convicted of murder were pardoned by President John Quincy Adams and released.

As a result of the war, the Ho-Chunk tribe was compelled to cede the lead mining region to the United States. The Americans also increased their military presence on the frontier, building Fort Winnebago and reoccupying two other abandoned forts. The conflict convinced some officials that Americans and Indians could not live peaceably together, and that the Natives should be compelled to move westward, a policy known as Indian removal. The Winnebago War preceded the larger Black Hawk War of 1832, which involved many of the same people and concerned similar issues.

== Background ==
Following the War of 1812, the United States pursued a policy of trying to prevent wars among Native Americans in the Upper Mississippi River region. This was not strictly for humanitarian reasons: intertribal warfare made it more difficult for the United States to acquire Indian land and move the tribes to the West, a policy known as Indian removal, which had become the primary goal by the late 1820s. On August 19, 1825, U.S. officials finalized a multi-tribal treaty at Prairie du Chien, which defined the boundaries of the region's tribes.

By that time, however, Americans had begun to trespass on Ho-Chunk (or Winnebago) lands in large numbers, drawn by the promise of easy lead mining along the Fever (later Galena) River. Native Americans had mined this region for thousands of years, and exporting lead had become an important part of the Ho-Chunk economy. Ho-Chunks tried to drive away the trespassers, but they often suffered abuse at the hands of aggressive miners. Some U.S. officials, concerned that Ho-Chunk mining would delay what they saw as the inevitable American possession of the mining region, worked "to dissuade the Indians from their mining plans".

=== Methode family murder ===
In March 1826, a French-Canadian man named Methode, his Native American wife, and their children were gathering maple syrup in present-day Iowa, about twelve miles north of Prairie du Chien, when they were murdered, apparently by a Ho-Chunk raiding party that had been passing through. The murderers evidently had no specific grievance with the victims, who were targets of opportunity. Two Ho-Chunk suspects were arrested by Prairie du Chien militiamen and taken to Fort Crawford. After they escaped, U.S. Army Lieutenant Colonel Willoughby Morgan seized two Ho-Chunk hostages and demanded that the Ho-Chunk tribe turn over the murderers.

On July 4, 1826, the Ho-Chunks delivered six men to Morgan at Fort Crawford. In accordance with Ho-Chunk custom, writes historian Martin Zanger, the six men were not all involved in the murders; they were surrendered to appease American anger and deflect punishment away from the tribe as a whole. The Americans, however, wanted to punish those personally responsible for the killings. Colonel Morgan was unable to determine who was guilty, and so he detained all six and demanded that the Ho-Chunk chiefs identify the killers. Colonel Josiah Snelling, commander of the 5th Infantry Regiment, reinforced the fort amid rumors that the Ho-Chunks were going to attempt to free the prisoners. Eventually, two Ho-Chunks, Wau-koo-kau (or Waukookah) and Man-ne-tah-peh-keh (or Mahnaatapakah), were turned over to the Americans and indicted for the murders.

=== Evacuation and rumors ===
The rumored Ho-Chunk attack on Fort Crawford never came, and so in October 1826, Colonel Snelling moved the garrison to Fort Snelling, where he hoped to reduce hostilities between the Dakotas (Sioux) and the Ojibwes (Chippewas). The two Ho-Chunk prisoners were also moved to Fort Snelling. In May 1827, after Dakotas attacked an Ojibwe party near Fort Snelling, Colonel Snelling arrested four of the Dakotas and turned them over to the Ojibwes, who killed them. This angered some Dakotas, who encouraged the Ho-Chunks to help them strike at the Americans, falsely telling them that the Ho-Chunk prisoners had also been turned over to the Ojibwes for execution.

The false story of the execution of the Ho-Chunk prisoners, along with the incessant American trespassing, convinced some Ho-Chunks to take up arms against the United States. The timing seemed right, since the evacuation of Fort Crawford appeared to be a sign of American weakness. Another grievance was the news that some Ho-Chunk women had been sexually assaulted by American riverboat crews along the Mississippi River, although this story, like the one about the executions, may have been a false rumor. The Ho-Chunks broke off diplomatic relations with the United States by not showing up for a scheduled treaty conference, and prepared for war.

== Hostilities ==
In late June 1827, a Ho-Chunk leader named Red Bird, along with Wekau (or Wa-ni-ga, The Sun) and Chickhonsic (or Chic-hong-sic, Little Buffalo), went to Prairie du Chien to seek revenge for what they believed were the executions of the Ho-Chunk prisoners. Unable to locate their intended victim, they instead targeted the cabin of Registre Gagnier, the son of an esteemed African-American nurse and midwife named Aunt Mary Ann. Gagnier welcomed the three Ho-Chunks into his home for a meal. What happened inside varies according to sources. According to one account, Red Bird shot and killed Gagnier, while Chickhonsic shot and killed Solomon Lipcap, a hired man or friend of the family. Wekau tried to shoot Gagnier's wife, but she wrestled his gun away before escaping with her young son. Wekau had to settle for stabbing and scalping Gagnier's infant daughter, who survived the attack. Another account says that only Red Bird committed the murders. Red Bird and his companions returned with the three scalps to their village at Prairie La Crosse, where a celebration was held.

On June 30, 1827, the Prairie La Crosse Ho-Chunks struck again. About 150 Ho-Chunks, with a few Dakota allies, attacked two American keelboats on the Mississippi, near the mouth of the Bad Axe River. Two Americans were killed and four were wounded in the skirmish; about seven Ho-Chunks died in the attack or later from their wounds. According to historian Patrick Jung, "The attack, while relatively small, was significant because it was the first act of war committed against the United States by Indians in the region since the War of 1812."

In their nascent war against the Americans, the Prairie La Crosse Ho-Chunks sought to recruit allies among the Dakotas, Potawatomis, and other Ho-Chunk bands. Most leaders of these tribes, while sympathetic to Ho-Chunk grievances, urged neutrality. Some Potawatomis participated by killing some American livestock, but Potawatomi leaders Billy Caldwell, Alexander Robinson, and Shaubena rode among the Potawatomi settlements and urged people to stay out of the war; they would do the same five years later during the Black Hawk War. Many Ho-Chunks also distanced themselves from the actions of Red Bird and the Prairie La Crosse Ho-Chunks. Without allies, the effort to ignite a widespread war was doomed. By mid-July, writes historian Martin Zanger, "for all practical purposes the 'Red Bird Uprising' was over".

== American response ==
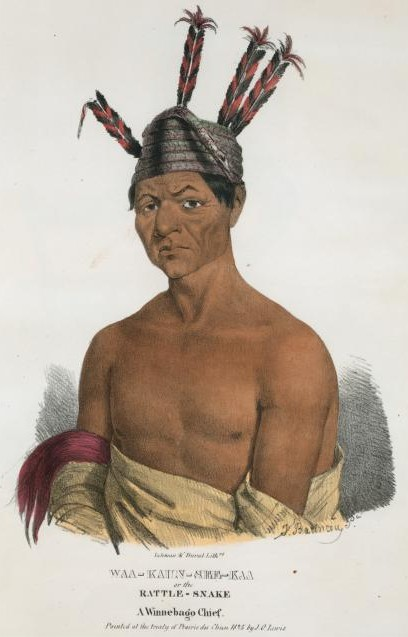
An 1825 portrait Waukon Decorah, one of the Ho-Chunk chiefs who surrendered Red Bird to the Americans.

The attacks created panic among the American population of the area. Settlers, fearing the outbreak of a wider Indian war, fled to towns such as Galena and Chicago, or sought sanctuary in the abandoned Fort Crawford.

Lewis Cass, the governor of Michigan Territory, and Thomas McKenney, the Superintendent of Indian Affairs, were hosting a treaty conference near Green Bay when they learned of the attacks. To discourage the spread of the uprising, Cass promptly invited Native Americans in the region to come to the treaty grounds to receive gifts and food; more than 2,000 people eventually arrived. McKenney warned the Ho-Chunk chiefs in attendance that the only way to avoid an American military invasion of their homeland was to surrender those responsible for the attacks. Other American officials met with other native leaders, including Keokuk and Wabokieshiek, and urged them to stay out of the war.

Meanwhile, American officials scrambled to mobilize troops. Cass hurried to Prairie du Chien, where he organized the local militia. Colonel Snelling arrived at Prairie du Chien on July 10, bringing about 200 regulars from Fort Snelling to reoccupy Fort Crawford. He was joined there on July 29 by Brigadier General Henry Atkinson, who brought 500 men upriver by steamboat from Jefferson Barracks. Several days later, Henry Dodge arrived at Fort Crawford with 130 mounted militiamen, mostly miners. Governor Ninian Edwards of Illinois sent 600 mounted militiamen north to Wisconsin.

To the east, McKenney and Major William Whistler organized another force. Whistler had about 100 regulars from Fort Howard, along with 50 mostly métis militiamen from Green Bay, 60 New York Indians, and 120 Menominees. On August 29, Atkinson's force began moving up the Wisconsin River towards Portage, Wisconsin, where the hostile Ho-Chunks had concentrated, while Whistler's force converged on the same location from the north.

On September 1, 1827, McKenney and Whistler's force arrived at the Portage. On September 3, two Ho-Chunk leaders, Waukon Decorah and Carymaunee, surrendered Red Bird and Wekau to the Americans. Carymaunee asked the Americans not to put irons on Red Bird and Wekau; this request was granted. He then offered to give the Americans twenty horses in exchange for the prisoners, but this was declined. The Ho-Chunks turned in four more men involved in the uprising in the following weeks.

== Aftermath ==
In diplomatic talks with the Ho-Chunks at the close of the war, General Atkinson promised that the U.S. government would look into their grievances in the lead mining region. Thomas McKenney requested military aid to evict American miners who were trespassing on Ho-Chunk land, but after the war, settlers poured into the region in unprecedented numbers, and U.S. officials proved to be unable or unwilling to stem the tide. By January 1828, there were as many as 10,000 illegal settlers on Ho-Chunk land, including militia general Henry Dodge, who established a mining camp after the war and boasted that the U.S. Army could not make him leave. Having no other options, on August 25, 1828, the Ho-Chunks signed a provisional treaty with the United States, agreeing to sell the land occupied by the miners in a more formal treaty to be held later.

Eight Ho-Chunks were detained by the U.S. government at Fort Crawford for trial after the war. American officials most wanted to convict Red Bird, believing that he had been the leader of the uprising. This belief, according to historian Martin Zanger, was based on an American failure to understand the decentralized nature of Ho-Chunk society. "Because Red Bird was well known to the white frontiersmen," writes Zanger, "they focused their resentment on him, mistakenly attributing to him a leadership role he did not deserve." Red Bird was never tried; he contracted dysentery and died in prison on February 16, 1828, before his trial got underway.

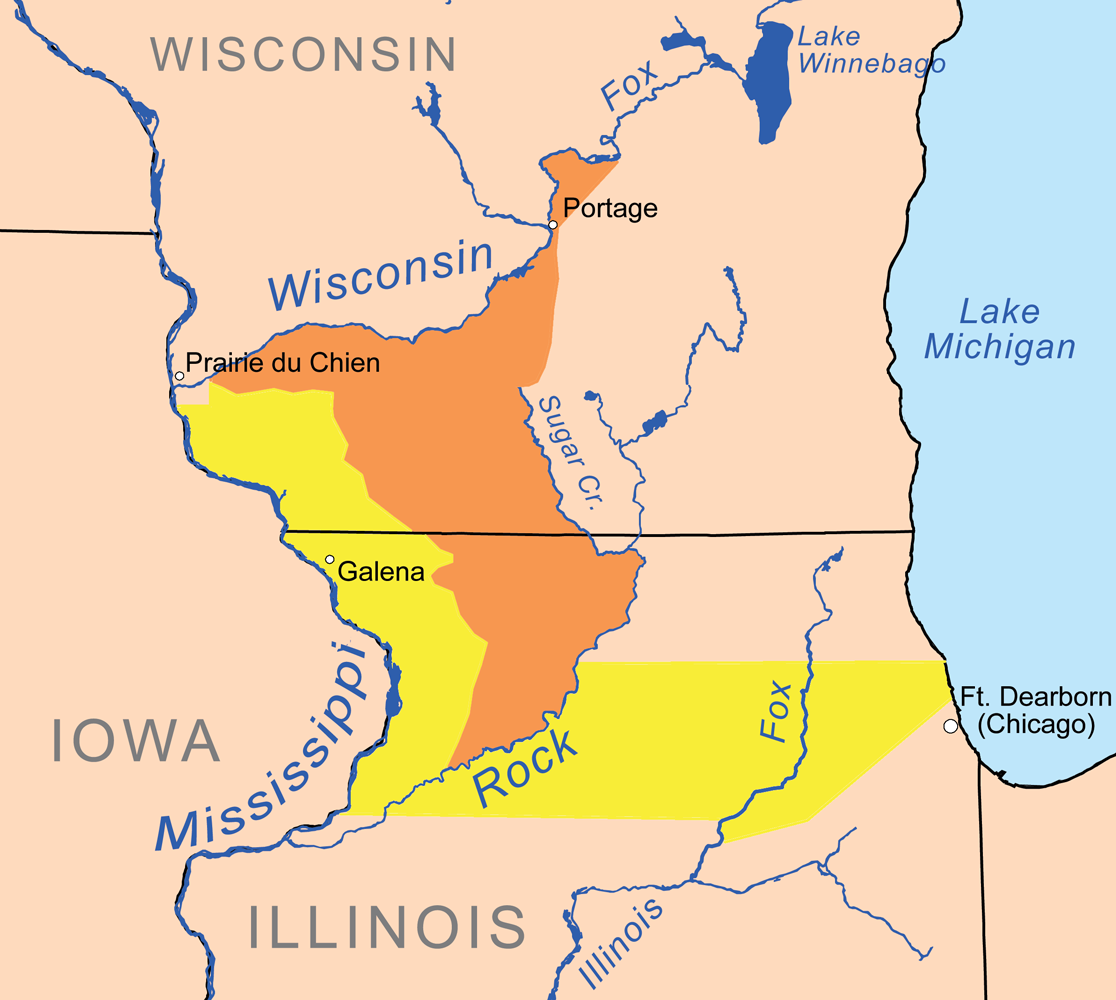
Land ceded to the U.S. at Prairie du Chien in 1829 by the Three Fires Confederacy (in yellow) and the Ho-Chunk tribe (in orange).

The trials were delayed due to the difficulties in bringing together witnesses, prosecutors, defense attorneys, and interpreters. The proceedings finally began in August 1828, with Judge James Duane Doty presiding. Wau-koo-kau and Man-ne-tah-peh-keh, the two warriors imprisoned for the 1826 murders of the Methode family, were released due to a lack of witnesses, as were three Ho-Chunks held for the attack on the keelboats. Only two men, Wekau and Chickhonsic, were prosecuted. According to historian Patrick Jung, it became clear during the trial that Red Bird had committed the murders at the Gagnier cabin, and that there was not enough evidence to convict Wekau and Chickhonsic. Despite this, the white and métis jury found them guilty. Judge Doty sentenced them to hang, as he was required to do by law. Their lawyer filed a motion for a new trial, arguing that the jury had ignored the evidence, and so Doty suspended the death sentences.

On November 3, 1828, President John Quincy Adams, having been told that the executions would likely spark another uprising, pardoned the prisoners in exchange for a land cession. In July and August 1829, in treaties signed at Prairie du Chien, the Three Fires Confederacy and the Ho-Chunks formally ceded the lead mining region to the United States for annual payments of $16,000 and $18,000 respectively.

Hoping to prevent further uprisings, the United States decided to strengthen its military presence in the region after the Winnebago War. Fort Crawford was reoccupied, as was Fort Dearborn in Chicago, which had been abandoned in 1823. A new outpost, Fort Winnebago, was built in October 1828 at the portage between the Fox and Wisconsin Rivers.

The conflict also helped to promote a change in U.S. policy regarding Native Americans. Previously, many Americans had argued that Indians should be "civilized" and assimilated into white American society. But for some, the Winnebago War discredited the idea that Indians and Americans could live peaceably together. In his State of the Union Address of December 2, 1828, outgoing President Adams announced that the "civilization" policy had been a failure, and that Indian removal—moving the tribes to the West—was the policy of the future. That policy would be taken up by Adams's successor, Andrew Jackson.

== See also ==
- American Indian Wars
- Black Hawk War
- History of Wisconsin
- List of conflicts in the United States
