= 1837 Ho-Chunk treaty =

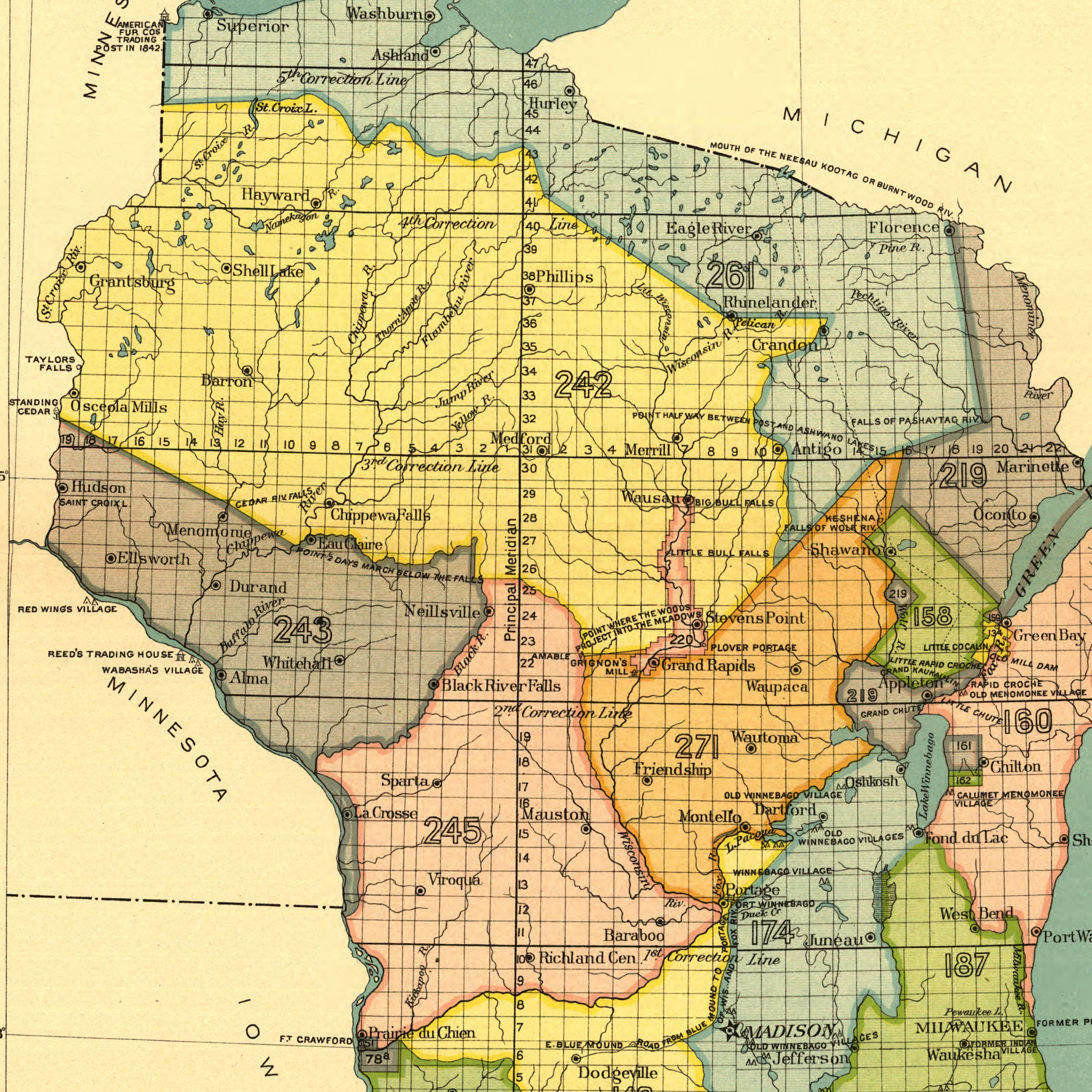
Map of present-day Wisconsin, which shows Ho-Chunk land (245) ceded to the U.S. Government in the 1837 Treaty.

On November 1,1837, the Ho-Chunk and U.S. Government signed a treaty that ceded the rest of Ho-Chunk land in Wisconsin. The "White drive and demand for land... led to the Treaty of 1837." The Treaty ceded the rest of Ho-Chunk land east of the Mississippi River and required the whole tribe to move to "Neutral Ground" west of the Mississippi. The Neutral Ground was in "between the territories of rival Sauk and Dakota peoples embracing much of today's northeastern Iowa and adjacent parts of Minnesota." The Ho-Chunk had to leave Wisconsin within eight months. In the treaty, the U.S. Government promised that the Ho-Chunk would receive an annual payment of $55,000 in goods, provisions, and cash for twenty-two years following, 1859.

The 1837 treaty has "remained a persistent point of anger among the Ho-Chunk people" due to the fraudulence and coercion that was involved. When the Ho-Chunk delegates went to Washington, "they were threatened, bullied, and refused passage home until they signed a treaty giving up their remaining Wisconsin lands." Also, The Ho-Chunk thought they would have eight years to move off of their land, but it actually said eight months. The interpreter for the Ho-Chunk during the negotiations "later admitted that he was directed to deceive the Indians." Despite governmental action, many Ho-Chunk people either remained or continued to return to Wisconsin following the 1837 treaty.

== Background ==
=== 1832 treaty ===
In the 1832 Treaty, signed after the 1830 Indian Removal Act, over half of Ho-Chunk land was ceded, "including the watersheds of the Rock and Fox Rivers, and the lakes, rivers, wetlands, and hills of Teejop, the Four Lakes,” present day Madison area. The treaty required them to either move north to the “less fertile lands north of the Wisconsin River,” or to the western banks of the Mississippi River, known as the "Neutral Ground". The Neutral Ground was in "between the territories of rival Sauk and Dakota peoples embracing much of today's northeastern Iowa and adjacent parts of Minnesota."

=== 1832 treaty aftermath ===
There were multiple complications following the 1832 Treaty with the Ho-Chunk. White settlers continued to move onto both ceded and unceded land. The Black Hawk War, just a year prior, "had given many men a chance to look at new areas of what would be Wisconsin and many liked what they saw and returned or stayed." With the increased presence of settlers came the increased demand for lumber for things such as houses, fuel, and fencing.The lands north and west of the Wisconsin River were abundant in pine, however, the Ho-Chunk still owned that land.

Following the treaty, many Ho-Chunk people did leave the ceded land and went to their land north of the Wisconsin River, "under white pressure". According to a letter from Lewis Cass, the Secretary of War, to Martin Van Buren, most of the Ho-Chunk had returned to the ceded land. Regarding why many returned, Cass stated "I have always understood that their country, north of the Ouisconsin, is a sterile, barren, region, almost destitute of game, and very unfavourable to any products raised by the Indians."

== Trip to Washington D.C. ==
In September of 1837, Ho-Chunk agent Thomas A.B. Boyd invited chiefs at Fort Winnebago to go to Washington D.C. with him. Boyd told the chiefs that the reason for the trip was “for no other motive than their welfare.” Some Ho-Chunks resisted, including Roaring Thunder (also referred to as Dandy), a prominent Ho-Chunk chief and orator. Roaring Thunder opposed the trip and told Boyd that “the chiefs did not want to talk about going to Washington until they had received their annuity payment.” The annuity payment he was referring to was promised in the Treaty of 1832. Roaring Thunder refused to go on the trip. Not all Ho-Chunk leaders could refuse to go as "the government's control over the nature, timing, and location of annuity distribution gave it substantial coercive power." Ho-Chunk "who did send representatives tried to forestall disaster by assembling a delegation whose members who mostly not Bear clan, the division of the nation responsible for land.”

When the Ho-Chunk delegation arrived in Washington, "they were threatened, bullied, and refused passage home until they signed a treaty giving up their remaining Wisconsin lands." According to Roaring Thunder, the agent would not tell the delegates the terms of the treaty, "for fear they would object." He also threatened that "if they did not sign the treaty he would put them into a house or on board of a boat, and kill them." The Ho-Chunk had understood that they would have eight years to move off of their land, but they only had eight months.

== Treaty terms ==
The treaty meeting was on November 1, 1837, and the proclamation of the treaty occurred on June 15, 1838. Below is a summary of the six articles in the 1837 Treaty

=== Article 1 ===
The Ho-Chunk Nation cedes to the United States all of their land east of the Mississippi River.

=== Article 2 ===
The Ho-Chunk give up their rights to occupy the ceded land.

=== Article 3 ===
The Ho-Chunk will move within eight months to the neutral ground west of the Mississippi River.

=== Article 4 ===
Terms of the payment. The U.S. Government put $1.1 million in trust, with the Ho-Chunk getting annual annuity payments of approximately $55,000, the equivalence of roughly $1,856,112 in 2025. That money had to first pay to help schools, medical services, agricultural teachers, and a grist mill.The remaining money was to be given to the Ho-Chunk, but they could only receive $20,000 of it in cash. The rest of the money were to be paid in the form of food and goods, for a 22-year period. The remaining $400,000 was set aside for outstanding debts with non-Natives, such as traders.

The debt paid back "most likely exceeded actual debts due to fraudulent claims by traders and merchants."

=== Article 5 ===
Previous services, goods, and payments promised in previous treaties will now be voided.

=== Article 6 ===
The treaty is binding once ratified.

== Aftermath ==
When the Ho-Chunk delegates returned from Washington, they protested the treatment they received during their journey. Henry Dodge, the territorial governor of Wisconsin dismissed their claims of fraud and coercion. Regarding the Ho-Chunk only getting eight months to leave Wisconsin, Dodge stated that they "had been informed that the treaty required them to leave in eight months." One Ho-Chunk delegate stated that if the Ho-Chunk were told this, "it was in English and not in Indian." Also, the interpreter who was present at the negotiations "later admitted that he was directed to deceive the Indians."

The government attempted to remove the Ho-Chunk multiple times, but due to the claims of fraudulence, many Ho-Chunk people either remained or kept returning to their home in Wisconsin.Those who stayed in Wisconsin, "were essentially Indians without a tribe, and for this reason they were forced in the 1870s and 1889s to take 40-acre homesteads like White settlers so they could remain." The Treaty of 1837 has "remained a persistent point of anger among the Ho-Chunk people."
