= Waukon Decorah =

19th-century Ho-Chunk leader

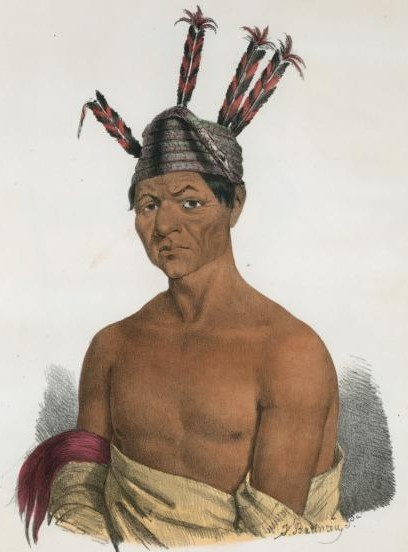
Portrait by James Otto Lewis, painted at the 1825 First Treaty of Prairie du Chien conference.

Waukon Decorah (c. 1780–1868), also known as Wakąhaga (Wau-kon-haw-kaw) or "Snake-Skin", was a prominent Ho-Chunk (Winnebago) warrior and orator during the Winnebago War of 1827 and the Black Hawk War of 1832. Although not a hereditary chief, he emerged as a diplomatic leader in Ho-Chunk relations with the United States.

== Family and early life ==
Waukon Decorah came from a prominent Ho-Chunk family in what is now the U.S. state of Wisconsin. He was the son of Buzzard Decorah, who was in turn the son of a Ho-Chunk chieftess named Glory of the Morning and a French trader named Sabrevoir De Carrie. Waukon Decorah's brother was known as Big Canoe or One-Eyed Decorah (c. 1772–1864). Early historical accounts sometimes confused the brothers with each other, or with their uncle Spoon Decorah (c. 1730–c.1816) or with their cousin Old Decorah (c. 1746–1836) and Old Decorah's sons Little Decorah (1797–1887) and Spoon Decorah (c. 1805–1889).

Some early histories state that Waukon Decorah was also known by the nickname "Washington Decorah", because he had visited Washington, D.C., in the 1820s. However, in June 1832, Indian agent Joseph M. Street wrote in a letter that he had met with Waukon Decorah and his brothers One-Eyed Decorah and Washington Decorah, implying that Washington and Waukon were two different men. According to historian Ellen M. Whitney, it is not clear which member of the Decorah family was called "Washington". Waukon Decorah and One-Eyed Decorah had an older brother named Mau-wah-re-gah, who became an outcast after killing their father in a drunken brawl.

== Black Hawk War ==
In 1829, Waukon Decorah's daughter, who had married a Dakota man, was killed in Iowa by Sauk and Meskwaki raiders, part of ongoing hostilities between the Dakotas and the Sauks and Meskwakis. Decorah wanted to mount a retaliatory raid against the Sauks and Meskwakis, but he was discouraged from doing this by United States officials, who were trying to negotiate an end to the hostilities.

When the Black Hawk War erupted in 1832, Decorah eagerly joined the American war against Black Hawk's band of Sauks and Meskwakis, hoping to finally avenge his daughter's death. Although some Ho-Chunks were sympathetic to Black Hawk's efforts to resist American expansion, Decorah was able to recruit warriors from his followers on the Wisconsin River, and was joined by One-Eyed Decorah and his followers from Prairie la Crosse. After the war, on November 5, 1834, Meskwaki raiders killed ten women and children from Decorah's family, including his wife. Decorah believed that the attack was meant as retaliation for his role in the Black Hawk War.

== Later life and legacy ==
In 1837, Decorah was part of a Ho-Chunk delegation that went to Washington, D.C. to seek redress for American encroachment on their land. Even though the delegates had been U.S. allies during the Black Hawk War, they were pressured to sign a removal treaty ceding all Ho-Chunk land west of the Mississippi River to the United States. Decorah signed this treaty as "Wa-kaun-ha-kah (Snake Skin)". The delegates thought that the treaty gave the Ho-Chunks eight years to leave Wisconsin, which would leave them time to negotiate a new treaty, but the wording on the document gave the tribe eight months to vacate Wisconsin and resettle on reservations in Iowa and Minnesota. Ho-Chunks who refused to leave were rounded up by General Henry Atkinson and escorted west, though many later returned.

Decorah's family moved across the Mississippi River into the "Neutral Ground" of northeast Iowa. Later he moved to Long Prairie, Minnesota, and by 1855 he was living in Blue Earth County, Minnesota. Some older histories state that Decorah died in Minnesota at the Blue Earth Indian Agency, but he evidently returned to Wisconsin in the last years of his life. In 1868, the Mauston Star of Mauston, Wisconsin, reported that he died on July 18 while living next to the Lemonweir River near Mauston.

Two Iowa cities, Decorah and Waukon, are often said to be named for him, although Waukon is also said to be named for his son Chief John Waukon. There are other place names, such as Dekorra, Wisconsin, and Decoria Township, Blue Earth County, Minnesota, that are named for his relatives. In 1859, citizens of Decorah, Iowa, exhumed the remains said to be of "Chief Decorah", believed to be the man for whom the city was named, to make way for the city's expansion. The body was re-interred on the grounds of the county courthouse. However, as was rumored at the time, Waukon Decorah was still living in 1859; it is unclear who was actually buried there. The remains of the unknown Native American were exhumed again in 1876 during court house renovations; some of the relics buried with the body were stolen before the remains were re-interred.

Waukon Decorah's son John Waukon is buried in Oakland Cemetery in Waukon. A new headstone was placed at the grave in November 2007.
