= John Raymond Rice =

United States Army soldier

John Raymond Rice (Walking in Blue Sky)
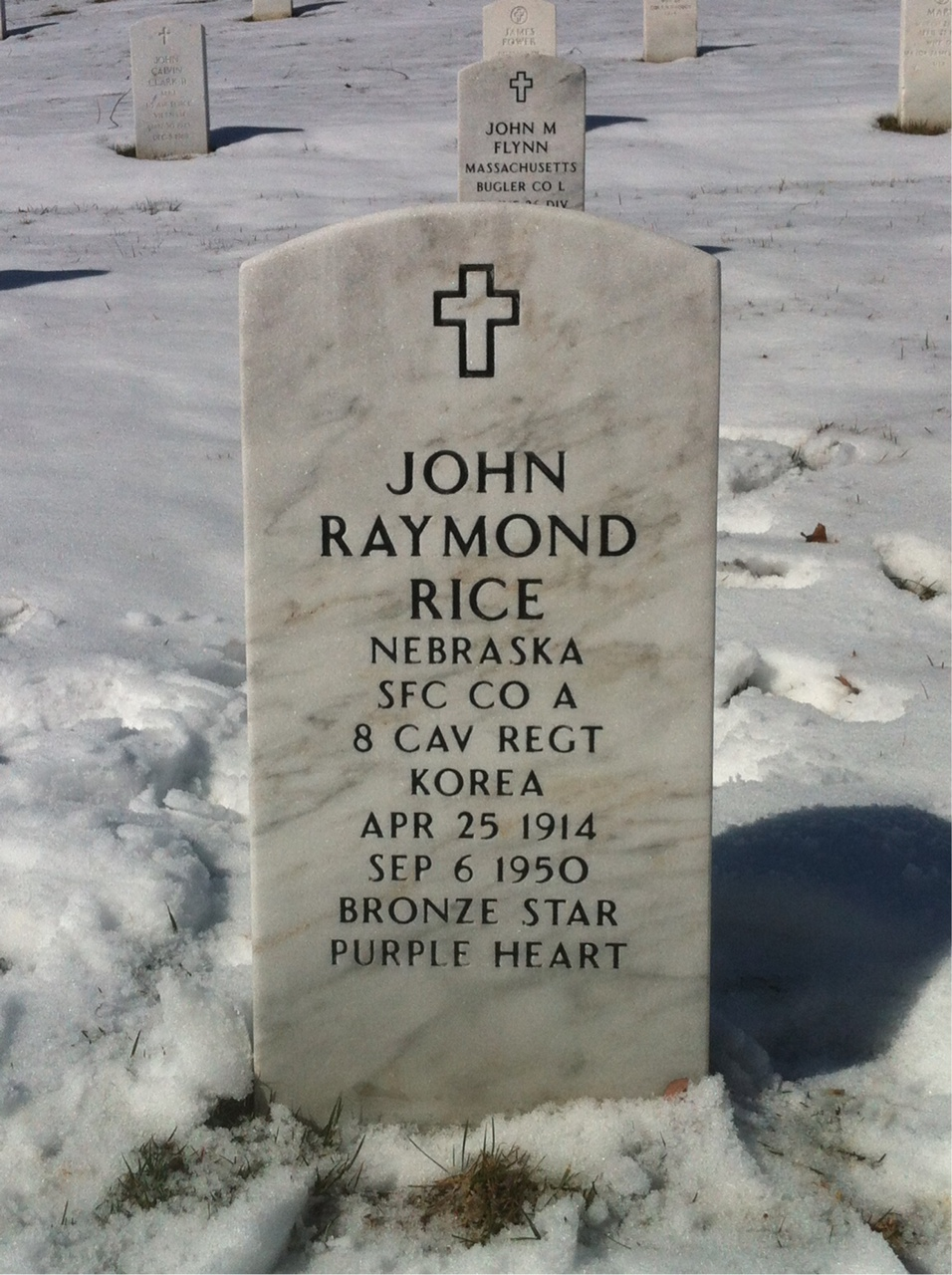
- Grave at Arlington National Cemetery
- Born: April 25, 1914; Winnebago, Nebraska, US
- Died: September 6, 1950 (aged 36); Tabu-Dong, Korea
- Burial place: Arlington National Cemetery
- Military career
- Allegiance: United States
- Branch: United States Marine Corps; United States Army
- Rank: Sergeant First Class
- Service number: 17033372
- Units: Company A, 8th Cavalry Regiment, United States Army
- Conflicts: Battle of Tabu-Dong
- Awards: Bronze Star, Purple Heart
- Known for: Sioux City Memorial Park Cemetery refusing to bury his body because he was Native American

Sergeant First Class John Raymond Rice (Native American name: Walking in Blue Sky) (April 25, 1914 – September 6, 1950) was a Ho Chunk (Winnebago) Indian and a United States Army soldier killed in action while leading his squad in Korea in 1950. A Sioux City, Iowa cemetery refused to bury his body because he was Native American, touching off a national episode culminating in President Harry Truman ordering his body to be interred in Arlington National Cemetery.

== Biography ==
A tribal member of the Ho-Chunk Nation, also known as the Winnebago Indian Tribe, Rice was born in Winnebago, Nebraska, and had previously served in the United States Marine Corps during World War II. During World War II Rice was awarded the Bronze Star for heroism during the New Guinea campaign. In the Korean War he was killed leading a squad of Company A, 8th Cavalry Regiment, during the Battle of Tabu-dong "one of the most critical and heroic stands made by the hard-pressed United Nations forces."

When Rice's body arrived in Sioux City, fellow veteran Sam Tebo Sr. performed a traditional Ho-Chunk mourning ritual, sitting by Rice's body for four days and nights without sleep.

During his funeral on August 28, 1951—at the Memorial Park Cemetery in Sioux City, Iowa—a cemetery employee noticed there were Native Americans among the mourners. After the military burial service, including the ceremonial three-volley salute, cemetery officials discovered that Rice himself was Native American. They stopped the actual burial, and made his non-Indian wife Evelyn take his body away. Prior to making burial arrangements at Memorial Park Cemetery, the widow had already been denied the burial of Rice at the city-owned cemeteries because of his race.

According to cemetery officials, "private cemeteries have always had a right to be operated for a particular group such as Jewish, Catholic, Lutheran, Negro, Chinese, etc., not because of any prejudice against any race, but because people, like animals, prefer to be with their own kind."

The following day, August 29, then-President Harry Truman publicly reprimanded the cemetery and the Sioux City town leaders. Rice's wife was given a plot in Arlington National Cemetery. The press and local groups in Sioux City also lambasted the Sioux City cemetery.

Sergeant Rice was buried on September 5, 1951, nearly a year to the day after he died, in Arlington National Cemetery.

In 2001, Rice was honored at a ceremony in Sioux City, at which his widow Evelyn participated. The Rices had several children and grandchildren.

Evelyn Rice died on January 26, 2006, and was buried alongside her husband at Arlington.
