= Sam Blowsnake =

Winnebago Indian (born 1875)

Sam Blowsnake (a.k.a., Crashing Thunder, Big Winnebego; born 1875) was a Winnebago Indian best known as the attributed author of the autobiography Crashing Thunder: The Autobiography of an American Indian.

== Life ==
Blowsnake was born in Black River Falls, Wisconsin in 1875 to a father of the Thunder clan and a mother, named Bends the Boughs, of the Eagle Clan; his parents were later known in English as Charles Blowsnake and Lucy Goodvillage. Sam Blowsnake was their fifth child.

Early in life, he was initiated into ceremonial dance practice. He performed in Wild West shows, and was imprisoned for some time for his role in the murder of a Potawatomi man. After a long period of spiritual dissatisfaction, Blowsnake converted into the Peyote Religion (or Native American Church); following his conversion, he was baptised, married, and had a child.

The date of Blowsnake's death is unknown, but he was still alive in 1958, when his sister's autobiography was published.

== Autobiography ==
The earliest form of the narrative which would become Crashing Thunder was published in 1913, as part of Paul Radin's comprehensive study of Winnebago native society, The Winnebego Tribe. Blowsnake is referenced in this work only as S.B., and his brother, Jim Blowsnake, is also given the name Crashing Thunder. In 1920, Radin published "The Autobiography of an American Indian" as an article in the University of California Publications in American Archaeology and Ethnology, which was a substantially different text covering the same events, once again identifying its subject only as S.B. In 1922, Radin wrote a chapter for Elsie Clews Parson's book American Indian Life, entitled "Thunder-Cloud, a Winnebego Shaman, Relates and Prays" - although the book was advertised as a collection of fictional narratives written by anthropologists, Radin's contribution was mostly a composite of two chapters from The Winnebego Tribe, one of them that concerning Sam Blowsnake.

Finally, in 1926, Radin published Crashing Thunder: The Autobiography of an American Indian. In this work, as in all his previous works concerning Blowsnake with the exception of the chapter in American Indian Life, Radin insisted that he had not influenced Blowsnake's telling in any way. However, Radin notes in the preface to Crashing Thunder that Blowsnake was reluctant to tell his autobiography at all, and that it was only at Radin's insistence that he did so. Furthermore, in his reworking of the 92-page "The Autobiography of an American Indian" into the 203-page Crashing Thunder, Radin silently rephrased, re-arrangeed, and in some cases, added to the narrative attributed to Blowsnake in the earlier work. There has therefore been extensive debate as to whether Crashing Thunder should be read primarily as an autobiography written by Blowsnake which Radin merely edited, or as an original creation of Radin's merely inspired by Blowsnake's life. In any case, there is consensus that Radin's claims to scientific objectivity in the work are contradicted by his methods.
