= Winnebago, Nebraska =

Village in Thurston County, Nebraska, United States

Winnebago Nįšoc (Ho-Chunk)
- Village
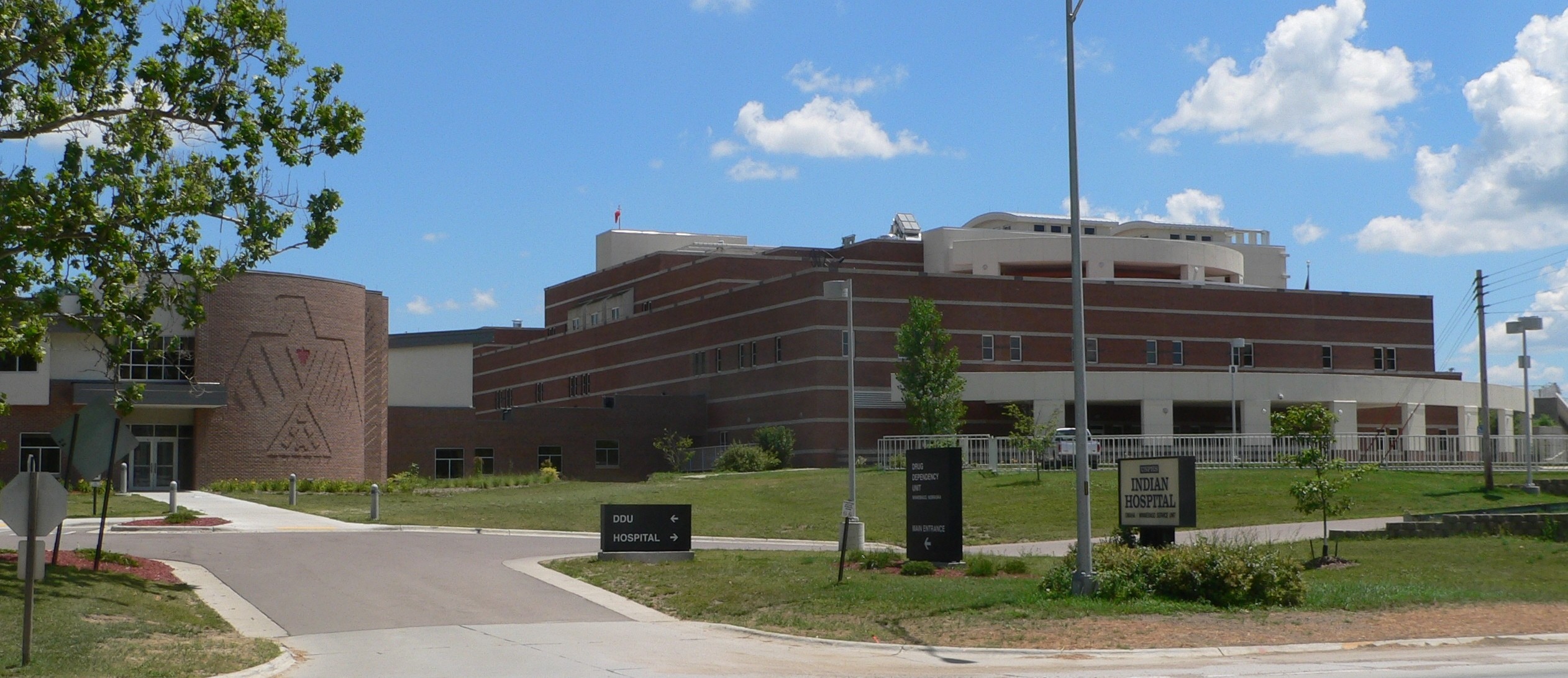
- Indian Health Service hospital in Winnebago, July 2010

- Location of Winnebago, Nebraska

- Location within Nebraska Location within the United States
- Coordinates: 42°14′18″N 96°28′17″W
- Country: United States
- State: Nebraska
- County: Thurston
- Township: Winnebago

Area
  - Total: 0.32 sq mi (0.83 km^{2})
  - Land: 0.32 sq mi (0.83 km^{2})
  - Water: 0 sq mi (0.00 km^{2})
- Elevation: 1,224 ft (373 m)

Population (2020)
  - Total: 916
  - Density: 2,850.4/sq mi (1,100.54/km^{2})
- Time zone: UTC-6 (Central (CST))
  - Summer (DST): UTC-5 (CDT)
- ZIP code: 68071
- Area code: 402
- FIPS code: 31-53275
- GNIS feature ID: 2399717

Winnebago is a village in Thurston County, Nebraska, United States. The population was 916 at the 2020 census. The village is known as Nįšoc in the Hoocąk language.

== History ==
The first post office at Winnebago was established in 1867, within the Winnebago Reservation established primarily in Thurston County, Nebraska. Both were named for the federally recognized Winnebago tribe, whose name for themselves (autonym) in their own language is transliterated as Ho-Chunk. They were forced by a US treaty to relocate here in 1868 from Minnesota.

== Geography ==
Winnebago is located within the Winnebago Reservation of the Ho-Chunk, in the northeast part of Nebraska. According to the United States Census Bureau, the village has a total area of 0.32 square miles (0.83 km^{2}), all land.

== Demographics ==
Historical population
Census	Pop.	Note	%±
1910	399		—
1920	648		62.4%
1930	653		0.8%
1940	800		22.5%
1950	684		−14.5%
1960	682		−0.3%
1970	675		−1.0%
1980	902		33.6%
1990	705		−21.8%
2000	768		8.9%
2010	774		0.8%
2020	916		18.3%
U.S. Decennial Census

=== 2020 census ===
As of the census of 2020, the population was 916. The population density was 2,853.6 inhabitants per square mile (1,101.8/km^{2}). There were 309 housing units at an average density of 962.6 per square mile (371.7/km^{2}). The racial makeup of the village was 92.8% Native American, 3.5% White, 0.1% Pacific Islander, 1.2% from other races, and 2.4% from two or more races. Ethnically, the population was 4.6% Hispanic or Latino of any race.

=== 2010 census ===
As of the census of 2010, there were 774 people, 200 households, and 151 families living in the village. The population density was 3,870.0 inhabitants per square mile (1,494.2/km^{2}). There were 227 housing units at an average density of 1,135.0 per square mile (438.2/km^{2}). The racial makeup of the village was 4.4% White, 0.1% African American, 90.6% Native American, 0.1% from other races, and 4.8% from two or more races. Hispanic or Latino of any race were 4.0% of the population.

There were 200 households, of which 62.0% had children under the age of 18 living with them, 24.0% were married couples living together, 36.5% had a female householder with no husband present, 15.0% had a male householder with no wife present, and 24.5% were non-families. 23.0% of all households were made up of individuals, and 11.5% had someone living alone who was 65 years of age or older. The average household size was 3.84 and the average family size was 4.51.

The median age in the village was 21.4 years. 43.5% of residents were under the age of 18; 10.9% were between the ages of 18 and 24; 20.4% were from 25 to 44; 17.8% were from 45 to 64; and 7.4% were 65 years of age or older. The gender makeup of the village was 48.3% male and 51.7% female.

=== 2000 census ===
As of the census of 2000, there were 768 people, 211 households, and 166 families living in the village. The population density was 2,704.4 inhabitants per square mile (1,044.2/km^{2}). There were 233 housing units at an average density of 820.5 per square mile (316.8/km^{2}). The racial makeup of the village was 5.47% White, 0.13% African American, 91.93% Native American, 1.95% from other races, and 0.52% from two or more races. Hispanic or Latino of any race were 2.73% of the population.

There were 211 households, out of which 50.7% had children under the age of 18 living with them, 30.8% were married couples living together, 38.9% had a female householder with no husband present, and 20.9% were non-families. 19.0% of all households were made up of individuals, and 10.0% had someone living alone who was 65 years of age or older. The average household size was 3.58 and the average family size was 4.01.

In the village, the population was spread out, with 42.7% under the age of 18, 8.7% from 18 to 24, 28.0% from 25 to 44, 14.1% from 45 to 64, and 6.5% who were 65 years of age or older. The median age was 23 years. For every 100 females, there were 99.0 males. For every 100 females age 18 and over, there were 78.9 males.

As of 2000 the median income for a household in the village was $20,795, and the median income for a family was $21,818. Males had a median income of $18,958 versus $19,643 for females. The per capita income for the village was $6,317. About 43.7% of families and 48.6% of the population were below the poverty line, including 55.6% of those under age 18 and 33.3% of those age 65 or over.

== Notable people ==
- Julius Drum (1958-2007) - Ho-Chunk actor who acted in Thunderheart
- John Raymond Rice (1914-1950) - Ho-Chunk US Army veteran, a casualty of the Korean War; .
- Lillian St. Cyr (1884-1974) - Winnebago (Ho-Chunk) actress prominent in the silent film era; known as star of The Squaw Man

== See also ==
- List of municipalities in Nebraska
