= Blue Earth Reservation =

Indian reservation in Minnesota, 1855–1863

The Blue Earth Reservation for the Ho-Chunk nation existed from 1855 to 1863. It was originally created through a treaty ratified on March 23, 1855, which dissolved the previous Ho-Chunk "Long Prairie" reservation in the Minnesota Territory and created a new 18-square-mile (47 km^{2}) reservation along the Blue Earth River, three miles south of present-day Mankato, Minnesota. Following the Dakota War of 1862, this reservation was eliminated by the U.S. and the Ho-Chunk people were forcibly removed to a new reservation at Crow Creek, South Dakota. Later, the U.S. moved the Ho-Chunk again to their current reservation in Nebraska. There are two federally recognized Ho-Chunk tribes, the Winnebago Tribe of Nebraska and the Ho-Chunk Nation of Wisconsin.

== History ==
Blue Earth Reservation created by the Treaty between the United States and the Winnebago Indians,1855.

The United States obtained land in central Minnesota in 1847 from the Ojibwe nations residing there for the purpose of resettling the Ho-Chunk (Winnebago) from their reservation previously created by the Treaty of 1832. With this new land, commonly referred to as "Long Prairie", secured from the Ojibwe, the U.S. signed a treaty with the Ho-Chunk transferring "Long Prairie" to the Ho-Chunk.

The main goal of moving the Ho-Chunk to this new reservation called "Long Prairie" was to create a buffer zone between the Minnesota Ojibwe and Dakota nations and to open the southeastern tip of Minnesota for U.S. settlement. Settlers had been illegally moving onto this land, making claims, engaging in clear cutting, and selling whiskey despite the fact that treaty rights had forbid all of these activities. The new "Long Prairie" reservation land was chosen by U.S. treaty representatives Henry Mower Rice, Alexander Ramsey, and Henry Sibley so these individuals could be the exclusive provider of goods promised through treaty and the closest businesses to the reservation for natives to spend their annuity monies. Upon arriving at Long Prairie, the Ho-Chunk became frustrated with the quality of the land. U.S. treaty representatives promised that the Long Prairie reservation would be great for farming. In reality, the land was filled with swamp and timber and not suitable for agriculture. Shortly after arriving on the reservation, many Ho-Chunk began advocating for a new reservation. During this same time, Henry Mower Rice realized there was more money in the reservation's timber than in the annuities brought by the Ho-Chunk. Rice partnered with the Ho-Chunk to find them a new reservation.

The search for a new reservation ended on February 27, 1855, when representatives of the nineteen Long Prairie bands signed a treaty with the United States accepting a large portion of Blue Earth County as their new reservation home. While smaller than Long Prairie, this "Blue Earth" reservation was home to some of the most fertile farm ground in the Minnesota Territory and located further south near modern-day Mankato.

=== Winnebago Treaty of 1855 ===
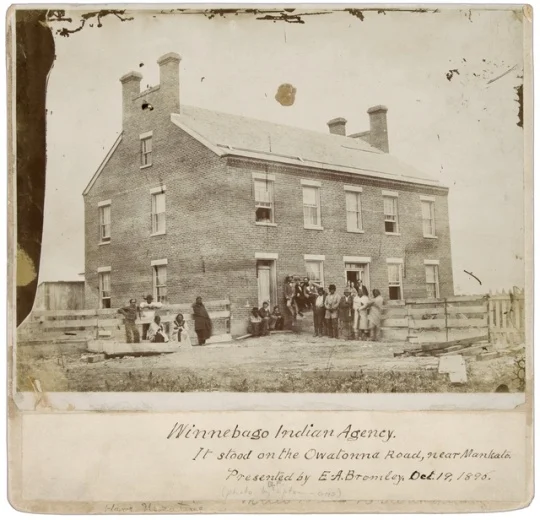
The building pictured is the Blue Earth Indian Reservation's Indian Agency located on Owatonna Road near Mankato, Minnesota.

Ho-Chunk leaders had attempted to obtain land in present-day Wright County, Minnesota; however, this effort was met with settler resistance. Settlers drafted a petition against allowing this land deal to proceed. This petition was presented to the Minnesota Territorial Legislature and honored. An alternative site near Mankato, Minnesota, was agreed upon and a treaty was signed on March 23, 1855. According to this treaty, the previous "Long Prairie" reservation was dissolved. The Ho-Chunk moved to an 18-square-mile permanent home three miles outside Mankato, referred to as the Blue Earth Reservation.

Ho-Chunk leaders agreed to move to this new reservation in exchange for $70,000 in improvements to break in the land, erect fencing, build homes, and purchase livestock. Treaty funds were also reserved for agricultural implements, household furniture, and other things that the president of the U.S. thought would "promote advancement in civilization". The treaty also gave the U.S. the ability to survey the land and assign tracts of land up to 80 acres to heads of household that were over 21 years of age. Lastly, the U.S. reserved the right to take back any undeveloped land and build roads through the reservation. Both of these last provisions led to eventual allotment four years after the reservation was created.

=== Life at Blue Earth Reservation ===
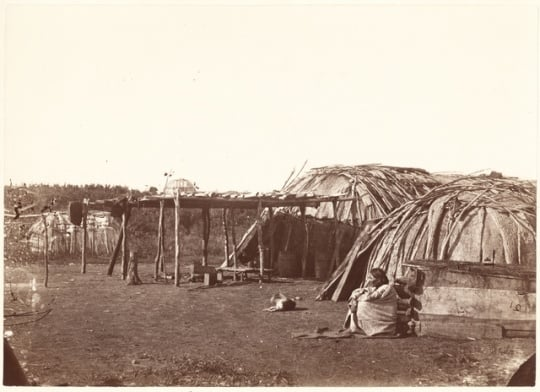
Ho-Chunk woman sitting outside a shelter on the Blue Earth Reservation.

Shortly after the 1855 treaty signing, all 19 bands of Ho-Chunk living at Long Prairie moved to the Blue Earth Reservation. The 1855 treaty made it illegal for settlers to live on the Blue Earth Reservation. White settlers who had been living illegally on the land were paid to leave yet these settlers were still upset. Settlers near the reservation bought guard dogs in order to intimidate the Ho-Chunk into staying on the reservation. On June 2, settlers held a meeting in an attempt to come to a resolution and eliminate the reservation so they could live on the land without any trouble from the government. The resolution drafted asked to have Ho-Chunk removed. It was sent to the Minnesota Territorial Legislature, which, in turn forwarded it along to the United States Legislature.

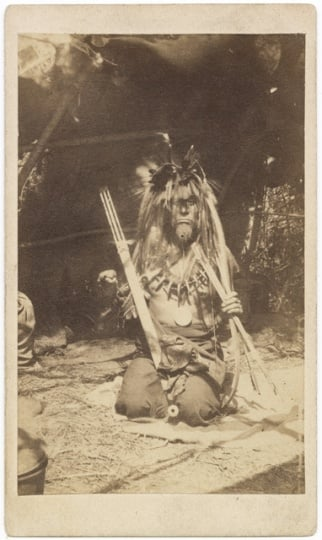
Ho-Chunk leader recognized as the head chief at Blue Earth Reservation prior to the Winnebago Treaty of 1859.

In the years that immediately followed the Minnesota Joint Resolution, the U.S. drafted a new treaty which allotted the land at Blue Earth and took nearly half of the Blue Earth Reservation. The U.S. heavily pressured the Ho-Chunk to sign this Treaty of 1859 causing Ho-Chunk leadership to split on how to proceed. One side, led by Winneshiek, opposed the treaty by blocking U.S. surveyors and breaking the surveyors' tools. The other side, led by Baptiste Lasallier, also opposed the treaty but believed accepting the treaty would be for the best for the Ho-Chunk as it would give additional legitimately to their land ownership and ease conflicts with settlers. The U.S. responded by demoting Winneshiek as head chief and appointing Lasallier as his replacement. Lasallier was given a medal and troops were sent to arrest Winneshiek. Having secured the new treaty, the U.S. split the Blue Earth Reservation in half. Settlers began moving onto the land as the Ho-Chunk moved to the Western half of the former reservation.

=== U.S. Dakota War of 1862 ===
In 1862, the U.S. Dakota War between the Ho-Chunk's neighbors, the Dakota, and Minnesota settlers broke out. The Dakota's leader Little Crow asked the Ho-Chunk to fight against Minnesota settlers. The Ho-Chunk refused. Prior to the Dakota attack, Ho-Chunk from the Blue Earth Reservation warned white settlers in the area of the danger that was coming. As the war progressed, the settlers falsely claimed the Ho-Chunk were participating in the war. When the war ended, fifteen Ho-Chunk were charged for participating alongside the Dakota. Two out of these fifteen Ho-Chunk were found guilty and sentenced to death. Later, all fifteen of these individuals had their convictions overturned and no Ho-Chunk was found guilty of fighting against the U.S.

After the U.S. Dakota War of 1862, settlers in Minnesota used the outrage that existed against Native Americans to push for removing the Ho-Chunk even though the Ho-Chunk had not joined with the Dakota in the war. In December 1862, a bill to exile the Ho-Chunk was introduced. It utilized part of the earlier Winnebago Treaty of 1859 which gave the U.S. president the power to change terms "as he sees fit". Then, in March 1863, President Abraham Lincoln signed the Ho-Chunk removal bill and all Ho-Chunk were ordered to leave the Blue Earth Reservation.

=== The Knights of the Forest ===
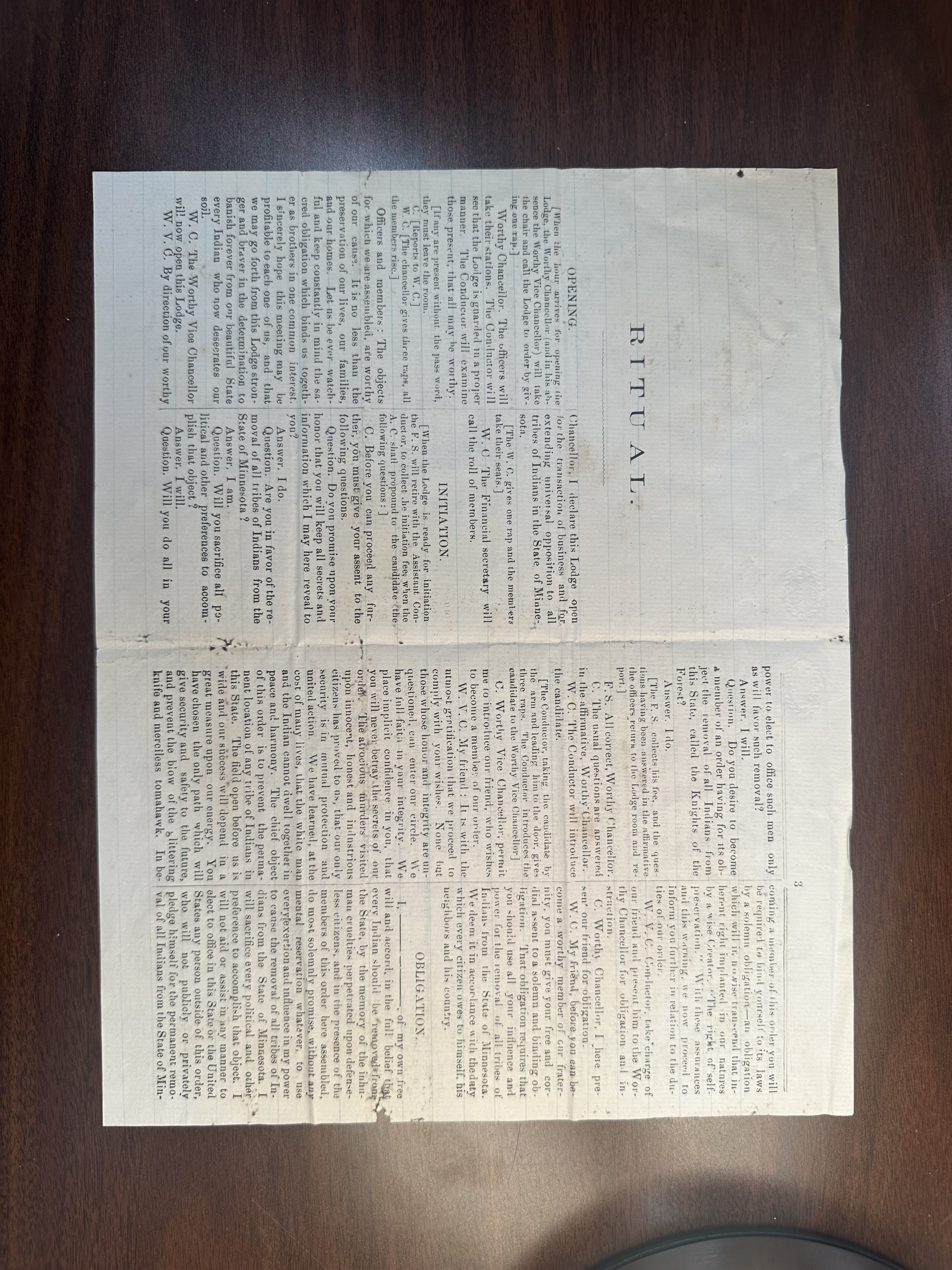
This initiation ritual of the Knights of the Forest was left in an 1869 time capsule at Old Main on the Minnesota State University, Mankato campus. It describes the initiation ceremony for its members.

The Knights of the Forest was founded on January 1, 1863, after the Dakota removal from the Mankato area and the mass hanging which took place in Mankato. This hate group had the goal of recruiting more members to their society and removing all Native Americans from Minnesota. Eventually, the group grew to have three branches located in the area (Mankato, Meriden, and Garden City). In later newspaper stories of their activities, members of this secret society claimed to have killed Native Americans that attempted to leave the Blue Earth Reservation. The white settlers in the area eventually sent a petition to Abraham Lincoln asking to remove the Ho-Chunk Indians claiming the removal would help protect Ho-Chunk from settler violence.

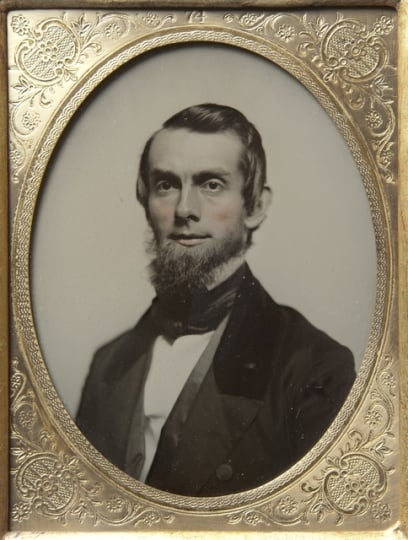
Balcombe was the US Indian Agent assigned to the Blue Earth Reservation.

While later accounts by members of the Knights of the Forest claim to have killed Ho-Chunk who left the reservation, historians have yet to find evidence of this. The Indian Agent assigned to the Blue Earth Reservation, St. Andre Durand Balcombe, wrote that a general fear of violence existed and the Ho-Chunk could no longer leave the reservation safely. In response to this general fear, Balcombe asked the US military to help protect the Ho-Chunk from settler violence. For the next nine months, the U.S. sent troops to the reservation to make sure settlers did not harm the Ho-Chunk people. In March 1863, President Abraham Lincoln signed a bill to remove the Ho-Chunk people from Minnesota.

=== Ho-Chunk response to forced removal ===
When faced with forced removal, the Ho-Chunk at Blue Earth took four different paths. The first was to follow the orders of the U.S. Army to gather at Camp Porter in Mankato, board steamboats, and leave the state. In all, about 1,300 Ho-Chunk took this path. The second path taken by approximately seven hundred Ho-Chunk was to stay with the resistance leader Winneshiek and hide out on the reservation. The U.S. Army found this group and brought them to Camp Porter. Once at Camp Porter, they were also taken by steamboat out of Minnesota. Historians estimate that 800 of the two thousand Ho-Chunk that chose to comply with U.S. Army died from hunger and exposure to the cold prior to reaching their final destination in Nebraska.

Attempting to become a Minnesota citizen and using this citizenship to stay in Minnesota, was a third way Ho-Chunk used to stay at Blue Earth. The Minnesota Constitution stated mixed race people could become citizens of Minnesota if they: spoke English, adopted white customs, and had a district court judge grant them citizenship. When this third group approached a judge in Waseca County, instead of granting citizenship, the judge had them arrested. Of the forty arrested, twenty-three sought out lawyers to try to get their land back and become citizens. Soon after, twenty-four of these men joined Minnesota regiments in the U.S. Civil War to boost their claim that they were citizens. As a result of their military service, Minnesota lawmakers allowed their families to stay in Minnesota while they served. For one thousand remaining Ho-Chunk the idea of moving further from their ancestral land or fighting in the Civil War was too much, these individuals escaped back to Wisconsin and lived the rest of their lives off the grid as outlaws.

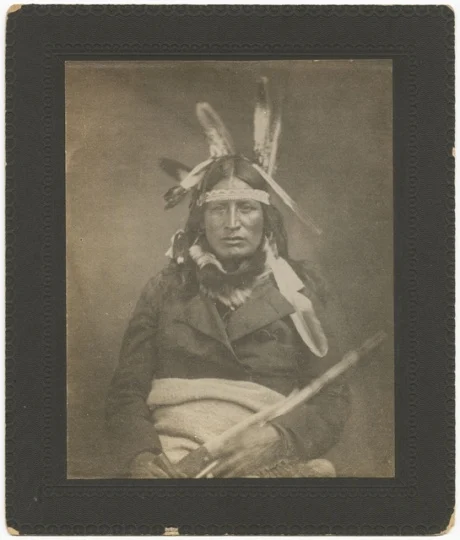
Ho-Chunk leader recognized as head chief of the Ho-Chunk at Blue Earth Reservation after 1859 Treaty.

=== Blue Earth Reservation after the Ho-Chunk removal ===
The Blue Earth Reservation was supposed to be sold to settlers at auction. However, settlers began moving onto the reservation prior to these auctions taking place. In just the two months following President Lincoln's removal order, 150 settler claims were made on the reservation. These settlers dug up Ho-Chunk graves looking for goods and artifacts. Most of these settlers lived in Ho-Chunk homes while they build their own homes. As a result, many of the auctions for Ho-Chunk land never took place.

Ho-Chunk that served in Minnesota regiments during the U.S. Civil War and sought citizenship were allowed to stay in Minnesota. Once the war was over, these individuals returned to the former Blue Earth Reservation area. In 1870, U.S. Senators inserted a passage into a bill that allowed this group of veterans and their families to get back their originally assigned Blue Earth reservation allotments. The bill stated the group was to receive new lands if settlers had moved onto their original allotments. Additionally, the bill gave this group an ability to take a loyalty oath to the United States before a federal judge to receive U.S. citizenship. In all, 160 Ho-Chunk used the verbiage of this bill to obtain U.S. citizenship including former head chief Baptiste Lasallier.

=== Historical significance ===
The Ho Chunk experiences at the Blue Earth Reservation had a lasting impact on their nation which is still felt today. A victim of the anti-Indian sentiment that swept through Minnesota following the Dakota War of 1862, they had to decide whether to follow removal orders which would ultimately bring them to Nebraska where they would create the Winnebago Tribe of Nebraska or escape back to Wisconsin, live as outlaws and eventually form the Ho Chunk Nation of Wisconsin. A few Ho Chunk members found a third path of pursuing citizenship through Civil War service allowing them to stay in Minnesota, be granted citizenship in the 1870s and become a precedent for other groups seeking U.S. citizenship.
