= Bassett, California =

Settlement in Los Angeles County, California

Location within Los Angeles County, California

Bassett is an unincorporated community in the San Gabriel Valley, in Los Angeles County, California, United States, within the Census-designated places boundaries of Avocado Heights and West Puente Valley. Its ZIP Code is 91746 and it uses area code 626.

== History ==
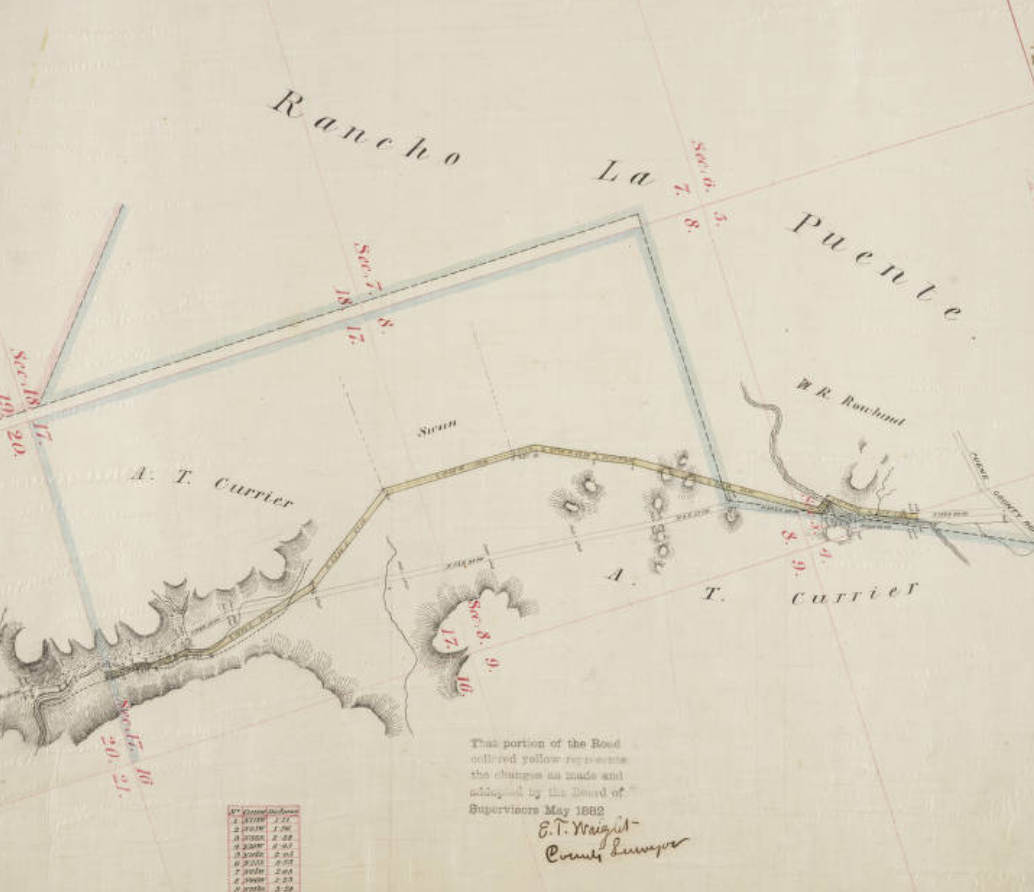
Modern-day Bassett sits on land that was originally part of Rancho La Puente, a Mexican era rancho grant.

Joseph Workman, the son of William Workman, owned 814 acres (3.29 km^{2}) of the Rancho La Puente land, and borrowed money on the property. He was not able to keep up the mortgage payments so the bank acquired the property. In 1895, O.T. Bassett bought the property and Bassett Township was established. In 1921, Josephine (Workman) Akley, the youngest child of Joseph Workman, won a lawsuit to recover an interest in the Rancho La Puente land that her father sold. However, the decision was reversed in 1922.

== Education ==
- Bassett Unified School District
- Bassett High School

== Notable people ==
- Clyde Beck (1900–1988) was a right-handed infielder in Major League Baseball for the Chicago Cubs and Cincinnati Reds from 1926 to 1931.

== See also ==
- List of Ranchos of California
- Ranchos of California
