= Artie Ortego =

American actor (1890–1960)

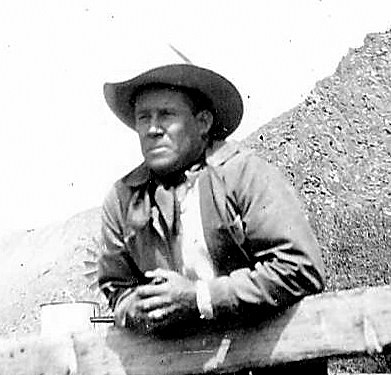
- Ortego in 1930
- Born: Arthur A. Ortega; February 9, 1890; San Jose, California, U.S.
- Died: July 24, 1960 (aged 70); Burbank, California, U.S.
- Resting place: San Fernando Mission Cemetery
- Occupation: Actor
- Years active: 1912–1959
- Spouses: Marie Manley (m. 1911; div. 1916) Billie Mack (m. 1917)
- Children: 1

Artie A. Ortego (February 9, 1890 – July 24, 1960) was an American actor. He appeared in more than 240 films between 1912 and 1955. Ortego portrayed cowboys, henchmen and American Indians in a large number of westerns and performed horse riding stunts. He was also a stunt double for Ramón Novarro in The Barbarian (1933), which is set in Cairo and also stars Myrna Loy.

== Biography ==
A full-blooded Mission Indian, Ortego was born in San Jose, California, the son of Benjamin Ortega and Rosa Gardnos. His siblings were Mary Ortega and Ben Ortega. In 1900, the family lived at 753 Orchard Street in San Jose. His father was a butcher.

His debut was in the role as Moon Face in Bison Motion Pictures' silent western short The Tattoo (1912) opposite Mona Darkfeather and William Bertram. Ortego starred in 41 movies with Darkfeather, 33 of which are known to be directed by her husband, Frank Montgomery. The last of their joint ventures was The Gambler's Reformation (1914), in which Ortego played an Indian named Brown Bear.

Ortego played the role as Delgado in the adventure comedy/drama American Aristocracy (1916) starring Douglas Fairbanks and Jewel Carmen. When he registered for the draft of World War I, on June 5, 1917, Ortego gave his home address as 771 Orchard Street, San Jose. He appeared in two movies that year, as The Rat in The Great Secret starring Francis X. Bushman and Beverly Bayne and as Taggart's Indian in The Avenging Trail starring Harold Lockwood and Sally Crute.

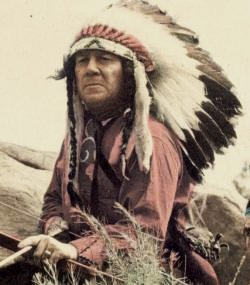
Ortego in the role of a Native American

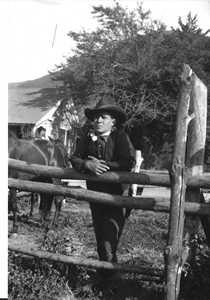

In 1920, Ortego was living in a hotel at 920 West Third Street, Los Angeles. He appeared in one movie that year, as Little Wolf in Skyfire starring and directed by Neal Hart. That was followed by two shorts starring Hoot Gibson, The Driftin' Kid with Gertrude Olmstead, who later credited Ortego with teaching her to perform a flying mount, and The Man Who Woke Up (both 1921). Ortego appeared in his first talkie as a vaquero in Beyond the Rio Grande (1930) starring Jack Perrin. In 1931, he played the stage driver in Galloping Thru starring Tom Tyler and Betty Mack. He appeared in 14 movies starring John Wayne, including Randy Rides Alone (1934), The Desert Trail (1935), director John Ford's Stagecoach (1939) with Claire Trevor, and A Lady Takes a Chance (1943) with Jean Arthur. His final movie appearance was in director Allan Dwan's jungle adventure Escape to Burma (1955) starring Barbara Stanwyck and Robert Ryan for RKO Pictures.

He also made a number of guest appearances on television programs, including roles on The Cisco Kid (1950, 1951 and |1952), The Range Rider (1951), Cowboy G-Men (1953), Hopalong Cassidy (1953) and Maverick (1959).

Artie Ortego died at age 70 of a stroke in St. Joseph's Hospital, Burbank, California. He is interred in San Fernando Mission Cemetery, Mission Hills.

== Selected filmography ==
- A Forest Romance (1913, Short)
- For the Peace of Bear Valley (1913, Short) - Ortega
- The Girl of the Golden West (1915) - Antonio
- American Aristocracy (1916) - Delgado
- The Great Secret (1917, Serial) - The Rat
- The Avenging Trail (1917) - Taggart's IIndian
- Broadway Bill (1918) - Wabishke
- Skyfire (1920) - Little Wolf
- The Driftin' Kid (1921, Short)
- The Man Who Woke Up (1921, Short)
- Riding with Death (1921) - Tony Carilla
- The Riddle Rider (1924)
- Dangerous Odds (1925)
- Two-Fisted Jones (1925) - Buck Oxford
- The Winking Idol (1926)
- The Valley of Bravery (1926)
- Under Western Skies (1926)
- Beyond the Rio Grande (1930)
- Hidden Valley (1932)
- The Lucky Texan (1934)
- West of the Divide (1934)
- Blue Steel (1934)
- The Man from Utah (1934)
- Randy Rides Alone (1934)
- The Star Packer (1934)
- The Man Trailer (1934)
- The Trail Beyond (1934)
- The Lawless Frontier (1934)
- 'Neath the Arizona Skies (1934)
- Texas Terror (1935)
- Lightning Triggers (1935)
- Rainbow Valley (1935)
- The Desert Trail (1935)
- Stagecoach (1939)
- A Lady Takes a Chance (1943)
- The Ghost Rider (1943)
- Robin Hood of Monterey (1947)
- Desert Pursuit (1952)
