= For the Peace of Bear Valley =

1913 western short film

- Directed by: Frank E. Montgomery
- Produced by: David Horsley
- Starring: Harry van Meter; Mona Darkfeather
- Distributed by: Universal Film Manufacturing Company
- Release date: September 22, 1913
- Country: United States
- Languages: Silent; English intertitles

For the Peace of Bear Valley is a 1913 American silent short Western directed by Frank E. Montgomery. The film stars Harry van Meter and Mona Darkfeather.

== Cast ==
- Harry van Meter as The Sheriff
- Mona Darkfeather as Mona
- Inez Fanjoy as Dell
- Arthur Ortego as Ortega
- Harry Schumm as The Lumber Merchant
