= Mona Darkfeather =

American actress

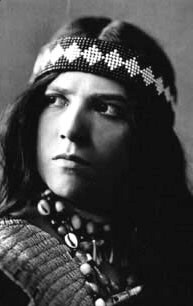
- Born: Josephine M. Workman; January 13, 1882; Boyle Heights, California, US
- Died: September 3, 1977 (aged 95); Los Angeles, California, US
- Occupation: Actress
- Years active: 1911 to 1917
- Spouse(s): Frank Montgomery (1912–1928); Alfred G. Wessling (1928–1935); Frank Montgomery (1937–1944)
- Parents: Joseph Manuel Workman (1833–1901); Josephine Mary Belt (1851–1937)

Josephine M. Workman, better known by her stage name Princess Mona Darkfeather (January 13, 1882 – September 3, 1977), was an American actress who starred in Native American and Western dramas. During the silent era of motion pictures, from 1911 to 1917, she appeared in 102 movies. She is best known for her role as Prairie Flower in The Vanishing Tribe (1914).

Her career began in 1909 when she replied to a local newspaper advertisement placed by producer/director Thomas Ince's Bison Motion Pictures. The movie studio was looking for an actress with the physical attributes to portray an American Indian and who was physically capable of doing stunts and riding horses. While she had never acted before, Workman fit the appearance that Ince wanted. She apparently embellished her riding skills, as she did not have any, but nevertheless quickly learned horsemanship. Given the stage name Mona Darkfeather (and later "Princess" Mona Darkfeather), she was cast in her first starring role as an Indian maiden named Owanee in the 1911 movie Owanee's Great Love.

== Early life ==
She was born Josephine M. Workman in Boyle Heights, California, and baptized at the Plaza Church, Los Angeles, when she was four months old. A member of the prominent pioneer Workman-Temple family of Los Angeles, she was the daughter of Joseph Manuel Workman (1833–1901) and Josephine Mary Belt (1851–1937). Her siblings were Mary Cristina Workman (1870–1963); Agnes Elizabeth Workman (1872–1957); Marie Lucile "Lucy" Workman (1875–1944); William Joseph Workman (1877–1956); George D. Workman (1879–1903); and Nellie Workman (1886–1888).

Her grandparents were William Workman (1799-1876), a native of England, and Nicolasa Urioste (1802-1892), who hailed from Taos, New Mexico. According to the Workman and Temple Family Homestead Museum, her paternal grandmother Nicolasa was of Taos Pueblo descent. Her mother was of Scottish and Chilean descent. Darkfeather claimed Spanish ancestry as well. In 1870, her grandfather, William Workman (1799–1876), deeded 814 acres (3.29 km^{2}) of land, a portion of the Rancho La Puente, to his son, Joseph M. Workman. Through this deed, the land would go to Joseph's children upon his death.

Her parents separated in 1893, and Josephine lived with her mother. Joseph Workman deeded his Rancho La Puente land to O.T. Bassett, in 1895. On March 22, 1915, Josephine (Belt) Workman married David D. Parten (1857–1929), a law enforcement officer who died after being accidentally hit by a backing car.

== Married life ==
In 1906, Darkfeather married Harry Martin Knoll, who died two years later in 1908. Darkfeather then married film director and actor Frank E. Montgomery (born Frank Akley; 1870–1944) in 1912. In 1914, Frank E. Montgomery moved to Spokane, Washington to open and direct at the Frank E. Montgomery of the Spokane School of Motion Picture Acting. Darkfeather became associated with the company as an instructor.

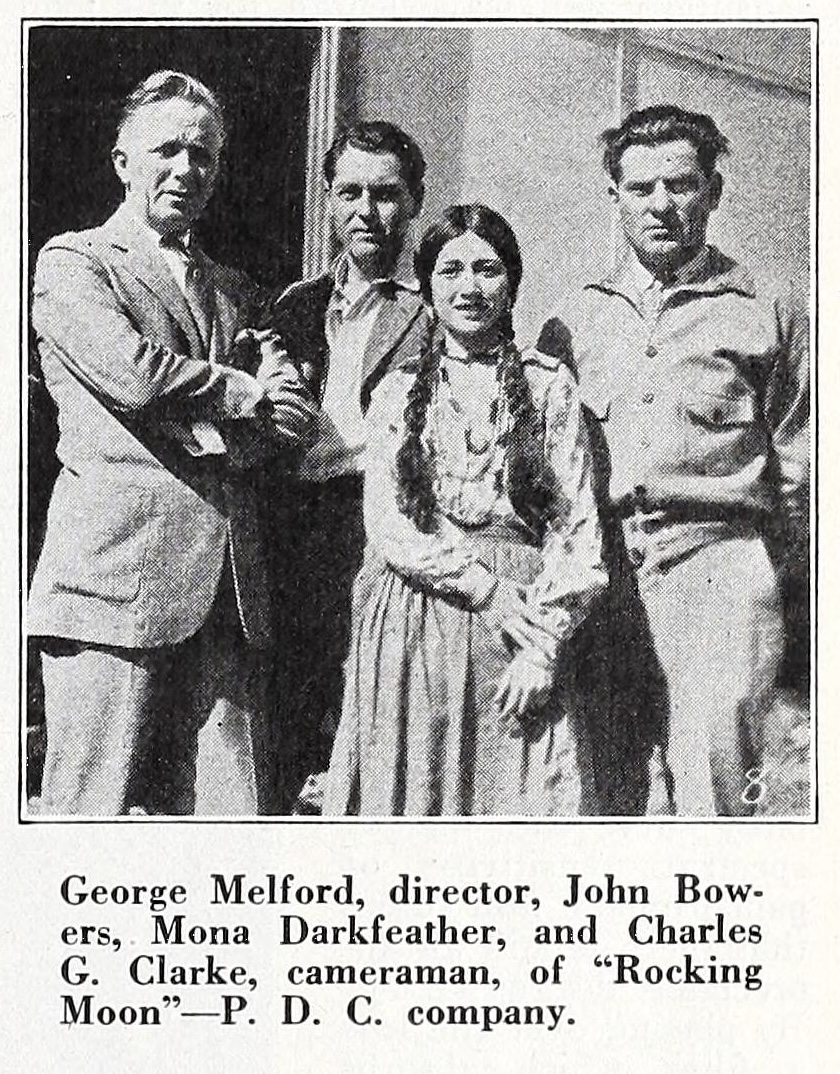
Exhibitor's Herald, 1927

Darkfeather and Montgomery divorced in 1928. In late 1928, Darkfeather married banker and financer Alfred Wessling until their divorce in 1935. On December 23, 1937, Montgomery and Darkfeather remarried after nine years of separation and remained married until Montgomery's death in 1944.

== Film career ==
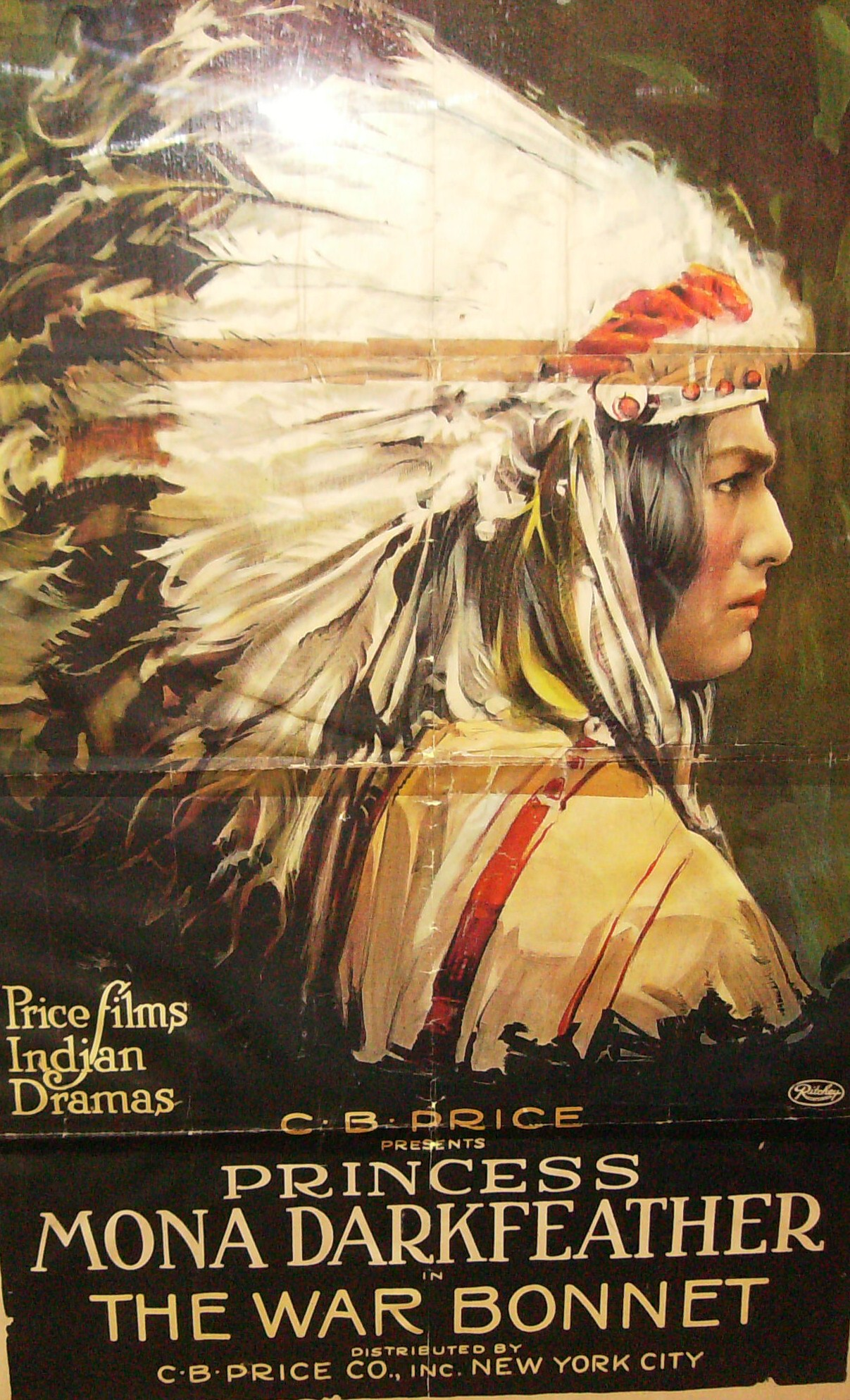
The War Bonnet (1914)

After replying in 1909 to a Bison Motion Pictures newspaper ad, which called for "exotic-looking girls" to play "Indian maidens", she soon became famous as "Princess Mona Darkfeather", noted for leaping onto her pinto pony, "Comanche", and galloping away bareback.

Darkfeather was a noted moving picture artist who regularly starred in roles of Indian and Western dramas. Although she was mostly of European and Chilean descent, Darkfeather's early publicity claimed she was a full-blooded Blackfoot Indian. She said she was an Indian Princess and had been made a blood member of the Blackfoot Nation and given the title of princess by a "Chief Big Thunder".

The Western Border starring Mona Darkfeather, 1915 (Collection of Doug Neilson)

She played Indian roles in one-reel western melodrama shorts, such as A White Indian (1912) and A Blackfoot's Conspiracy (1912), as well as feature length movies. She was by then a major movie star. She also played leading roles as Spanish women in several historical dramas.

Darkfeather regularly appeared in Montgomery's films through various motion picture companies that he worked for, including Bison Company, Universal, Kalem Company, and Sawyer Inc. Under the tutelage of her husband/director Frank E Montgomery, Darkfeather played Indian and several Spanish leads in many Bison Company Productions. Darkfeather made movies for Bison starting in 1909, the Selig Polyscope Company between 1909 and 1913, Nestor Studios in 1912 and for Kalem Studios beginning in 1913. Montgomery directed her in the 101-Bison two-reeler The Massacre of the Fourth Cavalry (1912). Other films he directed her in include A Forest Romance, For the Peace of Bear Valley and Justice of the Wild, all released in 1913, in which she played opposite Harry von Meter.

Darkfeather was Cecil B. DeMille's first choice to portray the Indian wife, Nat-u-ritch, in his famous western The Squaw Man (1914), but she was too busy, as she and Montgomery were producing their own movies independently for release through the Kalem Company, and she was unavailable to play the role.

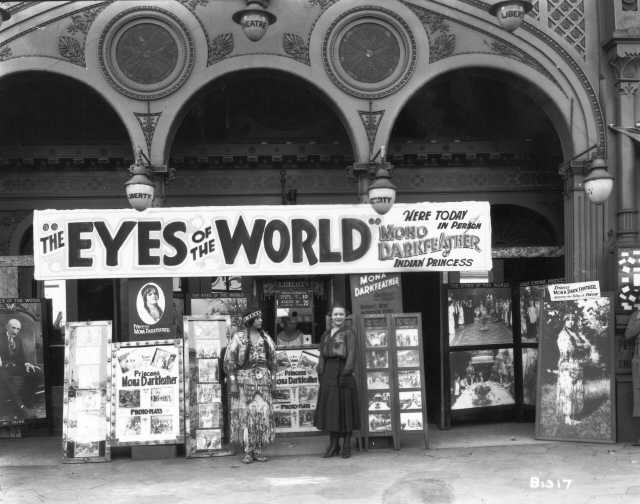
Princess Darkfeather, Liberty Theater, Tacoma, Washington, 1918

She and Montgomery joined the Universal Film Company in 1914 and continued to collaborate on scores of westerns. Darkfeather appeared in her last movie, The Hidden Danger, in 1917, then retired from the screen.

For a while after she retired as a screen actress, she performed on the stage and headlined as Princess Darkfeather. In late August 1918, she made a special appearance at the Liberty Theater in Tacoma, Washington, as actress, singer and lecturer. In her "rattlesnake" dress, she appeared after each showing of the feature movie, Eyes of the World (1917) starring Monroe Salisbury, to sing and give advice to all girls in the audience with ambition to enter show business.

She and her husband, Frank Montgomery, were living at 1117 3rd Avenue in Seattle, Washington, in September 1918, when he registered with the local draft board for World War I. He gave his present occupation as photoplay star manager. In 1920, they were back in Los Angeles, living at 2518 Maple Avenue.

== Filmography ==
- A Cheyenne's Love for a Sioux (1910), Bison. Cast includes: Mona Darkfeather and Frank Montgomery
- Owanee's Great Love (1911), Bison. Cast includes: Mona Darkfeather
- A Squaw's Retribution (1911), Bison. Cast includes: Mona Darkfeather
- Blacksnake's Treachery (1911), Bison. Cast includes: Mona Darkfeather
- Darkfeather, the Squaw (1911), Bison. Cast includes: Mona Darkfeather
- An Indian Love Story (1911), Bison. Cast includes: Mona Darkfeather and Dove Eye
- White Fawn's Peril (1911), Bison. Cast includes: Mona Darkfeather
- A Spanish Wooing (1911), Selig Polyscope Company. Cast includes: Mona Darkfeather, Sydney Ayres, Frank Richardson, Frank Clark
- The Night Herder (1911), Selig Polyscope Company. Cast includes: Mona Darkfeather, Tom Santschi, Frank Clark, Dell Eagles
- Bunkie (1912), Selig Polyscope Company. Cast includes: Mona Darkfeather, Hobart Bosworth, Fred Huntley, Phil Stratton
- As Told by Princess Bess (1912), Selig Polyscope Company. Cast includes: Mona Darkfeather, Eugenie Besserer, Hobart Bosworth, Frank Richardson
- Crucial Test, A (1912), Dir. Frank E Montgomery; Cast includes: Hobart Bosworth, Herbert Rawlinson, Tom Santschi, Mona Darkfeather, Fred Huntley, Roy Watson
- At Old Fort Dearborn (1912), Bison. Cast includes: Mona Darkfeather and Charles Bartlett
- Darkfeather's Strategy (1912), Selig Polyscope Company. Cast includes: Mona Darkfeather, Hobart Bosworth, Tom Santschi, Frank Richardson
- The End of the Romance (1912), Selig Polyscope Company. Cast includes: Mona Darkfeather, Hobart Bosworth, Eugenie Besserer, Herbert Rawlinson
- The Hand of Fate (1912), Selig Polyscope Company. Cast includes: Mona Darkfeather, Hobart Bosworth, Al Ernest Garcia, Fernando Gálvez
- A White Indian (1912), Bison. Cast includes: Mona Darkfeather
- The Massacre of Santa Fe Trail (1912), Bison. Cast includes: Mona Darkfeather, Charles Bartlett, Lee Morris, Roy Watson
- At Old Fort Dearborn (1912), Bison. Cast includes: Mona Darkfeather and Charles Bartlett
- When Uncle Sam Was Young (1912), Cast includes: Mona Darkfeather and Virginia Chester
- The Tattoo (1912), Bison. Cast includes: Mona Darkfeather, William Bertram, Artie Ortego, Jack Leonard
- Star Eyes' Stratagem (1912), Bison. Cast includes: Mona Darkfeather, Artie Ortego, Charles Bartlett
- Trapper Bill, King of Scouts (1912), Bison. Cast includes: Mona Darkfeather, Charles Bartlett, Roy Watson
- A Red Man's Love (1912), Bison. Cast includes: Mona Darkfeather, William Bertram, Charles Bartlett, Artie Ortego
- An Indian Ishmael (1912), Bison. Cast includes: Mona Darkfeather, Chief Harvey, Chief Phillipi, Roy Watson
- Blackfoot Conspiracy (1912), Bison. Cast includes: Mona Darkfeather
- The Half-Breed Scout (1912), Bison. Cast includes: Mona Darkfeather, Roy Watson, Charles Bartlett, Virginia Chester
- The Massacre of the Fourth Cavalry (1912), Bison. Cast includes: Mona Darkfeather, Charles Bartlett, Roy Watson, William Bertram
- Big Rock's Last Stand (1912), Bison. Dir. Frank Montgomery; Cast includes: Mona Darkfeather, William Bertram, Art Ortega, Virginia Chester, Roy Watson
- Apache Father's Vengeance, An (1913) Bison. Cast includes: Mona Darkfeather
- Mona of the Modocs (1913), Bison. Cast includes: Mona Darkfeather
- The Song of the Telegraph (1913), Bison. Cast includes: Mona Darkfeather, Artie Ortego, Charles Bartlett
- The Red Girl's Sacrifice (1913), Bison. Cast includes: Mona Darkfeather
- The Return of Thunder Cloud's Spirit (1913), Bison. Cast includes: Mona Darkfeather and Helen Case
- The Half Breed Parson (1913), Bison. Cast includes: Mona Darkfeather, Francis Ford, Grace Cunard
- Owana, the Devil Woman (1913), Nestor Film Company. Cast includes: Mona Darkfeather and Artie Ortego
- The Spring in the Desert (1913), Nestor Film Company. Cast includes: Mona Darkfeather and Artie Ortego
- Apache Love (1913), Nestor Film Company. Cast includes: Mona Darkfeather, Artie Ortego, Chief Harvey
- Mona (1913), Nestor Film Company. Cast includes: Mona Darkfeather, William Bertram, Artie Ortego
- The Snake (1913), Bison. Cast includes: Mona Darkfeather, Harry von Meter, Artie Ortego, Lee Shumway
- Darkfeather's Sacrifice (1913), Nestor Film Company. Cast includes: Mona Darkfeather
- Juanita (1913), Nestor Film Company. Cast includes: Mona Darkfeather, J. Gunnis Davis, Lawrence Peyton
- When the Blood Calls (1913), Nestor Film Company. Cast includes: Mona Darkfeather, Artie Ortego, Lawrence Peyton
- The Oath of Conchita (1913), Nestor Film Company. Cast includes: Mona Darkfeather
- The Love of Men (1913), Bison. Cast includes: Mona Darkfeather
- A Forest Romance (1913), Bison. Cast includes: Mona Darkfeather, Harry von Meter, J. Gunnis Davis
- For the Peace of Bear Valley (1913), Nestor Film Company. Cast includes: Mona Darkfeather, Harry von Meter, Inez Fanjoy
- Justice of the Wild (1913), Nestor Film Company. Cast includes: Mona Darkfeather, Harry von Meter, L.J. Anderson
- Against Desperate Odds (1913), Kalem. Cast includes: Mona Darkfeather, Rex Downs, Charles Bartlett
- An Indian Maid's Strategy (1913), Kalem. Cast includes: Mona Darkfeather, Artie Ortego, Chief Eagle Wing
- Her Indian Brother (1913), Kalem. Cast includes: Mona Darkfeather, Artie Ortego, Anna De Lisle
- A Dream of the Wild (1914), Kalem. Mona Darkfeather, Charles Bartlett, Artie Ortego
- Indian Blood (1914), Kalem. Cast includes: Mona Darkfeather, Charles Bartlett, Buster Emmons
- Red Hawk's Sacrifice (1914), Kalem. Mona Darkfeather, Artie Ortego, Charles Bartlett
- The Paleface Brave (1914), Kalem. Mona Darkfeather, Charles Bartlett, Artie Ortego
- The Indian Ambuscade (1914), Kalem. Cast includes: Mona Darkfeather, Charles Bartlett, Artie Ortego
- Indian Fate (1914), Kalem. Cast includes: Mona Darkfeather, Lucille Neath, Charles Bartlett
- An Indian's Honor (1914), Kalem. Cast includes: Mona Darkfeather, Artie Ortego, Charles Bartlett
- The Tigers of the Hills (1914), Kalem. Cast includes: Mona Darkfeather, Charles Bartlett, Billie Rhodes, J. Gunnis Davis
- The Hopi Raiders (1914), Kalem. Cast includes: Mona Darkfeather, Rex Downs, Charles Bartlett
- The Medicine Man's Vengeance (1914), Kalem. Cast includes: Mona Darkfeather, Artie Ortego, J. Gunnis Davis
- His Indian Nemesis (1914), Kalem. Cast includes: Mona Darkfeather, Artie Ortego, J. Gunnis Davis
- The Navajo Blanket (1914), Kalem. Cast includes: Artie Ortego, Mona Darkfeather, Big Moon
- The Fight on Deadwood Trail (1914), Kalem. Cast includes: Mona Darkfeather, Charles Bartlett, Anna De Lisle, Jack Messick
- Grey Eagle's Last Stand (1914), Kalem. Cast includes: Big Moon, Eagle Feather, Mona Darkfeather
- The War Bonnet (1914), Kalem. Cast includes: Artie Ortego, Mona Darkfeather, Rex Downs
- The Redskins and the Renegades (1914), Kalem. Cast includes: Big Moon, Mona Darkfeather, Chief Eagle Wing
- Bottled Spider, The (1914) Kalem. Cast includes: Mona Darkfeather
- At the End of the Rope (1914), Kalem. Cast includes: Mona Darkfeather
- Coming of Lone Wolf, The (1914) Kalem. Cast includes: Mona Darkfeather
- Call of the Tribe, The (1914) Kalem. Cast includes: Mona Darkfeather, Art Ortega, Big Moon, Eva Smith
- The Squaw's Revenge (1914), Kalem. Cast includes: Mona Darkfeather, Rex Downs, Juanita Martenis
- The Gypsy Gambler (1914), Kalem. Cast includes: Mona Darkfeather, Charles Bartlett, Rex Downs
- Brought to Justice (1914) Kalem. Cast includes: Mona Darkfeather
- Cave of Death, The (1914), Kalem. Cast includes: Mona Darkfeather
- Vengeance of Winona, The (1914)
- The Stolen Invention (1915), Monty Film. Cast includes: Mona Darkfeather
- A Message for Help (1915), Bison. Cast includes: Mona Darkfeather
- None So Blind (1916)
- Circle of Death, The (1916), Cast includes: Mona Darkfeather
- The Crimson Arrow (1917), Universal. Cast includes: Mona Darkfeather

== Later life ==
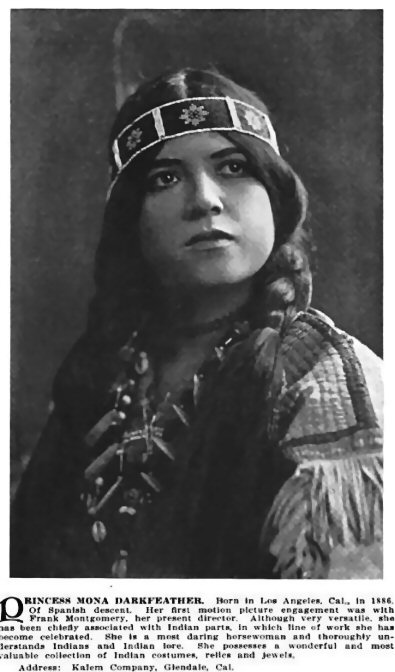
Who's Who in the Film World: 1914

In late January 1921, she won a lawsuit in Los Angeles, which she initiated on June 24, 1918, against Charles N. Bassett to recover an interest in the Rancho La Puente land that her father sold to Bassett's father in 1895. Although she had been 12 years of age in 1895, she was never served with a summons to quit title as an heir of the property, as were her older brothers and sisters. The decision gave her a one-ninth interest in 315 acres (1.27 km^{2}) of what was said to be the largest walnut grove in California, at Bassett Station, near El Monte, and she was awarded a cash judgment for $129,163. The decision was reversed, however, by the Supreme Court at San Francisco, on September 22, 1922.

Darkfeather and Montgomery were divorced in 1928. She was married again in 1928 to wealthy banker/financeer Alfred G. Wessling (1869–1941). In 1930, the Wesslings lived at 352 North Myrtle Avenue in Monrovia. They lived at 931 Manhattan Avenue in Hermosa Beach, in 1934.

She and Wessling were divorced in 1935. On December 23, 1937, she and Frank Montgomery, who was by then a technician of the Hal Roach Studios sound department, and was currently working on Merrily We Live starring Constance Bennett, were remarried in Darkfeather's home at 1420 ½ Mohawk Street, Echo Park. They remained married until his death in 1944.

Mona Darkfeather died at age 94 from a stroke, due to cerebral atherosclerosis, at a convalescent center on South Crenshaw Boulevard, Los Angeles. She is interred in section K, lot 116, grave 7, in the Holy Cross Cemetery, Culver City, California, under the name Josephine Workman.

== See also ==
- Portrayal of Native Americans in film
- Stereotypes of indigenous peoples of Canada and the United States
- Workman-Temple family
  - Pliny Fisk Temple (Francisco P. Temple)
- Boyle-Workman family
