= Bison Film Company =

American film studio

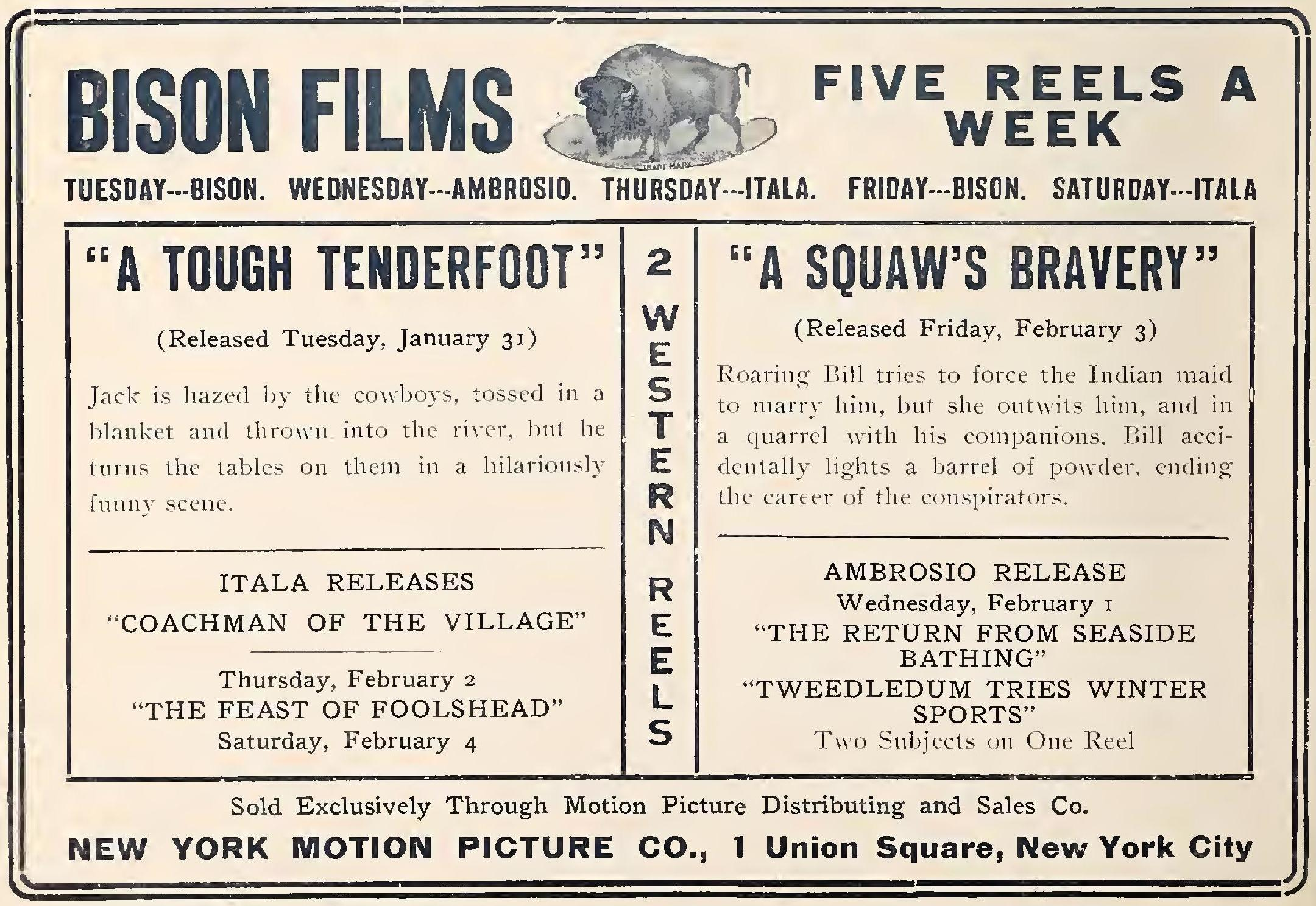
- Type: Film studio
- Industry: Entertainment
- Founded: 1909; 117 years ago
- Defunct: 1917; 109 years ago
- Fate: Transferred to Universal Film Manufacturing Company
- Headquarters: Los Angeles
- Key people: Fred Balshofer

Bison Film Company, also known as 101 Bison Film Company, was an American film studio established in 1909 and disestablished in 1917.

It partnered with Miller Brothers 101 Ranch to lease 20,000 acres to build a Western town set and an Indian village and make silent films with stars including Tom Mix, Buck Jones, Hoot Gibson and Will Rogers. It produced The Indian Massacre (1912), by Thomas H. Ince.

In 1912 it also produced The Indian Raiders, Early Days in the West, Hunted Down, A Daughter of the Redskins, The Cowboy Guardians, The Tribal Law, An Indian Outcast; in 1913 it produced In Love and War, Woman and War; and in 1915 Lone Larry, starring Kingsley Benedict.

== Filmography ==
=== 1909 ===
- Disinherited Son's Loyalty, directed by Fred J. Balshofer - short film
- Romance of a Fishermaid, directed by Fred J. Balshofer and Charles K. French - short film
- Davy Crockett - In Hearts United, directed by Fred J. Balshofer – short film
- The Squaw's Revenge, directed by Fred J. Balshofer – short film
- Why Mr. Jones Was Arrested, directed by Fred J. Balshofer – short film
- A Terrible Attempt, directed by Fred J. Balshofer
- A Cowboy's Narrow Escape, directed by Fred J. Balshofer
- The True Heart of an Indian, directed by Fred J. Balshofer and Charles Inslee
- The Blacksmith's Wife, directed by Fred J. Balshofer
- I Love My Wife, But Oh, You Kid, directed by Fred J. Balshofer
- The Gypsy Artist, directed by Fred J. Balshofer
- My Wife's Gone to the Country, directed by Fred J. Balshofer
- Sailor's Child, directed by Fred J. Balshofer
- The Yiddisher Cowboy, directed by Fred J. Balshofer
- Sheltered Under Stars and Stripes, directed by Fred J. Balshofer
- Half Breed's Treachery, directed by Fred J. Balshofer
- Secret Service Woman, directed by Fred J. Balshofer
- His Two Children, directed by Fred J. Balshofer
- The Paymaster, directed by Fred J. Balshofer
- A Kentucky Planter, directed by Fred J. Balshofer
- A Squaw's Sacrifice, directed by Fred J. Balshofer
- The Faithful Wife, directed by Fred J. Balshofer
- Dove Eye's Gratitude, directed by Fred J. Balshofer
- The Gold Seeker's Daughter, directed by Fred J. Balshofer
- Iona, the White Squaw, directed by Fred J. Balshofer
- The Mexican's Crime, directed by Fred J. Balshofer
- Young Deer's Bravery, directed by Fred J. Balshofer
- The Ranchman's Wife, directed by Fred J. Balshofer
- An Indian's Bride, directed by Fred J. Balshofer
- The Parson's Prayer, directed by Fred J. Balshofer
- Dooley's Thanksgiving Turkey, directed by Fred J. Balshofer
- The Message of an Arrow, directed by Fred J. Balshofer
- Reunited at the Gallows, directed by Fred J. Balshofer
- The Love of a Savage, directed by Fred J. Balshofer
- An Italian Love Story, directed by Fred J. Balshofer
- The Red Cross Heroine, directed by Fred J. Balshofer

=== 1910 ===
- Red Girl's Romance, directed by Fred J. Balshofer – short film
- A Redman's Devotion, directed by Fred J. Balshofer – short film
- A Forester's Sweetheart, directed by Fred J. Balshofer – short film
- A Cowboy's Reward, directed by Fred J. Balshofer – short film
- Romany Rob's Revenge, directed by Fred J. Balshofer – short film
- The Mexican's Jealousy', directed by Fred J. Balshofer – short film
- A Romance of the Prairie, directed by Fred J. Balshofer – short film
- His Imaginary Crime, directed by Fred J. Balshofer – short film
- The Female Bandit, directed by Fred J. Balshofer – short film
- By His Own Hands, directed by Fred J. Balshofer – short film
- The Ten of Spades; or, A Western Raffle, directed by Fred J. Balshofer – short film
- Young Deer's Gratitude, directed by Fred J. Balshofer – short film
- Government Rations, directed by Fred J. Balshofer – short film
- The Imposter, directed by Fred J. Balshofer – short film
- Dooley's Holiday, directed by Fred J. Balshofer – short film
- For Her Father's Honor, directed by Fred J. Balshofer – short film
- Dooley Referees the Big Fight, directed by Fred J. Balshofer – short film
- The Cowboy and the Schoolmarm, directed by Fred J. Balshofer – short film
- The New Partners, directed by Fred J. Balshofer – short film
- The Indian and the Cowgirl, directed by Fred J. Balshofer – short film
- The Rose of the Ranch, directed by Fred J. Balshofer – short film
- For His Sister's Honor, directed by Fred J. Balshofer – short film
- The Mexican's Ward', directed by Fred J. Balshofer – short film
- The Man from Texas, directed by Fred J. Balshofer – short film
- Company D to the Rescue, directed by Fred J. Balshofer – short film
- Nannina, directed by Fred J. Balshofer – short film
- A Shot in Time, directed by Fred J. Balshofer – short film
- Romance of a Snake Charmer, directed by Fred J. Balshofer – short film
- Red Wing's Loyalty, directed by Fred J. Balshofer – short film
- Rivalry in the Oil Fields, directed by Fred J. Balshofer – short film
- Red Wing's Constancy, directed by Fred J. Balshofer – short film
- A Husband's Mistake, directed by Fred J. Balshofer – short film
- The Adventures of a Cowpuncher, directed by Fred J. Balshofer – short film
- Rattlesnakes, directed by Fred J. Balshofer – short film
- Hazel, the Heart Breaker, directed by Fred J. Balshofer – short film
- The Rescue of the Pioneer's Daughter, directed by Fred J. Balshofer - short film
- A Sister's Devotion, directed by Fred J. Balshofer - short film
- Love and Money, directed by Fred J. Balshofer – short film
- Cupid's Comedy
- Lost for Many Years
- The Feud, directed by Fred J. Balshofer – short film
- The Curse of Gambling, directed by Fred J. Balshofer – short film
- Perils of the Plains, directed by Fred J. Balshofer – short film
- The Tie That Binds, directed by Fred J. Balshofer – short film
- Married on Horseback, directed by Fred J. Balshofer – short film
- Girls, directed by Fred J. Balshofer - short film
- Saved from the Redmen, directed by Fred J. Balshofer - short film
- An Engineer's Sweetheart, directed by Fred J. Balshofer - short film
- A Cowboy's Race for a Wife
- The Sea Wolves, directed by Fred J. Balshofer – short film
- A Mexican Lothario
- Her Terrible Peril
- A Ranchman's Simple Son
- A Sinner's Sacrifice
- The Sheriff of Black Gulch
- A Mexican Love Affair
- Red Fern and the Kid
- A Message of the Sea
- Black Pete's Reformation
- Love in Mexico
- In the Wild West, directed by Fred J. Balshofer - short film
- A Miner's Sweetheart
- A Cowboy's Generosity
- A True Country Heart
- The Prairie Post Mistress
- A Woman's Better Nature
- The Redmen's Persecution
- The Mascot of Company D
- Kit Carson, directed by Fred J. Balshofer - short film
- Dan, the Arizona Scout, directed by Fred J. Balshofer – short film
- The Night Rustlers, directed by Fred J. Balshofer – short film
- Western Justice, Fred J. Balshofer – short film
- A True Indian Brave, directed by Fred J. Balshofer – short film
- A Cowboy's Matrimonial Tangle, directed by Fred J. Balshofer – short film
- For a Western Girl, directed by Fred J. Balshofer – short film
- For the Love of Red Wing, directed by Fred J. Balshofer - short film
- A Cattle Rustler's Daughter
- A Cowboy for Love
- The Ranch Raiders
- Young Deer's Return
- The Girl Scout
- A Cowboy's Daring Rescue
- The Prayer of a Miner's Child
- The Lure of Gold
- The Wrong Trail
- The Girl Cowboy, directed by Fred J. Balshofer - short film
- A Red Girl's Friendship, directed by Fred J. Balshofer - short film
- The Fatal Gold Nugget, directed by Fred J. Balshofer - short film
- Red Wing and the White Girl, directed by Fred J. Balshofer – short film
- The Branded Man, directed by Fred J. Balshofer – short film
- Bud's Triumph, directed by Fred J. Balshofer – short film
- The Flight of Red Wing, directed by Fred J. Balshofer – short film
- An Indian Maiden's Choice, directed by Fred J. Balshofer – short film
- True Western Honor, directed by Fred J. Balshofer – short film
- A Cheyenne's Love for a Sioux, directed by Fred J. Balshofer – short film
- The Ranchman's Personal, directed by Fred J. Balshofer – short film
- A Child of the Wild
- A Sioux's Reward
- A Brave Western Girl
- An Indian's Test
- A Girl of the Plains
- The Cattle Baron's Daughter
- The Pale Faced Princess
- An Indian's Elopement, directed by Fred J. Balshofer – short film
- Taming the Terror

=== 1911 ===
- In the Heart of the Sierras
- The Savage Girl's Devotion, directed by Fred J. Balshofer - short film
- An Indian Trapper's Prize
- The Creek Claim
- Texas Ted's Defense
- The Redskin's Secret
- The Red Man's Wrath
- Trials of Bud Brown
- A Tough Tenderfoot
- A Squaw's Bravery
- The Salted Mine
- A Deputy's Honor
- A Warrior's Squaw
- The Way of a Red Man
- Fate of Joe Dorr
- A Warrior's Faith
- Owanee's Great Love
- Dick Farrell's Prize
- Her Prisoner
- Starlight the Squaw
- Sacrifice of Silver Cloud
- Was He Justified?
- The Cowboy's Waif
- An Indian Nemesis – short film
- The Red Avenger
- At Bar C Ranch
- Avery's Dream
- Indian's Mistake
- A Man of Honor
- Return of Company 'D'
- A Cowboy for a Day
- An Indian's Ambition
- A Red Man's Gratitude
- Shifty's Claim
- The Knight of the Trail
- Crow's Defeat
- The Foreman's Bride
- The Broncho Buster's Rival – short film
- The Cheyenne Medicine Man
- The Outlaw and the Female Detective
- Brave Swift Eagle's Peril
- A Redskin's Bravery
- A Tale of the Foothills
- His Lordship's Hunting Trip
- A Child of the Rancho
- A Squaw's Retribution
- The Desert's Lure
- The Dude Cowboy
- The Foreman's Mine
- An Indian's Love
- Cowboy's Vacation
- The Unloaded Gun
- Blacksnake's Treachery
- A Red Girl's Heart
- Generous Cowboys
- Her Captive
- A Cheyenne's Courtship
- Silver Wing's Dream
- The Tables Turned
- A True-Hearted Miner
- Darkfeather, the Squaw
- Grey Cloud's Devotion
- The New Cowboy
- A Sioux Spy
- An Indian Love Story, directed by Fred J. Balshofer
- A Cowboy's Loyalty
- Pioneer Days
- An Indian Legend
- The Sheriff's Love
- Little Dove's Romance
- The Lost Letter
- Lone Star's Return
- The Sheriff's Brother – short film
- The Missionary's Gratitude
- Lucky Bob
- White Fawn's Peril
- The Red Man's Penalty
- Range Justice
- The Indian Rustlers
- The Pioneer's Mistake
- A Western Bride
- A Warrior's Treachery
- A Noble Red Man
- An Indian Hero
- The Cattlemen's War
- A Young Squaw's Bravery
- A Race for a Bride
- Wenoma's Broken Promise
- The Winning of Wonega
- The Ranchman's Mother-in-Law
- The Broken Trap
- White Fawn's Escape
- A Bad Man
- A Western One-Night Stand
- An Easterner's Peril
- The Empty Tepee
- A Range Romance
- Bar Z's New Cook
- The Foreman's Courage
- Cowgirls' Pranks
- An Indian Martyr
- Falsely Accused, directed by Thomas H. Ince – short film
- Getting His Man, directed by Thomas H. Ince – short film

=== 1912 ===
- A Mexican Tragedy, directed by Thomas H. Ince – short film
- Chinese Smugglers, directed by Thomas H. Ince – short film
- The Indian Maid's Elopement, directed by Thomas H. Ince – short film
- The Gambler's Heart, directed by Thomas H. Ince – short film
- The Laugh on Dad, directed by Thomas H. Ince – short film
- The Honor of the Tribe, directed by Thomas H. Ince – short film
- The Run on the Bank, directed by Thomas H. Ince – short film
- The Sub-Chief's Choice, directed by Thomas H. Ince – short film
- The Ranch Girl's Love, directed by Thomas H. Ince – short film
- Love and Jealousy, directed by Thomas H. Ince – short film
- The Empty Water Keg, directed by Thomas H. Ince
- The Protection of the Cross
- A Tenderfoot's Revenge
- Broncho Bill's Love Affair
- The Wild West Circus
- The Deputy's Sweetheart, directed by Thomas H. Ince
- War on the Plains, directed by Thomas H. Ince – short film
- The Heart of an Indian
- The Battle of the Red Men
- The Deserter, directed by Thomas H. Ince
- The Crisis, directed by Thomas H. Ince
- Blazing the Trail, directed by Thomas H. Ince
- The Post Telegrapher, directed by Thomas H. Ince and Francis Ford – short film
- The Lieutenant's Last Fight
- The Outcast, directed by Thomas H. Ince
- Memories of a Pioneer
- A Soldier's Honor
- His Punishment
- On the Warpath, directed by Reginald Barker
- His Message, directed by Thomas H. Ince
- The Colonel's Peril
- The Sheriff of Stoney Butte
- The Restoration, directed by Fred J. Balshofer
- Reconciled
- Just in Time
- The Sheriff's Mysterious Aide
- Daredevil Dick Wins a Wife
- The Little Rancher
- The White Savior
- An Even Break
- His Partner's Share
- A Western Girl's Dream
- Her First Choice
- The Widow's Claim
- The Shot That Failed
- How He Made Good
- For Love, Life and Riches, directed by Frank Montgomery
- A Shot in the Dark, directed by Ben F. Wilson
- The Arizona Land Swindle
- Her Last Resort
- A White Indian
- The Girl from Golden Run
- The Ranchman's Awakening
- The Massacre of Santa Fe Trail, directed by Frank E. Montgomery
- The Sheriff's Reward
- At Old Fort Dearborn; or, Chicago in 1812
- A Western Episode
- When Uncle Sam Was Young
- The Indian Raiders, directed by Tom Ricketts
- The Tattoo
- Star Eyes' Stratagem, directed by Frank E. Montgomery
- Early Days in the West
- Hunted Down
- A Daughter of the Redskins
- The Cowboy Guardians
- Trapper Bill, King of Scouts
- A Red Man's Love Frank E. Montgomery
- An Indian Ishmael
- A Blackfoot Conspiracy
- The Tribal Law, directed by Wallace Reid and Otis Turner
- Trapped by Fire
- The Half-Breed Scout
- An Indian Outcast
- The Massacre of the Fourth Cavalry
- Big Rock's Last Stand
- The Rights of a Savage
- A Four-Footed Hero
- A Ride for Life
- Before the White Man Came
- Indian Dances and Pastimes
- Heroine of the Plains
- El Capitan and the Land Grabbers
- The Redemption of White Hawk

=== 1913 ===
- A Girl at War
- The Romance of the Utah Pioneers, directed by Charles Farley – short film
- An Apache Father's Vengeance, directed by Frank Montgomery
- A Frontier Providence, directed by Otis Turner
- Regimental Pals
- The Genius of Fort Lapawai
- A Gambler's Last Trick
- Sheridan's Ride, directed by Otis Turner – short film
- Cowboy Sports and Pastimes
- Mona of the Modocs, directed by Frank Montgomery
- A Frontier Mystery
- On the Frontier
- In the Redman's Country
- The Song of the Telegraph, directed by Frank Montgomery
- The Bugler of Company B – short film
- The Coward's Atonement, directed by Francis Ford – short film
- The Red Girl's Sacrifice, directed by Frank Montgomery
- His Brother, directed by Francis Ford
- At Mad Mole Canyon
- The Flaming Arrow
- Indian Blood
- The Battle of Bull Run, directed by Francis Ford
- The Return of Thunder Cloud's Spirit, directed by Henry MacRae
- The Light in the Window, directed by Francis Ford
- The Half Breed Parson, directed by Francis Ford
- A House Divided
- Taps, directed by Francis Ford
- Bedford's Hope
- The Darling of the Regiment, directed by Francis Ford
- War, directed by Francis Ford
- Bred in the Bone, directed by Wilfred Lucas
- The Last Roll Call
- The Vengeance of the Skystone, directed by Henry MacRae
- The Indian's Secret
- The Northern Spy
- The Toll of War, directed by Francis Ford
- In the Secret Service, directed by Henry MacRae
- The Stars and Stripes Forever, directed by Francis Ford
- Under Fire
- Love, Life and Liberty, directed by Henry MacRae
- The Honor of the Regiment, directed by Wilfred Lucas
- The Battle of San Juan Hill, directed by Francis Ford – short film
- The Spirit of the Flag, directed by Allan Dwan – short film
- The Grand Old Flag, directed by Henry MacRae – short film
- The Capture of Aguinaldo, directed by Francis Ford – short film
- In Love and War, directed by Allan Dwan and Thomas H. Ince – short film
- Women and War, directed by Allan Dwan – short film
- The Guerilla Menace
- The Battle of Manila, directed by Francis Ford – short film
- At Shiloh – short film
- The Powder Flash of Death, directed by Allan Dwan – short film
- The Head Hunters – short film
- The Picket Guard, directed by Allan Dwan – short film
- When Sherman Marched to the Sea, directed by Jack Conway
- The Lawbreakers
- Robinson Crusoe, directed by Otis Turner
- The Cave Dwellers' Romance
- The Death Stone of India, directed by Milton J. Fahrney – short film
- The Snake, directed by Frank Montgomery
- Campaigning with Custer
- Soldiers Three
- The Iron Trail, directed by Henry MacRae
- The Mystery of Yellow Aster Mine, directed by Frank Borzage
- The Gratitude of Wanda, directed by Wallace Reid
- Pelleas and Melisande, directed by J. Farrell MacDonald
- The Love of Men, directed by Frank Montgomery
- A Forest Romance, directed by Frank Montgomery
- Wandering Folk, directed by Otis Turner
- In the Coils of the Python, directed by Henry MacRae
- Through the Window
- The Struggle, directed by Jack Conway and Frank Montgomery
- Captain Billie's Mate, directed by Francis Ford
- Shon the Piper, directed by Otis Turner
- Good-for-Nothing Jack
- The Girl and the Tiger, directed by Henry MacRae
- Fighters of the Plains
- In the Wilds of Africa
- Through Barriers of Fire, directed by Edwin August
- The She Wolf, directed by Francis Ford
- The Cowboy Magnate
- The Black Masks, directed by Grace Cunard and Francis Ford
- From Dawn Till Dark, directed by Francis Ford
- Captain Kidd, directed by Otis Turner
- The Prairie Trail
- The Madonna of the Slums, directed by Francis Ford
- Lasca
- The Raid of the Human Tigers
- Wynona's Vengeance, directed by Francis Ford
- The White Vaquero, directed by Francis Ford
- War of the Cattle Range, directed by Henry MacRae
- The White Squaw, directed by Henry MacRae – short film
- The Werewolf, directed by Henry MacRae – short film
- The God of Girzah
- The Water War, directed by Henry MacRae

=== 1914 ===
- The Gambler's Oath
- The Eleventh Hour, directed by Henry MacRae (1914)
- The Flash of Fate, directed by Henry MacRae (1914)
- For the Freedom of Cuba
- The Mad Hermit, directed by Francis Ford (1914)
- The Vagabond Soldier
- Unjustly Accused
- Her Father's Guilt
- The Legion of the Phantom Tribe
- The Yaqui's Revenge
- From the Lion's Jaws
- In the Wolves' Fangs
- Two Little Waifs
- The Lamb, the Woman, the Wolf
- Dangers of the Veldt
- Dolores D'Arada, Lady of Sorrow
- Old California
- The Tragedy of Whispering Creek
- A Nation's Peril (1914)
- The Hills of Silence
- The Triumph of Mind, directed by Lois Weber (1914)
- Cast Adrift in the South Seas
- On the Verge of War
- Isle of Abandoned Hope
- The Forbidden Room, directed by Allan Dwan (1914)
- The Old Cobbler
- The Hopes of Blind Alley
- Prowlers of the Wild
- A Mexican Spy in America
- Olana of the South Seas
- Tribal War in the South Seas
- Rescued by Wireless, directed by Henry MacRae – short film (1914)
- The Oubliette, directed by Charles Giblyn – short film (1914)
- The Lure of the Geisha
- The Law of the Lumberjack
- The Return of the Twins' Double
- Our Enemy's Spy
- The Higher Law, directed by Charles Giblyn – short film (1914)
- Richelieu, directed by Allan Dwan – mediometraggio (1914)
- Love and Baseball
- The Phantom Light
- Monsieur Bluebeard
- The Mysterious Hand
- A Redskin Reckoning
- A Daughter of the Redskins
- The Jungle Master
- The Silent Peril
- Ninety Black Boxes
- The Brand of His Tribe
- The Foundlings of Father Time
- The Trail Breakers
- The Christmas Spirit, directed by Murdock MacQuarrie (1914)
- The Law of the Range, directed by Henry MacRae (1914)

=== 1915 ===
- In the Jungle Wilds
- Custer's Last Scout
- The Governor Maker, directed by Henry MacRae (1915)
- Old Peg Leg's Will
- The Mystery Woman
- Ridgeway of Montana
- Terrors of the Jungle, directed by Henry MacRae (1915)
- Tre briganti e una ragazza
- The Curse of the Desert
- The Lost Ledge
- Diana of Eagle Mountain
- The Mother Instinct, directed by Wilfred Lucas (1915)
- La città nascosta (The Hidden City), directed by Francis Ford (1915)
- The Oaklawn Handicap
- Betty and the Boys
- And They Called Him Hero
- La porta della distruzione
- The War of the Wild
- Nabbed
- The Blood of His Brother
- The Jungle Queen
- The Smuggler's Lass
- The Circus Girl's Romance
- One Man's Evil
- Lone Larry
- The Test of a Man
- Jane's Declaration of Independence
- The Ulster Lass
- The Toll of the Sea, directed by Henry MacRae – short film (1915)
- The Mad Maid of the Forest
- A Daughter of the Jungles
- Gene of the Northland
- Chasing the Limited
- The Gopher
- The Social Lion
- Coral
- In the Sunset Country
- The Surrender
- A Message for Help
- The Ghost Wagon
- The Queen of Jungle Land
- The Yellow Star
- A Fight to a Finish
- The Superior Claim
- The Mettle of Jerry McGuire
- What the River Foretold
- The Heart of a Tigress
- A Desperate Leap
- The Connecting Link
- The Lion's Ward
- His Real Character
- When Rogues Fall Out, directed by J.P. McGowan

=== 1916 ===
- The Dawn Road
- On the Trail of the Tigress
- Across the Rio Grande, directed by George Marshall (1916)
- Buck Simmons, Puncher
- A Daughter of Penance
- The Phantom Island
- His Majesty Dick Turpin
- A Recoiling Vengeance
- Stampede in the Night
- The One Woman, directed by Henry Otto (1916)
- The Quarter Breed
- The Iron Rivals
- Behind the Curtain, directed by Henry Otto (1916)
- The Night Riders
- Behind the Mask, directed by Francis Ford (1916)
- The Rival Pilots
- The Passing of Hell's Crown
- The Torrent of Vengeance
- The Leap
- A Fight for Love
- Hulda the Silent
- The Wedding Guest, directed by Jacques Jaccard – short film (1916)
- Tammany's Tiger
- The Cage Man
- A Railroad Bandit
- The Ghost of the Jungle
- The Money Lenders
- The Committee on Credentials
- The Human Pendulum
- Midwinter Madness
- For the Love of a Girl, directed by Harry Carey (1916)
- Under the Lion's Paw
- A Jungle Hero
- Along the Malibu, directed by Cleo Madison and William V. Mong – short film (1916)
- Beyond the Trail, directed by Ben F. Wilson – short film (1916)
- The Trail of Chance, directed by Lucius Henderson – short film (1916)
- The Desert Rat, directed by Romaine Fielding – short film (1916)
- The Princely Bandit
- A Mountain Tragedy, directed by George Cochrane – short film (1916)
- Night Shadows
- The Conspiracy
- The Better Man, directed by Jay Hunt (1916)
- For Love and Gold
- The Quitter, directed by Burton George – short film (1916)
- The Son of a Rebel Chief
- The Lost Lode
- The Telegraph Operator's Daughter
- The Greater Power
- The Good Woman
- The Taint of Fear
- Fighting Joe
- Giant Powder

=== 1917 ===
- Blood Money, directed by Fred Kelsey – short film (1917)
- The Bad Man of Cheyenne, directed by Fred Kelsey (1917)
- Brute Force, directed by A.W. Rice (1917)
- The Daring Chance, directed by William V. Mong (1917)
- The Boonton Affair, directed by King Baggot (1917)
- The Outlaw and the Lady, directed by Fred Kelsey – short film (1917)
- John Osborne's Triumph, directed by Murdock MacQuarrie (1917)
- The Comeback, directed by George Marshall (1917)
- Il tornado (The Tornado), directed by John Ford – short film (1917)
- The Drifter, directed by Fred Kelsey (1917)
- Roped In, directed by George Marshall (1917)
- Goin' Straight
- Steel Hearts
- Burning Silence
- Burning Silence
- The Kidnapped Bride, directed by Henry MacRae (1917)
- The Tell Tale Clue
- La pista dell'odio
- The Little Moccasins
- One Wild Night, directed by Henry MacRae (1917)
- Casey's Border Raid
- Dropped from the Clouds, directed by Henry MacRae (1917)
- Number 10, Westbound
- L'attaccabrighe (The Scrapper), directed by John Ford – short film (1917)
- The Honor of Men
- Money and Mystery
- The Wrong Man, directed by Fred Kelsey
- Double Suspicion
- Il pastore di anime (The Soul Herder), directed by John Ford – short film (1917)
- Squaring It
- Jungle Treachery
- The Lure of the Circus, directed by William B. Pearson (1917)
- The Texas Sphinx
- The Last of the Night Riders
- The Dynamite Special
- The Lion's Lair
- Saving the Fast Mail
- The Temple of Terror
- The Getaway, directed by George Cochrane (1917)
- Danger Ahead

== Bibliography ==
- Fleming, E.J. (October 25, 2013). Wallace Reid: The Life and Death of a Hollywood Idol. McFarland Publishing. pp. 242–244. ISBN 9780786477258.
