= Bassett Unified School District =

School district in California, United States

Address
- 904 Willow Ave La Puente, Los Angeles County, California, 91746-1615; United States

District information
- Type: Public
- Motto: Traditionally: "Excellence in Education." Officially: "Students First. De Facto: Educate, Engage, Empower!"
- Grades: KG–12, including Child Development and Adult Education
- Established: 1898; 128 years ago
- Superintendent: Alejandro Álvarez
- School board: Aaron Simental, President. Patrice Stanzione, Vice President. Norma Gonzalez, Clerk. Dolores Rivera, Member. Dena Florez, Member.
- Accreditations: Western Association of Schools and Colleges
- Schools: 7; Bassett Senior High, Don Julian Elementary, Edgewood Academy, J. E. Van Wig Elementary, Nueva Vista Continuation High, Sunkist Elementary, Torch Middle
- Budget: $60 million
- NCES District ID: 0604110
- District ID: CA-1964295

Students and staff
- Students: 2,946
- Teachers: 130.72 (on an FTE basis)
- Staff: 185.77 (on an FTE basis)
- Student–teacher ratio: 22.54:1
- Colors: Light Blue and Brown

Other information
- Website: www.bassettusd.org

The Bassett Unified School District is a California public unified school district based in the La Puente Valley of the eastern region of the San Gabriel Valley in Los Angeles County, California, United States.

== History ==
The district itself, its first school, and its only high school are named after Oscar T. Bassett of El Paso, Texas. It was part of Bassett Township in the late 19th century, belonging to John A. Rowland and William H. Workman. Bassett Township was part of Rancho La Puente, a land grant from the then Alta California Governor Pío Pico. This rancho was composed of many farms, fields, and groves, predominantly walnuts, citruses, avocados, and grapes. The land was sold to many individuals, creating the neighboring cities around the area. The district was supervised by a three-member board of trustees and had no more than three schools. By the 1960s, Bassett Unified School District became a larger academic entity; however, for safety reasons, some of the first buildings were destroyed, and the property was sold. By the 1980s, all campuses/ school sites there today existed. In 1998, the small district celebrated its centennial. The district is located in Bassett and portions of West Puente Valley, and Avocado Heights and portions of La Puente, Baldwin Park, West Covina and the City of Industry.

== Governance ==
A five-member board of education governs the district. The incumbent members of the Board of Education are Armando Barajas (President), Paul Solano (Vice President), Patrice Stanzione (Clerk), Dolores Rivera, and Dena Florez. The board has one non-voting student member from the district's high school who represents the district's whole student body.

The board meets monthly per California law. The qualified voters of the district elect members of the board for a term of four years. There are no imposed term limits on board membership. Members of the board receive a no-obligation salary below $300. The district is a member of many other educational/ governmental organizations throughout the region/ state/ nation and regularly appoints Board members as delegates to those organizations.

The board has the duties of managing the district schools, funds, and personnel as well as the power to hire/ fire said personnel, order elections to fill any vacancy (or appoint), and name a district superintendent of schools and other high-ranking administrators who form their cabinet. The former Deputy Superintendent was Antoine Hawkins. These senior executive administrative officers make up the core superintendent's cabinet.

=== Taxes and employment ===
The district is currently assessing or levying property taxes upon all real property in the district according to three obligation bonds approved by district voters in recent years. These obligation bonds are consistent with California law, and all funds collected are for local usage and supervised by a citizen's bond oversight committee of seven members. There are two such committees: a Measure E committee (currently composed of four persons and renewed once in consequence of Measure E being re-approved) and a Measure 'V' committee (yet to be called). The district has a Personnel Commission of three persons, with John Muraki as its director. The commission is tasked with providing employment-related recommendations to the district superintendent, who presents them to the Board of Education to consider the commission's recommendations.

==== Measure V ====
Bassett USD Schools Safety, College/Career Readiness Measure V was on the November 4, 2014, election ballot for voters in the Bassett Unified School District in Los Angeles County, California. A 55 percent supermajority vote was required for the approval of this measure. It was approved by 62.42%.

Measure V authorized the district to increase its debt by $30 million by issuing general obligation bonds in that amount to fund significant renovations, repairs, and upgrades to classrooms and schools throughout the district. Homeowners would be taxed $60 per $100,000 of assessed property value annually.

The school recognized the need to redesign the district's classrooms and technology infrastructure. Measure V laid the foundation for technology innovation in Bassett Unified School District, which is now recognized for its use of technology and has launched a successful podcast called TOSAs Talking Tech and a 1:1 student device initiative.

=== Associations ===
The Bassett Teachers Association (B.T.A.) and the California School Employees Association (C.S.E.A.) are the two significant associations in the district.

== Campus ==
The district has one comprehensive senior high school (9–12), a continuation high school (10–12), an adult education program, a child-development program, three elementary schools (K–5), one academy (K–8) and a middle school (6–8) (which is also a California Distinguished school). The district also owns two other program-using campuses, Erwin and Flanner. The district's first campus was Bassett Elementary, which was closed down and is now part of the lands composing a private community on the corner of Temple and Vineland avenues. It was adjacent to Bassett Park, operated by Los Angeles County. Nearby religious/ private high school Bishop Amat Memorial High School is not used by the district but is under the authority of the Roman Catholic Archdiocese of Los Angeles.

== Media ==
- Graduation Rates
- Special Education
- Special Education
- Technology
- Technology
- Test Scores
- Film Academy
