= A Forest Romance =

1913 film directed by Frank Montgomery

- Directed by: Frank Montgomery
- Produced by: Bison Film Company
- Starring: Harry von Meter; Mona Darkfeather
- Distributed by: Universal Film Manufacturing Company
- Release date: September 9, 1913
- Country: United States
- Languages: Silent; English intertitles

A Forest Romance is a 1913 American silent short Western film directed by Frank Montgomery and starring Harry von Meter and Mona Darkfeather.

== Cast ==
- Mona Darkfeather
- Harry von Meter
- James Davis
- Arthur Ortego
- Harry Schumm
- Jack Messick as Rowland
