= Justice of the Wild =

- Directed by: Frank E. Montgomery
- Produced by: David Horsley
- Starring: Harry von Meter; Mona Darkfeather; Jack Messick
- Distributed by: Universal Film Manufacturing Company
- Release date: September 29, 1913
- Country: United States
- Languages: Silent film English intertitles

Justice of the Wild is a 1913 American silent short adventure film directed by Frank E. Montgomery starring Harry Van Meter, Mona Darkfeather, and Jack Messick.

== Plot ==
This plot summary was published in The Moving Picture World for September 27, 1915:

A two-reel offering, telling a rather new Western story. 'Mona marries the cattle rustler and becomes a mother to his son by a previous marriage. Later her husband joins in the robbery of the chief, who is murdered in the attack. Mona learns that her husband is implicated and she shoots him as he is ■drinking from the stream. The picture closes with her holding the boy in her arms. A grim tale of frontier life, which holds the attention quite strongly,

This plot summary appeared in The Bioscope, February 26, 1914:

Marriage with an Indian girl gives happiness to a widower, but he falls into evil ways, and one day steals the money of an Indian chief. The wife recognises the bag as that of her own tribe, and ruthlessly shoots her husband dead.

== Cast ==
- Mona Darkfeather as Mona
- Harry Van Meter as Joe
- Jack Messick as Indian Chief
- L.J Anderson as The Kid
