= Lionel Manuel =

American football player (born 1962)

No. 86, 80
- Position: Wide receiver

Personal information
- Born: April 13, 1962 (age 64); Los Angeles, California, U.S.
- Listed height: 5 ft 11 in (1.80 m)
- Listed weight: 178 lb (81 kg)

Career information
- High school: Bassett (La Puente, California)
- College: Pacific
- NFL draft: 1984: 7th round, 171st overall pick

Career history
- New York Giants (1984–1990); Buffalo Bills (1991)*; Barcelona Dragons (1992)*
- * Offseason or practice squad member only

Awards and highlights
- Super Bowl champion (XXI)

Career NFL statistics
- Receptions: 232
- Receiving yards: 3,941
- Receiving touchdowns: 23
- Stats at Pro Football Reference

Lionel Manuel Jr. (born April 13, 1962) is an American former professional football player who was a wide receiver in the National Football League (NFL). He played college football for the Pacific Tigers. Manuel was selected in the seventh round (171st pick overall) of the 1984 NFL draft by the New York Giants, and played seven seasons in the NFL.

== Early life ==
Manuel was born in Los Angeles, California and attended Bassett High School. He played college football at Citrus College before transferring to the University of the Pacific where he played wide receiver and running back for the Pacific Tigers.

== Professional career ==
The 5'11", 180 lb wide receiver was selected in the seventh round of the 1984 NFL draft by the New York Giants, and played in seven NFL seasons. Manuel spent his entire career with the Giants (1984–1990), including the XXI Giants Super Bowl Team when they beat the Denver Broncos 39–20. His peak performance was during the 1988 season, when he caught 65 passes for 1,029 yards and scored four touchdowns.

Manuel's career ended after several injuries in the 1990 season when he played under head coach Bill Parcells. The Giants finished the 1990 season 13–3, and won the Super Bowl XXV against the Buffalo Bills 20–19. Parcells waived Manuel in December 1990, citing Manuel's poor attitude after losing his starting position. Manuel then signed with the Buffalo Bills as a free agent but was waived due to injuries and did not play for the team. Manuel played European football with the Barcelona Dragons before retiring in 1993.

== NFL career statistics ==
Legend
	Won the Super Bowl
**Bold**	Career high

=== Regular season ===
Year	Team	Games		Receiving				
Year	Team	GP	GS	Rec	Yds	Avg	Lng	TD
1984	NYG	**16**	5	33	619	**18.8**	**53**	4
1985	NYG	12	12	49	859	17.5	51	5
1986	NYG	4	4	11	181	16.5	35	3
1987	NYG	12	12	30	545	18.2	50	**6**
1988	NYG	**16**	**16**	**65**	**1,029**	15.8	46	4
1989	NYG	**16**	12	33	539	16.3	49	1
1990	NYG	14	0	11	169	15.4	19	0
Total		90	61	232	3,941	17.0	53	23

=== Playoffs ===
Year	Team	Games		Receiving				
Year	Team	GP	GS	Rec	Yds	Avg	Lng	TD
1984	NYG	2	1	**5**	**84**	16.8	**25**	0
1985	NYG	2	**2**	3	56	18.7	21	0
1986	NYG	**3**	1	**5**	79	15.8	**25**	**1**
1989	NYG	1	1	1	24	**24.0**	24	0
Total		8	5	14	243	17.4	25	1

== Life after the NFL ==
Manuel went on to coach several college football teams including The LaVerne Leopards, and later became a professional chef and restaurateur after attending the Scottsdale Culinary Institute. Manuel worked as a high school varsity coach in Fontana, California. Manuel was inducted into the University of the Pacific Hall of Fame in 2012.
