= The Mysterious Rose =

1914 American short film directed by Francis Ford

- Directed by: Francis Ford
- Written by: Grace Cunard
- Production company: Universal Gold Seal
- Distributed by: Universal Film Manufacturing Company
- Release date: November 24, 1914 (U.S.)
- Running time: 20 min
- Country: United States

The Mysterious Rose is a 1914 American silent film directed by Francis Ford and written by Grace Cunard.

== Cast ==
- Grace Cunard as Lady Raffles
- Francis Ford as Detective Phil Kelly
- Jack Ford as Dopey
- Harry Schumm as District Attorney's Son
- Wilbur Higby as Ward Boss
- Eddie Boland as Yeen Kee
