= The Path She Chose =

1920 silent film directed by Phil Rosen

- Directed by: Phil Rosen
- Written by: Doris Schroeder
- Based on: the short story, "Virginia" by Ida M. Evans
- Starring: Anne Cornwall; J. Farrell MacDonald; Claire Anderson
- Cinematography: Harold James
- Production company: Universal Film
- Release date: May 24, 1920 (US)
- Running time: 5 reels
- Country: United States
- Language: English

The Path She Chose is a 1920 American silent drama film, directed by Phil Rosen. It stars Anne Cornwall, J. Farrell MacDonald, and Claire Anderson, and was released on May 24, 1920.

== Cast ==
- Anne Cornwall as Virginia
- J. Farrell MacDonald as Father
- Claire Anderson as Sister
- Genevieve Blinn as Forewoman
- Dagmar Godowsky as Marie
- Kathleen O'Connor as Tess
- Edward Coxen as Parker
- William Moran as Frank
- Harry Schumm as Client
