= A Redskin's Bravery =

1911 film

- Produced by: Bison Motion Pictures Company; New York Motion Picture Company
- Distributed by: Motion Picture Distributors and Sales Company
- Release date: 1911
- Running time: 1 reel
- Country: United States
- Languages: Silent; English intertitles

A Redskin's Bravery is a 1911 American short silent Western film produced by the Bison Motion Pictures and New York Motion Picture Company. It was distributed by the Motion Picture Distributors and Sales Company.

This film is preserved in the Library of Congress collection.

== Themes ==
A Redskin's Bravery is an example of how Bison films were often faulted for trite stories and carelessly staged action. It is also an example of a trend in the early 1900s to portray Native Americans as "the noble savage".
