= Clyde Beck =

American baseball player (1900–1988)

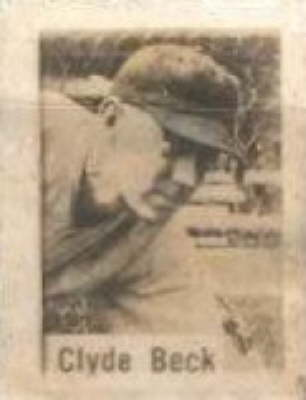
- Infielder
- Born: January 6, 1900; Bassett, California, U.S.
- Died: July 15, 1988 (aged 88); Temple City, California, U.S.
- Batted: Right Threw: Right

MLB debut
- May 19, 1926, for the Chicago Cubs

Last MLB appearance
- September 11, 1931, for the Cincinnati Reds

MLB statistics
- Batting average: .232
- Home runs: 12
- Runs batted in: 162
- Stats at Baseball Reference

Teams
- Chicago Cubs (1926–1930); Cincinnati Reds (1931)

Clyde Eugene "Jersey" Beck (January 6, 1900 – July 15, 1988) was an American right-handed infielder in Major League Baseball for the Chicago Cubs and Cincinnati Reds from 1926 to 1931.

Beck spent the first five seasons of his career with the Cubs. After making his major league debut on May 19, 1926, Beck was used as a reserve second baseman for the Cubs, playing in 30 games and finishing with a .198 batting average, only one extra-base hit (a home run), and 4 RBI. The next season, he was in the Cubs' lineup more often than not, playing in 117 games. He saw some time at third base and shortstop as well as his familiar second base position. His .258 average would prove to be the best of his career, as would his tally of doubles (20) and triples (5).

During the 1928 campaign, Beck saw considerably more time at third base (87 games) and shortstop (47 games) than second base (1 game). Freddie Maguire had become the everyday second sacker, but Beck had certainly become an infield fixture for the Cubs. He posted career highs in at-bats, runs, hits, and RBI, batting a solid .257 as Chicago fell just four wins short of first place and a trip to the World Series. In 1929, Rogers Hornsby, Norm McMillan and Woody English proved to be a dependable trio of infielders for the club and Beck was again relegated to backup status. He played in just 54 games and batted only .211, collecting a mere seven extra-base hits all year, all of them doubles. Though the Cubs made the World Series after the season, Beck did not appear in any of the Series' five games as the Philadelphia Athletics won four games to one.

Beck saw some increased playing time in 1930; in fact, he played more games at shortstop than any Cub except English, who split his time almost evenly between shortstop and third base. He also saw somewhat of a power surge, hitting a career-high six home runs in 244 at-bats. In fact, that matched the total number of home runs he'd hit in 1,145 at-bats over his first four seasons. However, his batting average was again low at .213, and the Cubs put Beck on waivers after the season ended.

Claimed by the Cincinnati Reds for 1931, Beck found himself as a backup third baseman and occasional shortstop, and his numbers plummeted. He managed to hit just .154 in 53 games and played his last game in the majors on September 11, 1931.

Beck died on July 15, 1988, in Temple City, California. He was 88 years old.
