= West Is Best =

1920 film

- Directed by: Phil Rosen
- Written by: Gwendolyn Logan; Harvey Gates; Philip Hubbard
- Starring: Hoot Gibson
- Production company: Universal Film Manufacturing Company
- Distributed by: Universal Film Manufacturing Company
- Release date: January 17, 1920
- Running time: 20 minutes
- Country: United States
- Languages: Silent; English intertitles

West Is Best is a 1920 American short silent Western film directed by Phil Rosen and featuring Hoot Gibson.

== Plot ==
This plot summary comes from the original Library of Congress copyright filing:

Old man Craven, of Red Gulch County, had two sons. He send Beverly east to be made into a gentleman, but Beverly went from Yale to New York and became a first-class lounge-lizzard. Tom, the younger, had steadily refused to be sent east. He was a gentleman of the ranges and as such was known and respected by Red Gulch and the neighboring counties.

When old man Craven died suddenly it was found that he had left his money to be divided between his sons, but that Harmony Ranch and the cattle had been left to Beverly, the elder. When Beverly received Tom's telegram he was entertaining a bunch of lovely ladies from the Cocoanut Grove. He conceived the idea of taking the ladies with him to view the West. All were willing except Susie de Larue who was a western girl. She loved the West but didn't want to go there. However, with persuasion she went.

When the party arrived the girls were escorted to the bunkhouse by the [Chinese man]. The girls found the bunkhouse full of half-dressed cowboys. The girls were annoyed but Tom arrived and rectified the error and the fun began. Tom fell for Susie hard, and had no idea of ever letting her go East again unless as his wife. So he fixed it with Bud Thomas to have a make-believe hold up, frighten the lives out of Beverly and his bunch and kidnap Susie until the others had fled Eastward.

It chanced that Ten-Spot Joe, a local badman, arranged a real holdup with his pal, Mike the Rat for the same night. Mike held up the saloon and with it Bud Thomas while Ten-Spot went to the ranch house and held up the bunch. Tom was waiting for Bud and he mistook Ten-Spot for Bud, so he helped with the holdup and was tickled when Ten-Spot abducted Susie and rode off with her. Tom followed to the saloon, expecting to find Bud and Susie. He found instead, Bud and Mike the Rat each covering the other. Then it dawned on Tom that he had helped the worst blackguard outside jail to run off with his girl. He made Mike the Rat guide him to Ten-Spot's cabin and by luck he got there in time. Susie agreed to stay West and be Mrs. Tom — and Beverly and his Cocoanut tribe were already on their way to Broadway.

— Gwendolyn Logan, story, Philip Hubbard, scenario

== Cast ==
- Hoot Gibson as Tom
- Josephine Hill as Susie
- Stanhope Wheatcroft as Beverly
- William Lloyd as Ten Spot
- Ah Wing as the Chinese man
- H. H. Pattee credited as Herbert Pattee as Mike
- Harry Schumm as Bud
- C. E. Anderson as the Sheriff

== Censorship ==
West is Best was initially rejected in its entirety by the Kansas Board of Review, but upon appeal, the film passed with several eliminations. The board required the shortening of the hold-up, leaving only enough to establish continuity. The struggle with the girl in the cabin was cut down to just her entering the cabin and then her being rescued, all scenes in between were removed.

== See also ==
- Hoot Gibson filmography
