= Harry Schumm =

American actor

- Born: September 27, 1877; Chicago, Illinois
- Died: April 4, 1953 (aged 75); Los Angeles, California
- Occupation: Actor
- Years active: 1913-1920

Harry Schumm (September 27, 1877 – April 4, 1953) was an American silent film actor. He appeared in almost 50 films between 1913 and 1920. He was born in Chicago, Illinois, and died in Los Angeles, California.

== Selected filmography ==
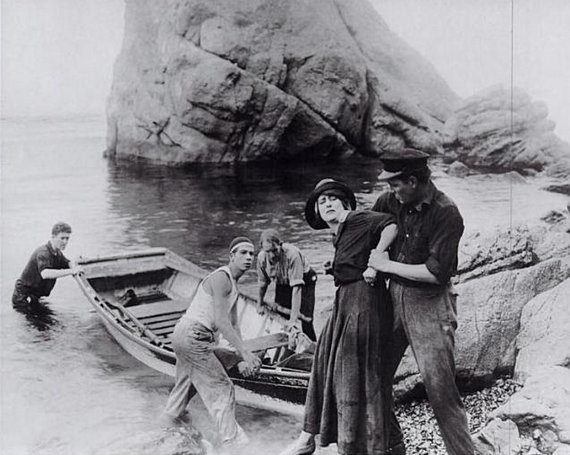
Schumm (right) menaces Grace Cunard in Francis Ford's 1915 film Smuggler's Island.

- A Forest Romance (1913)
- For the Peace of Bear Valley (1913)
- Lucille Love, Girl of Mystery (1914)
- The Hazards of Helen (1914)
- The Mysterious Rose (1914)
- The Broken Coin (1915)
- The Double Hold-Up (1919)
- West Is Best (1920)
- The Path She Chose (1920)
