= Phil Rosen =

American film director (1888–1951)

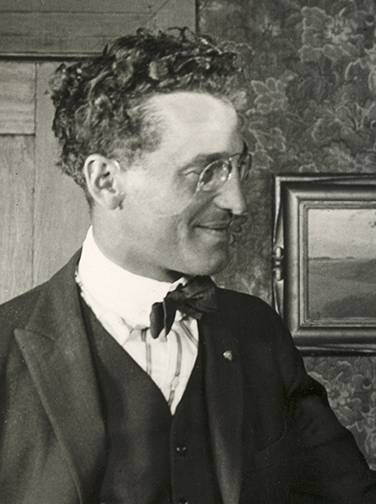
- Phil Rosen (1920)
- Born: May 8, 1888; Marienburg, German Empire
- Died: October 22, 1951 (aged 63); Hollywood, California
- Occupations: Film director, cinematographer
- Years active: 1915–1949
- Title: ASC Founding Member; President 1918 to 1921

Philip E. Rosen (May 8, 1888 – October 22, 1951) was an American film director and cinematographer. He directed more than 140 films between 1915 and 1949.

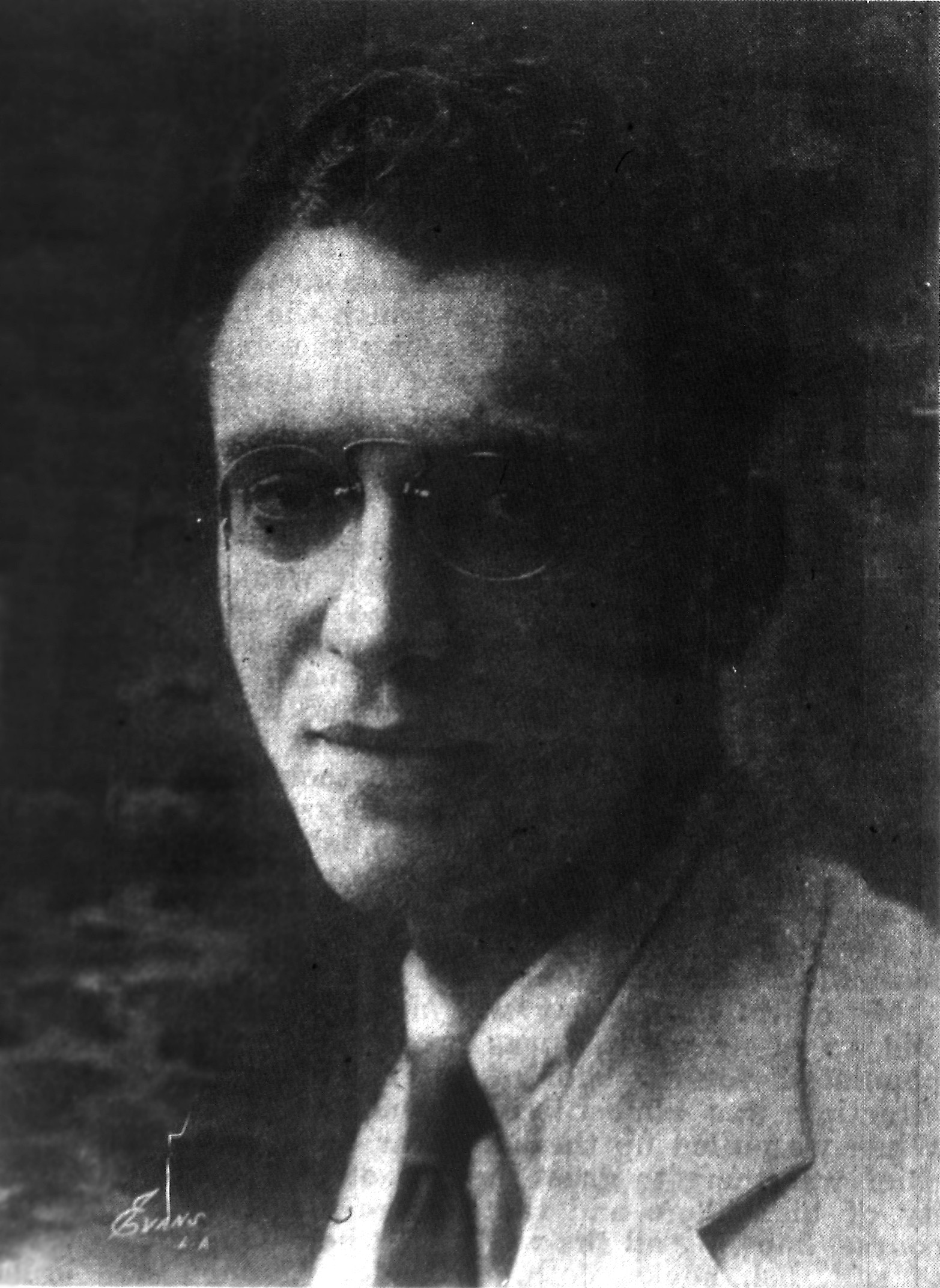
A photo by Nelson Evans of Rosen in 1921

He was born in Marienburg, German Empire (now, Malbork, Poland), grew up in Machias, Maine, and died in Hollywood, California, of a heart attack. He was one of the founders of the American Society of Cinematographers. Rosen was married to model and actress Joyzelle Joyner.

Rosen was meant to direct The Mad Dog of Europe, a film written by Herman J. Mankiewicz with Rudolph Hitler as its central character, but the film was never made.

== Selected filmography ==
- The Heart of Maryland (1915)
- Sin (1915)
- Blazing Love (1916)
- Romeo and Juliet (1916)
- Her Greatest Love (1917)
- Heart and Soul (1917)
- The Spreading Dawn (1917)
- The Double Hold-Up (1919)
- The Jay Bird (1920)
- West Is Best (1920)
- The Greatest Love (1920)
- Under Crimson Skies (1920)
- Roarin' Dan (1920)
- The Sheriff's Oath (1920)
- The Road to Divorce (1920)
- Are All Men Alike? (1920)
- The Path She Chose (1920)
- The Road to Divorce (1920)
- Ladies Must Live (1921)
- The Lure of Youth (1921)
- The Little Fool (1921)
- Extravagance (1921)
- Across the Continent (1922)
- The Bonded Woman (1922)
- The Young Rajah (1922)
- Handle with Care (1922)
- Abraham Lincoln (1924)
- The Heart of a Siren (1925)
- The White Monkey (1925)
- Wandering Footsteps (1925)
- The Adorable Deceiver (1926)
- Rose of the Tenements (1926)
- A Woman's Heart (1926)
- California or Bust (1927)
- The Cancelled Debt (1927)
- Closed Gates (1927)
- The Woman Who Did Not Care (1927)
- Stolen Pleasures (1927)
- In the First Degree (1927)
- Pretty Clothes (1927)
- Thumbs Down (1927)
- Stranded (1927)
- Undressed (1928)
- Burning Up Broadway (1928)
- The Apache (1928)
- Modern Mothers (1928)
- The Branded Man (1928)
- The Phantom in the House (1929)
- The Faker (1929)
- The Rampant Age (1930)
- Second Honeymoon (1930)
- Alias – the Bad Man (1931)
- The Pocatello Kid (1931)
- Two Gun Man (1931)
- Self Defense (1932)
- Young Blood (1932)
- Whistlin' Dan (1932)
- The Gay Buckaroo (1932)
- A Man's Land (1932)
- Devil's Mate (1933) remade by Rosen as I Killed That Man (1941)
- The Sphinx (1933) remade by Rosen as Phantom Killer (1942)
- Shadows of Sing Sing (1933)
- Hold the Press (1933)
- Black Beauty (1933)
- A Lost Lady (1934)
- Woman in the Dark (1934)
- Little Men (1934)
- Forbidden Territory (1934)
- Take the Stand (1934)
- Beggars in Ermine (1934)
- Dangerous Corner (1934)
- The Unwelcome Stranger (1935)
- Ellis Island (1936)
- Three of a Kind (1936)
- Roaring Timber (1937)
- The Marines Are Here (1938)
- Missing Evidence (1939)
- Ex-Champ (1939)
- Queen of the Yukon (1940)
- Phantom of Chinatown (1940)
- The Deadly Game (1941)
- Spooks Run Wild (1941)
- Roar of the Press (1941)
- Paper Bullets (1941)
- The Man with Two Lives (1942)
- The Mystery of Marie Roget (1942)
- A Gentle Gangster (1943)
- Charlie Chan in the Secret Service (1944)
- Charlie Chan in The Chinese Cat (1944)
- Charlie Chan in Black Magic (1944)
- Charlie Chan in Red Dragon (1945)
- Charlie Chan in the Scarlet Clue (1945)
- Charlie Chan in the Jade Mask (1945)
- Captain Tugboat Annie (1945)
- In Old New Mexico (1945)
- The Shadow Returns (1946)
- The Strange Mr. Gregory (1946)
- Step by Step (1946)
- The Secret of St. Ives (1949)

== Works cited ==
- Waldman, Harry (2008). Nazi Films In America, 1933-1942. McFarland & Company. ISBN 9780786438617.
