= An Engineer's Sweetheart =

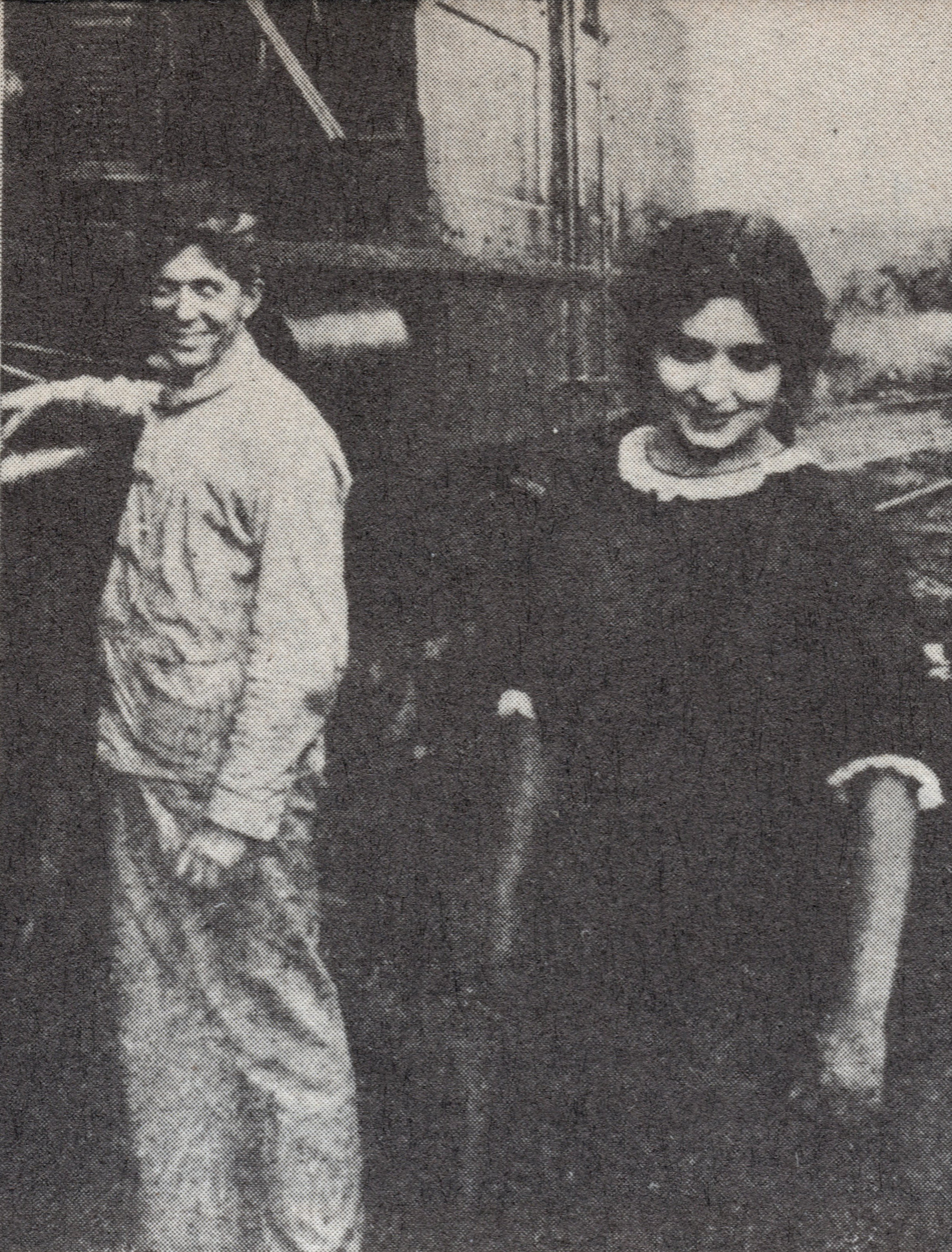
- Directed by: Fred J. Balshofer
- Produced by: Kalem Company; Bison Film Company
- Starring: Alice Joyce
- Distributed by: Kalem Company
- Release date: June 14, 1910
- Running time: 1 reel
- Country: USA
- Language: Silent..English titles

An Engineer's Sweetheart a.k.a. '(The) Engineer's Sweetheart' is a lost 1910 silent film short directed by Fred J. Balshofer and starring Alice Joyce. It was produced and released by the Kalem Company and Bison Film Company.

== Cast ==
- Alice Joyce
