= The Double Hold-Up =

1919 film

- Directed by: Phil Rosen
- Written by: Arthur Henry Gooden; Elizabeth Logan
- Starring: Hoot Gibson
- Distributed by: Universal Film Manufacturing Company
- Release date: December 20, 1919
- Running time: 20 minutes
- Country: United States
- Languages: Silent; English intertitles

The Double Hold-Up is a 1919 American short silent Western film directed by Phil Rosen and featuring Hoot Gibson.

== Plot ==
This plot summary comes from the original Library of Congress copyright filing for the film:

The Broncho Kid was looking for a job. At the fork of the road he couldn't decide which turning to take, Redgap or Sawbuck. A bottle by the roadside caught his eye. It was labeled "Bronx Cocktail."

The kid threw the bottle in the air with the determination "Two hits and Redgap wins," plugged the bottle twice. Arriving at Redgap there the kid demanded a "Bronx" of the astounded barkeep.

The idea was repugnant to Wade, so he dropped his gun on the kid and told him: "You'll have whisky—in a mug—and—you'll like it."

The kid had nothing to say and took the whisky poured for him, but as soon as he had the mug in his hand he slung the contents into Wade's face, grabbed his gun and holding Wade up, remarked cheerfully; "And now I'll have that Bronx."

John Wright, owner of the Bar Z ranch, was so taken with the kid's methods that he offered him a job.

Just then the sheriff blew in with news that the local badman "The Spook," had rustled a bunch of Wright's cattle, and Wright returned to his ranch.

Wade cocked his ears at mention of the rustling, but he was at the moment more interested in the local paper.

The kid sets out on foot for Wright's ranch. Wade, still sore, masks his face and holds up the kid. He marches the kid in front of him, but the kid by stumbling sends Wade flying over his head and grabs Wade's gun. He finds Wade's horse and after roping Wade, takes him down to the Bar Z as a prisoner.

Bud Johnson, one of the Wright outfit, is in love with Sadie, Wright's daughter, but Sadie does not respond. When the kid arrives with his prisoner and is made much of, Bud is ready to explode. Wade is locked up in an outhouse and Bud is set guard over him, but Wade makes a pact with Bud, that if he will set him free he will help Bud get Sadie. Bud falls for the plan. That night they kidnap Sadie and drag her off to a shack in the mountains. Wade, who is "the Spook" prepares to hold up the stage. He sends his gang on ahead to wait for him and just then the kid arrives at the shack. Sadie gets away from the shack and sees the kid go in. She hears the fight inside but cannot see what happens, and presently she sees a masked figure dash out of the shack and mount a horse. She catches a horse and rides off to the ranch to give the alarm.

The hold-up of the stage ends in disaster to the bandits as the Sheriff has filled the stage with his own men all ready for the attack. The Spook and his gang are captured and the Spook is unmasked, disclosing, the Broncho Kid, but the Sheriff, Wright and Sadie arrive in time to clear the kid of suspicion.

— Elizabeth Logan, story, Arthur Gooden, scenario

== Cast ==
- Hoot Gibson as The Broncho Kid
- Josephine Hill as Sadie Wright
- Clark Comstock as Sadie's Father
- Charles Brinley as the Sheriff
- Robert Walker as Wade
- Harry Schumm as Bud Johnson
- Madge Hunt as Mrs. Wright

== See also ==
- List of American films of 1919
- Hoot Gibson filmography
