= Avocado Heights, California =

- Unincorporated community Census-designated place
- Interactive map of Avocado Heights, California
- Location in the United States
- Coordinates: 34°2′19″N 118°0′16″W
- Country: United States
- State: California
- County: Los Angeles

Area
  - Total: 2.25 sq mi (5.84 km^{2})
  - Land: 2.25 sq mi (5.83 km^{2})
  - Water: 0.0039 sq mi (0.01 km^{2}) 0.10%
- Elevation: 338 ft (103 m)

Population (2020)
  - Total: 13,317
  - Density: 5,916.9/sq mi (2,284.54/km^{2})
- Time zone: UTC-8 (PST)
  - Summer (DST): UTC-7 (PDT)
- ZIP code: 91746
- Area code: 626
- FIPS code: 06-03344
- GNIS feature ID: 1724314

Avocado Heights is an unincorporated community and census-designated place (CDP) in the San Gabriel Valley of Los Angeles County, California, United States. It is almost entirely surrounded by the City of Industry with only a small strip of unincorporated Los Angeles County separating it from South El Monte. It is in close proximity to both the Pomona (SR-60) and San Gabriel (I-605) freeways. To the west is the San Gabriel River and the California Country Club. Avocado Heights is approximately 15 miles (24 km) from the downtown Los Angeles Civic Center. The population was 13,317 at the 2020 census.

A significant portion of Avocado Heights remains equestrian and semi-rural, with many homes on lots of 0.5 acres 21,780 square feet (2,023 m^{2}) or more. The proximity of polluting industries in what became the City of Industry, as well as the Puente Hills Landfill, suppressed property values throughout the post-World War II era—discouraging the development that transformed most of the San Gabriel Valley into a relatively densely developed suburban area.

== Geography ==
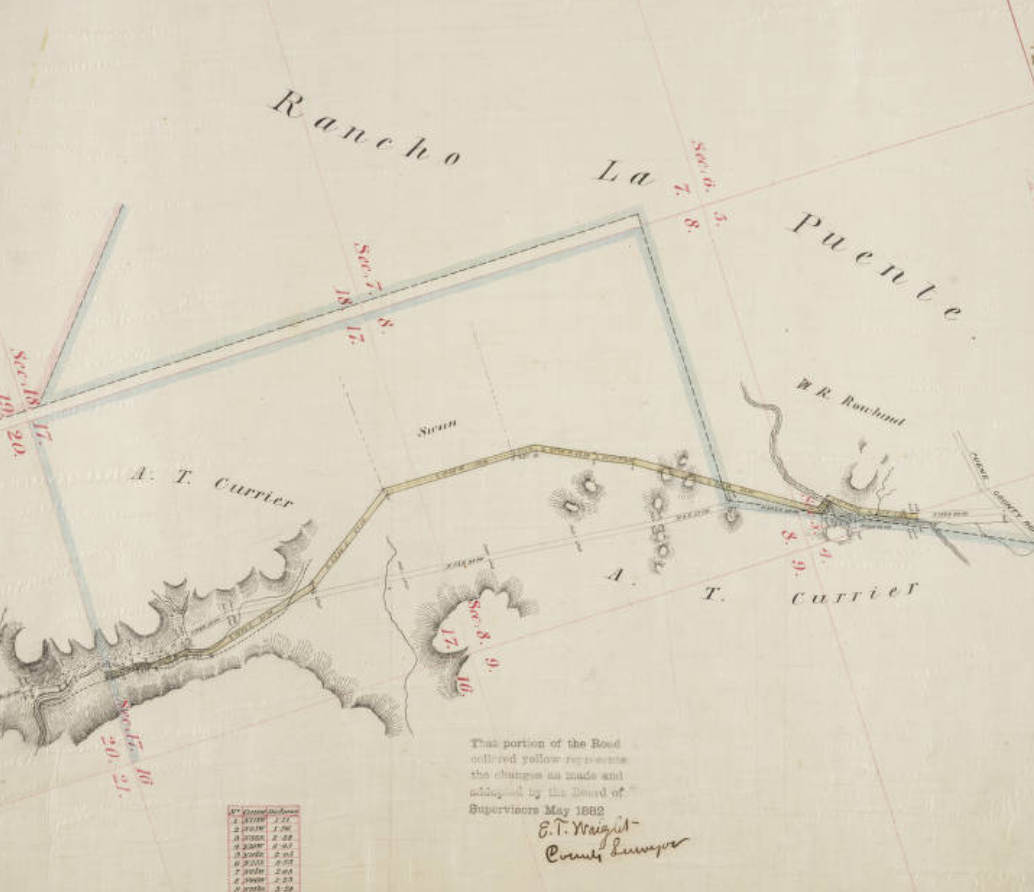
Avocado Heights sits on land that was originally part of Rancho La Puente, a Mexican era rancho grant.

Avocado Heights is located at 34°2′19″N 118°0′16″W (34.038610, −118.004575), or about 1.7 miles (2.7 km) southeast of El Monte. According to the United States Census Bureau, the CDP has a total area of 2.3 square miles (6.0 km^{2}), of which 99.90% is land and 0.10% is water.

The primary thoroughfare is Don Julian Road, named for the nickname given to early Anglo settler William Workman by local Californios; his homestead lies on Don Julian Road just to the east in Industry. The community is served by Don Julian Elementary School, which is part of the Bassett Unified School District.

== Culture ==
Avocado Heights is known for its private ranches with horse riding.

From the 1920s until the early 2000s, there was a tall, single white tower on 3rd Avenue and Starlight Lane.

From the 2010s a skatepark was built in Avocado Heights.

== Climate ==
Avocado Heights is classified as Hot Summer Mediterranean climate. It is characterized by warm winters and very hot summers and receives a shielding effect from nearby hills to the south which keeps it warmer than other cities nearby.

Climate data for Avocado Heights, California (1981–2010 normals)
Month	Jan	Feb	Mar	Apr	May	Jun	Jul	Aug	Sep	Oct	Nov	Dec	Year
Mean daily maximum °F (°C)	72 (22)	73 (23)	76 (24)	80 (27)	84 (29)	90 (32)	95 (35)	96 (36)	95 (35)	85 (29)	79 (26)	72 (22)	83 (28)
Mean daily minimum °F (°C)	49 (9)	50 (10)	52 (11)	54 (12)	59 (15)	63 (17)	65 (18)	67 (19)	65 (18)	60 (16)	53 (12)	49 (9)	57 (14)
Average precipitation inches (mm)	3.78 (96)	3.53 (90)	2.66 (68)	.93 (24)	.33 (8.4)	.06 (1.5)	.01 (0.25)	.03 (0.76)	.18 (4.6)	.30 (7.6)	1.21 (31)	2.43 (62)	16.43 (417)

== Demographics ==
Historical population
Census	Pop.	Note	%±
1970	9,810		—
1980	11,721		19.5%
1990	14,232		21.4%
2000	15,148		6.4%
2010	15,411		1.7%
2020	13,317		−13.6%
U.S. Decennial Census; 1860–1870 1880-1890; 1900 1910 1920; 1930 1940 1950; 1960 1970 1980; 1990 2000 2010; 2020

Avocado Heights first appeared as an unincorporated place in the 1970 U.S. census as part of the East San Gabriel Valley census county division; and as a census designated place in the 1980 United States census.

=== Racial and ethnic composition ===
Avocado Heights CDP, California – Racial and ethnic composition Note: the US Census treats Hispanic/Latino as an ethnic category. This table excludes Latinos from the racial categories and assigns them to a separate category. Hispanics/Latinos may be of any race.
Race / Ethnicity (NH = Non-Hispanic)	Pop 1980	Pop 1990	Pop 2000	Pop 2010	Pop 2020	% 1980	% 1990	% 2000	% 2010	% 2020
White alone (NH)	3,762	2,882	1,757	1,199	771	32.10%	20.25%	11.60%	7.78%	5.79%
Black or African American alone (NH)	242	103	87	100	80	2.06%	0.72%	0.57%	0.65%	0.60%
Native American or Alaska Native alone (NH)	31	50	36	19	21	0.26%	0.35%	0.24%	0.12%	0.16%
Asian alone (NH)	1,056	1,562	1,341	1,324	1,608	9.01%	10.98%	8.85%	8.59%	12.07%
Native Hawaiian or Pacific Islander alone (NH)	1,056	1,562	13	8	7	9.01%	10.98%	0.09%	0.05%	0.05%
Other race alone (NH)	34	39	14	29	63	0.29%	0.27%	0.09%	0.19%	0.47%
Mixed race or Multiracial (NH)	x	x	124	84	129	x	x	0.82%	0.55%	0.97%
Hispanic or Latino (any race)	6,596	9,596	11,776	12,648	10,638	56.28%	67.43%	77.74%	82.07%	79.88%
Total	11,721	14,232	15,148	15,411	13,317	100.00%	100.00%	100.00%	100.00%	100.00%

=== 2020 census ===
As of the 2020 census, Avocado Heights had a population of 13,317 and a population density of 5,916.0 inhabitants per square mile (2,284.2/km^{2}). 100.0% of residents lived in urban areas and 0.0% lived in rural areas.

The census reported that 99.0% of the population lived in households, 1.0% lived in non-institutionalized group quarters, and no one was institutionalized.

There were 3,477 households, of which 42.6% had children under the age of 18 living in them. Of all households, 56.6% were married-couple households, 6.3% were cohabiting couple households, 23.1% had a female householder with no spouse or partner present, and 14.0% had a male householder with no spouse or partner present. About 10.7% of all households were made up of individuals, and 5.3% had someone living alone who was 65 years of age or older. The average household size was 3.79. There were 2,963 families (85.2% of all households).

There were 3,581 housing units at an average density of 1,590.8 units per square mile (614.2 units/km^{2}), of which 2.9% were vacant and 97.1% were occupied. Of occupied units, 73.1% were owner-occupied and 26.9% were occupied by renters. The homeowner vacancy rate was 0.7%, and the rental vacancy rate was 2.0%.

The age distribution was 21.2% under the age of 18, 10.9% aged 18 to 24, 26.7% aged 25 to 44, 25.8% aged 45 to 64, and 15.5% who were 65 years of age or older. The median age was 37.8 years. For every 100 females, there were 96.0 males, and for every 100 females age 18 and over, there were 94.7 males age 18 and over.

=== Income and poverty ===
In 2023, the US Census Bureau estimated that the median household income was $95,000, and the per capita income was $34,032. About 8.3% of families and 10.6% of the population were below the poverty line.

=== 2010 census ===
The 2010 United States census reported that Avocado Heights had a population of 15,411. The population density was 5,423.8 inhabitants per square mile (2,094.1/km^{2}). The racial makeup of Avocado Heights was 8,564 (55.6%) White (7.8% Non-Hispanic White), 136 (0.9%) African American, 107 (0.7%) Native American, 1,359 (8.8%) Asian, 13 (0.1%) Pacific Islander, 4,726 (30.7%) from other races, and 506 (3.3%) from two or more races. Hispanic or Latino of any race were 12,648 persons (82.1%).

The Census reported that 15,332 people (99.5% of the population) lived in households, 79 (0.5%) lived in non-institutionalized group quarters, and 0 (0%) were institutionalized.

There were 3,813 households, out of which 1,900 (49.8%) had children under the age of 18 living in them, 2,351 (61.7%) were opposite-sex married couples living together, 622 (16.3%) had a female householder with no husband present, 331 (8.7%) had a male householder with no wife present. There were 205 (5.4%) unmarried opposite-sex partnerships, and 23 (0.6%) same-sex married couples or partnerships. 368 households (9.7%) were made up of individuals, and 181 (4.7%) had someone living alone who was 65 years of age or older. The average household size was 4.02. There were 3,304 families (86.7% of all households); the average family size was 4.16.

The population was spread out, with 4,210 people (27.3%) under the age of 18, 1,676 people (10.9%) aged 18 to 24, 4,277 people (27.8%) aged 25 to 44, 3,575 people (23.2%) aged 45 to 64, and 1,673 people (10.9%) who were 65 years of age or older. The median age was 33.7 years. For every 100 females, there were 98.5 males. For every 100 females age 18 and over, there were 96.4 males.

There were 3,922 housing units at an average density of 1,380.3 per square mile (532.9/km^{2}), of which 2,934 (76.9%) were owner-occupied, and 879 (23.1%) were occupied by renters. The homeowner vacancy rate was 0.7%; the rental vacancy rate was 3.1%. 11,422 people (74.1% of the population) lived in owner-occupied housing units and 3,910 people (25.4%) lived in rental housing units.

According to the 2010 United States Census, Avocado Heights had a median household income of $72,240, with 14.1% of the population living below the federal poverty line.

== Government ==
In the California State Legislature, Avocado Heights is in the 30th senatorial district, represented by Democrat Bob Archuleta, and in the 56th Assembly district, represented by Democrat Lisa Calderon.

In the United States House of Representatives, Avocado Heights is in California's 31st congressional district, represented by Democrat Gil Cisneros.

== Education ==
Students in the northern portion of Avocado Heights are zoned to Don Julian Elementary School in the Bassett Unified School District and to Bassett High School while students in the southern portion are zoned to Wallen Andrews Elementary School in the Whittier City School District and to Pioneer High School in the Whittier Union High School District.
