= West Puente Valley, California =

- census-designated place
- Interactive map of West Puente Valley, California
- Location in the United States
- Coordinates: 34°3′3″N 117°58′11″W
- Country: United States
- State: California
- County: Los Angeles

Area
  - Total: 1.871 sq mi (4.845 km^{2})
  - Land: 1.870 sq mi (4.842 km^{2})
  - Water: 0.0012 sq mi (0.003 km^{2}) 0.06%
- Elevation: 322 ft (98 m)

Population (2020)
  - Total: 22,959
  - Density: 12,280/sq mi (4,742/km^{2})
- Time zone: UTC-8 (PST)
  - Summer (DST): UTC-7 (PDT)
- ZIP code: 91746
- Area code: 626
- FIPS code: 06-84774
- GNIS feature ID: 1867073

West Puente Valley is an unincorporated community and census-designated place in the San Gabriel Valley of Los Angeles County, California, United States, northwest of La Puente. The population was 22,959 at the 2020 census, up from 22,636 at the 2010 census. The community is probably named for its location related to the city of La Puente.

== Description ==
West Puente Valley is an unincorporated community located in the heart of the San Gabriel Valley, between Downtown Los Angeles and Pomona. The community is easily accessible to the San Gabriel River Freeway to the west, the San Bernardino Freeway to the north, and the Pomona Freeway to the south.

West Puente Valley is bounded by La Puente to the south and east, Baldwin Park to the northwest, West Covina to the northeast, and the San Gabriel River Freeway and the western boundary of City of Industry to the west. The community is mainly residential. The ZIP code that serves the community is 91744 and 91746.

== Geography ==
West Puente Valley is located at 34°3′3″N 117°58′11″W (34.050838, -117.969783).

According to the United States Census Bureau, the community has a total area of 1.9 square miles (4.5 km^{2}), over 99% of it land.

== Demographics ==
Historical population
| Census | Pop. | Note | %± |
|---|---|---|---|
| 1970 | 20,733 | | — |
| 1980 | 20,445 | | −1.4% |
| 1990 | 20,254 | | −0.9% |
| 2000 | 22,589 | | 11.5% |
| 2010 | 22,636 | | 0.2% |
| 2020 | 22,959 | | 1.4% |
U.S. Decennial Census; 1860–1870 1880-1890; 1900 1910 1920; 1930 1940 1950; 1960 1970 1980; 1990 2000 2010; 2020

West Puente Valley first appeared as an unincorporated place in the 1970 U.S. census as part of the East San Gabriel Valley census county division; and as a census designated place in the 1980 United States census.

=== Racial and ethnic composition ===
West Puente Valley CDP, California – Racial and ethnic composition Note: the US Census treats Hispanic/Latino as an ethnic category. This table excludes Latinos from the racial categories and assigns them to a separate category. Hispanics/Latinos may be of any race.
| Race / Ethnicity (NH = Non-Hispanic) | Pop 2000 | Pop 2010 | Pop 2020 | % 2000 | % 2010 | % 2020 |
|---|---|---|---|---|---|---|
| White alone (NH) | 1,659 | 1,087 | 713 | 7.34% | 4.80% | 3.11% |
| Black or African American alone (NH) | 499 | 381 | 311 | 2.21% | 1.68% | 1.35% |
| Native American or Alaska Native alone (NH) | 63 | 37 | 35 | 0.28% | 0.16% | 0.15% |
| Asian alone (NH) | 1,743 | 1,615 | 3,299 | 7.72% | 7.13% | 14.37% |
| Native Hawaiian or Pacific Islander alone (NH) | 25 | 24 | 40 | 0.11% | 0.11% | 0.17% |
| Other race alone (NH) | 20 | 15 | 95 | 0.09% | 0.07% | 0.41% |
| Mixed race or Multiracial (NH) | 164 | 112 | 168 | 0.73% | 0.49% | 0.73% |
| Hispanic or Latino (any race) | 18,416 | 19,365 | 18,298 | 81.53% | 85.55% | 79.70% |
| Total | 22,589 | 22,636 | 22,959 | 100.00% | 100.00% | 100.00% |

=== 2020 census ===
As of the 2020 census, West Puente Valley had a population of 22,959 and a population density of 12,277.5 inhabitants per square mile (4,740.4/km^{2}). The median age was 37.8 years; 21.3% of residents were under the age of 18, 10.5% were 18 to 24, 26.8% were 25 to 44, 26.0% were 45 to 64, and 15.5% were 65 years of age or older. For every 100 females there were 96.5 males, and for every 100 females age 18 and over there were 95.2 males age 18 and over.

The census reported that 99.7% of the population lived in households, 0.3% lived in non-institutionalized group quarters, and 0.1% were institutionalized.

There were 5,343 households, of which 44.7% had children under the age of 18 living in them. 54.7% were married-couple households, 4.7% were cohabiting couple households, 14.3% were households with a male householder and no spouse or partner present, and 26.3% were households with a female householder and no spouse or partner present. About 10.7% of all households were made up of individuals and 6.6% had someone living alone who was 65 years of age or older; the average household size was 4.28. There were 4,620 families (86.5% of all households).

There were 5,400 housing units at an average density of 2,887.7 units per square mile (1,114.9 units/km^{2}), 1.1% of which were vacant. Of the 5,343 occupied units, 78.3% were owner-occupied and 21.7% were occupied by renters.

100.0% of residents lived in urban areas, while 0.0% lived in rural areas.

Racial composition as of the 2020 census
| Race | Number | Percent |
|---|---|---|
| White | 3,352 | 14.6% |
| Black or African American | 360 | 1.6% |
| American Indian and Alaska Native | 616 | 2.7% |
| Asian | 3,382 | 14.7% |
| Native Hawaiian and Other Pacific Islander | 50 | 0.2% |
| Some other race | 10,045 | 43.8% |
| Two or more races | 5,154 | 22.4% |
| Hispanic or Latino (of any race) | 18,298 | 79.7% |

=== 2010 census ===
At the 2010 census West Puente Valley had a population of 22,636. The population density was 12,846.0 inhabitants per square mile (4,959.9/km^{2}). The racial makeup of West Puente Valley was 11,383 (50.3%) White (4.8% Non-Hispanic White), 471 (2.1%) African American, 256 (1.1%) Native American, 1,650 (7.3%) Asian, 28 (0.1%) Pacific Islander, 7,945 (35.1%) from other races, and 903 (4.0%) from two or more races. Hispanic or Latino of any race were 19,365 persons (85.5%).

The census reported that 22,549 people (99.6% of the population) lived in households, 82 (0.4%) lived in non-institutionalized group quarters, and 5 (0%) were institutionalized.

There were 4,788 households, 2,650 (55.3%) had children under the age of 18 living in them, 2,930 (61.2%) were opposite-sex married couples living together, 910 (19.0%) had a female householder with no husband present, 403 (8.4%) had a male householder with no wife present. There were 238 (5.0%) unmarried opposite-sex partnerships, and 33 (0.7%) same-sex married couples or partnerships. 426 households (8.9%) were one person and 277 (5.8%) had someone living alone who was 65 or older. The average household size was 4.71. There were 4,243 families (88.6% of households); the average family size was 4.73.

The age distribution was 6,325 people (27.9%) under the age of 18, 2,647 people (11.7%) aged 18 to 24, 6,154 people (27.2%) aged 25 to 44, 5,028 people (22.2%) aged 45 to 64, and 2,482 people (11.0%) who were 65 or older. The median age was 32.6 years. For every 100 females, there were 97.0 males. For every 100 females age 18 and over, there were 97.0 males.

There were 4,898 housing units at an average density of 2,779.6 per square mile, of the occupied units 3,887 (81.2%) were owner-occupied and 901 (18.8%) were rented. The homeowner vacancy rate was 1.2%; the rental vacancy rate was 2.1%. 18,419 people (81.4% of the population) lived in owner-occupied housing units and 4,130 people (18.2%) lived in rental housing units.

According to the 2010 United States Census, West Puente Valley had a median household income of $63,750, with 11.1% of the population living below the federal poverty line.

=== Income ===
In 2023, the US Census Bureau estimated that the median household income was $86,692, and the per capita income was $26,071. About 9.4% of families and 11.3% of the population were below the poverty line.

== Politics ==
In the state legislature West Puente Valley is located in the 30th senatorial district, represented by Democrat Bob Archuleta, and in the 48th Assembly district, represented by Democrat Blanca Rubio. Federally, West Puente Valley is located in California's 31st congressional district, which is represented by Democrat Gil Cisneros.

== Education ==
West Puente Valley is being served by two school districts: The Bassett Unified School District on the western side and the Hacienda La Puente Unified School District on the eastern side.
