= Before the White Man Came =

1920 Western film

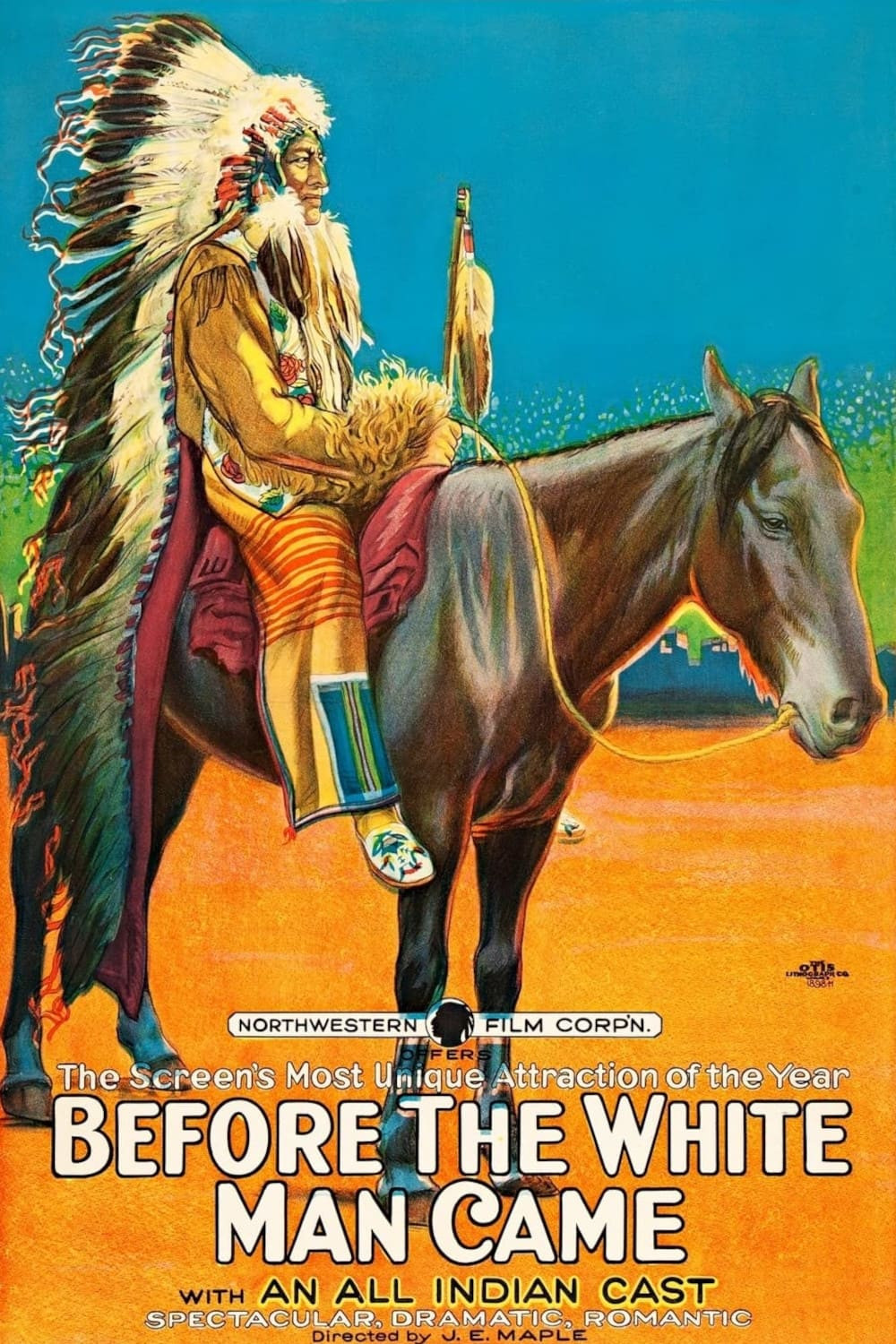
- 1920 promotional poster
- Directed by: John E. Maple
- Screenplay by: William E. Wing
- Starring: Old Badger; Bird Tail; Bear Claw
- Color process: Black and white
- Production company: Northwestern Film Corporation
- Distributed by: Arrow Film Corporation
- Release date: September 1, 1920 (United States)
- Running time: 46 minutes
- Country: United States
- Language: Silent (English intertitles)

Before the White Man Came is an American silent Western film directed by John E. Maple and released in 1920. It is one of the few films from the era that features an entirely Native American cast, composing of Crow and Cheyenne peoples.

== Plot ==
Big Elk and Che-wee-na, a man and a woman of the same tribe, are engaged to be married. White Wolf, the son of a chief from another tribe, wants to buy Che-wee-na from her father, but is rejected. White Wolf and Big Elk engage in hand-to-hand combat, and White Wolf is beaten. While the men of the tribe are away, White Wolf kidnaps Che-wee-na.

Che-wee-na is falsely accused of poisoning the water of White Wolf's tribe. She is about to be burned at the stake when Big Elk and the men of her tribe arrive to rescue her.

== Production ==
Director John Maple, after adopting a member of the Crow tribe, used the film to tell an authentic story of the American West before the appearance of White settlers.

The film was shot in 1918 or 1919 the Bighorn Mountains in Montana and Wyoming. Filming employed local Crow and Cheyenne actors. It had originally seven reels but was apparently cut down to five.

== Legacy and reception ==
The film is considered an important aspect of early cinema in the West, introducing audiences to distant, unspoiled, and magnificent regions with authentic glimpses into primitive life, while contributing to the discovery of the West by the film industry. It was said to feature "an all-Indian cast and present(s) authentic rites and ceremonies".

J. Hoberman, of The New York Times, lists it as part of "a small cluster of sympathetic films" that allow modern spectators to see "lost culture in found films".

The American Film Institute lists various reviews from early 1920. A review in the January 31, 1920 issue of The Moving Picture World wrote: "There are many deep perspectives photographed in the hills of Wyoming, and panoramas of the same region, and now and then a group of buffalo. The types chosen for the leaders of the romance on which the picture is built are a handsome maiden with her even handsomer brave. These red people are very much in earnest, and succeed in putting over the story with more 'punch' than would be expected from a people so far removed from the paths of the drama."
