= Bassett High School (California) =

Coordinates: 34.051817°N 117.977374°W

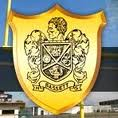

Location
- 755 Ardilla Ave; La Puente, California 91746; United States

Information
- Type: Public
- Established: 1965
- School district: Bassett Unified School District
- Staff: 37.44 (FTE)
- Enrollment: 839 (2022–2023)
- Student to teacher ratio: 22.41
- Mascot: Olympian
- Colors
- Website: Bassett High School

Bassett Senior High School is the only comprehensive high school for the Bassett Unified School District and is located at 755 N Ardilla Ave, La Puente, California 91746. The school mascot is The Olympian, a Greek god. The school colors are Black and Gold. The school coat of arms features three interlocked Olympic rings with the profile of an Olympian and feathers. The campus opened in 1965 and celebrated 50 years in 2015. The principal is Hector Vasquez.

The Bassett Olympian Stadium went through an extensive modernization which included a rubberized running track, artificial football field and cooling system, electric score board, drainage, replaced wood steps and seats of existing bleachers with aluminum panels; the BHS Football team, Track and Cross-country team and both boys and girls Soccer teams use the stadium. BHS Commencement ceremonies and Torch Middle School Promotion ceremonies are performed in the stadium. The BHS Gymnasium also went through an extensive renovation after the passing of Bond measure "E" in the district. The BHS boys and girls basketball team, the BHS volleyball team, and the BHS badminton team play in the Gym. Student Body sports rallies and renaissances rallies are usually done in the Gym. The school library is also currently going through renovations. The campus is two stories and has three quads and an amphitheater. The school has its own Theater equipped with a Band room. The campus also has a full swimming pool, and four fields used for its Baseball and Softball teams.

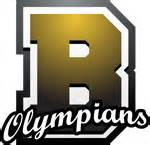
Logo with the mascot name

== Notable alumni ==
- Lionel Manuel, former New York Giants wide receiver who played seven seasons in the NFL (1984–1990) including a win in Super Bowl XXI versus Denver
- Kid Congo Powers (born Brian Tristan), guitarist for The Gun Club, The Cramps and Nick Cave and the Bad Seeds.
- Deezer D, actor and rapper born Dearon Thompson. He is best known for his role as Nurse Malik McGrath in the US TV series "ER" (1994–2009), and for his roles in the films CB4 (1993).
- John Singleton, American film director, screenwriter, and producer. .
- Ed Hernandez, California State Senate
- Sutan Amrull, Professional Makeup Artist and Drag Artist (Raja Gemini), Has worked on America's Next Top Model and won Season 3 of RuPaul's Drag Race
