= Oscar T. Bassett =

American businessman

Oscar Thomas Bassett
- Born: 1850; Vermont, U.S.
- Died: January 3, 1898 (aged 47–48); El Paso, Texas
- Occupation: Businessman
- Spouse: Myrtle Alma Nebeker
- Children: Charles Nebeker Bassett

Oscar Thomas "O.T." Bassett (1850 – January 3, 1898) was a prominent El Paso, Texas businessman. Bassett, California is named for him.

== Early life and career ==
Oscar T. Bassett, son of Abner Snow and Betsey Bassett and grandson of Perez and Lydia (Snow) Bassett, was born in Rutland County, Vermont and orphaned early. In the 1860 census, he was living in McHenry County, Illinois. With little formal education, he drifted in and out of the army before settling in Clinton, Indiana, where he was a contractor and lumber dealer. Bassett married Myrtle Alma Nebeker in 1879. A street was later named for him in Clinton.

== El Paso, Texas ==
Bassett moved to Fort Worth, Texas in 1879, where he started a lumber business. He arrived in El Paso, Texas in 1880 to buy real estate for the Texas and Pacific Railway and to investigate some Arizona mines. Bassett returned to Indiana for the birth of his son (C. N. Bassett). His wife died soon thereafter, and Bassett returned to El Paso. On the way he stopped in St. Louis, Missouri to arrange financing for El Paso's first bank. He later became a stockholder and director of the First National Bank of El Paso, later known as the State National Bank. Bassett was also in the lumber business and was a large landholder. He had properties and banking interests in Oklahoma, Los Angeles and El Paso. He was president of the El Paso school board in 1882. Bassett also served as an El Paso city councilman.

He died in his office above a lumberyard on January 3, 1898.

== Charles Nebeker Bassett ==
Charles Nebeker Bassett (October 8, 1880 – June 10, 1944), son of pioneer O.T. Bassett was born in Indiana, and educated in the schools of Indiana, graduating from Wabash College with the class of 1900. In 1901, Charles Bassett came to El Paso after the death of his father, to operate the O.T. Bassett and Company lumber business. In 1929 Charles Bassett built the 15-story O.T. Bassett Tower as a memorial to his father. Charles Bassett died in Santa Monica, California and is buried in the Evergreen Cemetery in El Paso, Texas.

== Bassett, California ==
In 1895, O.T. Bassett acquired 814 acres (3.29 km^{2}) of the Rancho La Puente from the son of William Workman and the short-lived Bassett Township was established. In 1921, Josephine Workman won a lawsuit against Charles N. Bassett to recover an interest in the Rancho La Puente land. The decision was reversed in 1922.
