= An Indian Love Story =

1911 film

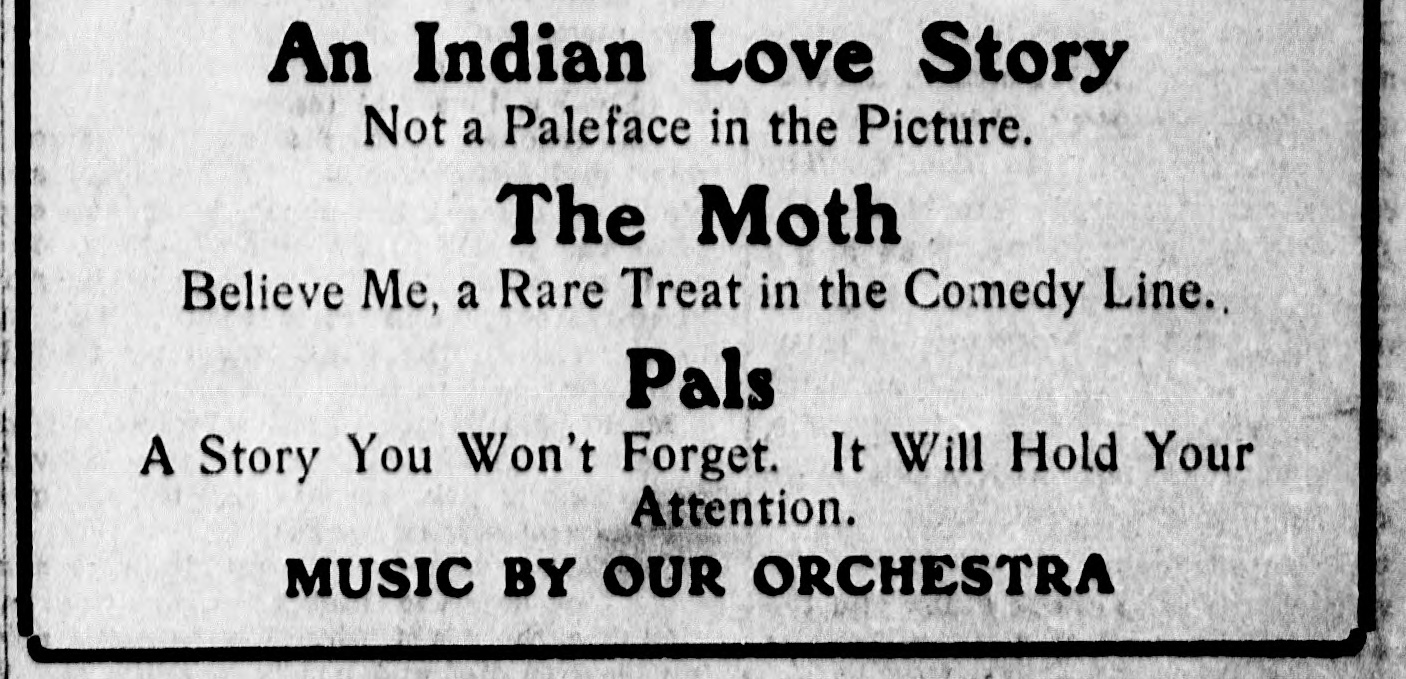
- Contemporary advertisement for An Indian Love Story and a few others
- Directed by: Fred J. Balshofer
- Produced by: Bison
- Starring: Mona Darkfeather
- Distributed by: New York Motion Picture Company
- Release date: 1911
- Running time: single reel
- Country: United States
- Languages: Silent; English intertitles

An Indian Love Story is a one-reel silent short film about personal relationships in a Native American community. The film is about two married couples, each of the partners of which are involved with the spouse of the other couple, a former lover. It is a western drama released in 1911 and directed by Fred J. Balshofer and was produced by Bison (a brand name under the New York Motion Picture Company). It was also titled An Indian Love Affair.

This film is one of the many films that claims to have utilized Native American actors, although Mona Darkfeather's heritage is not entirely clear. The description of the story in Moving Picture World said that no white people appeared as characters in the story's contest and didn't clarify whether the cast included only Native Americans. Previously, Lillian St. Cyr, a Winnebago Indian, had appeared in Kalem's The White Squaw and Lubin's The Falling Arrow.

== Plot ==
An Indian Love Story surrounds two couples who are in unhappy relationships. Two main characters, Deerheart and Mona (played by Mona Darkfeather), are partners. Another character, Dove Eye, is in love with Deerheart, even though Eagle Wing is hopelessly in love with her. A quadrangle is formed among the characters that are unhappy and dissatisfied with their relationships. The men fight for the women they desire through a series of events. Deerheart almost gets executed at the stake due to a misunderstanding by Dove Eye's father. Dove Eye decides that because of the encounter with her father, she was never fit for Deerheart's love. She then turns to Eagle Wing. Deerheart is released and is returned to Mona.

== Cast ==
- Mona Darkfeather as Mona
- Dove Eye as Dove Eye, Mona's Rival
- Chief Eagle Wing as Eagle Wing, Dove Eye's Admirer (as Eagle Wing)

== Production ==
An Indian Love Story was requested to be released early by the educational films corporation. The film is a western drama produced by Bison and released on August 18, 1911. The film is an integration of story, scenery, and Native American characters. A suggestion was made that the Native Americans were of Crow Indian descent and resided on their Wyoming reservation. But in 1911, Bison was in southern California and filmed this story in or near Los Angeles and used local actors from their own stock company. The film producers requested that the actors be as realistic as possible and be aware of Native American customs. It is unclear whether the cast consisted of only Indian actors. The film is one of the many early films about two Native American couples swapping partners.

== Casting ==
Even before An Indian Love Story, both Indian and white actors were cast to represent Native Americans in films. But Indians did not believe that the white actors reproduced the Indian lifestyle accurately and accused films of false portrayal of Indians. Native Americans protested and claimed that only Indians should play the roles of Indians. Bison's Indian films occasionally consisted of Indian actors and their stories showed the "noble savage and condemned the hostile warrior", although they were not the only studio to do so.

== Sources ==
- Aleiss, Angela. Making the white man's Indian: Native Americans and Hollywood movies. Westport: An imprint of greenwood, 2005.
- Chalmers. Moving picture world. New York: New York: Chalmers, 1911.
- Cinematograph. Moving Picture News. Cinematograph Publishing Company, 1911.
- York, New. Motion Picture News. New York: New York: Motion Picture News, 1919.
