= Frank Montgomery (director) =

American film director

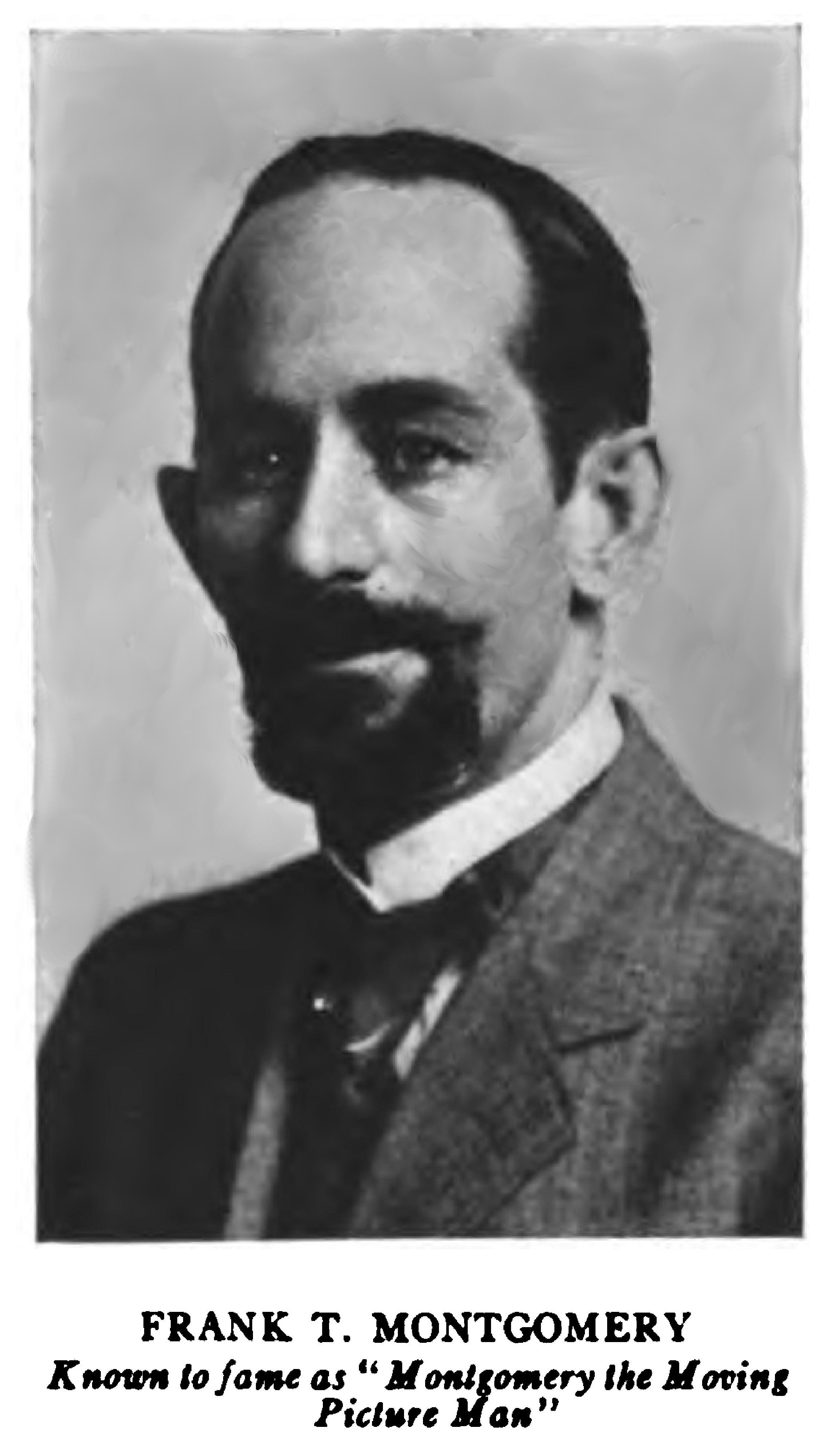
- Born: Frank E. Montgomery; June 14, 1870
- Died: July 18, 1944 (aged 74)
- Occupations: Actor; film director

Frank E. Montgomery (June 14, 1870 – July 18, 1944) was an early American silent film director and actor.

== Biography ==
Montgomery acted in 28 films but is most acclaimed as a silent film director in which he is credited with directing 82 films. He was married to actresses Florence McClain as well as Josephine Mercedes Workman, who used the stage name Princess Mona Darkfeather to forge a career playing Native American roles.

Many of Montgomery's film titles contain Native American references, such as Darkfeather's Sacrifice, Apache Love, An Indian's Gratitude, The Red Girl's Sacrifice, Mona of the Modocs, An Apache Father's Vengeance, Big Rock's Last Stand, The Half-Breed Scout, A Blackfoot Conspiracy, A Red Man's Love, A Daughter of the Redskins, The Massacre of Santa Fe Trail, and A White Indian. He also directed the now-lost film The Spirit of '76 (1917).

He is referenced obliquely in Gerald Vizenor's short story "Almost Browne," in the character of Professor Monte Franzgomery, who teaches Romantic Literature but who sees the Native American culture through his own romanticizations.

== Selected filmography ==
- Two Knights of Vaudeville (1915)
- The Kiss of Hate (1916)
- Notorious Gallagher (1916)
- Her Debt of Honor (1916)
- Life's Shadows (1916)
- The Brand of Cowardice (1916)
- The Call of Her People (1917)
- Cardigan (1920)
- Who's Cheating? (1924)
- Floodgates (1924)
- The Mad Dancer (1925)
- Red Love (1925)
- Children of the Whirlwind (1925)
- Aloma of the South Seas (1926)
- So's Your Old Man (1926)
