= National Register of Historic Places listings in Nance County, Nebraska =

Location of Nance County in Nebraska

Nance County, Nebraska, United States, has 11 properties and districts listed on the National Register of Historic Places.

The locations of National Register properties and districts for which the latitude and longitude coordinates are included below may be seen in a map.

This National Park Service list is complete through NPS recent listings posted October 30, 2026.

== Current listings ==
	Name on the Register	Image	Date listed	Location	City or town	Description
1	Burkett Archeological Site	Burkett Archeological Site	July 12, 1974 (#74001133)	Atop the bluff in the northern half of Section 29, Township 17 North, Range 4 West, 4 miles (6.4 km) southwest of Genoa; 41°25′06″N 97°48′00″W	Genoa	
2	Cottonwood Creek Archeological Site	Cottonwood Creek Archeological Site	October 18, 1974 (#74001130)	Address Restricted	Belgrade	
3	Cunningham Archeological Site		February 13, 1975 (#75001099)	Address Restricted	Fullerton	
4	Evangelical United Brethren Church	Evangelical United Brethren Church	September 4, 2013 (#13000678)	501 Broadway St. 41°21′39″N 97°58′06″W	Fullerton	
5	Fullerton Archeological Site		November 1, 1974 (#74001131)	Address Restricted	Fullerton	
6	Genoa Site	Genoa Site	October 15, 1970 (#70000373)	Address Restricted	Genoa	
7	Horse Creek Pawnee Village	Horse Creek Pawnee Village	July 12, 1974 (#74001132)	Address Restricted	Fullerton	
8	Moses Merrill Baptist Camp	Moses Merrill Baptist Camp	April 14, 2004 (#04000295)	Northwest of Fullerton; 41°22′16″N 97°59′06″W	Fullerton	
9	Pawnee Mission and Burnt Village Archeological Site	Pawnee Mission and Burnt Village Archeological Site	August 7, 1974 (#74001134)	Address Restricted	Genoa	
10	U.S. Indian Industrial School	U.S. Indian Industrial School	May 22, 1978 (#78001706)	Nebraska Highway 22; 41°26′58″N 97°43′27″W	Genoa	
11	Wright Site		August 14, 1973 (#73001069)	Above Beaver Creek, 1.5 miles (2.4 km) southwest of downtown Genoa; 41°26′20″N 97°45′24″W	Genoa	

== See also ==
- List of National Historic Landmarks in Nebraska
- National Register of Historic Places listings in Nebraska
