= List of Indian agencies in Nebraska =

Several Indian agencies were established in the nineteenth century in the U.S. State of Nebraska and operated by the United States Bureau of Indian Affairs to serve Native American tribes.

== Red Cloud Agency ==
The United States established Fort Robinson nearby in 1874 to protect the agency, established to serve the Oglala Lakota Sioux. The agency was named after the chief Red Cloud.

== Spotted Tail Agency ==
When the agency was established in 1873, the Brulé Sioux moved to this location overlooking Beaver Creek, near present-day Hay Springs. The agency built storehouses, an issue building, a carpentry shop, a sawmill, stables, and other structures to serve the Sioux community. Camp Sheridan was established in 1874 to guard the agency, with permanent facilities built in 1875, including over thirty frame and brick structures. Following removal of the Brulé to the Rosebud Agency (later the Rosebud Indian Reservation) in South Dakota, activity declined and the US abandoned Camp Sheridan in 1880.

== Missouri River Indian Agency ==
Located at Fontenelle's Post, a former fur trading post, the Missouri River Indian Agency was also called the Upper Missouri Agency, the Bellevue Agency, and the Council Bluffs Agency. The Upper Missouri Agency, established in 1819, had responsibility for all the Indians living in a very large area of the Northern Plains of the United States along the Missouri River. The exact boundaries of its jurisdiction were not defined. It was re-established in 1837 for the Otoe, Missouria, Omaha, and Pawnee, who were some of the Native American peoples previously assigned to the Upper Missouri Agency. Between 1849 and 1851, the Council Bluffs Agency was reduced to a subagency and was discontinued in 1856, after the Omaha ceded their lands by treaty and moved on to their reservation in northeast Nebraska.

Its agents were John Dougherty, serving from April 13, 1837-1839; Joseph V. Hamilton, serving from June 27, 1839-1841; Daniel Miller, from October 22, 1841; Jonathan Bean, from July 25, 1845-1846; John Miller from July 22, 1846-1849; John E. Barrow, a subagent, from April 13, 1849-1851; John E. Barrow from June 30, 1851-1853; James M. Gatewood from April 18, 1853-1854; and George Hepner May 19, 1854.

James Gatewood worked with a council of 60 Omaha chiefs in early 1854 to draft a treaty for their cession of most of their land in the area. The national office of the BIA did not like his version and forced many changes when a smaller Omaha delegation of seven chiefs, chosen by their people, and an interpreter, went to Washington DC for signing of the treaty in 1854. The BIA replaced Gatewood as agent.

== Otoe Agency ==
Founded in 1856, in the Blue River Valley in southern Nebraska, this agency was responsible for the Oto, Missouria, and Pawnee of the region. In 1859, the Pawnee received their own agent.

The Otoe and Missouria moved to the Kansas-Nebraska border. In 1881, the Otoe Agency moved to Red Rock in Indian Territory, when the US removed the Otoe-Missouria to that area for settlement on a reservation. Its agents included Jesse W. Griest, serving from April 1, 1873; Robert S. Gardner from June 16, 1880; and Lewellyn E. Woodin from July 21, 1880.

== Santee Agency ==
Moved from Michigan Territory in 1866, this agency was located on the Niobrara Reservation in what became northeast Nebraska. It was responsible for the Santee Sioux, also formerly known as Eastern Dakota.

== Winnebago and Omaha Agency/Agencies ==
This consolidated agency operated at varying points with varying responsibilities from 1876 to 1933. Located in Macy and Winnebago, the Winnebago agency originally moved to the state in 1865. The Omaha agency had been located there since 1854.

== Pawnee Agency ==
Located at Genoa, this agency was located on the Pawnee Reservation and included the Genoa Indian Industrial School. The Pawnee Agency was established in 1859 for the Pawnee. They had previously been assigned to the Otoe Agency since 1856, and to Council Bluffs Agency prior to that. It was located at Genoa, Nebraska until 1875, when it was moved to the new Pawnee Reservation in Oklahoma Territory after the US accomplished Pawnee removal from Nebraska.

== Ponca Agency ==
This agency served the Ponca from 1859 to 1877 at the Ponca Reservation. It moved with the majority of Ponca to the Oklahoma Territory in 1877, who were removed despite their wish to stay in Nebraska and have land assigned with the Omaha, to whom they were closely related and intermarried.

== Great Nemaha Agency ==
"The Great Nemaha Agency became a full agency in 1851, and the Kickapoo formerly assigned to the Fort Leavenworth Agency were moved to Great Nemaha. A separate Kickapoo Agency was established in 1855 for the Kickapoo Indians and some Pottawatomi who lived with the Kickapoo.

Between 1854 and 1861, the Iowa Tribe of Kansas and Nebraska and the Sac & Fox Nation of Missouri in Kansas and Nebraska gave up lands except small reserves on the Kansas-Nebraska border. In 1858, a new Great Nemaha Agency headquarters was built on the Iowa Reserve, just east of Great Nemaha River and north of the Kansas-Nebraska line." Later activities were consolidated in Kansas.

== See also ==
- Native American tribes in Nebraska
- History of Nebraska
