= Evangelical United Brethren Church (disambiguation) =

Evangelical United Brethren Church may refer to:

- Evangelical United Brethren Church, a religious denomination

or it may refer to specific notable church buildings:

- Evangelical United Brethren Church (Fullerton, Nebraska), listed on the NRHP in Nebraska
- Evangelical United Brethren Church (Dayton, Oregon), listed on the NRHP in Oregon
- Evangelical United Brethren Church (Watertown, South Dakota), listed on the NRHP in South Dakota
