= Ponca Restoration Act 1990 =

Federal recognition of Native American tribe

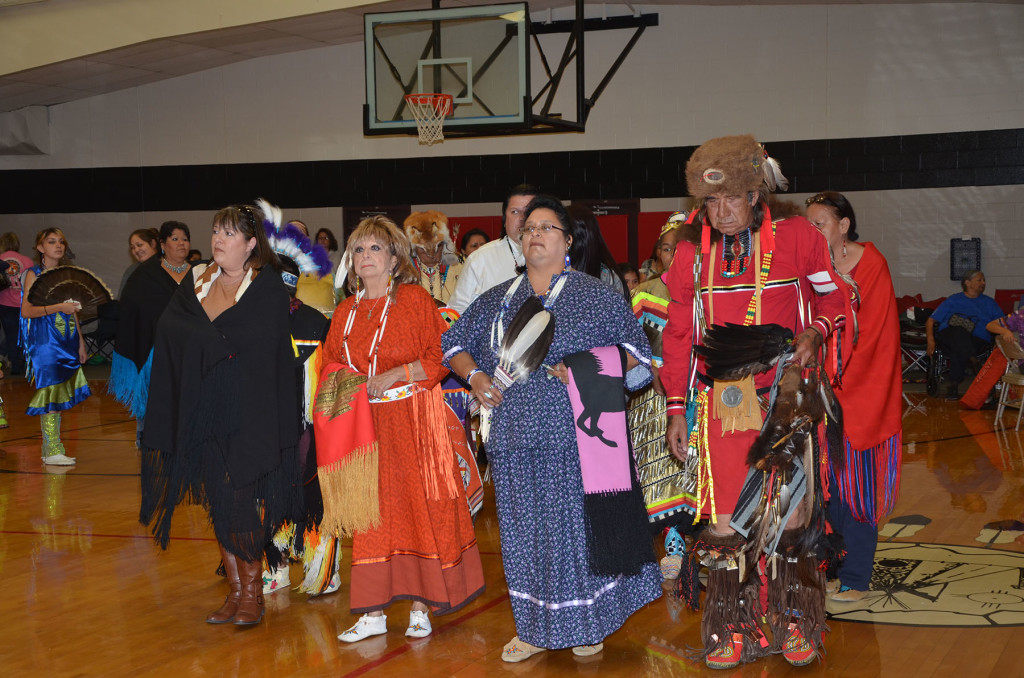
Traditional dances at Ponca Powwow Norfolk

The Ponca Tribe of Nebraska Restoration Act (Public Law 101-484) is a United States federal law enacted on October 31, 1990, that restored federal recognition to the Ponca Tribe of Nebraska. The act reversed the Tribe's termination, which had been carried out in 1962 by the Federal government of the United States as part of the Indian termination policy to assimilate Native Americans. With the enactment of this legislation, the Ponca Tribe of Nebraska was restored to federal recognition as a sovereign Tribal nation, qualifying for federal programs and services, and reaffirming the right to self governance.

== Background ==
The Ponca Tribe is an Indigenous Native American group originally from the Niobrara River region in what is now northeastern Nebraska. By the mid 19th century, the Ponca had experienced multiple forced relocations with the most significant in 1877 leading to the trial of Standing Bear v Crook. Along with thousands of other Native Americans in the United States, the Ponca were removed to Indian Territory (present-day Oklahoma) under duress and despite having signed treaties securing lands in Nebraska. Throughout time, around 225 Ponca members chose to remain north in Nebraska, leading to the formation of two distinct Federally recognized tribes of the Ponca people; The Ponca Tribe of Nebraska and Ponca Tribe of Indians of Oklahoma. The Ponca Tribe of Nebraska would be known as the Northern Ponca and re-establish a headquarters near the former Ponca Reservation, Niobrara, Nebraska.

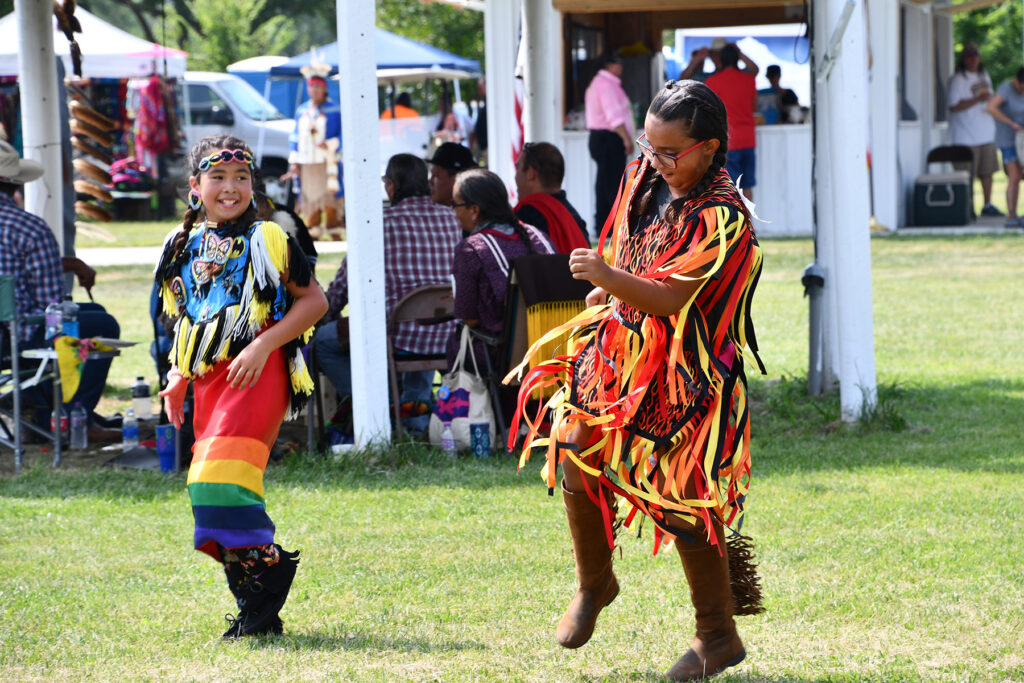
Traditional dances at Ponca Powwow Niobrara

In the mid 1940s to the 1960s, the United States Federal Government pursued a policy known as Indian termination policy. This policy intended to assimilate Native Americans into mainstream society by dissolving reservations and ending federal recognition of certain Tribes. Under the Indian termination policy, the Ponca Tribe of Nebraska termination would be enacted in 1962, with the complete termination in 1966, despite the Tribe's longstanding presence in the region.

Indian termination policy had severe consequences. The Ponca lost federal support, landholdings, and recognition of Tribal sovereignty in the United States. The Northern Ponca struggled and seen decline without access to healthcare, education, or housing assistance which was previously provided by the Federal government. Cultural identity and much of the Tribe's cultural heritage would be forever lost. The Tribe would help mitigate termination consequences by working with the federal government to help facilitate the division of Tribe assets. S. 3174 would divide tribal assets among the Ponca members, dissolve their remaining land and holdings, and terminate their status meaning the Ponca no longer existed.

Over the following decades, Ponca leaders and Tribal members would embark on a vigorous program of educating and lobbying state and federal legislature to regain federal recognition. Even though Congress recognized termination as a failed policy, it required each terminated Tribe bear the burden of individually petitioning for the reversal of that status. Between 1986 and 1987, the Ponca Tribe of Nebraska would form the Northern Ponca Restoration Committee for this purpose.

== Ponca Restoration Act ==
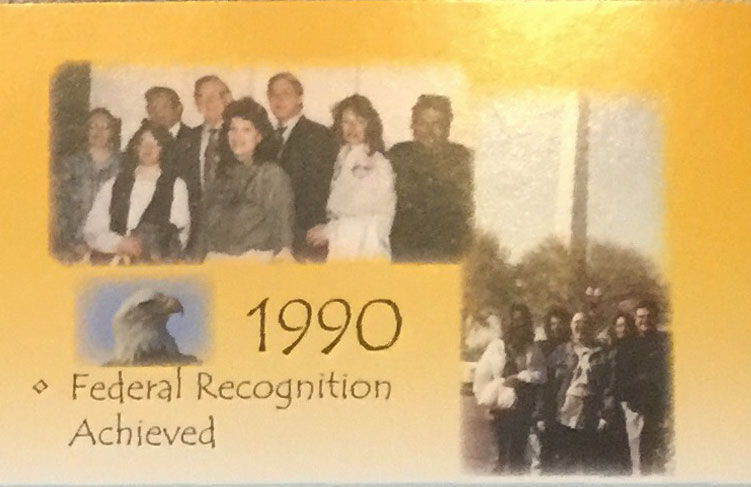
Northern Ponca Restoration Committee

Congress established six administrative criteria that all terminated Tribe's had to fulfill for restoration. Looking at other Tribe's being restored the Ponca Tribe decided it would be of best interest to gain support from the Nebraska Unicameral before approaching the United States Congress. In 1988, the Ponca Tribe successfully gained support and "state recognition" from the Nebraska Legislature. With state recognition and support for federal recognition the Northern Ponca Restoration Committee drafted language for federal restoration of the Northern Ponca Tribe in 1989. In 1989, after gaining support from Senators J. James Exon and Bob Kerrey, the Ponca Restoration Act was introduced in the United States Senate but would face a challenge in the United States House of Representatives with the fear that the Ponca's would one day choose to re-establish a reservation in northeastern Nebraska. After language was added to specifically deny the Ponca Tribe the ability to establish a reservation, the bill passed unanimously. The Ponca Restoration Act was completed on October 31, 1990, when President George H. W. Bush signed the Ponca Restoration Act into law.

== Effects and Legacy ==
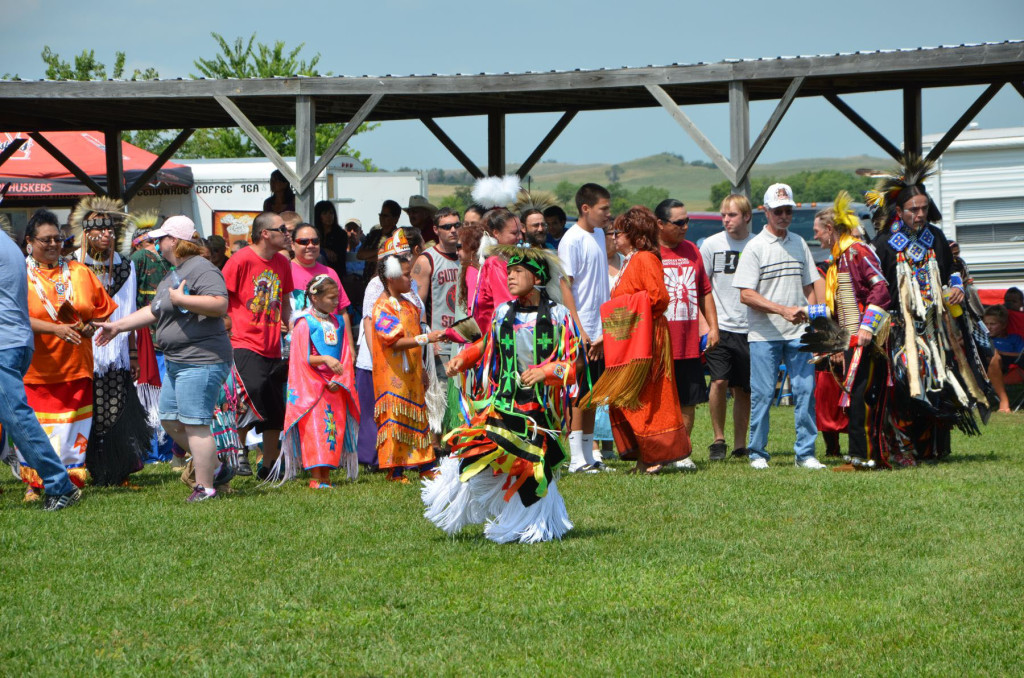
Traditional dances at Ponca Powwow Niobrara

Since the Ponca Restoration Act, the Ponca Tribe of Nebraska has slowly rebuilt what has been taken by finding their Tribal identity and bringing back the traditional Ponca language and ways of life. The Ponca Tribe of Nebraska has added over 126 employees and five office sites across the fifteen county service area in Nebraska, Iowa, and South Dakota. Today with federal recognition, the Ponca Tribe of Nebraska is able to provide an array of services to enrolled Ponca members including healthcare, social services, education, housing, and behavioral health while still reaffirming the right to self govern under the Indian Self- Determination Act. The Ponca Restoration Act ultimately has helped the Ponca Tribe of Nebraska create economic development and pathways to overcome the brutal and ruthless history the Tribe has encountered for centuries. With this legislation the Tribe is able to continue rebuilding, growing and shaping the rich Ponca culture that we know and see today.
