= Merchiston (disambiguation) =

Merchiston is an area of Edinburgh in Scotland.

Merchiston may also refer to:

- Merchiston Tower (or Merchiston Castle), a 15th-century tower now part of Edinburgh Napier University campus
- Merchiston Castle School, a private school in Edinburgh often referred to simply as "Merchiston"
- Merchiston International School, a private international school in Shenzhen, China, an overseas campus of Merchiston Castle School
- Merchiston Preparatory School, a boys' preparatory school in Pietermaritzburg, South Africa, inspired by the Edinburgh school
- Merchiston railway station, a former railway station in the Merchiston area of Edinburgh
- Merchiston Park, a former football ground in Falkirk, home of East Stirlingshire F.C.
- Merchiston, Nebraska, a community in the United States
