= Timber Creek Township =

Timber Creek Township may refer to:

- Timber Creek Township, Marshall County, Iowa
- Timber Creek Township, Nance County, Nebraska
