= Toussaint Charbonneau =

Canadian explorer, fur trapper (1767–1843)

- Born: March 21, 1767; Boucherville, Quebec
- Died: August 12, 1843 (aged 76); Fort Mandan, Dakota Territory
- Occupations: Explorer, fur trapper
- Spouses: Sacagawea, Otter Woman; 3 others
- Children: 2, including Jean Baptiste Charbonneau

Toussaint Charbonneau (French pronunciation: [tu.sɛ̃ ʃaʁ.bɔ.no]; March 21, 1767 – August 12, 1843) was a French Canadian explorer; Charbonneau was the oldest member of the Lewis and Clark Expedition's permanent party, and he would outlive most of his fellows as he followed the rigorous life of a fur traders, guide, and interpreter. In fact, the fur trade had put him in place to meet the captains and join their expedition. Born in Canada to French parents in 1767, Toussaint Charbonneau was a trapper and trader for the North West Company, a Canadian fur-trading concern. Charbonneau's first appearance in the historical record – and also the first blemish on his reputation – come from the records of that company. He is best known for his role in the Lewis and Clark Expedition as the husband of Sacagawea.

== Early years ==
Charbonneau was born in Boucherville, located in what became the province of Québec (near Montréal) around 1759 or 1767. Boucherville was a community with strong links to exploration and the fur trade. It has been claimed that he was of French and Iroquois ancestry, though there is no evidence to support this. His genealogy compiled by the PRDH project at the Université de Montréal shows a strictly French ancestry. His paternal great-grandmother Marguerite de Noyon was the sister of Jacques de Noyon, who had explored the region around Kaministiquia, modern Thunder Bay, Ontario, in 1688. In the late 1790s, Charbonneau became a fur trader who lived among the Hidatsa and Mandan native tribes.

For a time, Charbonneau worked as a fur trapper with the North West Company (NWC), assigned to the Pine Fort on the Assiniboine River in what later became Manitoba. The North West Company was founded to compete with the dominant Hudson's Bay Company, an English company that employed many Frenchmen. This company pushed west, which allowed it to trade with the Mandan and Hidatsa native tribes. John MacDonell, the recorder of one of their expeditions, first noted Charbonneau in their historical journal. After several routine mentions of Charbonneau, MacDonell wrote on May 30, 1795: "Toussaint. Charbonneau was stabbed at the Manitou-a-banc end of the Portage la Prairie, Manitoba in the act of committing a Rape upon her Daughter by an old Saultier woman with a Canoe Awl— a fate he highly deserved for his brutality— It was with difficulty he could walk back over the portage."

While living among the Hidatsa people, Charbonneau purchased or won a Shoshone girl: Sacagawea ('Bird Woman') from the Hidatsa. The Hidatsa had captured Sacagawea on one of their annual raiding and hunting parties to the west. Sacagawea may have had little choice in the matter, or she may have chosen to go with Charbonneau because doing so was preferable to her previous position. When Charbonneau married Sacagawea in 1804, he was already married to Otter Woman, another Shoshone woman. Charbonneau eventually considered these women to be his wives, though whether they were bound through Native American custom or through common-law marriage is undetermined. By the summer of 1804, Sacagawea was pregnant with their first child.

== Lewis and Clark Expedition ==
In November 1804, Meriwether Lewis and William Clark came to the area, built Fort Mandan, and recruited members to the Corps of Discovery. Originally, Lewis and Clark were working with a Frenchman named Larocque, however the relationship became increasingly tense. This led Lewis and Clark to recruit Charbonneau who worked under Laroque. Charbonneau was asked to join the expedition as a translator. While Charbonneau could speak French and some Hidatsa, Lewis and Clark were more enthusiastic about having two Shoshone women join them. With Charbonneau, Sacagawea, and Otter Woman's skills combined, the expedition gained the ability to speak Hidatsa and Shoshone. They hired Charbonneau on November 4, and his wives moved into Fort Mandan with Charbonneau a week later.

On February 11, 1805 at the fort, Charbonneau and Sacagawea's son Jean-Baptiste was born. William Clark nicknamed the baby Pomp.

In the winter, as the expedition was being prepared, Charbonneau had second thoughts about his role with Lewis and Clark. This was because Charbonneau had received gifts from the North West Company upon news of his newborn son. The gifts given to him included: two arms' length of scarlet cloth and one of blue, a pair of corduroy coats, one vest, a length of red cloth decorated with bars, 200 musket balls, a supply of powder, three knives, and some tobacco. This upset Lewis and Clark as they saw these gifts as a bribe for Charbonneau to work with the company to deter American ventures in the fur trade. On top of being dissatisfied with the requirement to stand guard and perform manual labor amongst other tasks, he was also being treated as a traitor by his new employers. On March 12, 1805, he quit the expedition. However, on March 17 he returned and apologized, requesting to re-join the company; he was re-hired the following day. His performance during the journey was mixed: Meriwether Lewis called him "a man of no peculiar merit", and many historians have painted Charbonneau in a distinctly unfavorable light. One of the most well-known anecdotes about Charbonneau is the incident with the "white pirogue." On May 14, 1805, the pirogue guided by Charbonneau was hit by a gust of wind and lost control. Charbonneau panicked and nearly capsized the boat, which would have meant the loss of valuable equipment and papers. It was only with the help of his wife, Sacagawea, that these important items were saved. Meriwether Lewis was irate, writing that Charbonneau was "perhaps the most timid waterman in the world." Charbonneau was also known for his short temper with his wives. On August 14, 1805, he struck Sacagawea in a fit of anger and was reprimanded by Clark. This occasion, in addition to committing rape earlier in his life, gave Charbonneau a bad reputation.

Charbonneau, however, did make several contributions to the success of the expedition. He was helpful when the expedition encountered French trappers from Canada as he shared their language. He also was the cook for the expedition. Several members of the party praised his boudin blanc, a boiled and fried sausage made from bison meat. Additionally, his skill in striking a bargain came in handy when the expedition was in strong need for horses and was at a Shoshone encampment, the people of his wives.

Charbonneau and his family stayed with the Lewis and Clark expedition until August 1806. He was paid $500.33, plus a horse and a lodge, for his nineteen months with the expedition. In addition to the payment, William Clark wrote a parting letter to Charbonneau, inviting a continued relationship. He even asked if it was possible for Jean Baptiste to stay with the expedition to be raised by Clark.

== Life after the expedition ==
Clark offered to set up Charbonneau and his family in St. Louis after the expedition. Charbonneau initially declined Clark's offer, as he preferred life with the Mandan and Hidatsa. However, the family relocated to St. Louis in 1809 so that Jean Baptiste could be educated. Charbonneau bought land from Clark and briefly took up farming. He gave it up after a few months, selling the land back to Clark for 100 dollars. He also left Sacagawea and his two sons Toussaint and Jean Baptiste in Clark's protection. In April, 1811, Charbonneau started working for Henry M. Brackenridge, an explorer headed up the Missouri River. In Charbonneau's company was his older wife, Otter Woman.

He then took a job with Manuel Lisa's Missouri Fur Company, and was stationed at Fort Manuel Lisa Trading Post in present-day North Dakota. During this time, Sacagawea was pregnant and gave birth to a girl named Lisette. Shortly after the birth, Sacagawea died on December 20, 1812. Lisette was taken back to St. Louis to live with Jean Baptiste. The following year Charbonneau signed over formal custody of his son Jean Baptiste and daughter Lisette to William Clark.

From 1811 to 1838, Charbonneau also worked for the Upper Missouri Agency's Indian Bureau (a federal agency) as a translator. He earned from $300 to $400 per year from the government. He may have gained this position by the patronage of William Clark, who was from 1813 the governor of the Missouri Territory; upon Clark's death, Charbonneau's employment with the government came to an abrupt halt. Surviving records show that Charbonneau was widely disliked by others in the Missouri Territory. Part of the reason for this may be his casual attitude toward employment: he was variously hired by Lisa's Missouri Fur Company and by John Jacob Astor's American Fur Company, bitter rivals. He is also said to have abandoned another employer, James Kipp, while on a fur expedition in 1834.

Charbonneau is known to have had a total of five wives, all young Native American women whom he married when they were sixteen years old or younger. He may have had more wives who have been lost to the record, however. His last known wife, an Assiniboine girl, was 14 when she married him in 1837; he was more than 70 years old.

=== Death ===
While his exact death date is not known, Charbonneau probably died in 1843, because that is the year Jean-Baptiste settled his father's estate. It is generally accepted that he died and was buried in Fort Mandan, North Dakota, but some believe he is buried in Richwoods, Missouri with a headstone marked "Toussaint Charboneau, 1781–1866" [sic]. While these dates are wrong, people in Richwoods claim to be descendants of Charbonneau.
