= Genoa Township =

Genoa Township may refer to the following places in the United States:

- Genoa Township, DeKalb County, Illinois
- Genoa Township, Michigan
- Genoa Township, Nance County, Nebraska
- Genoa Township, Delaware County, Ohio
