= Native American tribes in Nebraska =

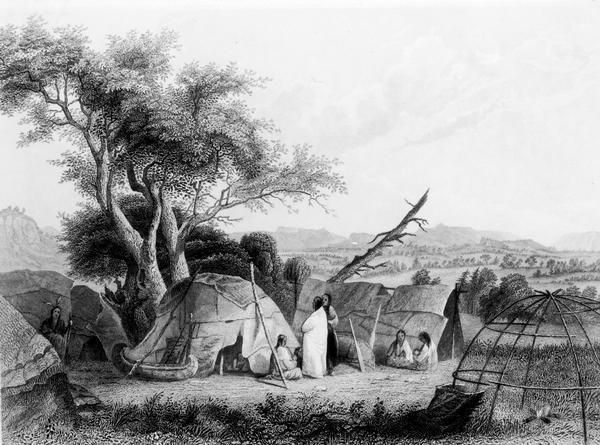
An 1852 illustration of a Winnebago family encampment.

Native American tribes in the U.S. state of Nebraska have been Plains Indians, descendants of succeeding cultures of indigenous peoples who have occupied the area for thousands of years. More than 15 historic tribes have been identified as having lived in, hunted in, or otherwise occupied territory within the current state boundaries.

The 19th-century history of the state included the establishment of eight Indian reservations, including a half-breed tract. Today six tribes, (Omaha, Winnebago, Ponca, Iowa, Santee Sioux, Sac and Fox), have reservations in Nebraska. In 2006 American Indian and Alaska Native persons comprised one percent of the state's population. Towns at the northern border also have relations within reservations within South Dakota.

== Tribes ==
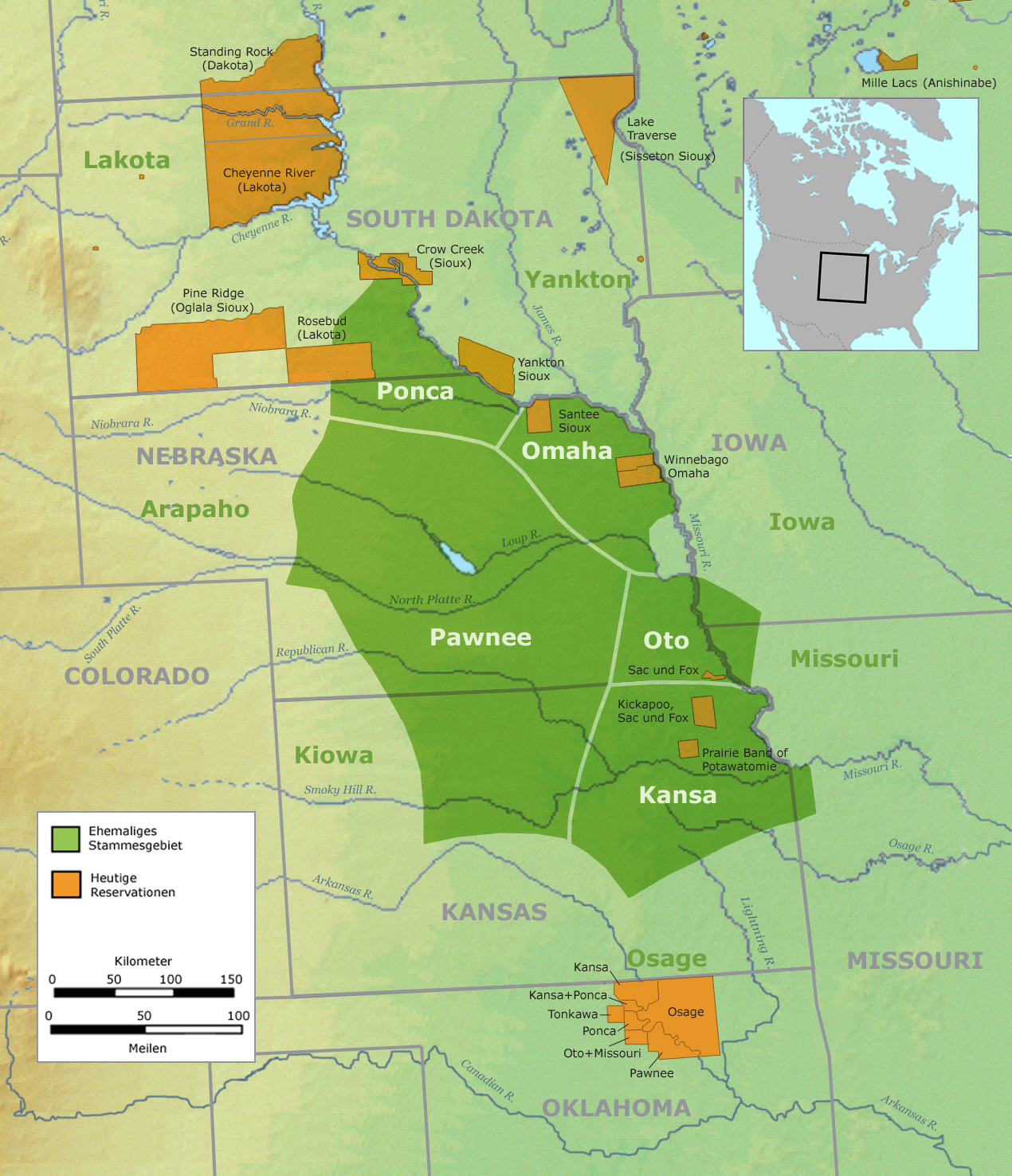
Tribal territory of several tribes in Nebraska

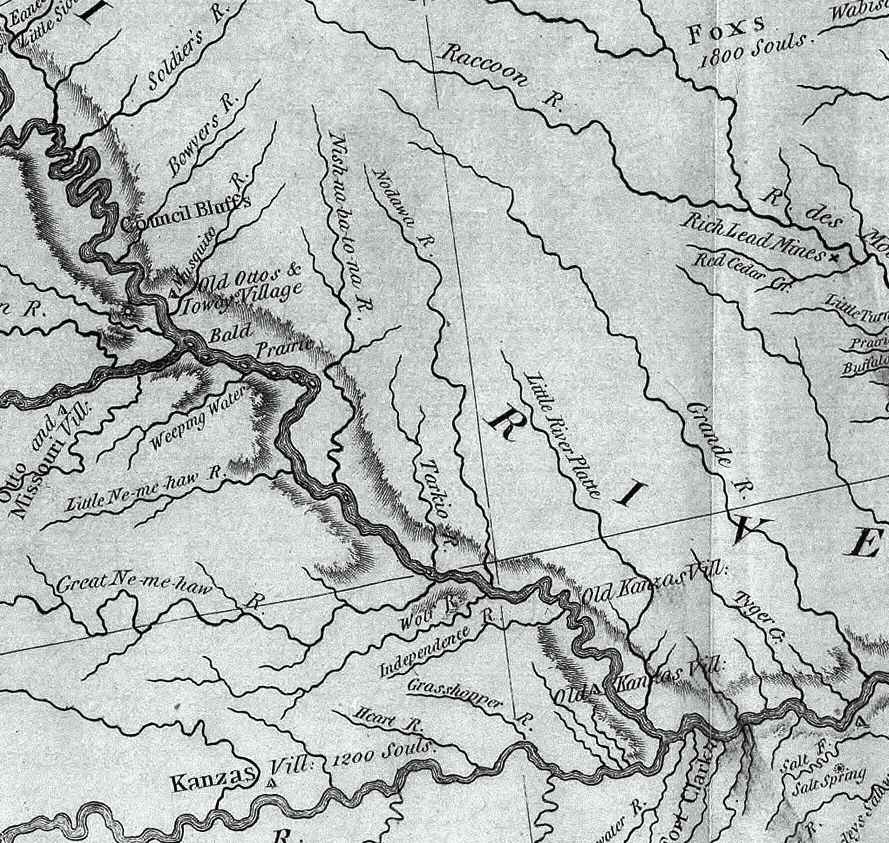
This section from the Lewis and Clark map of 1804 shows period Indian villages in southwest Iowa, southeast Nebraska, and northwest Missouri. The Otoe, Iowa, Missouri and Kansas tribes are specifically identified.

Several language groups were represented by the American Indians in present-day Nebraska. The Algonquian-speaking Arapaho lived for more than 1,000 years throughout the western part of Nebraska. In a prehistoric period; Nebraska was home to the Arikara, who spoke a Caddoan language, as did the Pawnee; after 1823 they returned from present-day North Dakota to live with the Skidi Pawnee for two years. The Kiowa once occupied western Nebraska. The eastern range of the Algonquian-speaking Cheyenne included western Nebraska, after the Comanche who had formerly lived in the territory had moved south toward Texas.

The Great Sioux Nation, including the Ihanktowan-Ihanktowana and the Lakota located to the north and west, used Nebraska as a hunting and skirmish ground, although they did not have any long-term settlements in the state.

The Omaha belong to the Siouan-language family of the Dhegihan branch, and have been located along the Missouri River in northeastern Nebraska since the late 17th century, after having migrated from eastern areas together with other tribes. Originally living along the Ohio and Wabash rivers to the east, the Omaha, along with the Dhegihan Ponca, moved into Nebraska in the 1670s. Other Siouan-Dheigihan tribes who moved west from the Ohio River about then were the Osage, Kansa and Quapaw, who settled to the southwestern part of the territory. At that point the Ponca split, and the Omaha settled on Bow Creek in present-day Cedar County. Before 1700, the Iowa, a Siouan people whose language was Chiwere, moved from the Red Pipestone Quarry into Nebraska.

The Omaha separated from the Ponca at the mouth of White River in present-day South Dakota. The latter moved west into the Black Hills, but later they rejoined the Omaha. The Ponca settled at the Nemaha River while the Omaha became established to the south at Bow Creek.

By the Treaty of 1854, the Omaha ceded most of their land to the United States. They moved to a reservation within two years and later shared their land with the Winnebago. Also known by their autonym of Ho-Chunk, the latter moved to the reservation in 1862 after an uprising by the Lakota. The US government later granted land within the Omaha reservation boundaries to the Ho-Chunk, whose descendants still live there.

In 1877 the United States forced the Ponca tribe to move south to Indian Territory in Oklahoma, although they had wanted to stay on a reservation in Nebraska. The failure of the government to support the people adequately after the removal and poor conditions on the reservation led to many deaths. The US Army's detention of some Ponca leaders who returned to Nebraska was challenged in court and the case followed nationally by many Americans. It resulted in the landmark civil rights case of Standing Bear v. Crook (1872), which established that American Indians shared in certain rights under the constitution. Following the court case, the US assigned the tribe some land in Nebraska. Today the Ponca Tribe of Nebraska live in Knox County; another part of the people live on their federally recognized reservation in Oklahoma.

The Missouri lived south of the Platte River and, along with the Otoe, met with the Lewis and Clark Expedition at the Council Bluff. Like the Iowa, both tribes are part of the Chiwere branch of the Siouan-language family. In 1804 the Otoe had a town on the south side of the Platte River not far from its mouth on the Missouri. On March 3, 1881 the tribe sold all of their land in Nebraska to the federal government and moved to Indian Territory (now Oklahoma).

In 1830 the Meskwaki and the Sauk, distinct Algonquian-speaking tribes that were closely related, ceded a great deal of land in Nebraska to the United States. Today the tribes are federally recognized together.

The Pawnee, which included four tribes, lived in villages along the Platte River. In the mid-nineteenth century, they ceded all of their lands in Nebraska to the United States except one reservation; in 1876 they surrendered this tract and moved to Indian Territory. The battle of Massacre Canyon on August 5, 1873, was the last major battle between the Pawnee and the Sioux. About 70 Pawnee were killed, mostly women and children.

== Loss of land ==
Between 1857 and 1862 tribes were forced to give up, or ceded, land for sale in Nebraska in five separate treaties with the U.S. government in the years immediately leading up to the passage of the Homestead Act. In 1854 Logan Fontenelle was chief and also translated the negotiations that led the Omaha to the first of five cessions of their lands to the United States. During the same negotiations, the tribe agreed to move to their present reservation to the north in Thurston County. The Otoe and Missouri tribes negotiated the last of four treaties that same year, and the Pawnee, Arapaho and Cheyenne all signed treaties within a few years.

In the 1870s the Nebraska Legislature petitioned the U.S. Congress for the extinction of the original holders' land rights in the state by drafting the following statement:

Whereas, the Indians now on special reservations in Nebraska hold and occupy valuable and important tracts of land, which while occupied will not be developed and improved; and Whereas the demand for lands which will be improved and made useful, are such that these Indian lands should no longer be held, but should be allowed to pass into the hands of enterprising and industrious citizens; ... [W]e urge upon our delegation in Congress to secure the removal of all Indians now on special reservations in Nebraska to other ... localities, where their presence will not retard settlements by the whites.

=== Tribes and treaties ===
There are 18 separate treaties between American Indian tribes and the U.S. government for land in Nebraska which were negotiated between 1825 and 1892. By the 1850s the Pawnee, Omaha, Oto-Missouri, Ponca, Lakota, and Cheyenne were the main Great Plains tribes living in the Nebraska Territory.

U.S. government treaties with American Indian tribes for land in Nebraska.
| Tribe | Year | Notes |
|---|---|---|
| Kansas | 1825 | Ceded much of severe southeast Nebraska. |
| Oto | 1830 | The severe southeastern corner of Nebraska. |
| Oto | 1833 | Southeast Nebraska, near the mouth of the Platte, included land where the Moses Merill Mission was located. |
| Pawnee | 1833 | South-central Nebraska. |
| Pawnee | 1848 | A small tract along the Platte River in central Nebraska. |
| Omaha | 1854 | Almost all of east-central and northeast Nebraska. |
| Oto and Missouri | 1854 | East-central Nebraska immediately south of the Platte River. |
| Pawnee | 1857 | All of north-central Nebraska between the Platte River and the South Dakota border. |
| Arapaho and Cheyenne | 1861 | All of southwestern and some of west-central Nebraska south of the North Platte River. |
| Omaha | 1865 | A small parcel of land compromising 1/4 of their reservation. |
| Lakota | 1875 | All of west-central Nebraska north of the North Platte River. |
| Pawnee | 1875 | A small tract north of the Platte River that included the land that became the Genoa Indian Industrial School. |
| Lakota, Northern Cheyenne and Arapaho | 1876 | All of severe northwestern Nebraska. |
| Omaha | 1882 | Two parcels of land in two treaties comprising 1/2 of their reservation lands, including land for the Winnebago reservation. |
| Lakota | 1892 | Ceded a parcel of land including Pine Ridge, Nebraska. |

== Federal recognition ==
Today the United States government recognizes several tribes in Nebraska. They include the Iowa Tribe of Kansas and Nebraska, the Omaha Tribe of Nebraska, the Ponca Tribe of Nebraska, the Sac & Fox Nation of Missouri in Kansas and Nebraska, the Santee Sioux Tribe of the Santee Reservation of Nebraska, and the Winnebago Tribe of Nebraska.

== Reservations ==
Indian reservations in Nebraska currently include land of the Ioway, Santee Sioux, Omaha, Sac and Fox, Winnebago, and Ponca. The Omaha were forced to cede their Boone County lands to the U.S. government in 1854. The Pawnee were forced to gave up their Boone County lands in 1857. Nance County was a Pawnee reservation until 1875, when harassment by the whites and Sioux helped convince by force the Pawnee to relocate to Oklahoma. The Oto, Omaha, and Ioway were forced to cede much of their land to the U.S. government in 1854, resulting in moving onto reservations in eastern Nebraska. That year the Nebraska Territory was organized and opened to settlement.

Indian reservations in Nebraska.
| Reservation name | Tribe | Established | Size | History | Notes |
|---|---|---|---|---|---|
| Niobrara Reservation | Santee Sioux | 1863 | 41,000 acres (17,000 ha) | Established by Act of March 3, 1863 (12 Stat. 819); treaty of April 29, 1868 (15 Stat. 637); Executive orders, February 27, 1866, November 16, 1867, August 31, 1869, December 31, 1873, and February 9, 1885. 32,875.75 acres (133.0434 km^{2}) were selected as homesteads, 38,908.01 acres (157.4551 km^{2}) as allotments, find 1,130.70 acres (4.5758 km^{2}) for Indian agency, school, and mission purposes; unratified agreement of October 17, 1882. | The tribal offices are located in Niobrara, with reservation lands in Knox County. |
| Omaha Reservation | Omaha | 1854 | 12,421 acres (5,027 ha) | Established by Treaty of March 16, 1854 (10 Stat. 1043); selection by Indians with the President's approval, May 11, 1855; treaty of March 6, 1865 (14 Stat. 667); act of June 10, 1872 (17 Stat. 391); act of June 22, 1874 (18 Stat. 170); deed to the Winnebago, dated July 31, 1874: act of August 7, 1882 (22 Stat. 341): act of March 3, 1893 (27 Stat. 612); 129,470 acres (523.9 km^{2}) allotted to 1,577 Indians; the residue, 12,421 acres (50.27 km^{2}), unallotted. | The reservation is located mostly in Thurston County, with sections in Cuming County and Burt County. The tribal council offices are in Macy, with the towns of Rosalie, Thurston, Pender and Walthill located in reservation boundaries. |
| Ogallala Sioux reservation | Ogallala Sioux | 1882 | 640 acres (260 ha) | Established by Executive order on January 24, 1882 and sold to the U.S. government in 1899. | |
| Oto Reservation | Oto | 1834 | 160,000 acres (65,000 ha) | Located near the Platte River in eastern Nebraska, the reservation was the site of the Moses Merrill Mission. It was completely sold to the U.S. government by 1884. | |
| Pawnee Reservation | Pawnee | 1833 | 19,200 acres (7,800 ha) | The Pawnee sold all of their land to the U.S. government by 1870. | Located along the Loup River. |
| Ponca Reservation | Ponca | 1858 | 27,500 acres (11,100 ha) | Established by Treaty of March 12, 1858 (12 Stat. 997), and supplemental treaty March 10, 1865 (14 Stat. 675); act of March 2, 1899 (25 Stat. 892). 27,202.08 acres (110.0829 km^{2}) were allotted to 167 Indians, and 160 acres (0.65 km^{2}) reserved and occupied by agency and school buildings. | The tribal council offices are located in Niobrara. This is also the location of the historic Ponca Fort called Nanza. |
| Sac and Fox Reservation | Sac and Fox | | 15,129 acres (6,122 ha) | | Located in southeastern Richardson County, Nebraska and northeastern Brown County, Kansas |
| Winnebago Reservation | Winnebago | 1863 | 1,711 acres (692 ha) | Established by Act of February 21, 1863 (12 Stat. 658): treaty of March 8, 1865 (14 Stat. 671): act of June 22, 1874 (18 Stat. 170); deed from the Omaha, dated July 31, 1874 (Indian Deeds, VI, 215). 106,040.82 acres (429.1320 km^{2}) were allotted to 1,200 Indians; 480 acres (1.9 km^{2}) reserved for agency, etc.; the residue, 1,710.80 acres (6.9234 km^{2}), unallotted. | The tribal council offices are located in the town of Winnebago. The city of Emerson, south of First Street, as well as Thurston, is located on the reservation, as well. The reservation occupies northern Thurston County, Nebraska, as well as southeastern Dixon County and Woodbury County, Iowa, and a small plot of off-reservation land of southern Craig Township in Burt County, Nebraska. |

=== Nemaha Half-Breed Reservation ===
The Nemaha Half-Breed Reservation was located between the Great and Little Nemaha rivers in Nemaha County. Because the Omaha and some other tribes had patrilineal systems, mixed-race children with white fathers had no place in the tribe; they were considered white. When it came to land allocation, they could not take part. At the same time, many frontier societies were prejudiced against such mixed-race people. The tribes asked the federal government to allot land to their mixed-race descendants, so they would be provided for. On September 10, 1860, Louis Neal received the first patent to own land there. Owners were never required to live on their property. After many sold their lands to whites, the formal designation of the reservation was eliminated in 1861. Descendants of mixed-blood pioneers still live in the area. The town of Barada is named in honor of Antoine Barada, an early settler who became a folk hero.

== Taxation ==
Generally, no Nebraska state taxes are imposed on an American Indian living on an Indian reservation located within the state of Nebraska. A Nebraska State Tax Exemption Identification Card and number will be issued by the Nebraska Department of Revenue, upon request to any "reservation Indian". A reservation Indian registering a motor vehicle at a location within the boundaries of an Indian reservation in Nebraska is exempt from the state motor vehicle tax but is not exempt from license and registration fees.

== Tribal administration ==
The Omaha Tribal Council office is located in Macy, with the Winnebago Tribal Council in nearby Winnebago. The offices of the Ponca Tribe of Nebraska and the Santee Sioux Tribal Council offices are in Niobrara. The Bureau of Indian Affairs office serving Nebraska is located in Aberdeen, South Dakota, while the Winnebago Agency office serves the Omaha and Winnebago.

== Contemporary issues ==
- Legal jurisdiction: In the 21st century, the Omaha have had continuing issues related to the western border of their reservation. They contend that the town of Pender, Nebraska is within the reservation and, since January 2007, have required its seven liquor merchants to get a tribal license and pay tribal sales taxes to operate. (The same conditions apply to such merchants in Rosalie and Walthill, both towns within the reservation.) A state court ruled that the western border was now located east of Pender, due to sales by individual Omaha over the years, but the tribe says that the state cannot redefine a border set by treaty with the United States government.
- Alcohol sales: The extraordinary level of beer sales at Whiteclay, Nebraska, a border town with four liquor stores and 14 residents, has given rise to an organized protest movement. The stores sell more than 4.5 million cans of beer annually, mostly to residents of the Pine Ridge Indian Reservation, who come two miles to buy alcoholic beverages, which are prohibited on the reservation. In February 2012, the Oglala Sioux Tribe filed suit for $500 million in damages against the four stores, their distributors and the beer manufacturers for costs of health care and rehabilitation related to alcoholism on the reservation.
- Casino gambling: The Winnebago Tribe has established a casino on its portion of the reservation located in Iowa. As a result of increased revenues, it has built a new school, hospital and provided numerous new jobs for tribal members.

== See also ==
- American Indian reservations in Nebraska (category)
- History of Nebraska
- Indigenous peoples of North America
- Indian Congress
- Nebraska Indian Community College
