= Niobrara Reservation =

The Niobrara Reservation is a former Indian Reservation in northeast Nebraska. It originally comprised lands for both the Santee Sioux and the Ponca, both Siouan-speaking tribes, near the mouth of the Niobrara River at its confluence with the Missouri River. In the late nineteenth century the United States government built a boarding school at the reservation for the Native American children in the region. By 1908 after allotment of plots to individual households of the tribes under the Dawes Act, 1,130.7 acres (4.576 km^{2}) were reserved for an agency, school and mission for a distinct Santee Sioux Reservation; the neighboring Ponca Reservation had only 160 acres (0.65 km^{2}) reserved for agency and school buildings.

== Santee Sioux ==
In 1884, John Lenger organized an all-Indian brass band on the Niobrara Reservation, the Santee Sioux Band. The group

demonstrated the musical ability of the Santee and presented them in a favorable light to their white neighbors. The band, led by Lenger, appeared at the Chicago World's Fair in 1893 and at the Trans-Mississippi Exposition in Omaha in 1898 .. [and] ... a special command performance for President Benjamin Harrison.

In 1890, Special Agent Reuben Sears described the land as unsuitable for farming without irrigation. "Perhaps half of the lands on this reservation would produce half a crop usually, while the other half is absolutely worthless, except for grazing, and 10 acres of this would be requisite to sustain 1 steer ... Timber is not abundant on this reservation. A sufficient quantity is found for fuel and posts, and for present use only." The Indian population at the Santee and Flandreau Agency at that time was 869. The Santee were described as a community that raised ponies and horses and lived in log or frame houses with barns, but did not like to keep milk cows or hogs. The Santee displayed aptitude for music and carpentry, and continued their customs of moving between summer and winter homes and "congregating together." Sears concluded that "The Santees are practically self-sustaining, although occupying an almost barren reservation."

Sears noted that the Santee simply stopped talking altogether if asked about their tribal history or religious beliefs. Their unwillingness to discuss their history is understandable, given that memories of the Dakota War of 1862 were still relatively fresh. After the war, thirty-nine Sioux were killed in a mass execution in Mankato, Minnesota, and a third of the Indians imprisoned at Camp McClellan died of disease; some of these survivors were sent to Nebraska. Three hundred of the women, children, and old men at the post-war internment camp on Pike Island, near Fort Snelling, Minnesota, died due to poor conditions; in May 1863 Dakota survivors were forced aboard steamboats and relocated to the drought-stricken Crow Creek Reservation. Many of the survivors of Crow Creek moved three years later to the Niobrara Reservation.

== Ponca ==
By contrast, the Ponca on the reservation numbered about 217 people, raised cattle and hogs, and were willing to discuss their history and religion. They lived in small frame houses, and had adequate rainfall and well water to maintain well-kept farms.

== 1930s archaeological survey ==
In the 1930s, an archeological survey was begun on the Ponca/Niobrara Reservation south of the Niobrara River and Lynch, Nebraska. In an effort to identify and save prehistoric artifacts before they were destroyed during agricultural development, the University of Nebraska and the Smithsonian Institution undertook a joint project. The team excavated a prehistoric Ponca village; the ten laborers on the project were paid by the Works Progress Administration of the Franklin D. Roosevelt administration during the Great Depression. The project was to survey, identify and protect ancient resources. The Ponca village included large circular homes up to sixty feet in diameter; their residences were located for almost two miles (3 km) along the south bank of the Niobrara River.

Niobrara Island was included in the original reservation.

== See also ==
- Native American tribes in Nebraska
- List of Indian agencies in Nebraska
- Sioux
