= Beaver Township, Nance County, Nebraska =

Beaver Township
- Township
- Location in Nance County
- Coordinates: 41°29′54″N 097°49′38″W
- Country: United States
- State: Nebraska
- County: Nance

Area
  - Total: 41.50 sq mi (107.49 km^{2})
  - Land: 41.50 sq mi (107.49 km^{2})
  - Water: 0 sq mi (0 km^{2}) 0%
- Elevation: 1,729 ft (527 m)

Population (2020)
  - Total: 104
  - Density: 2.51/sq mi (0.968/km^{2})
- GNIS feature ID: 0837871

Beaver Township is one of twelve townships in Nance County, Nebraska, United States. The population was 104 at the 2020 census. A 2021 estimate placed the township's population at 105.

== See also ==
- County government in Nebraska
