= Krakow, Nebraska =

Unincorporated community in Nebraska, U.S.

Coordinates: 41°23′41″N 97°45′09″W

Krakow is an unincorporated community in Nance County, Nebraska, in the United States.

== History ==
A large share of the early settlers being natives of Poland caused the name Krakow to be selected.
