= Otter Woman =

Shoshone woman

- Born: 1786–1788
- Disappeared: Missouri River
- Died: before 1814?
- Known for: Victim of kidnapping
- Spouse: Toussaint Charbonneau (m. 1812–1814?)

Otter Woman (born 1786–1788, died before 1814) was a Shoshone woman who was the wife of Smoked Lodge. Otter Woman was likely kidnapped by the Hidatsa and purchased by Toussaint Charbonneau, who is best known as the husband of Sacagawea. At the time of Sacagawea's abduction and sale to Charbonneau, Otter Woman was already living with Charbonneau as his wife. Charbonneau and Sacagawea were to gain fame as part of the Lewis and Clark Expedition, supported by the Corps of Discovery.

== Disappearance and aftermath ==
On November 4, 1804, Charbonneau visited the Corps of Discovery's camp on the bank of the Missouri River. Charbonneau, then an interpreter for the Hidatsa, had left a nearby hunting expedition to learn about a recent council between leaders of the Corps and local tribes. More importantly, he sought a job as the Corps' interpreter, informing the two captains that he spoke Hidatsa, and that his two wives spoke Shoshone. A diary from the Corps of Discovery refers to Otter Woman: "Today the wives of Charbono [sic] came to the Fort (Fort Mandan) bringing gifts of buffalo robes." After that single nameless mention, Otter Woman disappears from all but oral histories.

During the Corps' winter with the Mandan and Hidatsa people in 1803–1804, the journal keepers of the expedition were very clear that Charbonneau had two Shoshone-speaking wives. Four years after the Corps returned to St. Louis, Clark began working with Nicholas Biddle, editor of the expedition's journals, for publication as a narrative. In response to a query from Biddle, Clark noted that of Charbonneau's two Shoshone wives, the young woman from the Northern Shoshone was lighter skinned than the one from the "more Southern Indians". Sacagawea would accompany the expedition as one of the Corps' interpreters. There is no further evidence of Charbonneau's first wife in the journals.

Otter Woman did not accompany Charbonneau and Sacagawea on the Lewis and Clark expedition.

== See also ==
- List of kidnappings
- List of people who disappeared mysteriously (pre-1910)

== Sources ==
Dye, Eva Emery. The Conquest: The True Story of Lewis and Clark. Chicago: A.C. McClurg & Company, 1902.

Emmons, Della Gould, Sacajawea of the Shoshones, Binfords and Mort, Portland, 1943

Hebard, Grace R., Sacajawea: A Guide and Interpreter of the Lewis and Clark Expedition, with an Account of the Travels of Toussaint Charbonneau, and of Jean Baptiste, the Expedition Papoose, Arthur H. Clark Company, Glendale, 1932

Schultz, James Willard, Bird Woman (Sacajawea): The Guide of Lewis and Clark, Houghton, Mifflin, and Co., Boston, 1918

Thorne, Tanis C., The Many Hands of My Relations: French and Indians on the Lower Missouri, University of Missouri Press, Columbia & London, 1996
