= Cedar Township, Nance County, Nebraska =

Cedar Township
- Township
- Location in Nance County
- Coordinates: 41°27′16″N 098°00′05″W
- Country: United States
- State: Nebraska
- County: Nance

Area
  - Total: 41.15 sq mi (106.58 km^{2})
  - Land: 40.99 sq mi (106.17 km^{2})
  - Water: 0.16 sq mi (0.42 km^{2}) 0.39%
- Elevation: 1,811 ft (552 m)

Population (2020)
  - Total: 80
  - Density: 2.0/sq mi (0.75/km^{2})
- GNIS feature ID: 0837905

Cedar Township is one of twelve townships in Nance County, Nebraska, United States. The population was 80 at the 2020 census. A 2021 estimate placed the township's population at 80.

== See also ==
- County government in Nebraska
