= West Newman Township, Nance County, Nebraska =

West Newman Township
- Township
- Location in Nance County
- Coordinates: 41°18′05″N 098°02′45″W
- Country: United States
- State: Nebraska
- County: Nance

Area
  - Total: 28.47 sq mi (73.73 km^{2})
  - Land: 26.77 sq mi (69.34 km^{2})
  - Water: 1.69 sq mi (4.39 km^{2}) 5.95%
- Elevation: 1,680 ft (512 m)

Population (2020)
  - Total: 50
  - Density: 1.9/sq mi (0.72/km^{2})
- GNIS feature ID: 0838327

West Newman Township is one of twelve townships in Nance County, Nebraska, United States. The population was 50 at the 2020 census. A 2021 estimate placed the township's population at 50.

== See also ==
- County government in Nebraska
