= Moses Merrill Baptist Camp =

- U.S. National Register of Historic Places
- U.S. Historic district
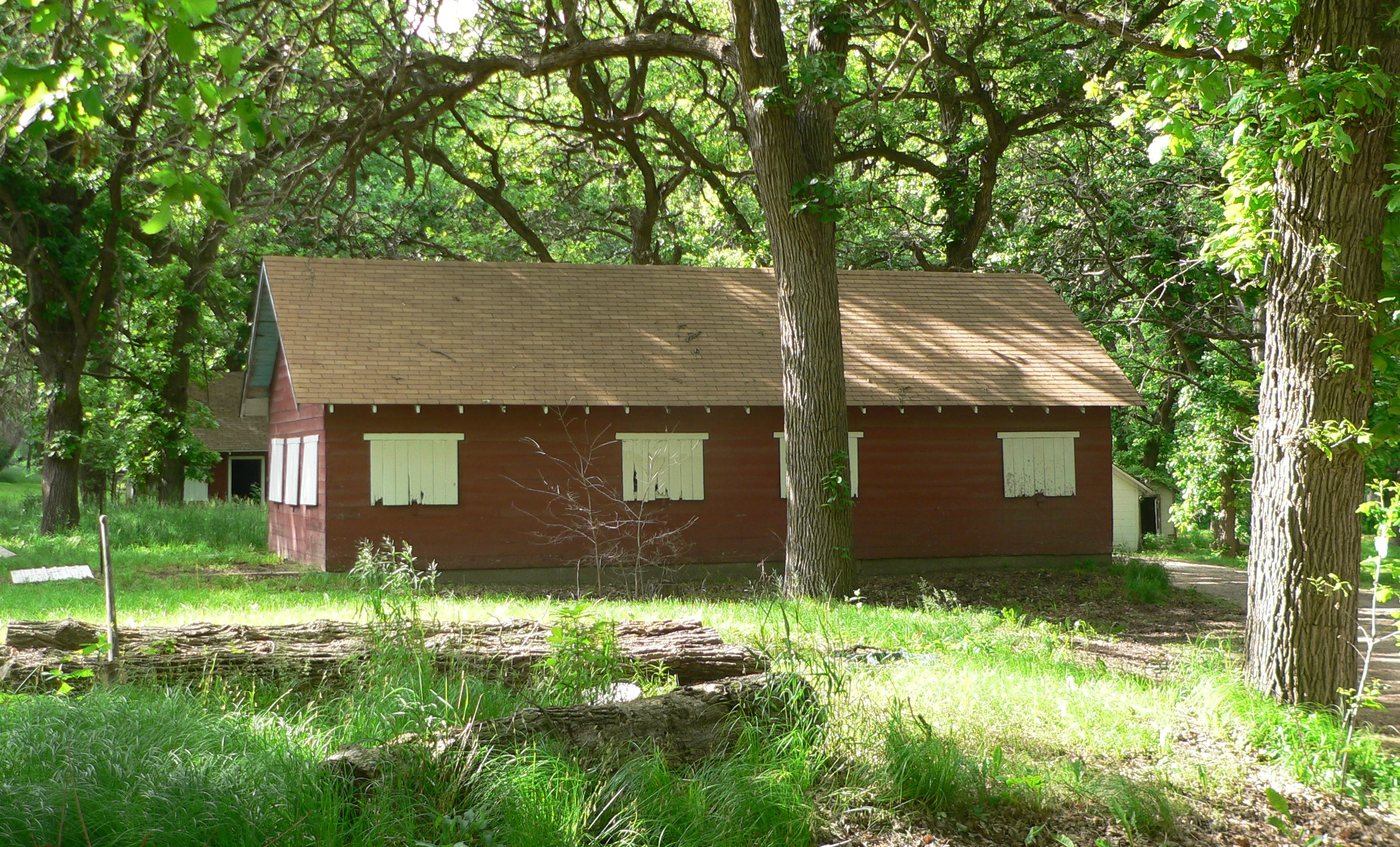

- Location within Nebraska Location within the United States
- Location: northwest of Fullerton
- Nearest city: Fullerton, Nebraska
- Coordinates: 41°22′16″N 97°59′06″W
- Area: 99 acres (40 ha)
- Built: 1942
- NRHP reference No.: 04000295
- Added to NRHP: April 14, 2004

The Moses Merrill Baptist Camp, near Fullerton, Nebraska, is a historic site dating to 1942. Also known as Broken Arrow Wilderness Area and Camp and denoted as NeHBS#NC00-002, it was listed on the National Register of Historic Places in 2004. The listing included 24 contributing buildings and one contributing object (main entrance gate) on 99 acres (40 ha). It was deemed significant for its association with religious history, being a summer camp site starting in 1942 for the Nebraska Baptist State Convention. In 2003, it was known as Broken Arrow Wilderness and Camp. It is located near the Cedar River.
