= Twin River Public Schools =

School district in Nebraska, United States

Location
- 816 Willard Ave P.O. Box 640 Genoa, Nebraska, 68640

District information
- Type: Public
- Established: 2001
- Superintendent: Jason Schappman

Students and staff
- Enrollment: Approx. 516
- District mascot: Bob the Titan
- Colors: Blue, silver, black and white

Other information
- Website: www.twinriverschools.org

Twin River Public Schools is a school district formed by the communities of Genoa, Monroe, and Silver Creek in Nebraska, United States. It is headquartered in Genoa. The district operates Twin River Elementary and Twin River High School.

It had about 516 students as of 2006.
