= East Newman Township, Nance County, Nebraska =

East Newman Township
- Township
- Location in Nance County
- Coordinates: 41°20′37″N 097°52′41″W
- Country: United States
- State: Nebraska
- County: Nance

Area
  - Total: 32.57 sq mi (84.35 km^{2})
  - Land: 31.92 sq mi (82.66 km^{2})
  - Water: 0.65 sq mi (1.69 km^{2}) 2%
- Elevation: 1,617 ft (493 m)

Population (2020)
  - Total: 84
  - Density: 2.6/sq mi (1.0/km^{2})
- GNIS feature ID: 0837973

East Newman Township is one of twelve townships in Nance County, Nebraska, United States. The population was 84 at the 2020 census. A 2021 estimate placed the township's population at 85.

== See also ==
- County government in Nebraska
