= South Branch Township, Nance County, Nebraska =

South Branch Township
- Township
- Location in Nance County
- Coordinates: 41°26′07″N 098°13′22″W
- Country: United States
- State: Nebraska
- County: Nance

Area
  - Total: 35.73 sq mi (92.55 km^{2})
  - Land: 35.71 sq mi (92.49 km^{2})
  - Water: 0.023 sq mi (0.06 km^{2}) 0.06%
- Elevation: 1,877 ft (572 m)

Population (2020)
  - Total: 34
  - Density: 0.95/sq mi (0.37/km^{2})
- GNIS feature ID: 0838258

South Branch Township is one of twelve townships in Nance County, Nebraska, United States. The population was 34 at the 2020 census. A 2021 estimate placed the township's population at 34.

== See also ==
- County government in Nebraska
