= Timber Creek Township, Nance County, Nebraska =

Timber Creek Township
- Township
- Location in Nance County
- Coordinates: 41°26′46″N 098°06′39″W
- Country: United States
- State: Nebraska
- County: Nance

Area
  - Total: 37.71 sq mi (97.68 km^{2})
  - Land: 37.52 sq mi (97.18 km^{2})
  - Water: 0.19 sq mi (0.49 km^{2}) 0.5%
- Elevation: 1,824 ft (556 m)

Population (2020)
  - Total: 186
  - Density: 4.96/sq mi (1.91/km^{2})
- ZIP code: 68623
- Area code: 308
- GNIS feature ID: 0838284

Timber Creek Township is one of twelve townships in Nance County, Nebraska, United States. The population was 186 at the 2020 census. A 2021 estimate placed the township's population at 186.

The Village of Belgrade lies within the Township.

== See also ==
- County government in Nebraska
