= Pawnee Reservation =

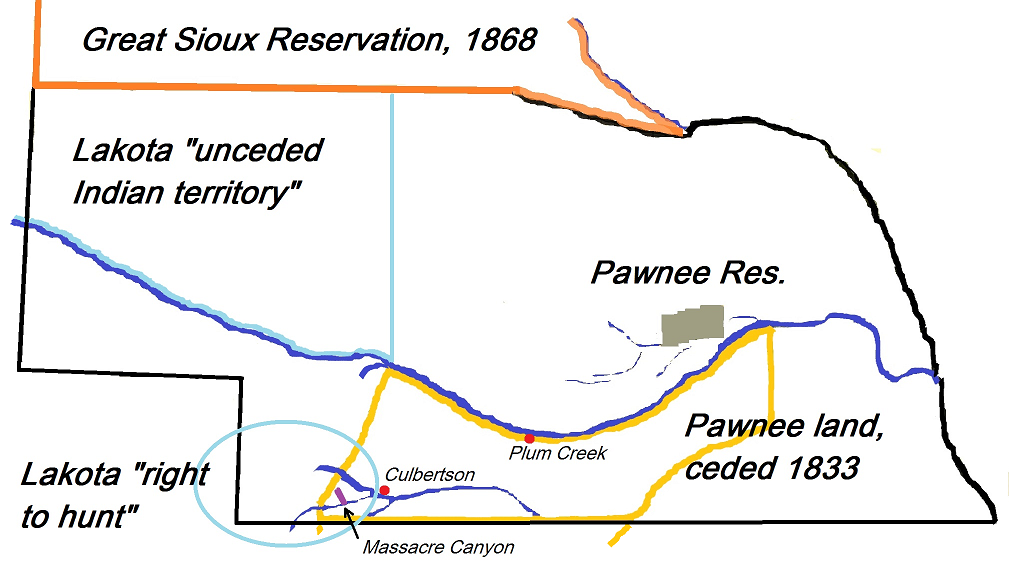
Nebraska map showing location of Pawnee Reservation and other Indian territories in 1873

The Pawnee Reservation was located on the Loup River in Platte and Nance counties in mid-central Nebraska . The Kawarakis Pawnees, the ancestors of the Chaui, Kitkehahki, and Pitahawirata Bands, settled in southeastern Nebraska in approximately 900.

Under three treaties with the United States in 1833, 1843, and 1857, the Pawnee ceded all of their lands to the United States government except a reservation 10 miles (16 km) wide by 30 miles (48 km) long along the Loup River in Nebraska. After the state of Nebraska was admitted into the Union, the state government extinguished the tribe's rights to their land. It soon sold the land and used the proceeds to defray expenses to obtain lands elsewhere for the Indians. In the mid-1870s the remainder of the reservation was sold, and in 1876 the tribe was relocated to its present-day location in central Oklahoma.

The Genoa Indian Industrial School was built in 1884 in the town of Genoa, which is located on the former Pawnee Reservation lands.

== See also ==
- Native American tribes in Nebraska
