= Evangelical United Brethren Church (Fullerton, Nebraska) =

- U.S. National Register of Historic Places
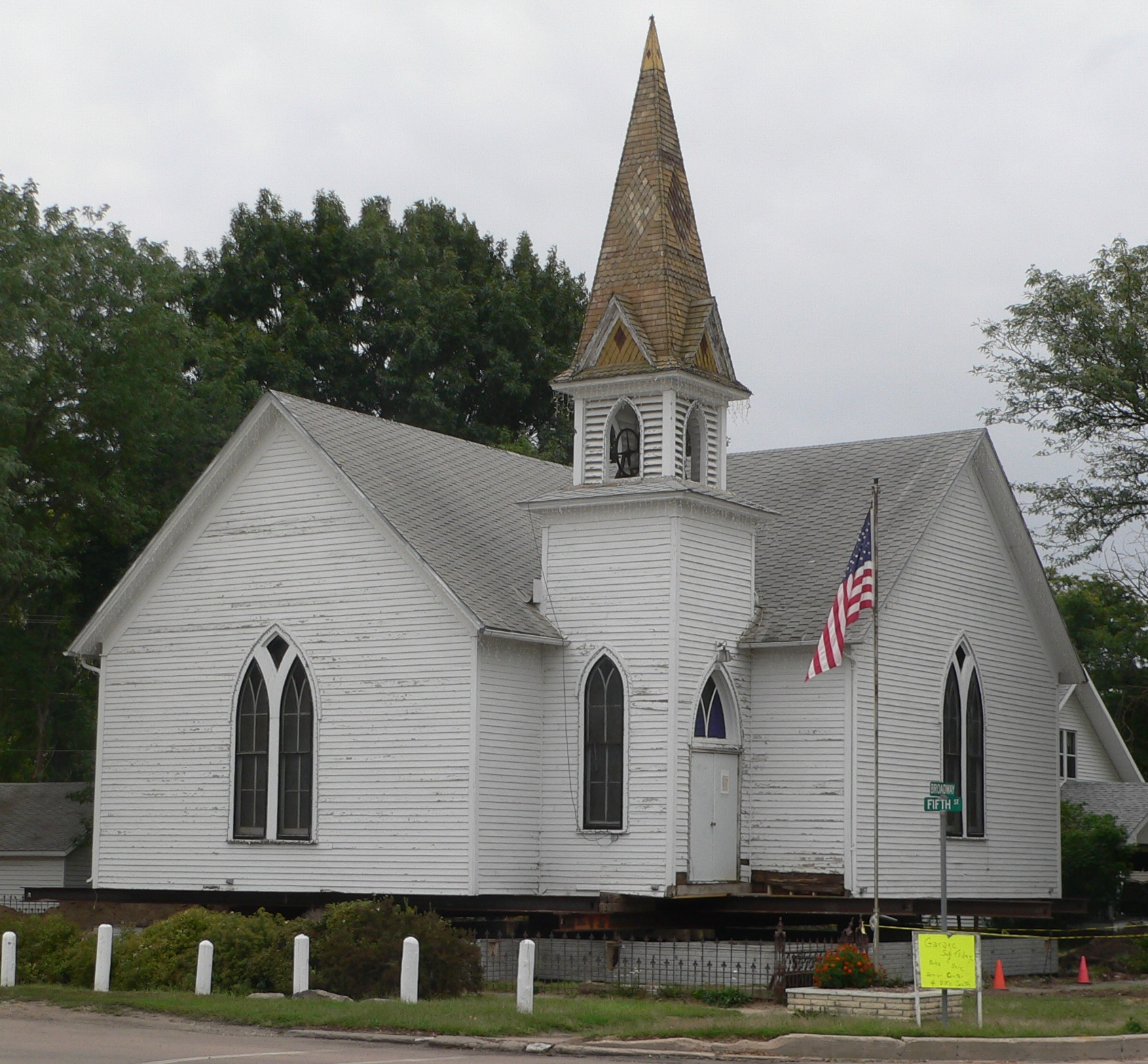

- Location within Nebraska
- Location: 501 Broadway St., Fullerton, Nebraska
- Coordinates: 41°21′39″N 97°58′06″W
- Area: less than one acre
- Built: 1900
- Architectural style: Late Gothic Revival
- NRHP reference No.: 13000678
- Added to NRHP: September 4, 2013

The Evangelical United Brethren Church in Fullerton, Nebraska, at 501 Broadway St., was built in 1900. It was listed on the National Register of Historic Places in 2013.

It is an L-plan church with its steeple in the L. It is Late Gothic Revival in style.

It has also been known as the United Evangelical Church, as "E" United Methodist Church, and as the Nance County Historical Society Museum.
