= Nance County, Nebraska =

County in Nebraska, United States

- County
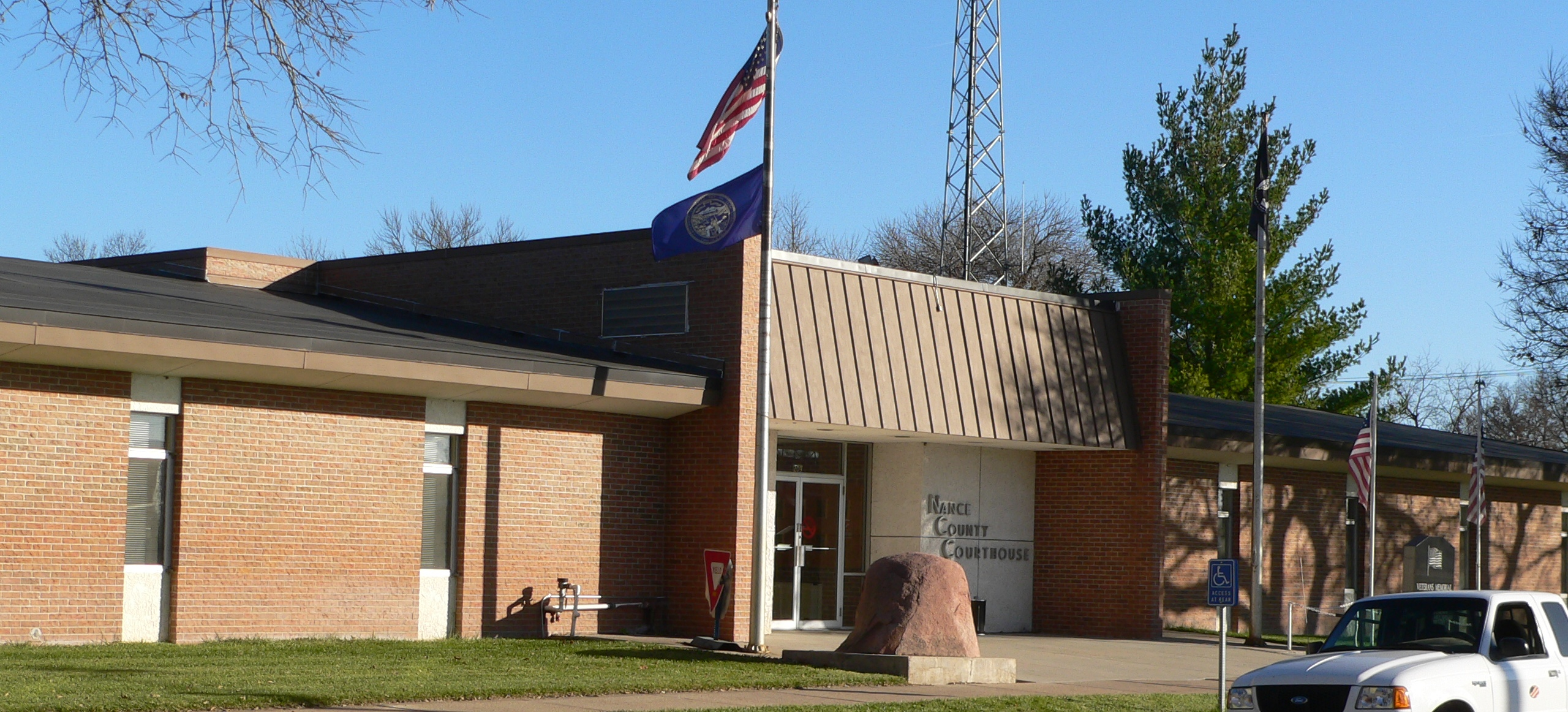
- Nance County Courthouse in Fullerton

- Location within the U.S. state of Nebraska
- Coordinates: 41°23′N 97°59′W
- Country: United States
- State: Nebraska
- Founded: 1879
- Named for: Albinus Nance
- Seat: Fullerton
- Largest city: Fullerton

Area
  - Total: 448 sq mi (1,160 km^{2})
  - Land: 442 sq mi (1,140 km^{2})
  - Water: 6.6 sq mi (17 km^{2}) 1.50%

Population (2020)
  - Total: 3,380
  - Estimate (2025): 3,290 ▼
  - Density: 7.65/sq mi (2.95/km^{2})
- Time zone: UTC−6 (Central)
  - Summer (DST): UTC−5 (CDT)
- Congressional district: 3rd
- Website: nancecountyne.gov

Nance County is a county in the U.S. state of Nebraska. As of the 2020 census, the population was 3,380. Its county seat is Fullerton.

In the Nebraska license plate system, Nance County is represented by the prefix 58 (it had the fifty-eighth-largest number of vehicles registered in the county when the license plate system was established in 1922).

== History ==
The land that comprises Nance County was originally part of the Pawnee Reservation, created in 1857 when the Pawnee Indians signed a treaty with the United States ceding its lands in exchange for the reservation. After Nebraska gained statehood in March 1867, the state government extinguished the tribe's rights to their land, sold the land and used the proceeds to defray expenses to obtain lands elsewhere for the Indians. In the mid-1870s the remainder of the reservation was sold, and in 1876 the tribe was relocated to its present-day location in central Oklahoma. The boundaries for Nance County were approved in 1879. It was named for Governor Albinus Nance.

Nearly all the land in Nance County was purchased by settlers or by investors for resale, instead of the homestead provisions common to most of Nebraska.

== Geography ==
The terrain of Nance County consists of rolling hills, sloping to the northeast. The Loup River flows east-northeastward through the central part of the county. The Cedar River flows southeastward to discharge into the Loup River near Fullerton. The county has a total area of 448 square miles (1,160 km^{2}), of which 442 square miles (1,140 km^{2}) is land and 6.6 square miles (17 km^{2}) (1.5%) is water.

=== Major highways ===
- Nebraska Highway 14
- Nebraska Highway 22
- Nebraska Highway 39
- Nebraska Highway 52

=== Adjacent counties ===
- Platte County (northeast)
- Merrick County (south)
- Greeley County (west)
- Boone County (north)

== Demographics ==
Historical population
Census	Pop.	Note	%±
1870	44		—
1880	1,212		2,654.5%
1890	5,773		376.3%
1900	8,222		42.4%
1910	8,926		8.6%
1920	8,712		−2.4%
1930	8,718		0.1%
1940	7,653		−12.2%
1950	6,512		−14.9%
1960	5,635		−13.5%
1970	5,142		−8.7%
1980	4,740		−7.8%
1990	4,275		−9.8%
2000	4,038		−5.5%
2010	3,735		−7.5%
2020	3,380		−9.5%
2025 (est.)	3,290	▼	−2.7%
US Decennial Census; 1790-1960 1900-1990; 1990-2000 2010

=== 2020 census ===
As of the 2020 census, the county had a population of 3,380. The median age was 44.4 years. 23.3% of residents were under the age of 18 and 22.6% of residents were 65 years of age or older. For every 100 females there were 103.2 males, and for every 100 females age 18 and over there were 103.9 males age 18 and over.

The racial makeup of the county was 95.4% White, 0.1% Black or African American, 0.4% American Indian and Alaska Native, 0.2% Asian, 0.0% Native Hawaiian and Pacific Islander, 0.3% from some other race, and 3.6% from two or more races. Hispanic or Latino residents of any race comprised 1.8% of the population.

0.0% of residents lived in urban areas, while 100.0% lived in rural areas.

There were 1,414 households in the county, of which 27.3% had children under the age of 18 living with them and 20.7% had a female householder with no spouse or partner present. About 30.9% of all households were made up of individuals and 17.1% had someone living alone who was 65 years of age or older.

There were 1,610 housing units, of which 12.2% were vacant. Among occupied housing units, 75.7% were owner-occupied and 24.3% were renter-occupied. The homeowner vacancy rate was 0.9% and the rental vacancy rate was 7.9%.

=== 2000 census ===
As of the 2000 United States census there were 4,038 people, 1,577 households, and 1,107 families in the county. The population density was 9 people per square mile (3.5 people/km^{2}). There were 1,787 housing units at an average density of 4 units per square mile (1.5/km^{2}). The racial makeup of the county was 98.39% White, 0.37% Native American, 0.05% Asian, 0.45% from other races, and 0.74% from two or more races. 1.14% of the population were Hispanic or Latino of any race.

There were 1,577 households, out of which 32.80% had children under the age of 18 living with them, 60.50% were married couples living together, 5.60% had a female householder with no husband present, and 29.80% were non-families. 27.60% of all households were made up of individuals, and 13.80% had someone living alone who was 65 years of age or older. The average household size was 2.49 and the average family size was 3.05.

The county population contained 27.90% under the age of 18, 6.80% from 18 to 24, 23.60% from 25 to 44, 22.00% from 45 to 64, and 19.70% who were 65 years of age or older. The median age was 40 years. For every 100 females there were 104.20 males. For every 100 females age 18 and over, there were 101.90 males.

The median income for a household in the county was $31,267, and the median income for a family was $38,717. Males had a median income of $25,349 versus $19,044 for females. The per capita income for the county was $16,886. About 10.20% of families and 13.10% of the population were below the poverty line, including 17.20% of those under age 18 and 9.30% of those age 65 or over.

== Communities ==
=== Cities ===
- Fullerton (county seat)
- Genoa

=== Village ===
- Belgrade

=== Unincorporated communities ===
- Krakow
- Merchiston

=== Townships ===
- Beaver
- Cedar
- Cottonwood
- Council Creek
- East Newman
- Fullerton
- Genoa
- Loup Ferry
- Prairie Creek
- South Branch
- Timber Creek
- West Newman

== Politics ==
Nance County voters are reliably Republican. In only one national election since 1936 has the county selected the Democratic Party candidate.

United States presidential election results for Nance County, Nebraska
Year	Republican		Democratic		Third party(ies)	
Year	No.	%	No.	%	No.	%
1900	1,091	54.77%	853	42.82%	48	2.41%
1904	1,198	66.30%	311	17.21%	298	16.49%
1908	1,082	52.55%	926	44.97%	51	2.48%
1912	630	32.69%	716	37.16%	581	30.15%
1916	930	43.56%	1,165	54.57%	40	1.87%
1920	1,877	69.49%	746	27.62%	78	2.89%
1924	1,574	47.42%	1,130	34.05%	615	18.53%
1928	2,299	63.28%	1,318	36.28%	16	0.44%
1932	1,156	31.58%	2,479	67.71%	26	0.71%
1936	1,770	46.20%	2,012	52.52%	49	1.28%
1940	1,963	57.77%	1,435	42.23%	0	0.00%
1944	1,697	60.39%	1,113	39.61%	0	0.00%
1948	1,339	56.79%	1,019	43.21%	0	0.00%
1952	2,112	73.77%	751	26.23%	0	0.00%
1956	1,779	69.55%	779	30.45%	0	0.00%
1960	1,699	62.67%	1,012	37.33%	0	0.00%
1964	1,155	46.61%	1,323	53.39%	0	0.00%
1968	1,316	60.79%	677	31.27%	172	7.94%
1972	1,413	68.79%	641	31.21%	0	0.00%
1976	1,121	53.05%	936	44.30%	56	2.65%
1980	1,442	67.29%	561	26.18%	140	6.53%
1984	1,393	72.14%	525	27.19%	13	0.67%
1988	1,185	59.55%	794	39.90%	11	0.55%
1992	851	42.83%	559	28.13%	577	29.04%
1996	892	51.74%	585	33.93%	247	14.33%
2000	1,105	66.37%	497	29.85%	63	3.78%
2004	1,237	71.46%	459	26.52%	35	2.02%
2008	1,116	65.38%	549	32.16%	42	2.46%
2012	1,106	68.23%	481	29.67%	34	2.10%
2016	1,261	77.79%	281	17.33%	79	4.87%
2020	1,437	78.44%	359	19.60%	36	1.97%
2024	1,462	79.28%	352	19.09%	30	1.63%

== See also ==
- National Register of Historic Places listings in Nance County, Nebraska
