= Merchiston, Nebraska =

Unincorporated community in Nebraska, U.S.

Coordinates: 41°23′25″N 97°53′05″W

Merchiston is an unincorporated community in Nance County, Nebraska, in the United States.

== History ==
Merchiston was a depot on the Union Pacific Railroad.
