= Fullerton Township, Nance County, Nebraska =

Fullerton Township
- Township
- Location in Nance County
- Coordinates: 41°22′05″N 098°00′36″W
- Country: United States
- State: Nebraska
- County: Nance

Area
  - Total: 28.95 sq mi (74.97 km^{2})
  - Land: 27.93 sq mi (72.33 km^{2})
  - Water: 1.02 sq mi (2.64 km^{2}) 3.52%
- Elevation: 1,726 ft (526 m)

Population (2020)
  - Total: 123
  - Density: 4.40/sq mi (1.70/km^{2})
- GNIS feature ID: 0838013

Fullerton Township is one of twelve townships in Nance County, Nebraska, United States. The population was 123 at the 2020 census. A 2021 estimate placed the township's population at 123.
