= Belgrade, Nebraska =

Village in Nebraska, United States

- Village
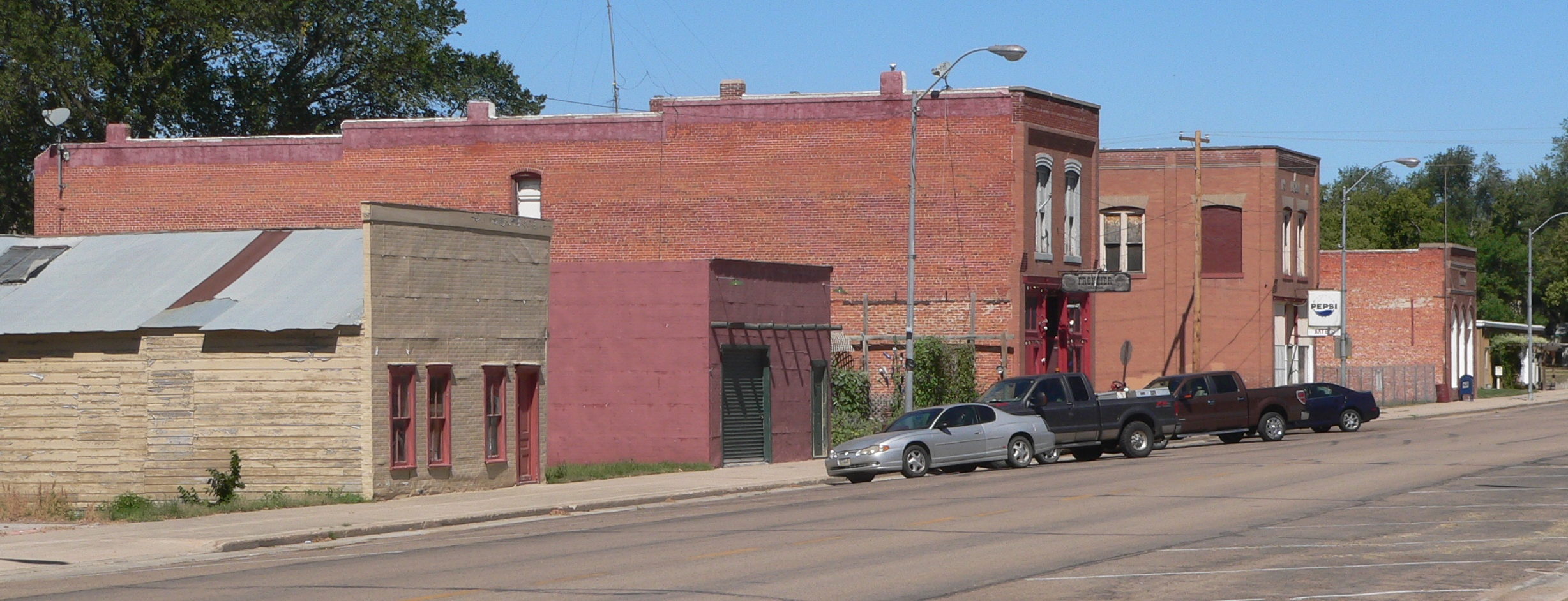
- Downtown Belgrade: C Street

- Location of Belgrade, Nebraska

- Location within Nebraska Location within the United States
- Coordinates: 41°28′15″N 98°04′04″W
- Country: United States
- State: Nebraska
- County: Nance
- Township: Timber Creek

Area
  - Total: 0.19 sq mi (0.50 km^{2})
  - Land: 0.19 sq mi (0.50 km^{2})
  - Water: 0 sq mi (0.00 km^{2})
- Elevation: 1,732 ft (528 m)

Population (2020)
  - Total: 103
  - Density: 537/sq mi (207.4/km^{2})
- Time zone: UTC-6 (Central (CST))
  - Summer (DST): UTC-5 (CDT)
- ZIP code: 68623
- Area code: 308
- FIPS code: 31-03810
- GNIS feature ID: 2398071

Belgrade is a village in Nance County, Nebraska, United States. As of the 2020 census, Belgrade had a population of 103.

== History ==
Belgrade was established in 1889 when the Union Pacific Railroad was extended to that point. The village was named after Belgrade, capital of Serbia.

== Geography ==
According to the United States Census Bureau, the village has a total area of 0.19 square miles (0.49 km^{2}), all of it land.

=== Climate ===
Climate data for Belgrade, Nebraska (coordinates:41.4636°N 98.0739°W, 1991-2020)
Month	Jan	Feb	Mar	Apr	May	Jun	Jul	Aug	Sep	Oct	Nov	Dec	Year
Average precipitation inches (mm)	0.62 (16)	0.66 (17)	1.45 (37)	2.79 (71)	4.35 (110)	4.28 (109)	2.87 (73)	3.55 (90)	2.37 (60)	2.09 (53)	1.26 (32)	0.81 (21)	27.1 (689)
Average snowfall inches (cm)	5.1 (13)	6.6 (17)	3.2 (8.1)	2.3 (5.8)	0.1 (0.25)	0.0 (0.0)	0.0 (0.0)	0.0 (0.0)	0.0 (0.0)	0.8 (2.0)	1.8 (4.6)	4.3 (11)	24.2 (61.75)
Average extreme snow depth inches (cm)	5 (13)	5 (13)	3 (7.6)	1 (2.5)	0 (0)	0 (0)	0 (0)	0 (0)	0 (0)	0 (0)	1 (2.5)	3 (7.6)	5 (13)
Average precipitation days (≥ 0.01 in)	4.4	5.1	6.8	9.0	10.8	10.3	7.9	8.2	7.2	7.6	4.0	5.2	86.5
Average snowy days (≥ 0.01 in)	3.6	4.2	1.7	1.1	0.1	0	0	0	0	0.6	1.3	3.8	16.4
Source: NOAA(snow depth 2003-2022)

== Demographics ==
Historical population
Census	Pop.	Note	%±
1910	400		—
1920	493		23.3%
1930	386		−21.7%
1940	406		5.2%
1950	284		−30.0%
1960	224		−21.1%
1970	210		−6.2%
1980	195		−7.1%
1990	157		−19.5%
2000	134		−14.6%
2010	126		−6.0%
2020	103		−18.3%
U.S. Decennial Census

=== 2010 census ===
As of the census of 2010, there were 126 people, 57 households, and 38 families residing in the village. The population density was 663.2 inhabitants per square mile (256.1/km^{2}). There were 73 housing units at an average density of 384.2 per square mile (148.3/km^{2}). The racial makeup of the village was 99.2% White and 0.8% from two or more races. Hispanic or Latino of any race were 0.8% of the population.

There were 57 households, of which 24.6% had children under the age of 18 living with them, 56.1% were married couples living together, 7.0% had a female householder with no husband present, 3.5% had a male householder with no wife present, and 33.3% were non-families. 28.1% of all households were made up of individuals, and 14% had someone living alone who was 65 years of age or older. The average household size was 2.21 and the average family size was 2.61.

The median age in the village was 48.2 years. 18.3% of residents were under the age of 18; 9.5% were between the ages of 18 and 24; 16.7% were from 25 to 44; 37.2% were from 45 to 64; and 18.3% were 65 years of age or older. The gender makeup of the village was 52.4% male and 47.6% female.

=== 2000 census ===
As of the census of 2000, there were 134 people, 63 households, and 36 families residing in the village. The population density was 730.3 inhabitants per square mile (282.0/km^{2}). There were 77 housing units at an average density of 419.6 per square mile (162.0/km^{2}). The racial makeup of the village was 100.00% White.

There were 63 households, out of which 23.8% had children under the age of 18 living with them, 47.6% were married couples living together, 4.8% had a female householder with no husband present, and 41.3% were non-families. 38.1% of all households were made up of individuals, and 15.9% had someone living alone who was 65 years of age or older. The average household size was 2.13 and the average family size was 2.73.

In the village, the population was spread out, with 23.9% under the age of 18, 6.7% from 18 to 24, 22.4% from 25 to 44, 28.4% from 45 to 64, and 18.7% who were 65 years of age or older. The median age was 42 years. For every 100 females, there were 94.2 males. For every 100 females age 18 and over, there were 92.5 males.

As of 2000 the median income for a household in the village was $28,750, and the median income for a family was $32,143. Males had a median income of $28,750 versus $21,875 for females. The per capita income for the village was $12,767. There were 12.5% of families and 15.8% of the population living below the poverty line, including no under eighteens and 33.3% of those over 64.

== Notable people ==
Belgrade was the birthplace of Oregon Republican politician Norma Paulus, who served two terms each as Oregon Secretary of State and as Superintendent of Public Instruction. Paulus lost the 1986 Oregon gubernatorial race to Democrat Neil Goldschmidt.

== See also ==
- List of municipalities in Nebraska
