= Evangelical United Brethren Church (Dayton, Oregon) =

Church in Dayton, Oregon, U.S.

- U.S. National Register of Historic Places
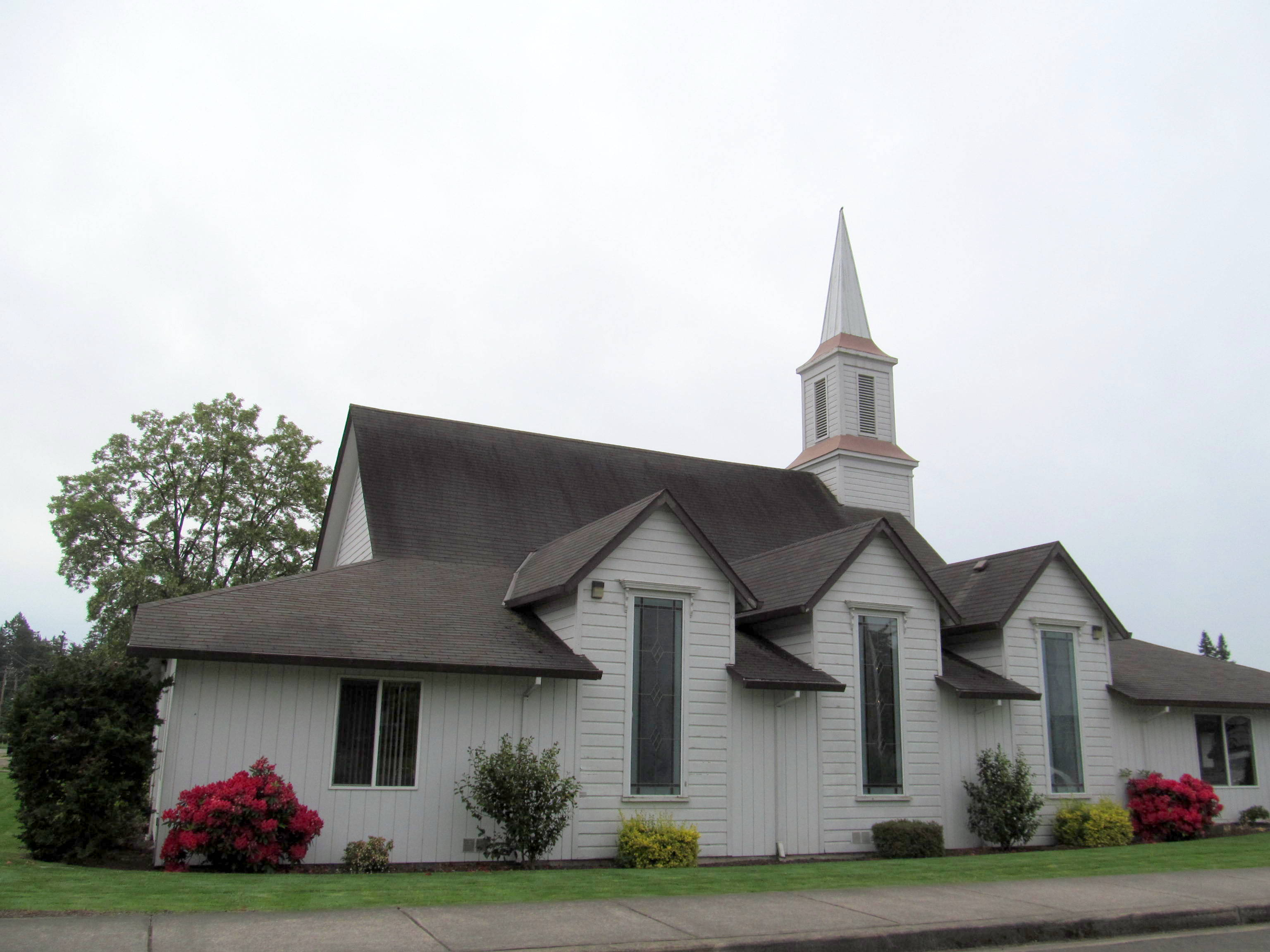
- The Evangelical United Brethren Church in 2012

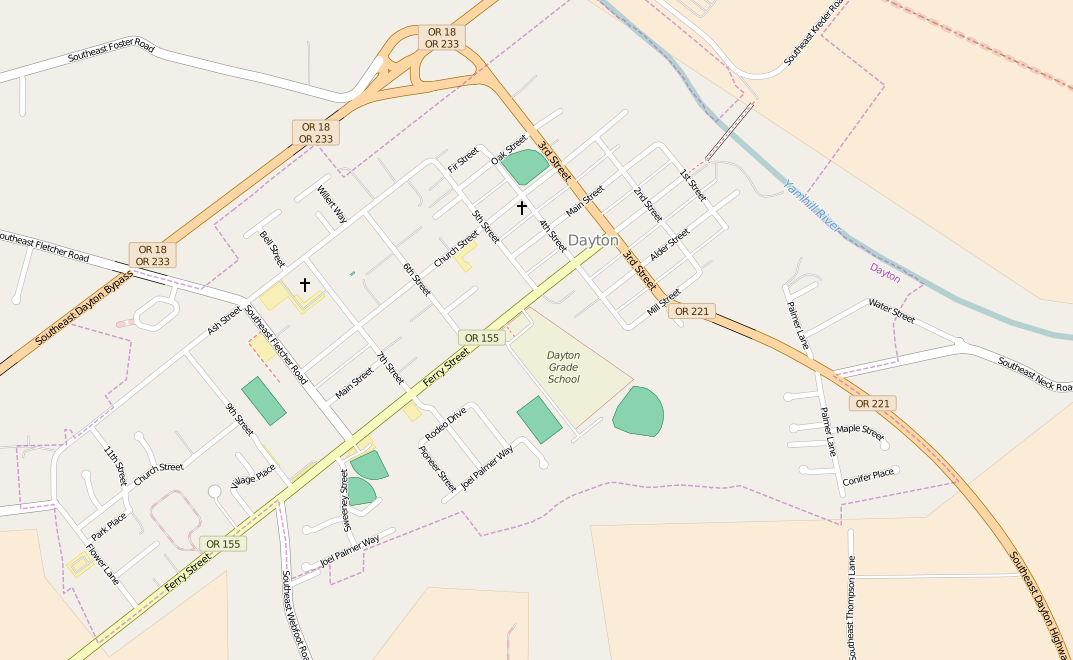
- Location within Dayton OR
- Location: 302 5th Street; Dayton, Oregon
- Coordinates: 45°13′15″N 123°04′46″W
- Area: less than one acre
- Built: 1883
- MPS: Dayton MRA
- NRHP reference No.: 87000346
- Added to NRHP: August 3, 1987

Evangelical United Brethren Church (also known as Christian Church) is a historic church at 302 Fifth Street in Dayton, Oregon.

It was built in 1883 and added to the National Register of Historic Places in 1987.
