= Genoa, Nebraska =

City in Nance County, Nebraska, United States

- City
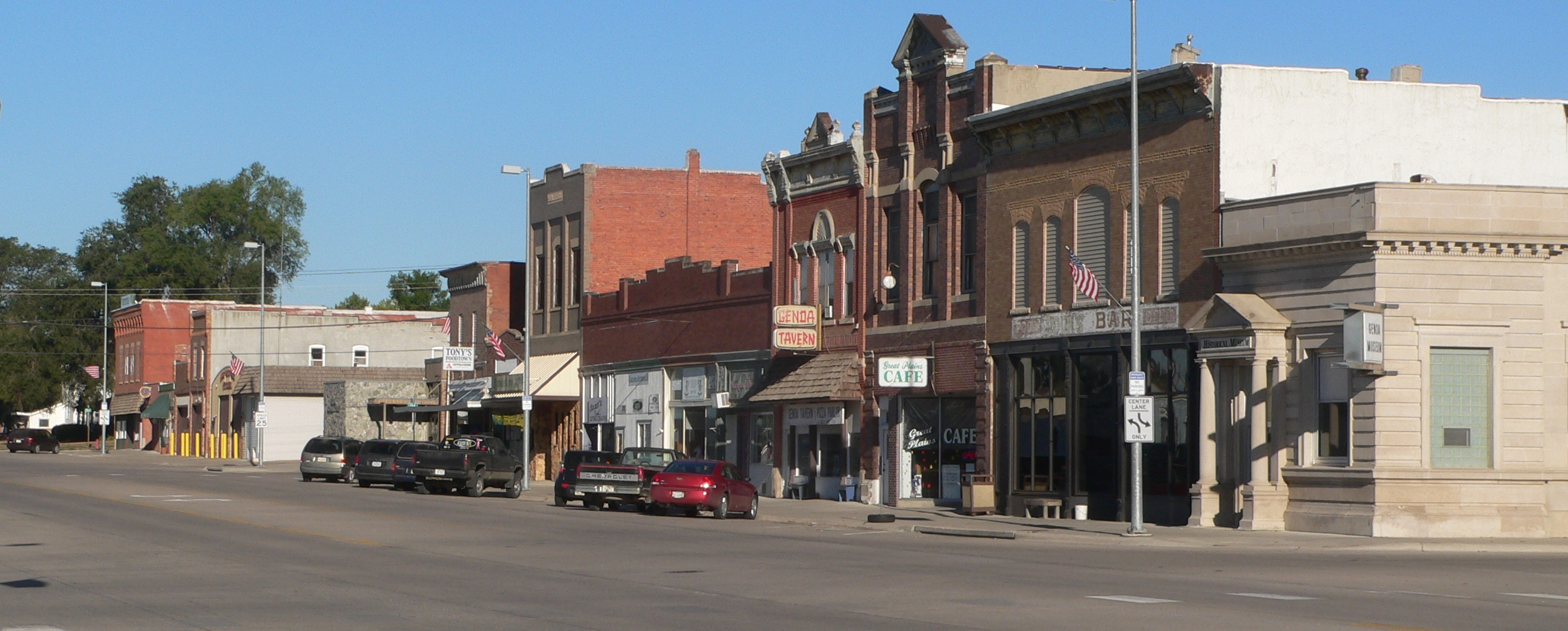
- Downtown Genoa: Willard Street

- Location of Genoa, Nebraska

- Location within Nebraska Location within the United States
- Coordinates: 41°26′46″N 97°43′56″W
- Country: United States
- State: Nebraska
- County: Nance
- Township: Genoa

Area
  - Total: 0.80 sq mi (2.07 km^{2})
  - Land: 0.79 sq mi (2.05 km^{2})
  - Water: 0.0077 sq mi (0.02 km^{2})
- Elevation: 1,572 ft (479 m)

Population (2020)
  - Total: 894
  - Density: 1,127.5/sq mi (435.34/km^{2})
- Time zone: UTC-6 (Central (CST))
  - Summer (DST): UTC-5 (CDT)
- ZIP code: 68640
- Area code: 402
- FIPS code: 31-18475
- GNIS feature ID: 838022
- Website: www.ci.genoa.ne.us

Genoa (pron. je NO uh) is a city in Nance County, Nebraska, United States. The population was 894 at the 2020 census. The city was founded by Mormons in 1857. In the fall of 1859, the Mormon Colony was forced to abandon Genoa when the town and surrounding area were incorporated into the newly created Pawnee Reservation. The Pawnee Indian Agency utilized the structures vacated by the Mormons.

== Demographics ==
Historical population
Census	Pop.	Note	%±
1880	187		—
1890	793		324.1%
1900	913		15.1%
1910	1,376		50.7%
1920	1,069		−22.3%
1930	1,089		1.9%
1940	1,231		13.0%
1950	1,026		−16.7%
1960	1,009		−1.7%
1970	1,174		16.4%
1980	1,115		−5.0%
1990	1,082		−3.0%
2000	981		−9.3%
2010	1,003		2.2%
2020	894		−10.9%
U.S. Decennial Census

=== 2020 census ===
As of the census of 2020, there were 894 people, 416 housing units, and 337 households in the city. The racial makeup of the city was 94.1% White, <0.1% African American, <0.1% Native American, <0.1% Asian, <0.1% from other races, and 5% from two or more races. Hispanic or Latino of any race were 2.7% of the population. The median age in the city was 39.0 years.

=== 2010 census ===
As of the census of 2010, there were 1,003 people, 408 households, and 234 families living in the city. The population density was 1,269.6 inhabitants per square mile (490.2/km^{2}). There were 446 housing units at an average density of 564.6 per square mile (218.0/km^{2}). The racial makeup of the city was 96.6% White, 0.1% African American, 0.4% Native American, 0.2% Asian, 1.0% from other races, and 1.7% from two or more races. Hispanic or Latino of any race were 3.4% of the population.

There were 408 households, of which 27.7% had children under the age of 18 living with them, 46.3% were married couples living together, 7.1% had a female householder with no husband present, 3.9% had a male householder with no wife present, and 42.6% were non-families. 38.5% of all households were made up of individuals, and 15.5% had someone living alone who was 65 years of age or older. The average household size was 2.29 and the average family size was 3.03.

The median age in the city was 40.7 years. 23.4% of residents were under the age of 18; 8.3% were between the ages of 18 and 24; 22.3% were from 25 to 44; 29% were from 45 to 64; and 17.2% were 65 years of age or older. The gender makeup of the city was 49.8% male and 50.2% female.

=== 2000 census ===
As of the census of 2000, there were 981 people, 411 households, and 247 families living in the city. The population density was 1,237.9 inhabitants per square mile (478.0/km^{2}). There were 442 housing units at an average density of 557.8 per square mile (215.4/km^{2}). The racial makeup of the city was 98.37% White, 0.31% Native American, 0.10% Asian, 0.31% from other races, and 0.92% from two or more races. Hispanic or Latino of any race were 0.71% of the population.

There were 411 households, out of which 31.1% had children under the age of 18 living with them, 49.6% were married couples living together, 6.3% had a female householder with no husband present, and 39.7% were non-families. 36.3% of all households were made up of individuals, and 20.0% had someone living alone who was 65 years of age or older. The average household size was 2.29 and the average family size was 3.00.

In the city, the population was spread out, with 26.5% under the age of 18, 8.4% from 18 to 24, 23.4% from 25 to 44, 20.4% from 45 to 64, and 21.3% who were 65 years of age or older. The median age was 40 years. For every 100 females, there were 101.4 males. For every 100 females age 18 and over, there were 100.3 males.

As of 2000 the median income for a household in the city was $31,023, and the median income for a family was $38,988. Males had a median income of $26,250 versus $18,929 for females. The per capita income for the city was $16,980. About 6.6% of families and 10.8% of the population were below the poverty line, including 16.1% of those under age 18 and 8.2% of those age 65 or over.

== Geography ==
According to the United States Census Bureau, the city has a total area of 0.80 square miles (2.07 km^{2}), of which, 0.79 square miles (2.05 km^{2}) is land and 0.01 square miles (0.03 km^{2}) is water.

=== Climate ===
Climate data for Genoa 2 W, Nebraska (1991–2020 normals, extremes 1893–present)
Month	Jan	Feb	Mar	Apr	May	Jun	Jul	Aug	Sep	Oct	Nov	Dec	Year
Record high °F (°C)	74 (23)	80 (27)	91 (33)	98 (37)	105 (41)	108 (42)	116 (47)	110 (43)	106 (41)	97 (36)	85 (29)	79 (26)	116 (47)
Mean maximum °F (°C)	58.0 (14.4)	63.9 (17.7)	76.2 (24.6)	86.2 (30.1)	92.3 (33.5)	95.6 (35.3)	96.4 (35.8)	95.0 (35.0)	93.0 (33.9)	86.6 (30.3)	73.7 (23.2)	59.2 (15.1)	98.5 (36.9)
Mean daily maximum °F (°C)	34.2 (1.2)	38.7 (3.7)	51.5 (10.8)	62.8 (17.1)	72.7 (22.6)	82.0 (27.8)	85.4 (29.7)	83.0 (28.3)	77.6 (25.3)	64.7 (18.2)	49.5 (9.7)	36.9 (2.7)	61.6 (16.4)
Daily mean °F (°C)	23.8 (−4.6)	27.7 (−2.4)	39.3 (4.1)	50.1 (10.1)	60.9 (16.1)	70.8 (21.6)	74.5 (23.6)	72.2 (22.3)	65.0 (18.3)	51.8 (11.0)	37.9 (3.3)	26.9 (−2.8)	50.1 (10.1)
Mean daily minimum °F (°C)	13.4 (−10.3)	16.8 (−8.4)	27.1 (−2.7)	37.3 (2.9)	49.0 (9.4)	59.7 (15.4)	63.6 (17.6)	61.4 (16.3)	52.3 (11.3)	39.0 (3.9)	26.2 (−3.2)	16.8 (−8.4)	38.6 (3.7)
Mean minimum °F (°C)	−11.1 (−23.9)	−7.0 (−21.7)	4.7 (−15.2)	19.6 (−6.9)	32.5 (0.3)	46.0 (7.8)	51.4 (10.8)	48.6 (9.2)	34.8 (1.6)	19.8 (−6.8)	6.3 (−14.3)	−5.8 (−21.0)	−14.9 (−26.1)
Record low °F (°C)	−31 (−35)	−34 (−37)	−18 (−28)	−1 (−18)	20 (−7)	35 (2)	40 (4)	37 (3)	13 (−11)	2 (−17)	−14 (−26)	−28 (−33)	−34 (−37)
Average precipitation inches (mm)	0.67 (17)	0.79 (20)	1.60 (41)	2.98 (76)	4.37 (111)	4.42 (112)	2.96 (75)	3.03 (77)	2.52 (64)	2.17 (55)	1.23 (31)	0.95 (24)	27.69 (703)
Average snowfall inches (cm)	6.4 (16)	6.9 (18)	4.7 (12)	1.8 (4.6)	0.1 (0.25)	0.0 (0.0)	0.0 (0.0)	0.0 (0.0)	0.0 (0.0)	1.1 (2.8)	2.9 (7.4)	5.0 (13)	28.9 (73)
Average precipitation days (≥ 0.01 in)	5.7	5.5	7.0	8.3	11.2	9.7	8.4	8.3	7.0	7.0	5.0	6.0	89.1
Average snowy days (≥ 0.1 in)	4.7	4.2	2.7	1.2	0.1	0.0	0.0	0.0	0.0	0.6	2.2	4.3	20.0
Source: NOAA

== Education ==
Genoa is home to Twin River Public Schools, which was formed in 2001 by consolidating the school districts of three communities: Genoa, Monroe, and Silver Creek. The district's elementary school, junior high and high school are all located in Genoa.

Genoa was also home to the Genoa Indian Industrial School, an American Indian boarding school.

== Notable people ==
- Glen "Frosty" Little
- Samuel F. Tappan

== See also ==
- List of municipalities in Nebraska
- Pawnee people
