= Fullerton, Nebraska =

City in and county seat of Nance County, Nebraska, United States

- City
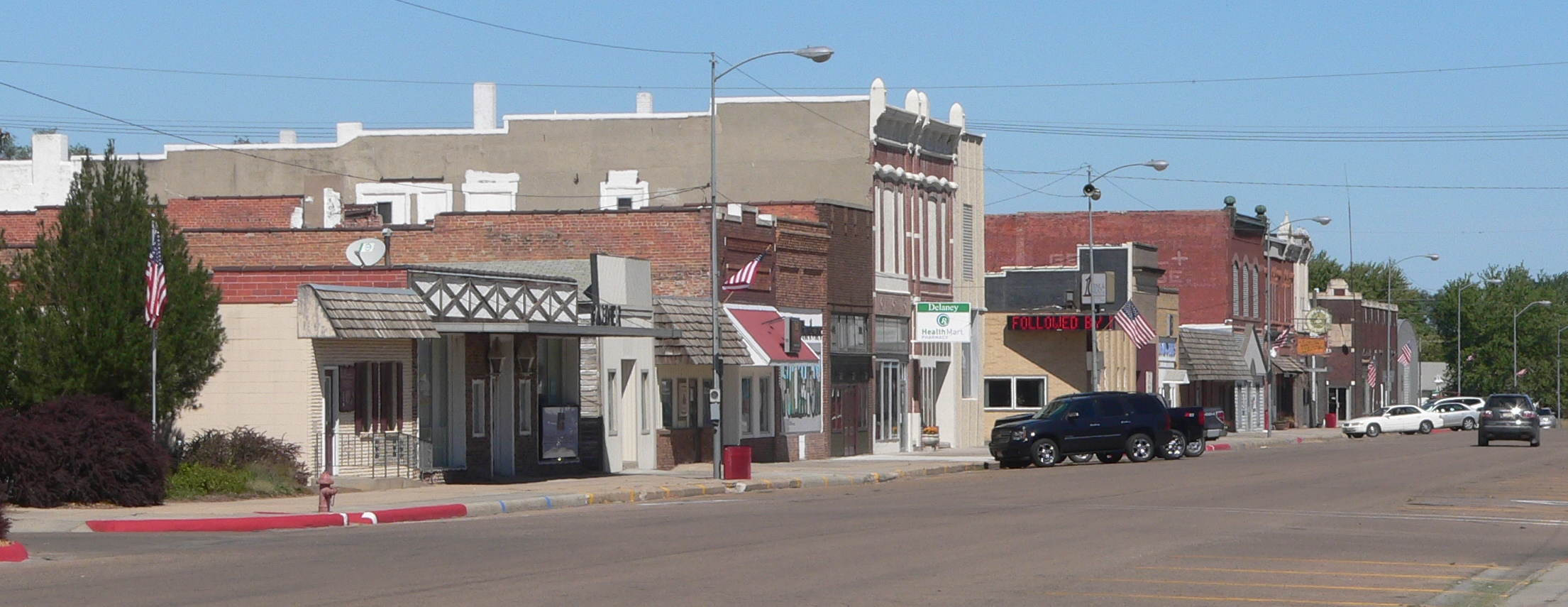
- Downtown Fullerton

- Location of Fullerton, Nebraska

- Location within Nebraska Location within the United States
- Coordinates: 41°21′55″N 97°58′21″W
- Country: United States
- State: Nebraska
- County: Nance
- Township: Fullerton

Area
  - Total: 1.37 sq mi (3.54 km^{2})
  - Land: 1.34 sq mi (3.47 km^{2})
  - Water: 0.023 sq mi (0.06 km^{2})
- Elevation: 1,654 ft (504 m)

Population (2020)
  - Total: 1,244
  - Density: 930/sq mi (358/km^{2})
- Time zone: UTC-6 (Central (CST))
  - Summer (DST): UTC-5 (CDT)
- ZIP code: 68638
- Area code: 308
- FIPS code: 31-17810
- GNIS feature ID: 838012
- Website: fullertonne.gov

Fullerton is a city in and the county seat of Nance County, Nebraska, United States. As of the 2020 census, Fullerton had a population of 1,244.

== History ==
A location by Fullerton called "Buffalo Leap" was thought to be used by aboriginals for driving buffalo to their deaths as a hunting method. It is also known as "Lover's Leap". Currently it is a part of the Broken Arrow Wilderness Camp located just north of Fullerton.

In 1856, the Fullerton area became part of a Pawnee reservation and was excluded from settlement under the 1862 Homestead Act. Randall Fuller bought large tracts of land when the reservation was auctioned in 1871 and donated some for public use. The town was platted in about 1878, and named after Fuller.

== Geography ==
According to the United States Census Bureau, the city has a total area of 1.26 square miles (3.26 km^{2}), all of it land.

The community is located at the junction of Routes 14 and 22.

== Demographics ==
Historical population
| Census | Pop. | Note | %± |
|---|---|---|---|
| 1900 | 1,464 | | — |
| 1910 | 1,638 | | 11.9% |
| 1920 | 1,595 | | −2.6% |
| 1930 | 1,680 | | 5.3% |
| 1940 | 1,707 | | 1.6% |
| 1950 | 1,520 | | −11.0% |
| 1960 | 1,475 | | −3.0% |
| 1970 | 1,444 | | −2.1% |
| 1980 | 1,506 | | 4.3% |
| 1990 | 1,452 | | −3.6% |
| 2000 | 1,378 | | −5.1% |
| 2010 | 1,307 | | −5.2% |
| 2020 | 1,244 | | −4.8% |
U.S. Decennial Census

=== 2010 census ===
As of the census of 2010, there were 1,307 people, 564 households, and 346 families living in the city. The population density was 1,037.3 inhabitants per square mile (400.5/km^{2}). There were 656 housing units at an average density of 520.6 per square mile (201.0/km^{2}). The racial makeup of the city was 98.3% White, 0.5% African American, 0.5% Native American, 0.5% from other races, and 0.3% from two or more races. Hispanic or Latino of any race were 1.0% of the population.

There were 564 households, of which 24.1% had children under the age of 18 living with them, 48.8% were married couples living together, 7.8% had a female householder with no husband present, 4.8% had a male householder with no wife present, and 38.7% were non-families. 36.0% of all households were made up of individuals, and 19.3% had someone living alone who was 65 years of age or older. The average household size was 2.19 and the average family size was 2.81.

The median age in the city was 47.5 years. 21.3% of residents were under the age of 18; 5.9% were between the ages of 18 and 24; 19.8% were from 25 to 44; 28.9% were from 45 to 64; and 24.3% were 65 years of age or older. The gender makeup of the city was 48.2% male and 51.8% female.

=== 2000 census ===
As of the census of 2000, there were 1,378 people, 551 households, and 375 families living in the city. The population density was 1,110.0 inhabitants per square mile (428.6/km^{2}). There were 636 housing units at an average density of 512.3 per square mile (197.8/km^{2}). The racial makeup of the city was 96.95% White, 0.80% Native American, 0.07% Asian, 1.09% from other races, and 1.09% from two or more races. Hispanic or Latino of any race were 2.47% of the population.

There were 551 households, out of which 29.6% had children under the age of 18 living with them, 55.4% were married couples living together, 9.1% had a female householder with no husband present, and 31.9% were non-families. 30.3% of all households were made up of individuals, and 16.9% had someone living alone who was 65 years of age or older. The average household size was 2.37 and the average family size was 2.94.

In the city, the population was spread out, with 25.9% under the age of 18, 6.7% from 18 to 24, 20.6% from 25 to 44, 22.2% from 45 to 64, and 24.5% who were 65 years of age or older. The median age was 42 years. For every 100 females, there were 96.0 males. For every 100 females age 18 and over, there were 88.7 males.

As of 2000 the median income for a household in the city was $31,055, and the median income for a family was $39,087. Males had a median income of $26,528 versus $19,063 for females. The per capita income for the city was $17,593. About 8.5% of families and 12.0% of the population were below the poverty line, including 17.2% of those under age 18 and 10.3% of those age 65 or over.

== Notable people ==
- Annette Dubas, Nebraska State Senator

== See also ==
- List of municipalities in Nebraska
