= Genoa Indian Industrial School =

- U.S. Indian Industrial School
- U.S. National Register of Historic Places
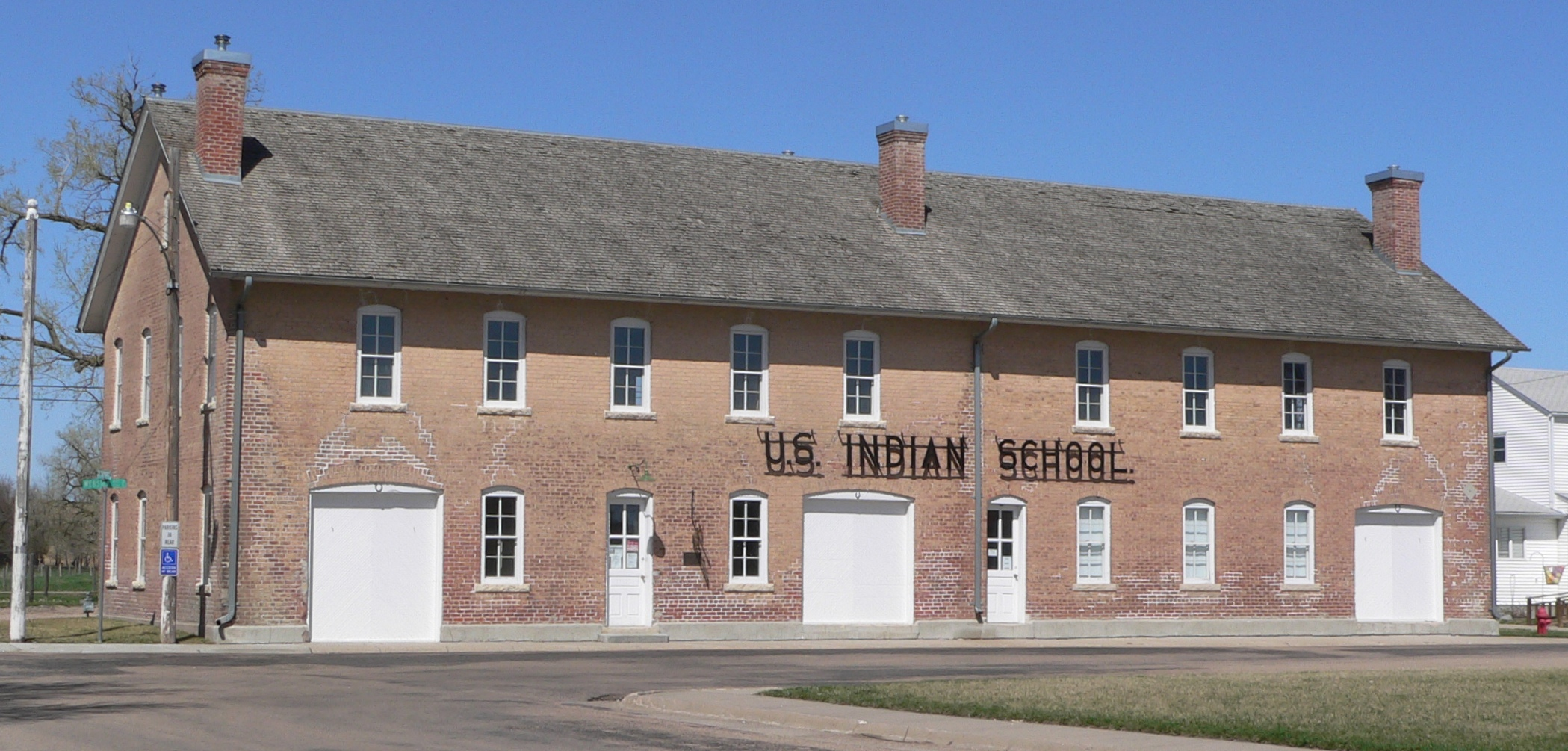
- Shop building, now operated as a museum

- Location within Nebraska Location within the United States
- Nearest city: Genoa, Nebraska
- Coordinates: 41°26′58″N 97°43′27″W
- Area: 470 acres (190 ha)
- Built: 1884
- NRHP reference No.: 78001706
- Added to NRHP: May 22, 1978

The Indian Industrial School at Genoa, Nebraska, United States was the fourth non-reservation boarding institution established by the Office of Indian Affairs. The facility was completed in 1884 and operated until 1934. Now restored, it is owned and operated by a foundation as the Genoa U.S. Indian School Museum. The building is listed on the National Register of Historic Places.

== About ==
The facility opened on February 20, 1884, and, like other such schools, its mission was to educate and teach Christianity and European-American culture to Native American children for assimilation. The village of Genoa, Nebraska was selected because the Federal Government already owned the former Pawnee Reservation property there; however, existing buildings at the site were unsuitable and in poor repair. The Pawnee had been removed to Indian Territory in 1879.

Like many buildings designed for Indian school campuses, the main building was a simple three-story structure with a hipped roof and a small triangular pediment above the center entrance. The pairs of tall windows and the strong horizontal lines across the front created a balanced composition. The building extended at length from its front facade. This was a popular design during the late 1880s.

The school expanded, eventually enrolling Native American children from ten states and over 20 tribes. In time the school grew from the original 74 students to an enrollment of 599. It encompassed more than 30 buildings on 640 acres. The U.S. government closed the school in 1934, during the Great Depression.

At least 86 children died at the school, although the true death toll is likely higher. The causes of many of these deaths are currently unknown, but disease was a factor in at least some deaths, particularly in the school's early years. In 1892, for example, the school experienced a severe measles outbreak. Ten children died and 105 were sick. Other causes of death may have included tuberculosis, influenza, and pneumonia. An accidental shooting, a drowning, and a freight car accident also occurred, though some may not have been accidents but suicides.

== Genoa U.S. Indian School Museum ==
The Genoa US Indian School Foundation purchased the Manual Training building of the school from the town of Genoa, restored it and now operates the facility as the Genoa U.S. Indian School Museum.

== Gallery ==
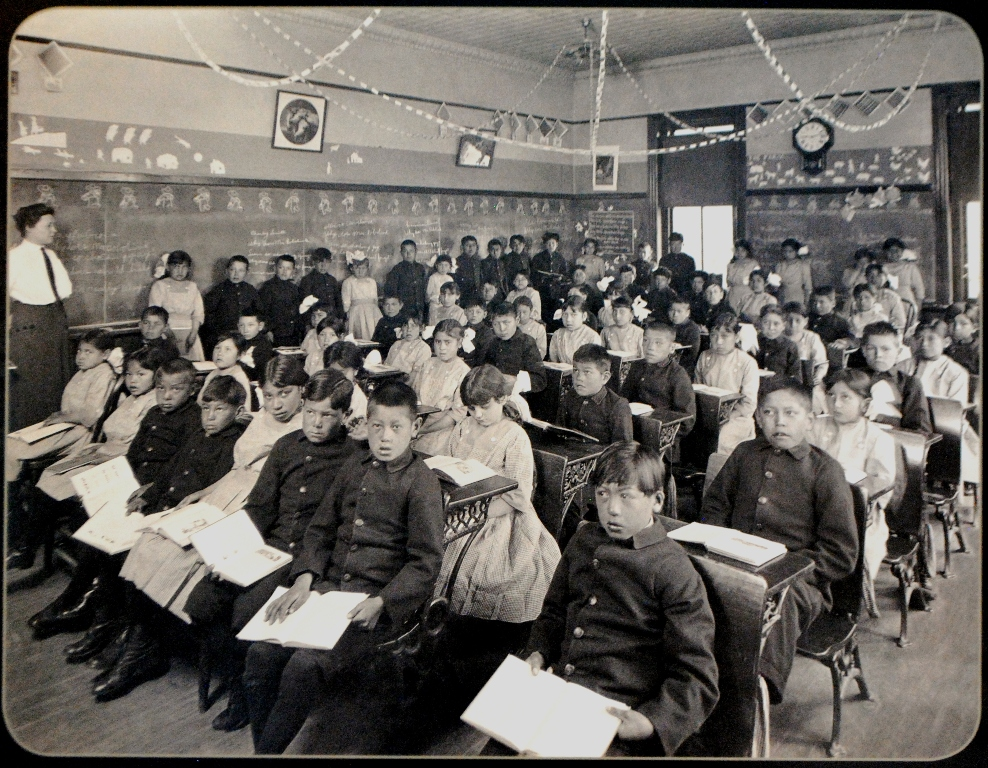
Students at the Genoa Indian School appeared anxious in a photo taken in 1910. Young children were forcibly taken away from family and tribes to ostensibly educate them and make them more able to succeed in the dominant Anglo-Saxon culture.

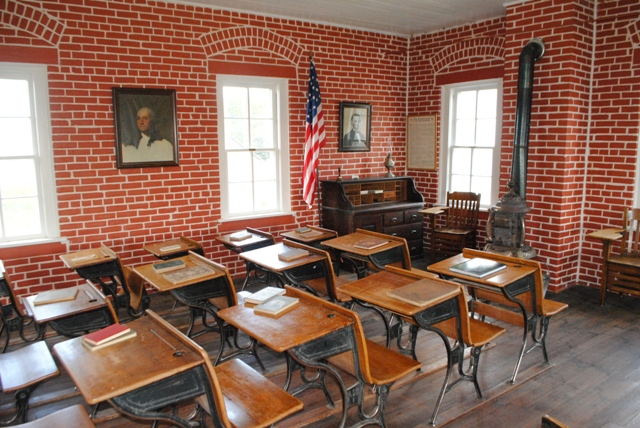
The two floors of exhibits at the Genoa School Museum include a classroom set up to look much as it did when students studied there.

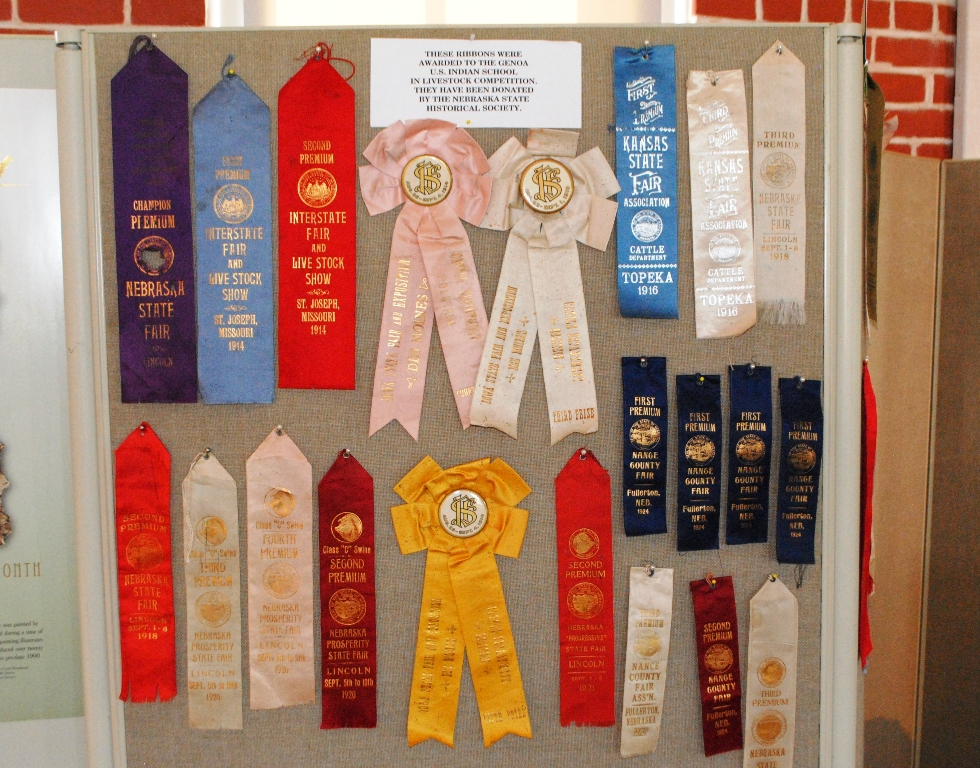
The Genoa Indian School Museum displays awards won by its students from 1914 to 1924. Indian student farmers proved very adept at raising livestock and won numerous awards at country fairs.

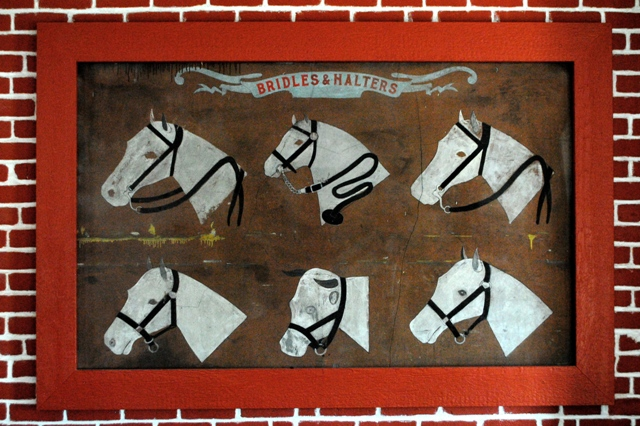
Student artists at the Genoa Indian School painted signs that showed the different kinds of tack for horses and carriages that other students made for sale.

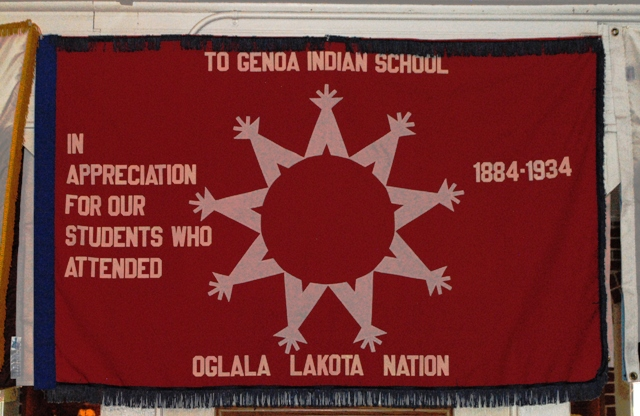
Museum staff asked the tribes whose children had attended the School if they wanted to send banners to commemorate the children's attendance. To their surprise, over 30 tribes sent banners that are now displayed at the school.

== See also ==
- Native American tribes in Nebraska
