= Genoa Township, Nance County, Nebraska =

Genoa Township
- Township
- Location in Nance County
- Coordinates: 41°26′26″N 097°46′52″W
- Country: United States
- State: Nebraska
- County: Nance

Area
  - Total: 32.98 sq mi (85.41 km^{2})
  - Land: 32.23 sq mi (83.47 km^{2})
  - Water: 0.75 sq mi (1.93 km^{2}) 2.26%
- Elevation: 1,600 ft (500 m)

Population (2020)
  - Total: 233
  - Density: 7.23/sq mi (2.79/km^{2})
- GNIS feature ID: 0838023

Genoa Township is one of twelve townships in Nance County, Nebraska, United States. The population was 233 at the 2020 census. A 2021 estimate placed the township's population at 233.

== See also ==
- County government in Nebraska
