= Ponca Tribe of Nebraska =

Total population
- 5,334 (2023, census)

Regions with significant populations
- United States
- Nebraska: 1,923
- Iowa: 394
- South Dakota: 366
- Colorado: 342

Languages
- English, Ponca

Religion
- traditional tribal religion, Christianity, Native American Church

Related ethnic groups
- other Ponca people, Omaha, other Dhegihan peoples

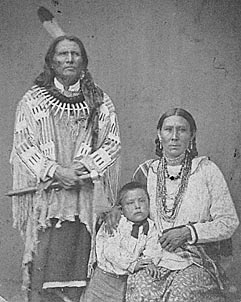
Standing Bear, Susette Primeau, and their son

The Ponca Tribe of Nebraska is one of two federally recognized tribes of the Ponca people. The other is the Ponca Tribe of Indians of Oklahoma. As of 2023, the Ponca Tribe of Nebraska’s total population is 5,334 citizens, of which 1,923 reside in Nebraska.

== Reservation ==
From the original Ponca Reservation, the tribe has repurchased a trust landbase of 819 acres (331 ha). Since the passage of the Ponca Restoration Act, the tribe has the legal right to conduct business in Iowa.

The tribe has used the land to restore a bison herd to the area.

== Government ==
The Ponca Tribe of Nebraska is headquartered in Niobrara, Nebraska. The tribe is governed by a democratically elected council. Candace Schmidt is currently serving as tribal chairperson.

== History ==
Ponca people are thought to have migrated to the Great Plains from the Ohio River valley. In the mid-16th century, Ponca people migrated with the Kansa, Omaha, and Osage north, up the Mississippi. They separated from the Omaha in the mid-17th century but reunited with them near the Niobrara River of Nebraska in 1793. Introduced European diseases had killed 90% of the Ponca people by 1804, when the Lewis and Clark Expedition arrived in their lands.

The Ponca signed their first treaty with the United States in 1817, ceding two million acres of their lands. In 1858, their reservation had been reduced to 100,000 acres (40,000 ha). Poncas were removed to Indian Territory; 25% of the tribe died from disease and starvation in a single year. Chief Standing Bear led a group on a 500-mile walking trek (800 km) back to their homelands in Nebraska to bury their dead. The subsequent trial, Standing Bear v. Crook established the writ of habeas corpus for the first time for Native Americans, also allowed the Poncas to have lands restored to them in Nebraska. Niobrara Island was included in the original reservation.

In the 1930s, an archeological survey was begun on the Ponca/Niobrara Reservation south of the Niobrara River and Lynch, Nebraska. In an effort to identify and save prehistoric artifacts before they were destroyed during agricultural development, the University of Nebraska–Lincoln and the Smithsonian Institution undertook a joint project. The team excavated a prehistoric Ponca village; the ten laborers on the project were paid by the Works Progress Administration of the Franklin D. Roosevelt administration during the Great Depression. The project was to survey, identify and protect ancient resources. The Ponca village included large circular homes up to sixty feet in diameter; their residences were located for almost two miles (3 km) along the south bank of the Niobrara River.

In the 1950s, the United States government unilaterally terminated recognition of the Ponca Tribe of Nebraska. Since 1990, the tribe reacquired 413 acres (167 ha) of their lost lands. The US government finally re-recognized the tribe in 1990.

In 2018 farmers Helen and Art Tanderup gifted and deeded 1.6 acres (0.65 ha) of their land near Neligh, Nebraska, which had been in their family for 137 years, back to the tribe in the first ceremony of its kind; the Fifth Annual planting of sacred Ponca corn also took place. The land lies in the path of the historic Trail of Tears as well as the Keystone XL Pipeline.

== Notable tribal members ==
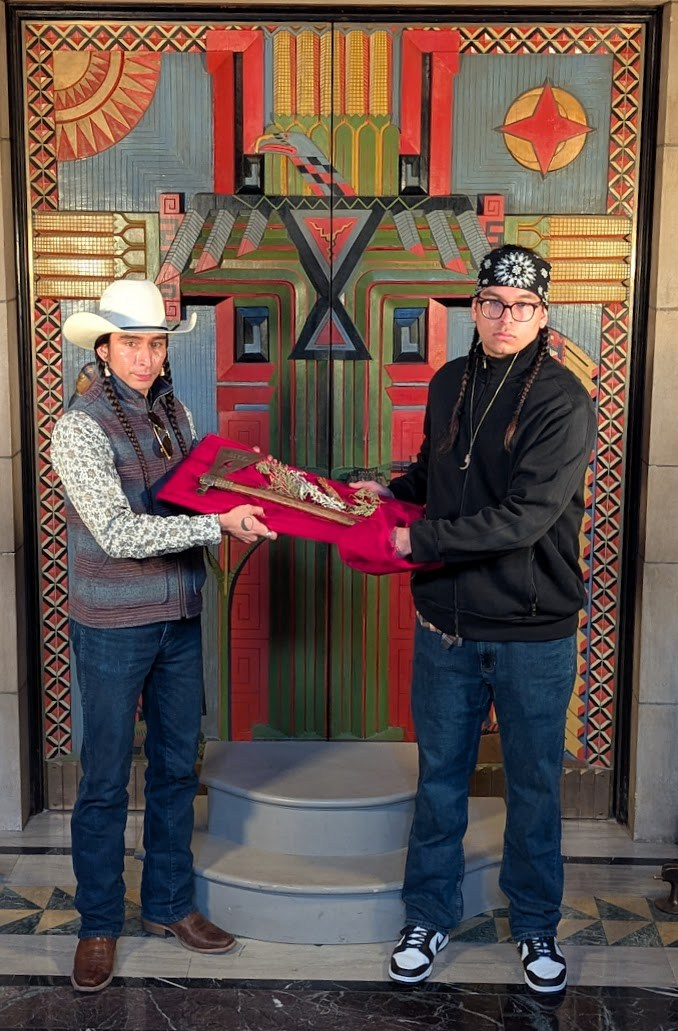
Two Ponca men display Chief Standing Bear's pipe tomahawk at the Nebraska State Capitol

- Standing Bear, chief.
- Verdell Primeaux, Native American Church singer and songwriter.
