= Native Americans in film =

Depiction of Native Americans

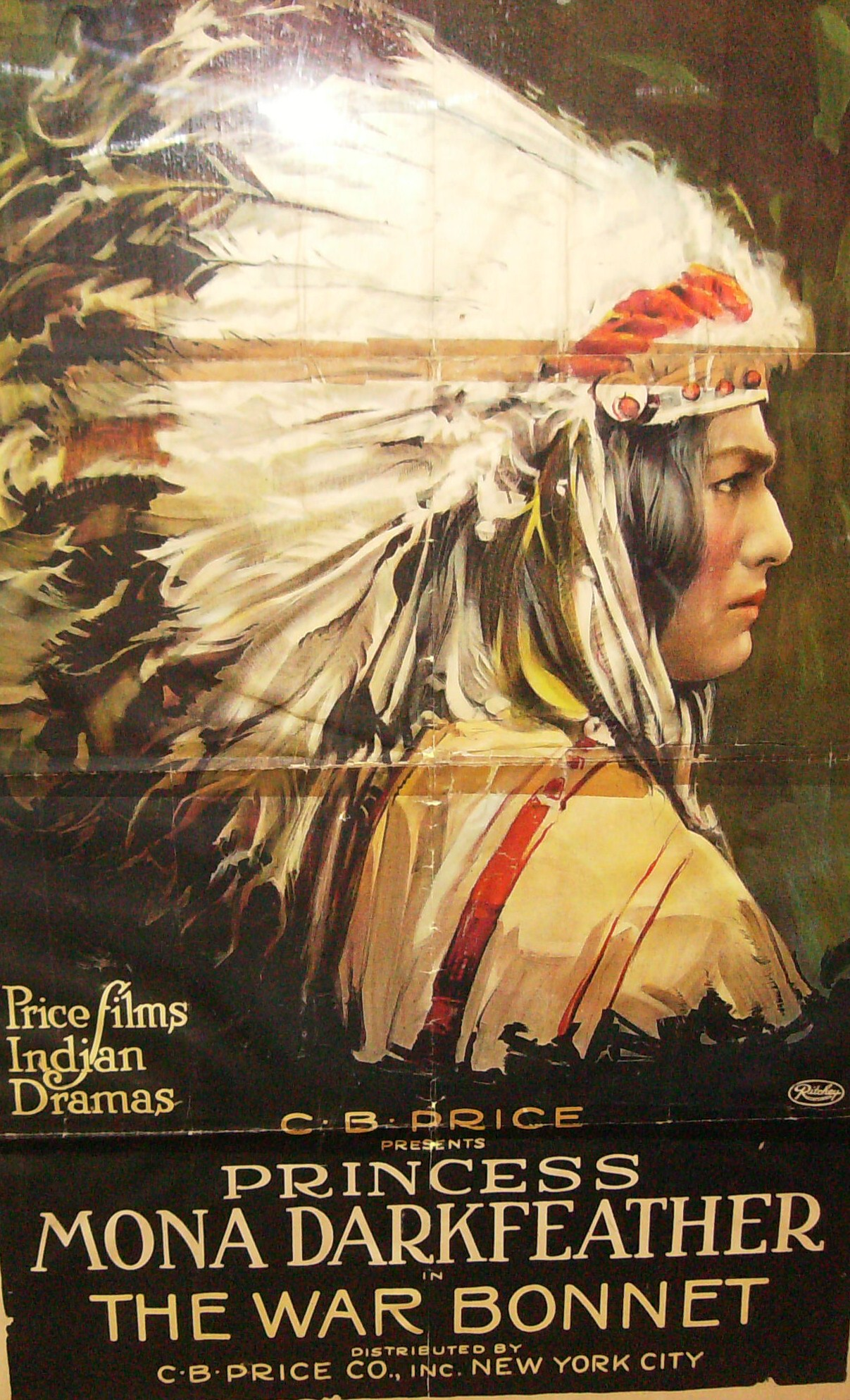
The War Bonnet (1914) starring Mona Darkfeather, who was not Native American.

The portrayal of Native Americans in films concerns Native Americans' roles in cinema, particularly their depiction in Hollywood productions, as well as television and videos. While Native Americans have directed and produced films since the 1910s, a resurgence in the 1990s led by Native American filmmakers began a movement of producing independent films that work to represent the depth and complexity of Indigenous peoples as people and provide a realistic account of their culture. In the turn of the century, the rise of Native American and Indigenous filmmakers has allowed for greater representation in Hollywood and in mainstream media. Contemporary Native filmmakers have employed the use of visual sovereignty, defined by scholar Michelle H. Raheja (Seneca descent) as "a way of reimagining Native-centered articulations of self-representation and autonomy that engage the powerful ideologies of mass media," to take back the right to tell their own stories.

== Prominent Native American Filmmakers ==
=== Native American Actors and Actresses ===
- Lily Gladstone (1986 –)
- Zahn McClarnon (1966 –)
- Will Sampson (1933 – 1987)
- John Trudell (1946 – 2014)
- Irene Bedard (1967 –)
- Graham Greene (1952 – 2025)
- Dallas Goldtooth (1983 –)
- Jana Schmieding (1981 –)
- Will Rogers (1879 – 1935)

=== Directors, Producers, and Filmmakers ===
- Chris Eyre (1968 –)
  - director and producer
- Sterlin Harjo (1979 –)
  - director, producer, and screenwriter
- Wesley Studi (1947 –)
  - actor and producer
- Billy Luther
  - writer and director
- Sydney Freeland (1980 –)
  - director
- James Young Deer (1876 – April 6, 1946)
  - Considered first Native American director
  - Additionally an early film actor, director, writer, and producer

== History ==
The portrayal of Native Americans in cinema has, since the beginning of the motion picture industry, employed harmful stereotypes, especially the archetypes of Native Americans as violent barbarians or noble savages. During the 1930s, negative images dominated Westerns. In 1950, the watershed film Broken Arrow appeared, which many credit as the first postwar Western to depict Native Americans sympathetically.

=== Origins ===
Circa the 1860s, stories involving heroic American Indian figures were proliferated in dime novels.

From the 1870s to the 1910s, Wild West shows such as Buffalo Bill's Wild West Show popularized conflict between cowboys and Indians. These stage performances toured America and Europe, presenting romanticized fiction about the American frontier which some audiences misunderstood as history. In 1912, Buffalo Bill Cody produced a three-minute silent film titled The Life of Buffalo Bill, starring himself.

In his 1917 novel, Cody identified himself as an "Indian fighter," and his wild west shows led to widespread misrepresentation of Native Americans, despite involvement with Native American actors. Some Native actors chose to portray the shows' chiefs as belligerent, while others portrayed their roles with humble dignity - possibly creating the bloodthirsty savage & noble Indian dichotomy, or "double stereotype."

=== Silent film era ===
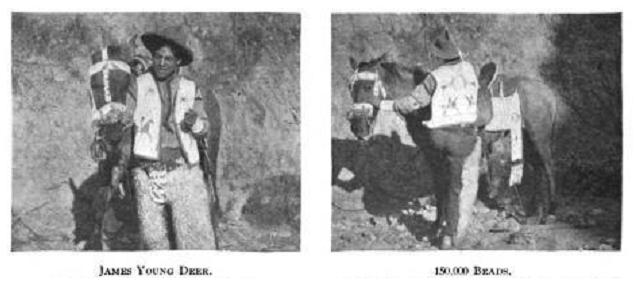
James Young Deer was a Nanticoke Native American film director involved in over 150 Native-themed silent films.

In 1908, D.W. Griffith released The Red Man and the Child. The film featured a sympathetic depiction of Native American characters; however, critics describe their portrayal as a "helpless Indian race...forced to recede before the advancing white." Similar depictions included The Indian Runner's Romance (1909) and The Red Man's View (1909).

Native Americans were the center of these pictures, but they were only able to play extras in the backgrounds. Films such as The Covered Wagon (1923) were produced near and on reservations with Native Americans not given the lead roles. They would be forced to play unrealistic stereotypes of themselves while being treated as just a part of the setting. The stereotypes ranged from "princess" to "squaw" for woman and men were portrayed as savages to their white counterparts.

The "Princess" stereotype showed Native women being devoted to her white lover which is seen as negative to her tribe. The Indian Squaw's Sacrifice (1910) shows a Native woman nursing a wounded white man, marrying him, and then finding that he loves another woman which leads to her demise. Whereas the "Squaw" stereotype is known for being shameful about her sexuality and seen as hostile to her white counterparts.

By 1910, one-fifth of American films were Westerns.

The stories of these Silent Westerns were affected by the Indian boarding-school policy because of the tales of children being separated from their families. The narratives inspired by the impacts of the U.S. Indian Policy showcased interracial romance, adoption, and mistaken identity. The cross-racial couples within these silent westerns had stories of assimilating an "Other" into their world through teachings.

Circa 1910, Nanticoke film director James Young Deer was hired by Pathé to produce accurate Native American silent films with positive portrayals. Deer, an actor, writer, and director, was involved in the production of over 150 movies, an example being White Fawn's Devotion: A Play Acted by a Tribe of Red Indians in America.

In 1912, D. W. Griffith released A Pueblo Legend and The Massacre, which both failed to show Native Americans in a positive light. The Massacre romanticized Custer's roles in the Indian Wars, with recurring scenes of white mother struggling to protect her infant, while a Native American mother is killed and collapses offscreen. Griffith would later become infamous for his creation of The Birth of a Nation, a racist propaganda film that portrayed the KKK as heroic.

Griffith would create several documentaries centering on Native Americans from a sympathetic view. Griffith's films were different from westerns because they focused on "nostalgia for lost paradises" rather than the battles. These short films provoke sympathy for the Native Americans who were often seen in a negative light.

In 1914, Theodore Wharton directed The Indian War Refought: The Wars for Civilization in America which romanticized multiple battles including the 1890 Wounded Knee Massacre, wherein U.S. Army soldiers killed over 250 Lakota Indians, including men, women, and children, and buried them in a mass grave. This film depicted the massacre as a battle; it was directed by the War Department and approved by the United States government. It can be therefore considered a propaganda film, with the goal of rationalizing the government's actions. Despite its historical inaccuracies, a 1914 Moving Picture World advertisement claims,

This most realistic film of the age...has been APPROVED BY THE UNITED STATES GOVERNMENT and made under the DIRECTION OF THE WAR DEPARTMENT...Historically Correct and all scenes TAKEN ON THE EXACT LOCATION of the original battles.

In 1914, ethnologist Edward S. Curtis directed silent film In the Land of the Head Hunters, a fictionalized documentary about the lives and culture of Kwakwakaʼwakw people of the Queen Charlotte Strait in Canada. Although Curtis wrote and directed the film, all of its actors were entirely Kwakwakaʼwakw.

The 1930 silent film The Silent Enemy is an example of a film that focuses on Native American characters prior to colonization. The film dramatizes a famine experienced by the Ojibwe during the post-classical era and incorporates folklore, spiritual visions, and religious elements. The film begins with a sound-synchronized speech in English by Ojibwe chief and activist Chauncey Yellow Robe who stars in the film.

Early films featuring Native characters varied in their depictions. Some of these characters were often shown wearing leather clothing with feathers in their hair or with elaborate feather headdresses. Authors have argued that Native communities were often depicted as cruel societies that sought out constant warfare and vengeance against white characters. But while some individual Native characters appeared as drunkards, cruel, or unintelligent, others, like those in The Red Man and the Child (1908), A Mohawk's Way (1910), and The Red Girl and the Child (1910), were friends or allies to white settlers. These depictions however were often one-dimensional and perpetuated the idea that the only good Native is one that helps white settlers. A few successful Indian/white marriages did occur in film during these early years, such as A Cry from the Wilderness (1909), A Leap for Life (1910) and The Indian Land Grab (1911). Other depictions were generalized stereotypes and used largely for aesthetic purposes and many tribes were represented. Feather headdresses were culturally and historically correct for approximately two dozen Plains tribes, and those of the American southwest were often wearing traditional clothing. This was done to create a more recognizable character for white audiences to view as "indian". Many directors did not care about accuracy when it came to language either, with Native actors being asked to speak in their native language no matter what tribe they are supposed to be from in the film. These discrepancies worked to create the Hollywood Indian stereotype prevalent within the Western genre.

Beverly R. Singer argues that "Despite the fact that a diversity of indigenous peoples had a legal and historical significance in the formation of every new country founded in the Western Hemisphere, in the United States and Canada the term 'Indians' became a hegemonic designation implying that they were all the same in regards to culture, behavior, language, and social organization". Other scholars argued these films in fact showed a wide range of depictions of Native people from noble to sympathetic.

== Later films ==
The revisionist Western, also known as a Modern Western or an anti-Western, is a subgenre of Western films that began circa 1960. This subgenre is characterized by a darker and more cynical tone that was generally not present in earlier Western films.

=== Revisionist Westerns featuring Native characters ===
- Two Rode Together (1961)
- The Deadly Companions (1961)
- Bitter Wind (1963)
- Navajo Joe (1966)
- Hombre (1967)
- Tell Them Willie Boy Is Here (1969)
- Soldier Blue (1970)
- Little Big Man (1970)
- Chato's Land (1972)
- Jeremiah Johnson (1972)
- Buffalo Bill and the Indians (1976)
- The Missouri Breaks (1976)
- Dances with Wolves (1990)
- Thunderheart (1992)
- Dead Man (1995)
- The Missing (2003)
- The Only Good Indian (2009)

In the 1970s, Revisionist Westerns like Little Big Man and Soldier Blue often portrayed Native Americans as victims and white people as the frontier's aggressive intruders. While the studio comedy Little Big Man still centers on a white protagonist, Dustin Hoffman, the Native Americans are depicted sympathetically while members of the United States Cavalry are depicted as villains. The Cheyenne in the film are living harmoniously and peacefully at the start of the film, and it's the encroachment of the violent white men who are the harmful, disruptive influence on their culture and landscape. The film is also noted for including a Two-Spirit character as well as showing Lt. Colonel George Armstrong Custer as a lunatic – a fool and a fop – whom the white protagonist betrays for the sake of his adopted Indian family.

The 1980s saw the emergence of independent films with contemporary Native content such as Powwow Highway, a road movie and buddy film where one protagonist, an angry young activist, namechecks the American Indian Movement while the other visits sacred sites to greet the dawn. Both are on their way to free a friend from jail.

1990's Dances with Wolves, while hailed by mainstream audiences and providing jobs for many Lakota actors, has also been cited as a return to the White savior narrative in film. In the film U.S. soldiers capture John Dunbar (Kevin Costner) and take him as a prisoner. Native Americans race onto the scene and kill all of the U.S. soldiers while none of the Native Americans appear to have been killed. Some of them receive injuries, but they are portrayed as strong and immune to the pain. However, Dunbar then becomes part of the tribe and leads the Lakota against their rivals, the Pawnee, and later helps them escape the same army he once served. The final credits of the film suggest that Lakota people are now extinct, which a few criticized.

Native Filmmaker Chris Eyre (Southern Cheyenne) wrote and directed the film Smoke Signals (1998) which has been selected for preservation in the National Film Registry for being "culturally, historically, or aesthetically significant". It is one of few films featuring Native American characters and directed by a Native filmmaker (along with Chickasaw filmmaker Edwin Carewe's early films) that received theatrical distribution. Smoke Signals was written, directed, and acted in by Native Americans. Like Powwow Highway, it is also a road movie and buddy film that examines friendship, fatherhood, and the roles of tradition versus modernity in Indian Country.

In The Doe Boy (2001) a Cherokee boy is nicknamed Hunter, after accidentally killing a female deer instead of a buck during his first hunting trip. The disappointment of his father and the distance between them is compounded by the physical limitations placed on Hunter to avoid injury. Breaking away from his father and overprotective mother, he meets with a girlfriend and falls in love with her, and drawing on the wisdom of his full-blood grandfather, Hunter gradually discovers love and a true sense of his possibilities. Later on his father was accidentally shot and killed by hunters. Hunter meets with the buck deer and decides not to kill the buck.

In Buffalo Dreams (2005) Josh Townsend has to move again with his mother and father, astrophysics researcher Dr. Nick Townsend, to a New Mexico small town. While working on the copy machine, Josh gets bored and decides to work for the Native American family tribal buffalo reserve, working with Navajo clan elder John Blackhorse's cynical grandson Thomas and his buddy Moon. Kyle's cyclist gang invites him for a bike ride which Josh joins their group, and he takes them to a secret waterfall where they spray-paint graffiti in the sacred site and litter the ground, Josh gets into trouble with John, and he apologizes to John's family and challenges his rival Kyle to a mountain bike race. During the race the buffalos escape and stampede towards town, and Josh and his friends gather up the buffalos to save their small town from getting stampede.

The New World (2005) offers a largely fictionalized retelling of the relationship between John Smith and Pocahontas. John Smith arrives to the Americas with the Pilgrims and is immediately captured by a Native American tribe. The film did offer several myths about Pocahontas, changing her into an adult so the film can be made into a love story. In reality, Pocahontas was a child of about ten she met John Smith, and most scholars agree that some of the events in the film never took place.

== Native Americans in animation ==
- Pinocchio (1940): an animated film produced by Walt Disney. During the Pleasure Island scene, characters gather in Tobacco Road, and there are six racist caricatures of Native American Chiefs wearing headdresses, smoking peace pipes, and throwing out free cigars to the crowd.
- Peter Pan (1953): an animated film produced by Walt Disney. A major scene in Peter Pan involves the Darling children, Wendy, John and Michael Darling, the Lost Boys and Peter Pan celebrating at the Indian camp after Peter rescues Tiger Lily, the daughter of the chief, from Captain Hook and Mr. Smee. This scene includes the song, "What Made the Red Man Red?", that features racist caricatures of Native Americans.
- The Good, the Bad, and Huckleberry Hound (1988): an animated parody television film directed by Charles August Nichols and Ray Patterson with executive producers William Hanna and Joseph Barbera. The subplot of this film involves Huckleberry Hound suffering an amnesia after the rocket crashes down towards the village of Native American dogs where he is found by a girl hound, Desert Flower. There, Huck must past the test to earn the blessing of Desert Flower's father the chief who will allow him to marry her.
- An American Tail: Fievel Goes West (1991): an animated film by Phil Nibbelink and Simon Wells with producer Steven Spielberg for Amblin Entertainment by Universal Pictures. While Tiger is lost in the desert, he is ambushed by a Native American mice tribe who captures Tiger and mistakes him for a god. Later on, Fievel gets caught by a hawk and the Native American mice shoot it down, and Fievel falls and reunites with Tiger.
- Pocahontas (1995): a Disney animated film. In this film, John Smith, while on the voyage to Jamestown encounters Pocahontas and the Powhatan tribe. Conflict between the European settlers and Native Americans ensues, as tension ramps up between the two groups over land. Before a battle between the two groups begins, Pocahontas saves the life of John Smith and prevents the war. Though presented as historical, the story is highly fictionalized with Pocahontas and John Smith ending up falling in love with each other. Critics of Disney's Pocahontas say that it presents the idea that the only good native is one that helps white people. It is argued that Pocahontas is portrayed as a princess for protecting John Smith while the other native people are presented as savages.
- An American Tail: The Treasure of Manhattan Island (1998): an animated film directed by Larry Latham for Universal Studios Home Video. Fievel and Tony discover that an ancient treasure lies underneath Manhattan in an abandoned subway where they meet a Native American mice tribe called Lenape, during which they meet a girl mouse Cholena. The sachem mouse, Chief Wulisso, decides to send his daughter Cholena to the surface to see if they have "changed their ways".
- Spirit: Stallion of the Cimarron (2002): a DreamWorks animated film. While on his journey back to the homeland, the titular horse was captured by the Native American tribe called the Lakota after escaping with a young brave named Little Creek, who was also captured by the American Cavalry and meets Little Creek's painted mare, Rain, whom he falls in love with.
- Brother Bear (2003): an animated film produced by Disney that follows the story of an Inuk young man named Kenai as he pursues the grizzly bear that killed his older brother, Sitka. However, his vengeance against the bear angers the Spirits. As punishment, the Spirits transform Kenai into a bear. In order to be human again, Kenai must travel to a mountain where the Northern Lights touches the earth.
- Avatar: The Last Airbender (2005–2008): an animated fantasy series. The Northern and Southern Water Tribes have elements based on various North American indigenous cultures.
- The Camp Lazlo episode "Lumpus vs. the Volcano" has Lazlo, Raj, Clam and Slinkman dress up as Native Americans to escape from the volcano itself, which, as a result, turns into a chicken pot pie, Lumpus' favorite food. Deputy Doodle Doo is the mascot for his own chicken pot pie company.
- The My Little Pony: Friendship is Magic episode "Over a Barrel" (S1E21) has buffalo that take visual cues from Native Americans, as well as a character named Little Strongheart, a young female brown buffalo.
- Spirit: Riding Free (2017-2021): a DreamWorks animated series. Season 3 features an episode where the main characters and their horses meet a young Tuckapaw teen named Mixli, who lives alone with his horse, Crow, in a forest.
- Molly of Denali (2019–present): Molly of Denali is an animated series following the adventures of Molly, a 10-year-old Alaska Native girl, her friends Tooey and Trini, and her dog Suki. Molly of Denali is the first nationally distributed children's to feature an Alaska Native as the main character and protagonist.

== Protest ==
In 1973, American actor Marlon Brando declined an Academy Award in protest for the representation of Native Americans in Hollywood cinema, citing killing of helpless unarmed Indigenous peoples and the theft of their territory.

== Whitewashing of Native American characters ==
Whitewashing in film refers to the historic phenomenon stemming from the early 1900s where white actors have been cast for roles not meant for them. Instead of hiring someone that fits the intended race/ethnicity of the character, a white person is traditionally given that role. This is not unique to one racial or minority group; from Black, to Asian, and to Native American, many marginalized groups in America have felt the effects of whitewashing in the film industry.

Whitewashing is two-pronged in effect, for not only does it impede Native American representation in film, but it also forces them into stereotypical roles. The tropes of the savage Native American or the Native American at the mercy of white people have long been recycled for years. This allows Hollywood, a predominantly white industry from top to bottom, to continue to gatekeep access to coveted film roles. In 2017, roughly 70% of the characters in the top Hollywood releases for that year were white. That year, roughly 60% of the US population was white, showing a disproportionate representation of white people in Hollywood. This also reinforces many of the stereotypes many people possess regarding Native Americans, because there hasn't been a significant culture change as yet regarding how Native Americans are portrayed in mainstream American media. Furthermore, white actors have never faced a shortage of roles available to them in Hollywood, while Native Americans and other marginalized groups continue to experience this.

=== Examples ===
- In The Legend of Walks Far Woman (1982), actress Raquel Welch played a Sioux warrior who killed her husband and was banished from her tribe. Welch played the role despite being white.
- In Outrageous Fortune (1987), white comedian George Carlin appropriates Native culture in his role as Frank Madras, a scout.
- X-Men Origins: Wolverine (2009) Lynn Collins plays the (Blackfoot/Niitsítapi) character Silver Fox.
- In The Last Airbender (2010), M. Night Shyamalan adaptation of the animated series Avatar: The Last Airbender several Asian and Native American characters were played by white actors.
- While Johnny Depp's portrayal of Tonto in Disney's The Lone Ranger (2013) has been accepted in Comanche groups, critics argue that Depp engaged in "redface" and casting him over Native actors was a racist decision.
- Pan (2015) cast white actor Rooney Mara as Tiger Lily, the Native American princess from Peter Pan.

== Documentaries ==
- Broken Rainbow (1985): Broken Rainbow details the forced relocation of the members of the Navajo tribe from Black Mesa, Arizona after the 1974 Navajo-Hopi Land Settlement Act. Many Navajo families were separated during this period of displacement in the U.S. government's attempt to ameliorate perceived issues between the Hopi and Navajo tribes. This documentary underscores several issues that indigenous communities across the United States face today; the growing desire to acquire indigenous lands for capitalist ventures. At stake are mining rights, land boundaries, and extraction for uranium, gas, oil, and other raw materials. Directed by Victoria Mudd, it won the Academy Award for Best Documentary in 1986. The cast includes the voice narrations of Martin Sheen, Buffy Sainte-Marie, Burgess Meredith, and others.
- Imagining Indians (1992): Imagining Indians is a 1992 documentary film produced and directed by Native American filmmaker, Victor Masayesva Jr. (Hopi). The documentary attempts to reveal the misrepresentation of Indigenous culture and tradition in Classical Hollywood films through interviews with different Native actors and extras from various tribes throughout the United States. It stars Shirley Atene, Karmen Clifford, Marvin Clifford, and others. The cast is entirely Native American, pulling indigenous people from the Amazon, Montana, Arizona, and other places. It is considered one of Masayesva's more provocative pieces of cinema, as it delves into the complexities surrounding white perception of Native American culture and identity. The film also touches upon the invasive nature of Hollywood in terms of filming on reservations. Director Masayesva said that The Dark Wind (1991) intruded on his village to film when he was younger, and he felt the duty to share stories like these with the outside world.
- The Canary Effect (2006): The Canary Effect is an examination of the effects of the United States and its policies on Indigenous communities. Some of these policies include forced schooling of children outside Native American communities, mass killings, forced female sterilisation, and more. It was directed by Robin Davey, a British musician, and Yellow Thunder Woman, who hails from the Yankton Sioux and Rosebud Sioux reservations of South Dakota. Both of them are members of the LA pop group The Bastard Fairies. The film first premiered at the Tribeca Film Festival in New York, and in 2006 it won the Stanley Kubrick Award at the Traverse City Film Festival in Michigan. The cast includes Charles Abourezk and Ward Churchill, author, former professor, and one of the leaders of the American Indian Movement of Colorado since the 1980s.
- Reel Injun (2009): Reel Injun is a 2009 Canadian documentary film directed by Cree filmmaker Neil Diamond, Catherine Bainbridge, and Jeremiah Hayes that explores the portrayal of Native Americans in film. Reel Injun is illustrated with excerpts from classic and contemporary portrayals of Native people in Hollywood films and interviews with filmmakers, actors and film historians, while director Diamond travels across the United States to visit iconic locations in motion picture as well as American Indian history. The documentary chronicles the journey of Native Americans in film over roughly a century, with particular attention on the transition from the silent era of Hollywood to today. It utilises clips from different eras of film, and Diamond meets with famous filmmakers such as Clint Eastwood to learn more about the transformation of the Native American image onscreen. Other cameos include Robbie Robertson (soundtrack composer), Graham Greene (Native American actor), Wes Studi (Native American actor), Jim Jarmusch (filmmaker), Chris Eyre (filmmaker), Jesse Wente (Native Canadian critic and program director), and Angela Aleiss (scholar and author). Diamond heads to famous locations such as Monument Valley, where many Westerns were filmed, and South Dakota's Black Hills, the home of several notable Native Americans.
- Inventing the Indian (2012): Inventing the Indian is a 2012 BBC documentary, initially broadcast on October 28, 2012, that explores the stereotypical view of Native Americans in the United States in cinema and literature. Directed by Chris Cottam, the documentary is presented by Rich Hall, an American comedian. The cast also includes Dave Bald Eagle, Ailema Benally, and Milton Bianis. Hall attempts to dismantle some of the pervasive stereotypes that beleaguer the Native American community to this day by heading to indigenous areas in Arizona, South Dakota, and other places as well. He examines the way Native Americans have been portrayed on screen in films such as Soldier Blue and A Man Called Horse, while also looking at literary representations of indigenous peoples, in books like The Last of the Mohicans and Bury My Heart at Wounded Knee.

== Prominent Native American actors ==
Early Native Americans in Film

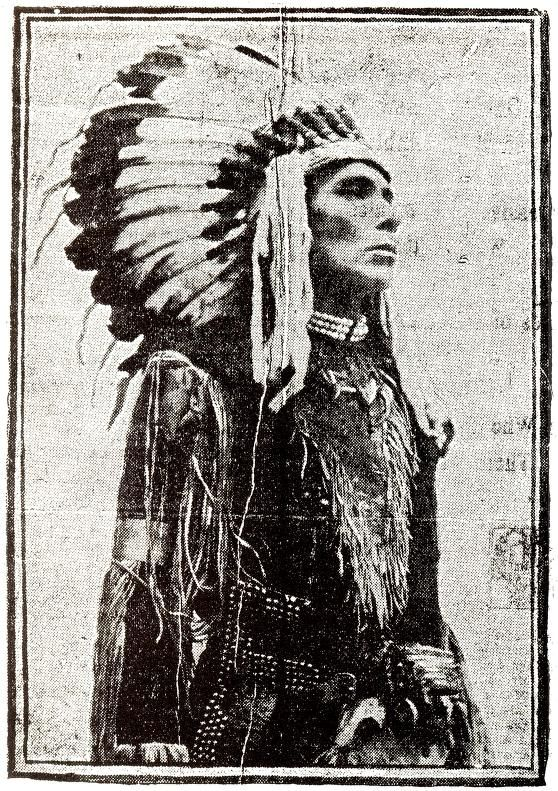
Dark Cloud ( Abenaki, 1855–1918 ), First Nations film actor

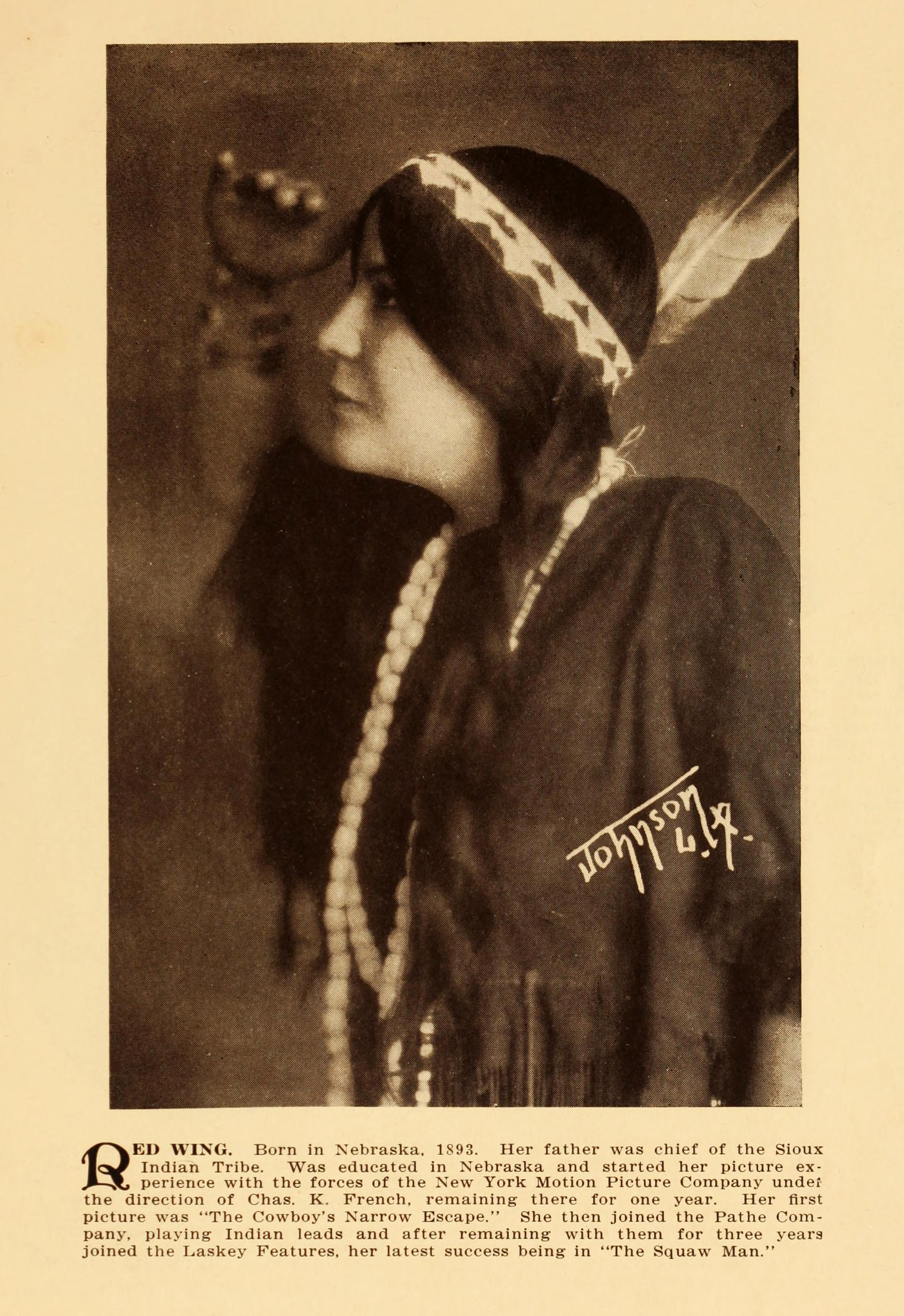
Lillian Margaret St. Cyr (Winnebago, 1873–1964), Native American film actress

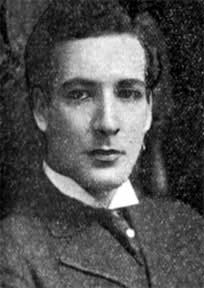
Edwin Carewe (Chickasaw, 1883–1940), the most prolific Native American director of feature films in Hollywood history

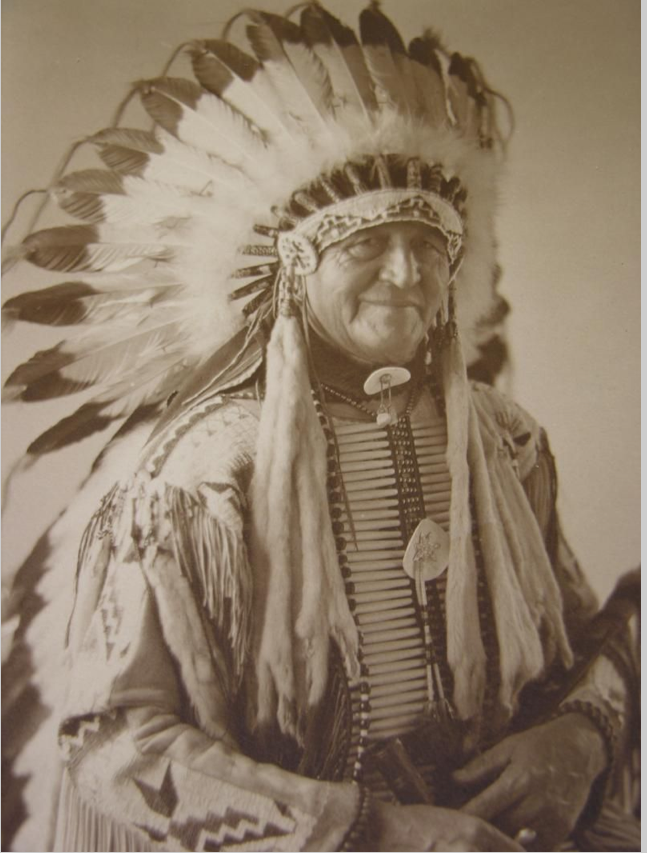
Luther Standing Bear (Sicangu and Oglala Lakota, 1868–1939), Native American film actor

Dark Cloud, also known as Elijah Tahamont, was an Algonquin chief born in St. Francis Indian Village, Quebec, Canada who lived from 1861 to 1918. He starred in films such as What Am I Bid? (1919), The Woman Untamed (1920), The Birth of a Nation (1915), and The Dishonoured Metal (1914).

Red Wing was born in 1884 to a Winnebago mother and French Canadian/Sauk father on the Winnebago Reservation in Nebraska. Early in her career, she starred in many small film roles. She was best known for starring in one of Hollywood's first feature Westerns, The Squaw Man (1914). She was married to James Young Deer, another indigenous actor and director.

Edwin Carewe, also known as Jay John Fox, was born in Gainesville, Texas, in 1883 to a white father and Chickasaw mother. An actor early in his career, Carewe started directing Hollywood films in 1914 during the silent era. Some of his films include Ramona (1928), Evangeline (1929), Resurrection (1927), and Joanna (1925).

Luther Standing Bear, also known as Ota K'Te (Plenty Kill), was born on the Pine Ridge Reservation in South Dakota and lived from 1868 to 1939. He is an Oglala Lakota writer and actor who started acting in 1912. Some of his filmography includes White Oak (1921), Cyclone of the Saddle (1935), and Union Pacific (1939).

Born in 1879, vaudeville performer Will Rogers to mixed-race Cherokee parents in Oolagah, Indian Territory (now modern Oklahoma). Rogers made his film debut in the year 1918 with Laughing Bill Hyde. He starred in numerous silent films, made the transition to talkies, began producing his own films, and went on to become the highest paid entertainer in Hollywood.

James Young Deer was born James Young Johnson in Washington D.C. in 1876. He hails from the Nanticoke people of Delaware, and worked both as a director and actor. Some of his films include The Stranger (1920), The Great Secret (1917), and Lieutenant Daring RN and the Water Rats (1924). From 1911 to 1914, James Young Deer was Head of Production/general manager for the Pathé Frères West Coast Studio located in Edendale, California. He was married to Native American actress Red Wing and died in 1946.

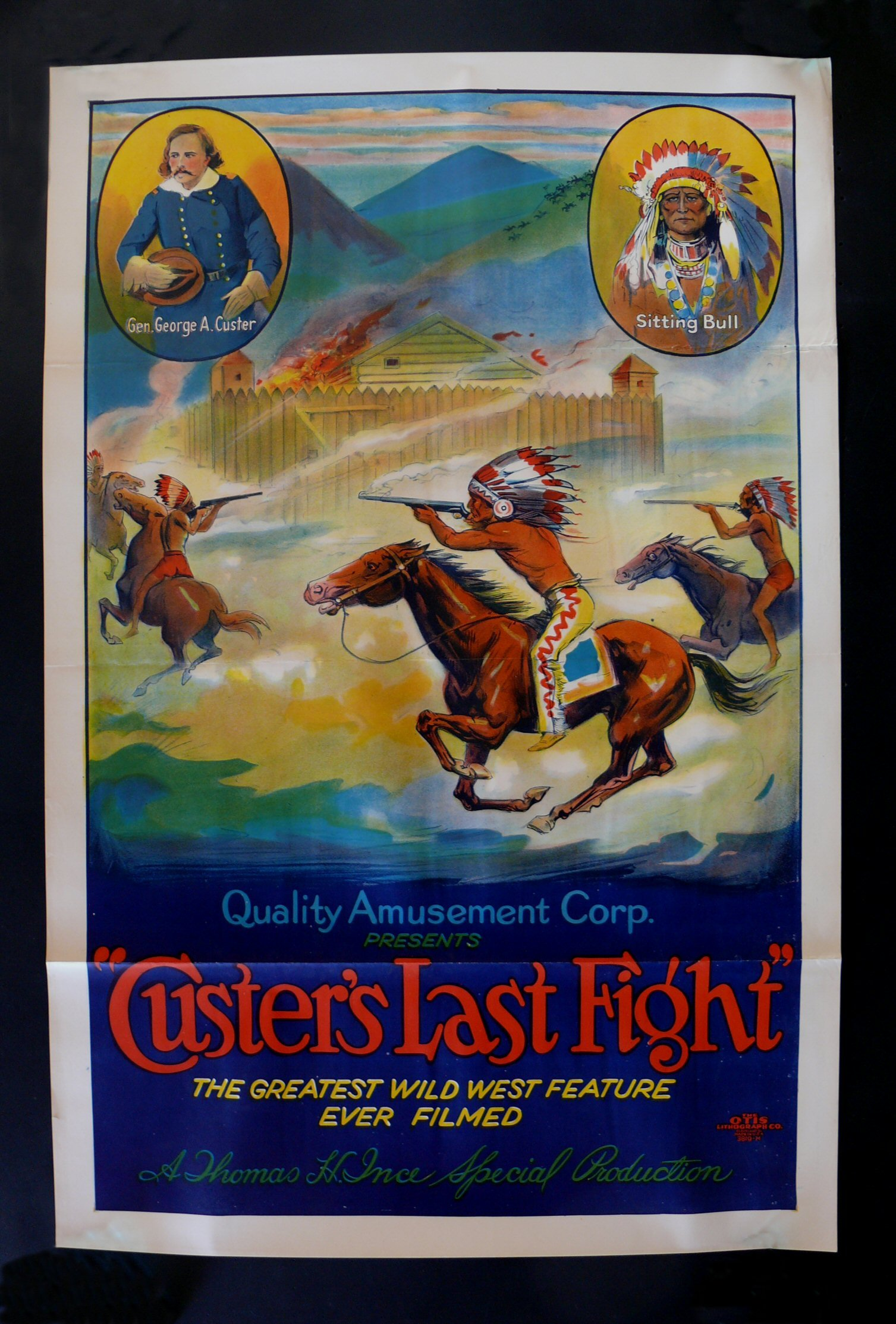
Custer's Last Fight (1912)

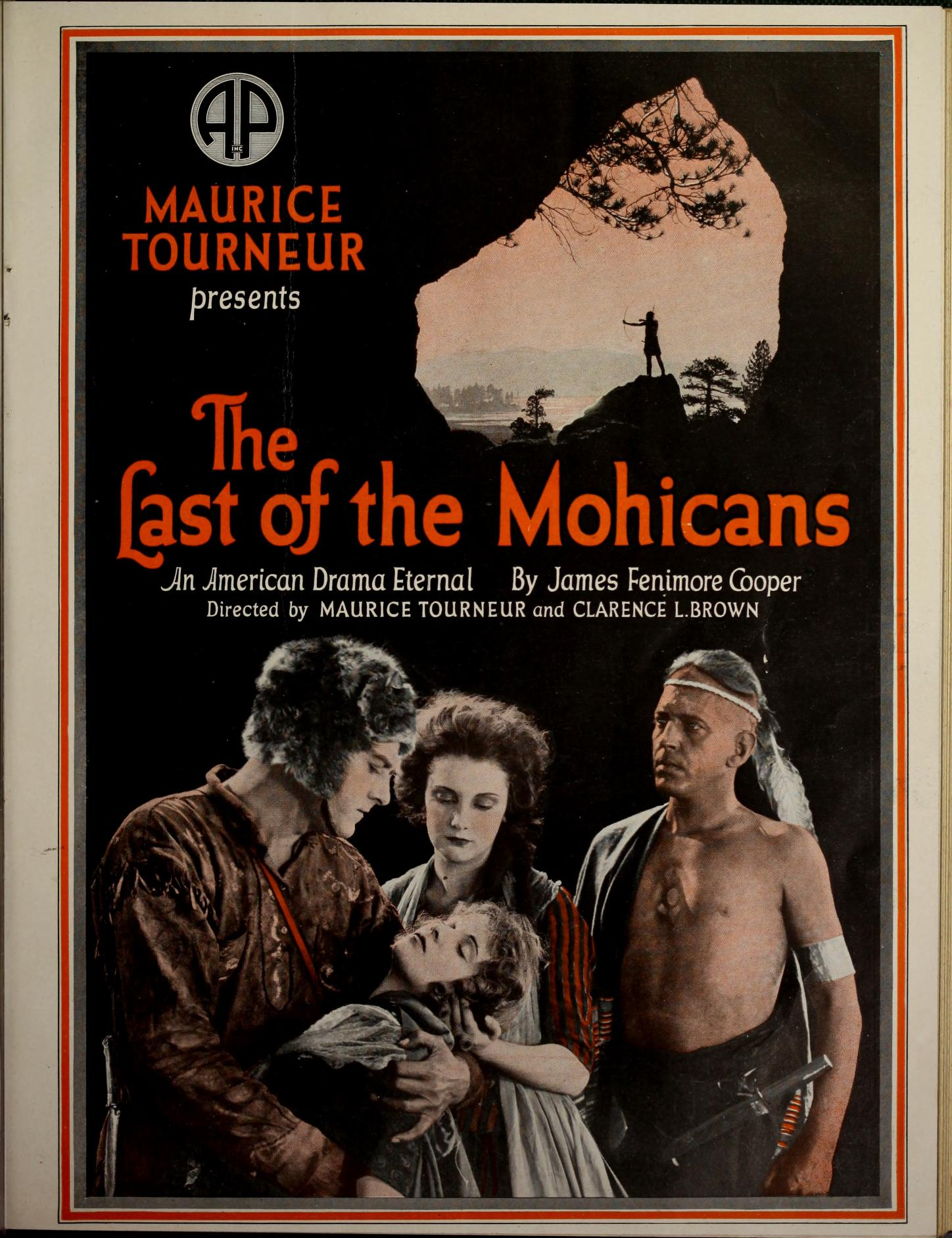
Film poster for The Last of the Mohicans (1920)

The Last of the Mohicans (1920) complete film

Wes Studi, born in 1947 in Oklahoma, is a Cherokee actor and professional horse trainer known for starring in over 80 films. Some of his work includes Dances with Wolves (1990), The Last of the Mohicans (1992), and Avatar (2009). He is credited with bringing versatile and masterful performances into Hollywood which have helped to dismantle some of the stereotypes surrounding Native Americans within the industry. In 2019, Studi received the Governors Award, an honorary award that commemorates the lifetime performance of an actor each year. Studi is just the second actor to receive an award for performances in film, following Ben Johnson in 1972.

Born in South Dakota, Russell Means was an Oglala Lakota Dakota Native American who lived from 1939 to 2012. Means was the first director of the American Indian Movement, which was originally created to fight poverty and police brutality amongst American indigenous communities. He fought for the rights of indigenous people worldwide, and is known for giving a televised speech in 2000 where he said he prefers the label 'Indian' to 'Native American' because everyone born in the United States should be considered a Native American. He also ran an unsuccessful presidential campaign in 1987 as a member of the Libertarian party. He has starred in films such as The Last of the Mohicans (1992), Natural Born Killers (1994) and Pocahontas (1995).

Will Sampson, from Oklahoma, was a member of the Muscogee Nation who lived from 1933 to 1987. He received his big acting break with the role "Chief" Bromden in One Flew Over the Cuckoo's Nest (1975), one of only three films to win the Big Five Academy Awards. Sampson was also known for starring in films such as The Outlaw Josey Wales (1976), Orca (1977), and The White Buffalo (1977). After dying in 1987, he was buried on the reservation that he grew up on.

Floyd Westerman, who also went by 'Red Crow', was a Sisseton Dakota actor, activist and musician born in 1936 on the Lake Traverse Indian Reservation in Roberts County, South Dakota. He starred in Dances with Wolves (1990), Dharma & Greg (1997), and Hidalgo (2004). Outside of film, Westerman has used his musical talents to bring greater awareness to issues facing indigenous people in the United States. He collaborated with artists such as Sting, Willie Nelson, and Don Henley to achieve such goals. He was also an ambassador for the International Indian Treaty Council, a multinational organization striving for the self-determination and autonomy of indigenous peoples across the world. He died in 2007.

== Visual sovereignty ==
Visual sovereignty is a way of looking at indigenous sovereignty outside of legal parameters defined by Seneca scholar Michelle H. Raheja as "a way of reimagining Native-centered articulations of self-representation and autonomy that engage the powerful ideologies of mass media," to take back the right to tell their own stories. Scholar Julia Boyd writes "White males have long dominated the film industry (. . .) Yet, Indian filmmakers have been on the rise in recent decades."

As an example of visual sovereignty, Igloolik Isuma Productions was the first Inuit owned production company known for producing films such as Atanarjuat: The Fast Runner. Isuma was formed in 1981 and created Inuit films in their native language Inuktitut. Isuma Productions also runs IsumaTV that hosts indigenous filmmakers. The Isuma Website states it hosts "over 7000 films and videos in 84 languages." Isuma Productions continues to be a leader when it comes to visual sovereignty.

Smoke Signals (1998): Native Filmmaker Chris Eyre wrote and directed the film Smoke Signals, which has been selected for preservation in the National Film Registry for being "culturally, historically, or aesthetically significant". It is one of few films featuring Native American characters and directed by a Native filmmaker (along with Edwin Carewe's early films) that received theatrical distribution. Smoke Signals was written, directed, and acted in by Native Americans. Like Powwow Highway, it is also a road movie and buddy film that examines friendship, fatherhood, and the roles of tradition versus modernity in Indian Country.

Written and directed by Mi'kmaq filmmaker Jeff Barnaby, Rhymes for Young Ghouls (2013) tells the story of Aila, played by Kawennáhere Devery Jacobs, as she goes up against Popper, an Indian agent and head of the nearby residential school. The reservation has been deeply affected by the residential school, partaking in the use of drugs and alcohol in order to forget the trauma inflicted by the school system. Rhymes for young ghouls is a revenge story against the Canadian residential school system and offers a path towards decolonization through educating people on the residential school system and opening up dialogue as a means to decolonization. Written and acted in by Natives, Rhymes for young ghouls exemplifies visual sovereignty.

Another Jeff Barnaby film, Blood Quantum (2019) is about a zombie apocalypse where only Mi'gmaq people are immune. Barnaby explores life in a post-colonial society through the lens of a zombie apocalypse where they must resist and fight against their oppressors and avoid extinction. Barnaby once again used a native cast to tell a native story showcasing visual sovereignty.

Written and directed by the Cree-Métis filmmaker Danis Goulet, Night Raiders (2021) takes place in a dystopian post-war North America where children are owned by the state. Night Raiders is in scathing commentary on Native residential schools and the kidnapping of children by the state to be placed in these schools. The film stars Elle-Máijá Tailfeathers, a Blackfoot and Sámi actress, as Niska and Brooklyn Letexier-Hart as Waseese.

Written and directed by Chloé Leriche, Before the Streets (French: Avant les rues) is a 2016 Canadian drama film Set among the Atikamekw people of northern Quebec, the film stars Rykko Bellemare as Shawnouk, a man undertaking the process of restorative justice after accidentally killing someone in the process of committing a crime.

Also by Her, And the tellings of Elders from Manawan, Atikamekw Suns (French: Soleils Atikamekw) is a 2023 Canadian drama film, written, produced, and directed by Chloé Leriche. The film centers on the true story of five youths from the Atikamekw First Nation community of Manawan who were found dead in a truck in the nearby river in 1977, with police investigation remaining inconclusive to this day about whether the truck driving into the river was a simple accident or a racially motivated attack.

Directed and produced by Riley Keough and Gina Gammell—in both of their respective feature directorial debuts—from a screenplay by Keough, Gammell, Franklin Sioux Bob and Bill Reddy. It stars Jojo Bapteise Whiting and Ladainian Crazy Thunder. War Pony is a 2022 American drama film, Follows the intertwined lives of two young Lakota boys living on the Pine Ridge Indian Reservation.

Reservation Dogs is an American comedy-drama television series created by Sterlin Harjo (Muscogee/Seminole) and Taika Waititi for FX Productions. It follows the lives of four Indigenous teenagers in rural Oklahoma, as they spend their days hanging out and committing crimes to earn enough money to leave their reservation community. It is the first American series to feature all Indigenous writers and directors, along with an almost entirely Indigenous North American cast and crew.

== See also ==
- List of Native American actors
- List of films featuring colonialism
- Karl May
- Indian Wedding Blessing
- Native American Film and Video Festival
- Indian burial ground trope
- Plastic Shaman
- Pre-Code Hollywood
- Spaghetti Western
- Reel Injun, a documentary
- Native Americans in popular culture
- Native Americans in children's literature
- Native Americans on Network TV (2013)
- Stereotypes about indigenous peoples of North America
- 2022 Hollywood apology to Sacheen Littlefeather
