= The Mended Lute =

1909 film directed by D. W. Griffith

- Directed by: D. W. Griffith
- Written by: Stanner E. V. Taylor
- Produced by: American Mutoscope and Biograph Company
- Starring: Florence Lawrence
- Cinematography: Billy Bitzer
- Distributed by: American Mutoscope and Biograph Company
- Release date: August 5, 1909
- Running time: 11 minutes
- Country: United States
- Languages: Silent; English intertitles

The Mended Lute is a 1909 American short silent Western film directed by D. W. Griffith and starring Florence Lawrence. It was produced by the American Mutoscope and Biograph Company.

== Cast ==
- Florence Lawrence – Rising Moon
- Frank Powell – Chief Great Elk Horn
- Owen Moore – Little Bear
- James Kirkwood – Standing Rock

uncredited

- Arthur V. Johnson – Indian
- Alfred Paget – Indian
- Mack Sennett – Indian
- Henry B. Walthall – Indian
- Red Wing – Indian
- James Young Deer – Indian
