= Cinecon =

American film festival, fan convention since 1964

The Cinecon Classic Film Festival (a.k.a. Cinecon) is a film festival and a film-collecting fan convention held, since 1964, on Labor Day weekend, for five days, in Los Angeles.

"The first Cinecon was sponsored by 8mm Collector publisher Samuel K. Rubin in Indiana, Pennsylvania, and for many years the Cinecon moved from city to city..."

Leonard Maltin, who grew up to become a film critic and film historian, started attending Cinecon as a 14-year-old boy. He attended every Cinecon from 1965 to 1978, skipped it to attend the coincident Telluride Film Festival in 1979, then alternated between the two through to 1991 – co-hosting Cinecon in 1990 and 1991, before locking in on the Telluride event.

In 1997, Nazi Germany propaganda filmmaker Leni Riefenstahl received a lifetime achievement award from Cinecon.

The 2006 Cinecon 42, 2009's Cinecon 45, and 2014's Cinecon 50, all took place at Grauman's Egyptian Theatre on Hollywood Boulevard. The 2006 and 2014 conventions also held some of their events a short walk away, at a hotel on Highland Avenue.

In 2017, Stan Taffel was President of Cinecon Classic Film Festival.

In 2019, Richard Adkins wrote: "In regards to Cinecon, Hollywood Heritage has the non-profit operator of Cinecon for the past three years. We have been associated with the festival since the museum was established inn 1985, but only began managing the festival following the passing of Robert S. Birchard (1950–2016) who was the president of Cinecon..."

In 2020 and 2021, due to the impact of the COVID-19 pandemic on film festivals, Cinecon 56 was held as a three day online event, streaming under the promotional banner Cineconline, while Cinecon 57 was held as a four day online event, streaming under the same Cineconline banner.

In 2022, Cinecon was held at American Legion Post 43, in Hollywood.
