= Hollywood Heritage Museum =

Museum in Los Angeles, California

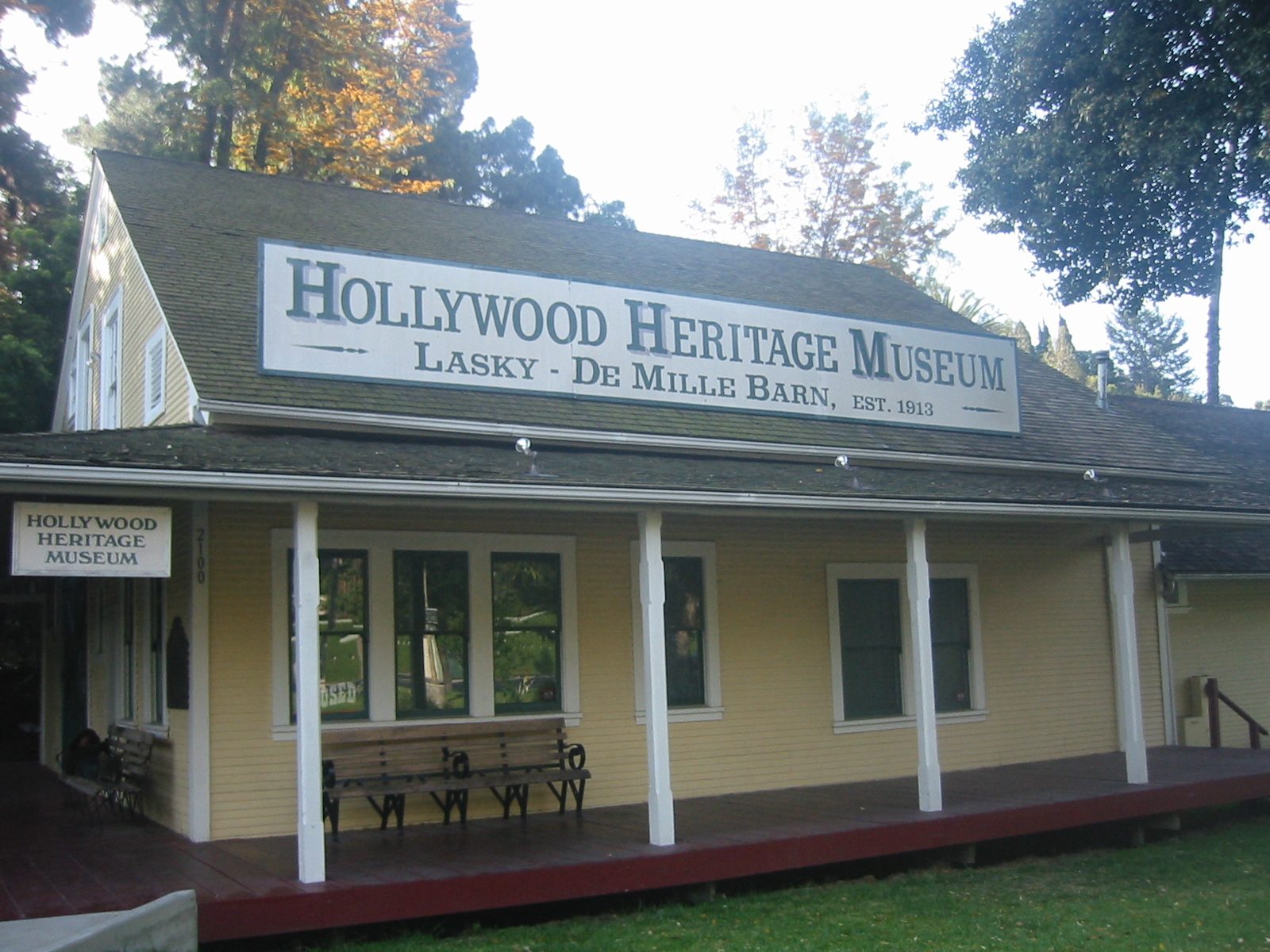
- Established: 1985
- Location: 2100 North Highland Avenue, Hollywood, California
- Coordinates: 34.108507°N 118.336100°W
- Type: Heritage centre
- Website: www.hollywoodheritage.org

The Hollywood Heritage Museum, also known as the "Hollywood Studio Museum," is located on Highland Ave. in Hollywood, California, United States.

The museum is opposite the Hollywood Bowl and is housed in the restored Lasky-DeMille Barn, which was acquired in February 1983 by Hollywood Heritage, Inc., and moved to its present site. It was dedicated on December 13, 1985.

Hollywood Heritage was founded in 1980 to address the preservation, restoration and maintenance of early Hollywood treasures. The first major success was acquiring, moving, and restoring the Lasky-DeMille Barn, opening it in 1985 as its museum. The museum features archival photographs from the silent era of motion pictures, movie props, historic documents and other movie related memorabilia. Also featured are historic photographs and postcards of the streets, buildings and residences of Hollywood during its golden age. Special events entitled 'Evenings at the Barn' are open to the public and regularly programmed including speakers, screenings and/or slideshows with a focus toward Hollywood's early history. Occasionally, historic silent films are screened in cooperation with the Silent Society.

== Building history ==
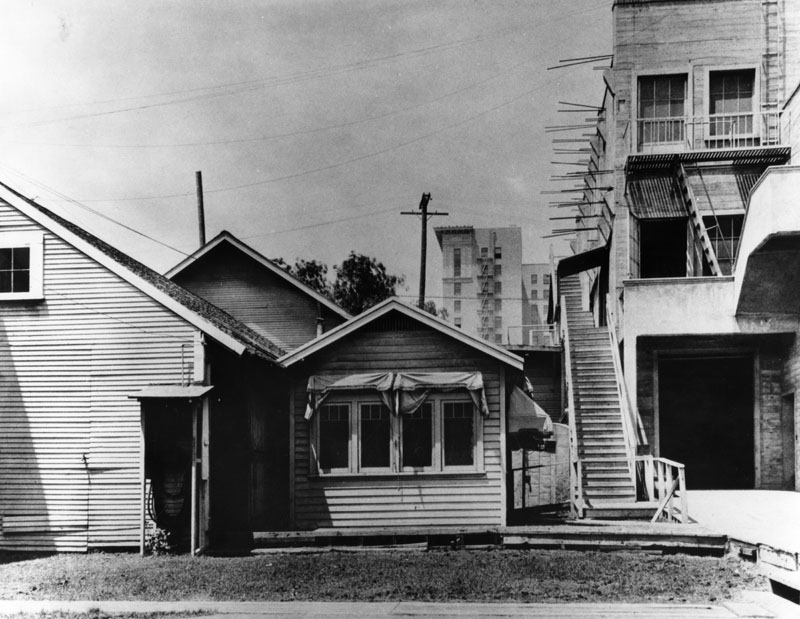
Lasky-DeMille Barn at original Hollywood location in 1913.

The building which houses the Hollywood Heritage Museum (Lasky-DeMille Barn; known from 1985 to 2003 as The Hollywood Studio Museum) was built in 1901 as a stable by the landowner, Col. Robert Northam, whose estate extended to both sides of Vine Street, the East side beginning at Selma and extending down to Sunset. A few other individually owned parcels were also contained within the eastern block. Col. Northam's home was on the West side, where the Hollywood Plaza Hotel is currently located. Col. Northam sold the property in 1903 to Jacob Stern, a realtor interested in the then-booming Hollywood real estate market. Hollywood became a city that year and the prohibitionist sentiments of the populace also made it illegal to show movies in Hollywood. Hollywood merged with the City of Los Angeles in 1910, and in October 1911, the first movie studio was located in the former Blondeau Tavern at Sunset Blvd. and Gower St. The Stern barn became the 2nd studio following the establishment of the Burns and Revier Company in May 1912. Louis Loss Burns (founder of Western Costume Company) and Harry Revier rented the barn from Mr. Stern sometime before May 1912, as a building permit to create an office within the barn was issued in May 1912. The Burns and Revier had the advantage of having a film laboratory on the lot; it was renamed the Burns and Revier Studio and Laboratory. The barn structure was used for dressing rooms and editing rooms, while the office served the heads of the company.

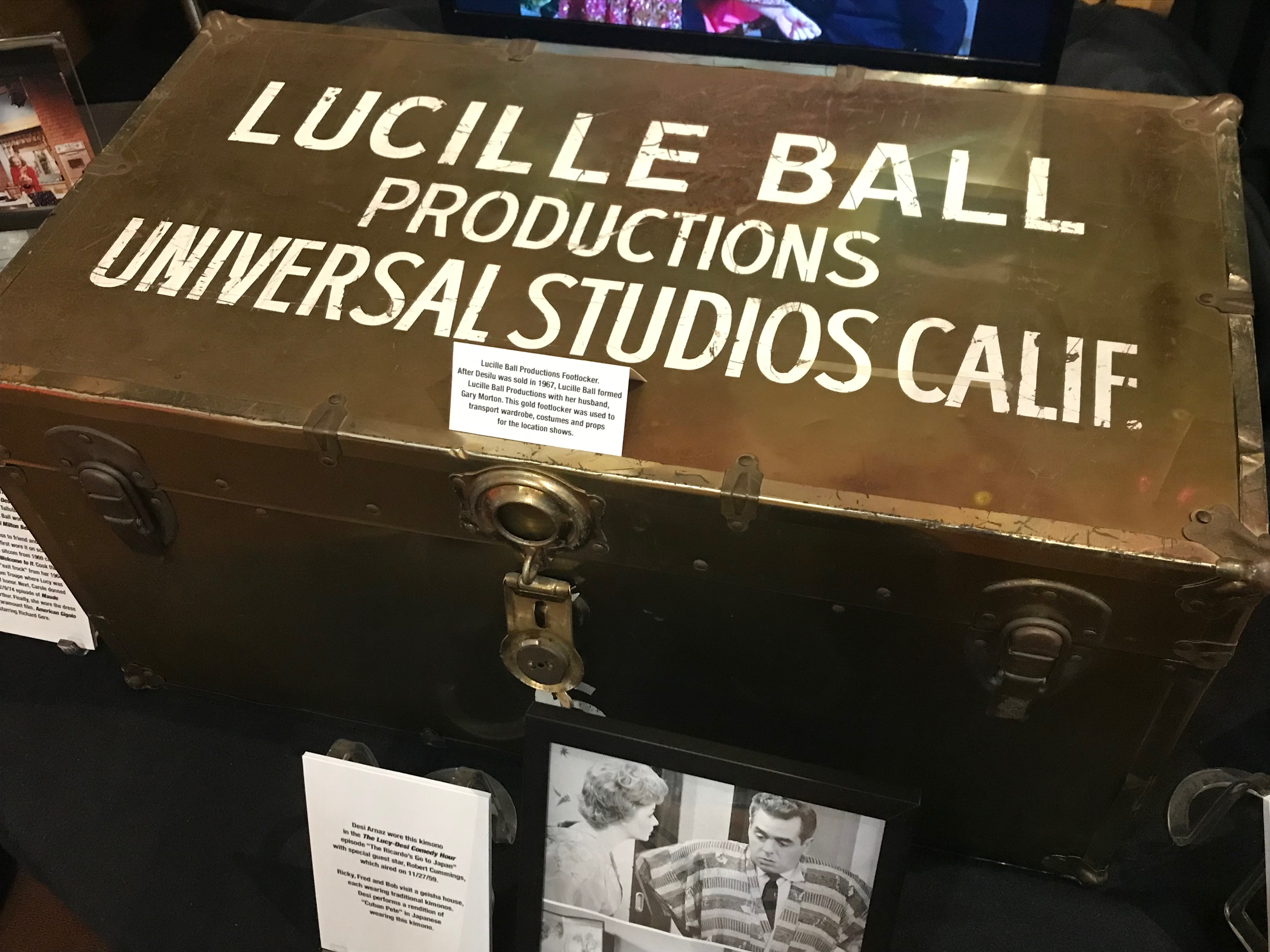

In December 1913, Cecil B. DeMille, as a partner in the newly formed Jesse L. Lasky Feature Play Company, which consisted of Lasky, DeMille and Lasky's brother-in-law, Samuel Goldfish (before name change to Samuel Goldwyn), traveled to California and met with Burns and Revier at the Alexandria Hotel in downtown Los Angeles. They drove DeMille to the studio and on December 22, a lease agreement between the three parties was executed on Hotel Alexandria stationery, followed by a second agreement between Stern and DeMille allowing them to sublease the Burns and Revier Studio. They leased the barn and studio facilities for $250.00 a month and began production of The Squaw Man (February 14, 1914), the first feature film to be produced in the Hollywood area. At the same time, DeMille bought out the interests of Burns and Revier and entered into lease extensions with Stern.

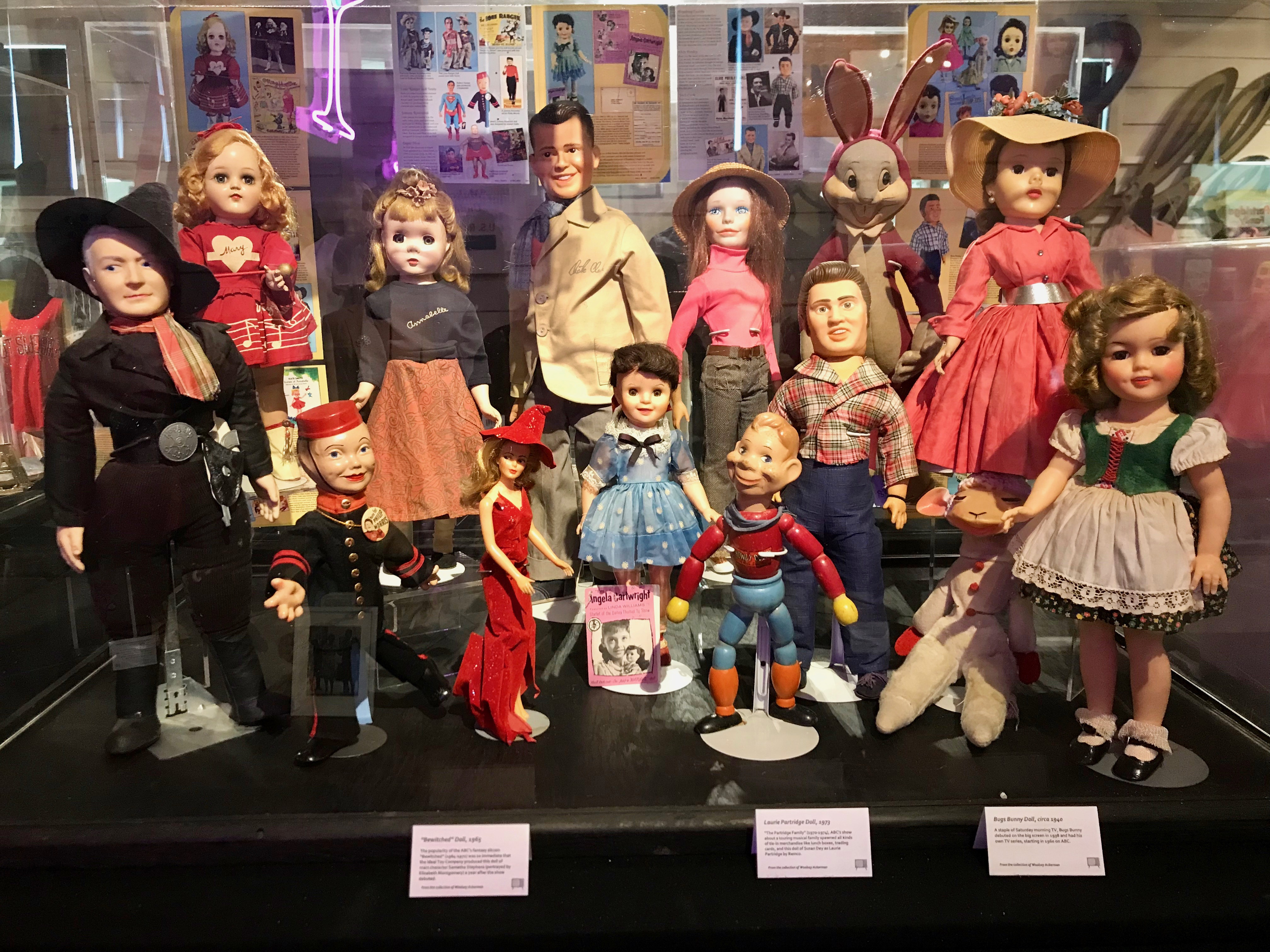

In 1916, the Lasky Company merged with Adolph Zukor's Famous Players to become The Famous Players - Lasky Corporation, and in 1917 merged with Paramount Distributing Company and would in time, become Paramount Pictures Corporation. In 1926, the company moved from the two square city block lot that had grown from the small barn, to a larger site composed of the former Brunton, Peralta, and United Studios on Melrose Ave., where Paramount Studio remains. The sentimental founders moved the barn to the new lot with them; it went through several uses as a film set, research library, conference area and later the Paramount gymnasium (1929). It remained as the gym until 1979. It was moved to a couple of different locations on the Paramount lot, its last location being adjacent to Cecil B. DeMille's office and becoming an integral part of Paramount's Western Street backlot. The barn is visible in a number of movies including "The Rainmaker" and in series such as "Bonanza."

In a ceremony attended by its founders, the Lasky-DeMille Barn was dedicated on December 27, 1956, as "Hollywood's First Major Film Company Studio" and designated California State Historic Landmark No. 554, representing the birth of the Hollywood motion picture industry and becoming the first landmark associated with it.

== Path to museum ==
In 1979 Paramount donated the building to the Hollywood Chamber of Commerce's Hollywood Historic Trust and it was moved to a parking lot on the West side of Vine Street.

Hollywood Heritage, Inc., a California State non-profit, was founded in 1980 by Marian Gibbons, Christy Johnson McAvoy, Frances Offenhauser McKeal, and Susan Peterson St. Francis. The organization's goal is the preservation, restoration and maintenance of early Hollywood treasures.

The building remained in the Vine Street parking lot until the Chamber and Paramount donated it to Hollywood Heritage. The Chamber moved it to the parking lot of The Hollywood Palace theater, where it was boarded up and fenced in until a permanent site could be found.

Hollywood Heritage learned of land on Highland Ave. that had been designated in 1960 for a film museum; the museum had not been built, but it had received a good deal of publicity due to a former marine who resisted vacating his home until such time as budgeted and approved plans for an actual museum had been put in place. Hollywood Heritage merged their efforts with the 1960 plan, moving the Lasky-DeMille Barn to the designated Highland Ave. site in February 1982; the following three years were spent in restoring the building with donated goods and services and with volunteer labor. The building was officially opened in December 1985, on the 72nd anniversary of the various contracts and agreements between the Jesse L. Lasky Feature Play Company, the Burns and Revier Company, and Stern.

It was closed from 1997 to 2003 due to a fire, which although damaging a small portion of the building, did not damage any part of the museum's permanent collection.

== California Historical Landmark Marker ==
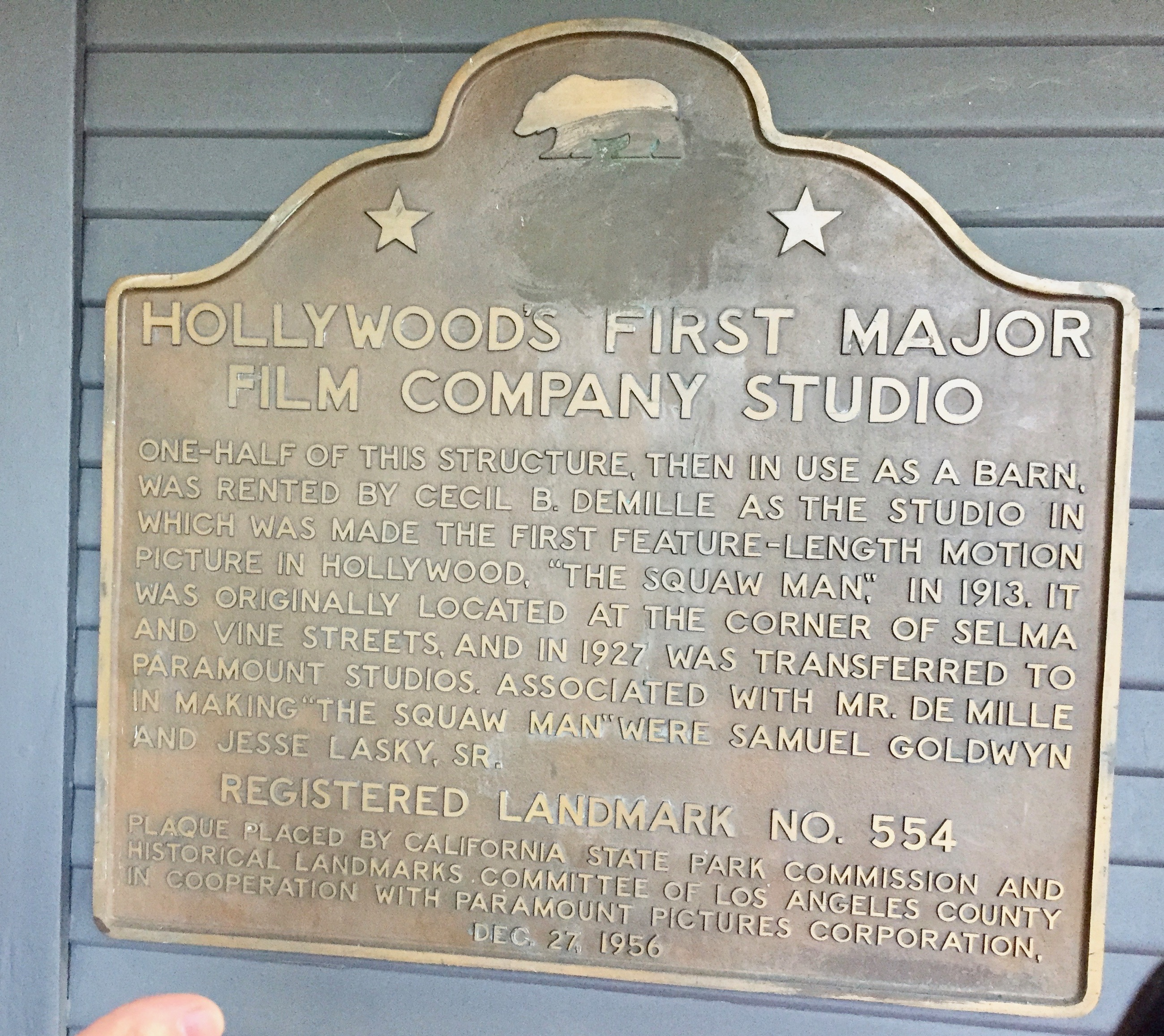
The Hollywood Heritage California landmark plaque.

The Lasky-DeMille Barn, already a California State Historic Landmark, was placed on the National Register of Historic Places in 2013, 100 years after the arrival of Lasky and DeMille.

California Historical Landmark Marker NO. 554 the site reads:

- NO. 554 CECIL B. DeMILLE STUDIO BARN - Cecil B. DeMille rented half of this structure, then used as a barn, as the studio in which was made the first feature-length motion picture in Hollywood-The Squaw Man-in 1913. Associated with Mr. DeMille in making The Squaw Man were Samuel Goldwyn and Jesse Lasky, Sr. Originally located at the corner of Selma and Vine Streets, in 1927 the barn was transferred to Paramount Studios.

== See also ==
- Cinecon
