= Lucille Young =

American actress

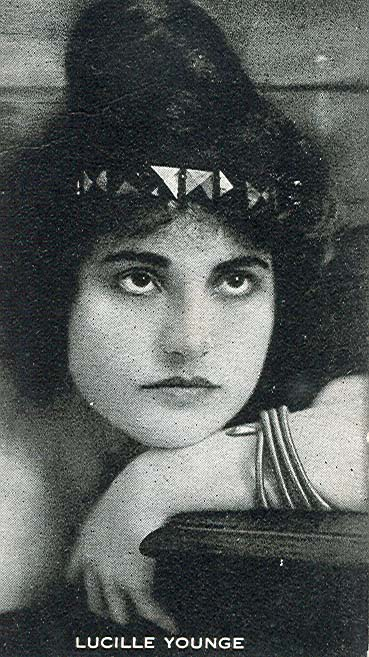
- Born: March 6, 1883; Lansing, Michigan, U.S.
- Died: August 2, 1934 (aged 51); Los Angeles, California, U.S.
- Other names: Lucille Younge; Lucile Young; Miss Young; Lulu Day
- Occupation: Actress
- Years active: 1905–1930
- Spouse: Hale Day (m. 1918, divorced)

Lucille May Young (March 6, 1883 – August 2, 1934) was an American actress of the early silent film era.

== Early life ==
Lucille May Young was born on March 6, 1883, in Lansing, Michigan, the daughter of Glendower Young (1858–1927) and Katherine Bessie "Kittie" Young (1861–1942). She had one brother, Howard Earl Young, who was born a year earlier. Some sources give Lucille's birth name as Lucia Medina, her birth year as 1892, and her birthplace as Lyon, France.

Her parents' marriage was short-lived, and her mother remarried to James Mortimer Terry, gaining Young a half-sister, Ethel Terry, who also became an actress (not to be confused with Ethel Grey Terry).

== Career ==
In 1905, Lucille and Ethel began performing in vaudeville in Detroit. One production noted in the Detroit Free Press was the "Isles of Spice". She's mentioned as a player in the vaudeville giant, Vaughan Glaser Company in 1907.

Around 1909 she made her way to New York, her early film work there being with The Thanhouser Company. Her first film roles were in 1910, appearing opposite George Larkin in An Indian's Gratitude, and in The Vicar of Wakefield alongside Martin Faust and Anna Rosemond. From 1910 to the end of 1914 Young appeared in thirty six films, most of which were short films. She appeared in another eighteen films in 1915, which would be her biggest year.

From 1916 to 1930 Young appeared in twenty four films, including The Daredevil alongside Tom Mix and Eva Novak, and opposite Marceau Moore in The Invisible Enemy. All but two of her film appearances during that period would be by 1920, with a five-year gap between 1920 and 1925 before she would have another film role, then a gap of five years until her final role in 1930. She died following an unsuccessful surgery on August 2, 1934, in Los Angeles.

== Personal life ==
In 1918, Young married an attorney, Lieutenant Hale Day, in San Diego. The marriage produced no children and ended in divorce.

== Selected filmography ==
- White Fawn's Devotion (1910)
- An Indian's Gratitude (1910)
- The Vicar of Wakefield (1910)
- The Scarlet Letter (1911)
- Hearts and Crosses (1913)
- The Spell of the Poppy (1915)
- The Woman from Warren's (1915)
- Daphne and the Pirate (1916)
- The Flying Torpedo (1916)
- The Invisible Enemy (1916)
- The Old Folks at Home (1916) as Lucia Medina
- The Heiress at Coffee Dan's (1916)
- The Soul of Satan (1917)
- Rose o' Paradise (1918)
- The Greatest Thing in Life (1918)
- Fuss and Feathers (1918)
- The Virtuous Thief (1919)
- The Terror (1920)
- The Daredevil (1920)
- The False Road (1920)
