= The Spell of the Poppy =

1915 film

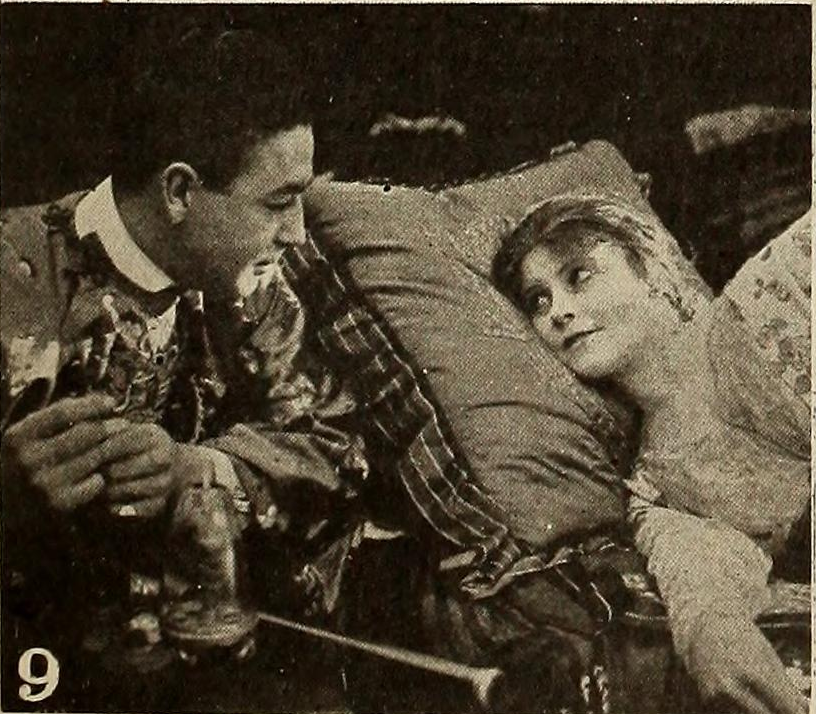
- Eugene Pallette in a publicity still
- Directed by: Tod Browning
- Starring: Eugene Pallette; Lucille Young
- Production company: Majestic Film Company
- Distributed by: Mutual Film
- Release date: May 9, 1915
- Running time: 2 reels
- Country: United States
- Language: Silent with English intertitles

The Spell of the Poppy is a 1915 American silent short drama film directed by Tod Browning. It concerns Manfredi, a young opium addict.

== Plot ==
This film is a cautionary tale about drug addiction that depicts the virtuoso pianist Manfredi who has become addicted to opium.

== Cast ==
- Eugene Pallette as Manfredi
- Lucille Young as Zuletta
- Joseph Henabery as John Hale
