= Native Americans on Network TV =

2013 book by Michael Ray FitzGerald

- Author: Michael Ray FitzGerald
- Language: English
- Genre: Non-fiction
- Publisher: Rowman & Littlefield
- Publication date: 2013

Native Americans on Network TV: Stereotypes, Myths, and the "Good Indian" (2013) is a book by Michael Ray FitzGerald, PhD, about American Indian characters on U.S. television.

FitzGerald argues that the most notable (i.e., long-running) characters, such as Tonto (The Lone Ranger), Cochise (Broken Arrow), Mingo (Daniel Boone), and Cordell Walker (Walker, Texas Ranger) have been those who enforced Euro-American norms. The book examines the traditional role of stereotypes and their functions in the rhetoric of colonialism, offering a critical analysis of images of the "Good Indian"—minority figures who enforce the dominant group's norms. All of these, FitzGerald argues, are variations of Defoe's Carib character Friday from his 1719 novel Robinson Crusoe.

== See also ==
- Inventing the Indian (2014)
