= White Fawn's Devotion =

1910 silent short film

- Directed by: James Young Deer (uncredited)
- Written by: James Young Deer (uncredited)
- Starring: Lucille Young
- Distributed by: Pathé Frères
- Release date: June 18, 1910
- Running time: 11 minutes
- Country: United States
- Language: Silent with English intertitles

White Fawn's Devotion: A Play Acted by a Tribe of Red Indians in America

White Fawn's Devotion: A Play Acted by a Tribe of Red Indians in America is a 1910 American silent dramatic short film. Although a few writers believe the film features Young Deer's wife, Lillian St. Cyr, otherwise known as Princess Red Wing as "White Fawn", the lead woman does not fit St. Cyr's description. IMDb now identifies the lead actress as Lucille Young. The movie was shot in New Jersey at 24fps.

White Fawn's Devotion was one of the earlier films shot in America by the French company Pathé. A reviewer in the New York Dramatic Mirror wrote that the film "proves to be interesting if we can forget the New Jersey scenery" and noted that "it is not quite clear where the devotion comes in, nor of what it consists."

In 2008, the film was selected for preservation in the United States National Film Registry by the Library of Congress, being deemed "culturally, historically, or aesthetically significant".

== Plot ==
A white settler named Combs, his Indian wife, White Fawn, and their daughter live in a Dakota log cabin. When Combs gets word that he is to inherit a large fortune, his Native American wife is upset. Believing that she will lose her husband if he returns East, she stabs herself with a knife. Her husband finds her and removes the knife, but their daughter sees him with the knife in his hand and her apparently dead mother. The girl, believing her father committed the murder, alerts the nearby Indian village. Several Indians then engage the settler in a long chase. When the settler is captured, the Indians intend to put him to death until White Fawn miraculously revives and informs the Indians of the truth. This ending, in which an interracial couple ends up together, is a rare occurrence for this period of film production. The surviving print, preserved by the Library of Congress, is missing a few feet at its end. This print was digitized for the Treasures from American Film Archives DVD set, therefore subsequent digital releases are also missing the ending. Contemporary publicity from Pathé fills in the resolution: "the Combs take their departure and return to their home, for he feels he will be happier with his family on the plains than if he goes east and claims his legacy."

== Production ==
The ancestors of James Young Deer (also known as J. Younger Johnston or James Young Johnson), the uncredited director and writer of White Fawn's Devotion, were members of the Nanticoke Indian Association, which is now a state-recognized tribe in Delaware. Young Deer was hired by Pathé Frères as a director and scenario writer and frequently worked in collaboration with his actress wife Lillian St. Cyr, also known by her stage name Princess Red Wing. Out of the more than 100 short and a few feature films he made, White Fawn's Devotion is one of fewer than 10 films of Young Deer's to have survived.
