= William Harben =

American writer

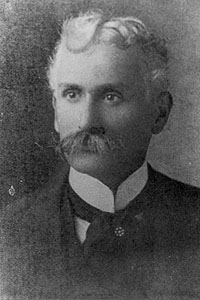

William Nathaniel Harben (5 July 1858 – 7 August 1919) was an American writer active in the early 20th century. He specialized in stories about the people of the mountains of Northern Georgia. He was sometimes credited as Will N. Harben or Will Harben.

== Early life ==
Harben was born in 1858 in Dalton, Georgia to a rich family. He grew up to be a merchant in that same town. At age 30, Harben started writing stories.

His father Nathaniel Parks Harben was a prominent southern abolitionist who served as a spy for the Union and later a scout for General Sherman. His family was forced to flee to the north when William was a small child, eventually returning to Dalton during reconstruction.

== Career ==
In 1889, Harben wrote his first bestseller, White Marie, a story of a white girl raised in slavery in the American South. After the publication of this novel, he moved his family to New York City.

Harben's next novel, Almost Persuaded (1890), was a religious novel. The novel gained enough attention that Queen Victoria requested a copy of it. Harben then published Mute Confessor (1892), a romantic novel, and Land of the Changing Sun (1894), a science fiction novel. He also produced three detective novels during this decade.

Harben achieved his greatest literary success with Northern Georgia Sketches (1900), a collection of short stories about Georgia "hillbillies". He became a protegee and friend of William Dean Howells. Two of his memorable characters were mountaineers Abner Daniel and Pole Baker, rustic philosophers and comedic characters.

Harben died in New York City in 1919 at age 61.

== Works ==
- White Marie: A Story of Georgia Plantation (1889)
- Almost Persuaded (1890)
- A Mute Confessor: The Romance of a Southern Town (1892)
- In the Year Ten Thousand (1892)
- The Land of the Changing Sun (1894)
- The Carruthers Affair (1898)
- The North Walk Mystery (1899)
- Northern Georgia Sketches (1900)
- Westerfelt (1901)
- The Woman who Trusted: A Story of Literary Life in New York (1901)
- Abner Daniel (1902)
- The Substitute (1903)
- The Georgians: A Novel (1904)
- Pole Baker: A Novel (1905)
- Ann Boyd (1906)
- Mam' Linda: A Novel (1907)
- Gilbert Neal: A Novel (1908)
- The Redemption of Kenneth Galt (1909)
- Dixie Hart (1910)
- The Fruit of Desire (1910)
- Jane Dawson: A Novel (1911)
- Nobody's (1911)
- Paul Rundel: A Novel (1912)
- The Desired Woman (1913) (1913 novel and screenplay for 1918 film)
- The New Clarion: A Novel (1914)
- The Inner Law (1915)
- Second Choice: A Romance (1916)
- The Triumph (1917)
- The Hills of Refuge (1918)
- The Cottage of Delight (1919)
- The Divine Event (1920)
- Love Never Dies (screenplay for 1921 film)
