= The Yaqui Girl =

1910 film by James Young Deer

- Directed by: James Young Deer
- Release date: December 31, 1910
- Country: United States
- Language: Silent

The Yaqui Girl is an American short film made in 1910. It was directed by James Young Deer, starring Virginia Chester. This was Chester's first silent film. The duration of the film is 1,000 feet (300m), which is approximately one hour. The film premiered on December 31, 1910, in the United States. This was the first production of Pathé Frères West Coast company, a new American version of a famous French film company.

== Cast ==
Virginia Chester appeared as 'Silver Love'. Chester starred in several films after her debut in The Yaqui Girl at the age of 14. Restitution was Virginia's first feature-length film. She died at the age of 30 from pulmonary tuberculosis.

- The Frenzy of Firewater (1912)
- A Shot In the Dark (1912)
- Fat Bill's Wooing (1912)
- When Uncle Sam Was Young (1912)
- Trapper Bill, King of Scouts (1912)
- A Four-Footed Hero (1912)
- Hash House Mashers (1915)
- Restitution (1918)
- The Demon (1918)
- The Vanity Pool (1918)
- The Outcasts of Poker Plat (1919)

== Plot ==
Set in Mexico, a beautiful young Indian maiden falls in love with a Mexican cavalier, who she later finds out is a bandit. He has several girlfriends on the side, and he later suffers for his actions by a gruesome fate. His original lover has him shot so he can no longer be with any other woman. There is no knowledge of any other characters.

== Production ==
The Yaqui Girl was filmed in the United States; mainly in New Jersey. There was also filming in Santiago Canyon, California. The cinematography process used in The Yaqui Girl was spherical. A 35mm Camera was used to shoot this film.

== Critical reception ==
Reviewers spoke on how the film did a poor job at depicting Indians and Mexicans. At the time, this was considered to be a racist remark.

== See also ==
- List of American films of 1910
