= Love Never Dies (1921 film) =

1921 film directed by King Vidor

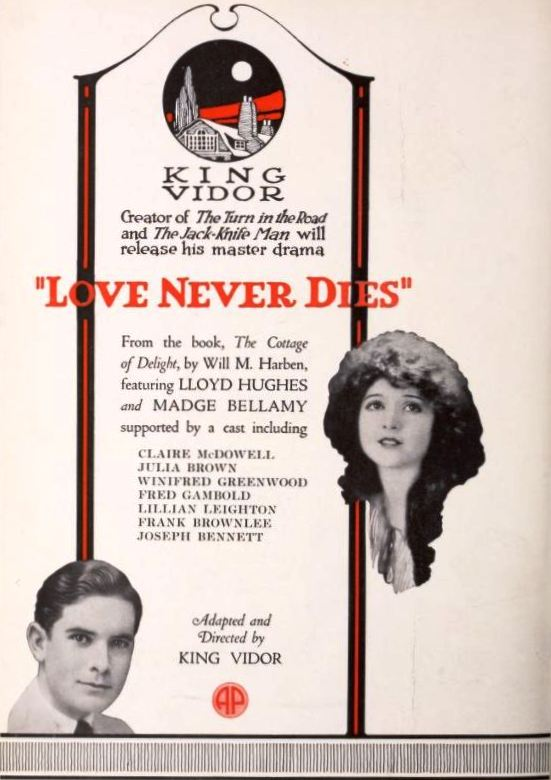
- Advertisement
- Directed by: King Vidor
- Written by: King Vidor (adaptation)
- Based on: "The Cottage of Delight" by William Nathaniel Harben
- Produced by: Cathrine Curtis
- Starring: Lloyd Hughes
- Cinematography: Max Dupont
- Distributed by: Associated Producers
- Release date: November 14, 1921
- Running time: 60 minutes
- Country: United States
- Language: Silent (English intertitles)

The full film

Love Never Dies is a 1921 American silent drama film directed by King Vidor. Prints of the film survive in several film archives.

== Plot ==
As described in a film magazine, John Trott (Hughes) overcomes the bad influence of a wretched home, becomes successful as a contracting engineer, and marries the beautiful Tilly Whaley (Bellamy). They settle down to a happy existence in their own cottage. Then a specter of his past appears, a drunken mother, and during his absence his wife is rushed home by her sanctimonious father Ezekiel Whaley (Brownlee) and is granted a divorce. John, accompanied by his foster sister, goes to a distant city. En route, the train is wrecked and he reports himself and the child killed. His wife marries a former sweetheart. Years later, John returns to the town and old love is renewed. The jealous husband attempts to kill John but is whipped in the encounter. The husband then decides to kill himself and is successful, despite John's valiant attempt to stop him. The couple are then reunited in their "cottage of delight."

== Cast ==
- Lloyd Hughes as John Trott
- Madge Bellamy as Tilly Whaley
- Joseph Bennett as Joel Eperson
- Lillian Leighton as Mrs. Cavanaugh
- Fred Gamble as Sam Cavanaugh (credited as Fred Gambold)
- Julia Brown as Dora Boyles
- Frank Brownlee as Ezekiel Whaley
- Winifred Greenwood as Jane Holder
- Claire McDowell as Liz Trott
- Maxine Elliott Hicks as Dora Boyles as a Teenager (uncredited)

== Production ==
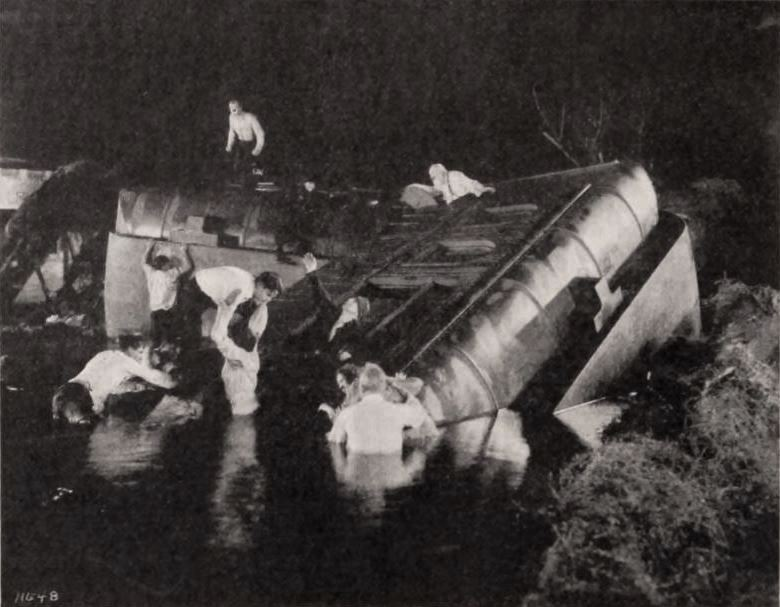
Train wreck scene from Love Never Dies.

Vidor's spectacular cattle stampede in his previous picture The Sky Pilot (1921) was admired by critics. Hoping to capitalize on that success, Vidor designed and built an elaborate model replica of a train and trestle and used it to stage a dramatic derailment. Impressed by this special effect demonstration, Thomas H. Ince agreed to finance the completion of Love Never Dies.
