= Imagining Indians =

- Directed by: Victor Masayesva, Jr
- Produced by: Victor Masayesva, Jr
- Release date: 1992
- Running time: 56 minutes
- Country: United States
- Language: English

Imagining Indians is a 1992 documentary film produced and directed by Hopi filmmaker, Victor Masayesva, Jr. The documentary attempts to reveal the misrepresentation of Indigenous Native American culture and tradition in Classical Hollywood films by interviews with different Indigenous Native American actors and extras from various tribes throughout the United States.

== See also ==
- Portrayal of Native Americans in film
- Stereotypes of Native Americans in North America
- Reel Injun (2009)
- Playing Indian
- Inventing the Indian (2012)
