= The Canary Effect =

2006 documentary film by Robin Davey

- Directed by: Robin Davey; Yellow Thunder Woman
- Written by: Robin Davey
- Produced by: Yellow Thunder Woman; Robin Davey
- Music by: Paul Pesco
- Release date: 2006
- Country: United States
- Language: English

The Canary Effect is a 2006 documentary film that looks into the effects that the United States and its policies have on the Indigenous peoples (Native Americans) who are residents. It premiered at the Tribeca Film Festival and won the Stanley Kubrick Award at the 2006 Traverse City Film Festival.

The movie was directed by Robin Davey and Yellow Thunder Woman, who are both members of LA Based alternative pop group The Bastard Fairies. The film's soundtrack was composed by guitarist Paul Pesco. The documentary was released on DVD in 2008.

== Synopsis ==
The documentary details several United States programs that have negative impacted the Native American population. It argues that several of the United States' actions against Native Americans, including the Sand Creek Massacre and the 1970 Family Planning Act, meet the United Nations' definition of genocide.

Additionally, the film also describes the numerous issues on Native American reservations. The documentary contends that several incidents on these reservations, including a suicide pact by 10 boys on the Cheyenne River Indian Reservation and the Red Lake Shootings, have been ignored by national media and the federal government.

The film features an interview with American Indian Movement leader Ward Churchill. The documentary's title comes from a quote by lawyer Felix Cohen:

Like the miner's canary, the Indian marks the shift from fresh air to poison gas in our political atmosphere, and our treatment of the Indians, even more than our treatment of other minorities, reflects the rise and fall of our democratic faith.
