= The Bastard Fairies =

US musical duo

- Origin: Los Angeles, California
- Genres: Alternative, New Weird America, Anti-folk
- Years active: 2005-2009
- Label: unsigned
- Members: Yellow Thunder Woman; Robin Davey
- Website: www.thebastardfairies.com

The Bastard Fairies were an American musical group from Los Angeles, California, formed in 2005. They are described as an "internet phenomenon," becoming at one point the No. 18 Most Subscribed (All Time) Musicians and No. 31 Most Viewed (All Time) Musician on YouTube. They achieved a measure of fame for a non-musical reason, after releasing a promotional video that received media attention on Fox News. The band's debut album, Memento Mori, was released in April 2007.

== Band biography ==
The band's website describes the group as being composed of two members, singer/lyricist Yellow Thunder Woman and guitarist/songwriter Robin Davey. Yellow Thunder Woman was a Native American ("Yellow Thunder Woman" being the English translation of her birth name, Wakinyan Zi Win), while her bandmate Davey is a British expatriate from Great Cheverell, near Devizes, Wiltshire, formerly in The Davey Brothers with his brother Jesse. The Davey Brothers album 'Monkey Number 09' was released on AN Records, a label owned by Dave Stewart of Eurythmics. Robin Davey and Yellow Thunder Woman, with Dave Stewart as executive producer, created an award-winning documentary film called The Canary Effect, which "takes an in-depth look at the devastating effect that U.S. policies have had on the Indigenous people of America." The Canary Effect won 'The Stanley Kubrick Award For Bold and Innovative Film Making' at Michael Moore's Traverse City Film Festival in 2006, and 'Best Music Video' Award at The American Indian Motion Picture Awards in 2006.

The band recorded their album Memento Mori "on a Mac" and has released twelve of its songs for free on their website as a means of "spreading the word about their music"; the version in stores includes five additional tracks. A track from that album, "The Boy Next Door," was featured on The L Word, episode eleven of the third season.

In August 2021, Yellow Thunder Woman died at the age of 40.

== Controversial video ==
The band released a promotional video entitled "The Coolest 8 Year Old In The World Talks About O'Reilly," featuring a young girl discussing a number of political, religious, and social issues. The video was featured on The O'Reilly Factor, whose host is mentioned in the title, and was described as "child abuse" and "emotional abuse" in a discussion between host Bill O'Reilly and lawyer/"child advocate" Wendy Murphy, who recommends shunning the child and her family. The band clarified the content of the video on the video's YouTube page:

OFFICIAL STATEMENT: THIS VIDEO FEATURES A TALENTED YOUNG ACTRESS PLAYING A FICTITIOUS CHARACTER. IT IS A COMMERCIAL FOR THE BAND 'THE BASTARD FAIRIES' AND DIRECTED BY AN AWARD WINNING DOCUMENTARY FILM MAKING TEAM.

As of May 21, 2026, the video has since been taken down. The original video has been reuploaded under unofficial accounts, all not reaching over 50,000 views.

== Discography ==
Albums:

- Memento Mori (2007)

EPs:

- Man Made Monster (2010)
- The Jesus Song and Other Stocking Fillers (2010)

Singles:

- A Venomous Tale (Alternate Version) (2010)
- Dirty, Sexy, Kill, Kill (2010)
