= James Young Deer =

American actor (1876–1946)

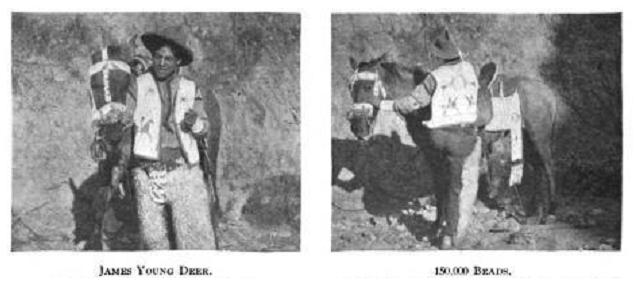
James Young Deer ca. 1910

James Young Deer (April 1, 1876 – April 6, 1946), also known as J. Younger Johnson or Jim Young Deer, was born James Young Johnson in Washington, D.C. Although he was identified in the early Hollywood trade paper Moving Picture World as of the Winnebago Tribe of Nebraska, his ancestry is of the Nanticoke Indian Association of Delaware.

He became an early film actor, director, writer, and producer. Together with his wife and partner Lillian St. Cyr, (Winnebago), the couple were labeled an "influential force" in the production of one-reel Westerns during the first part of the silent film era. Their films, along with several others of the silent era, were notable for portraying Native Americans in a positive light.

Questions were raised about Young Deer's purported Winnebago background when film historians were unable to verify much about his origins. He was not listed on the Winnebago tribal rolls in the early 20th century.

== Early life ==
Young Deer was born in the "Old Southwest" District of Washington, D.C. to George Durham Johnson and Emma Margaret Young. Census records indicated both his parents were classified as "mulatto," usually meaning mixed-race African American/European American. He would have been classified the same way. Young Deer (i.e., James Johnson) entered the U.S. Navy on October 8, 1898, for three years during the Spanish–American War, but he was apparently disillusioned with the Navy's "great prejudices."

Newspapers boasted about how he performed as a cowboy with the Barnum and Bailey Circus and Miller Brothers' 101 Ranch Wild West Show, riding as a son of the Wild West.

== Marriage and family ==
After meeting Lillian St. Cyr, who was living and working in Washington, D.C. for a Kansas senator, Young Deer and she married on April 9, 1906. She became an actress of the silent film era, known later by her stage name of Red Wing. Born on the Winnebago Reservation near Omaha, she was a citizen of the Winnebago Tribe of Nebraska through her parents Mitchell St. Cyr and Julia Decora. St. Cyr was best known for her lead role in 1914's The Squaw Man.

== Career ==
Young Deer began acting in 1909 in New York City in several one-reel Westerns that year. Among the film companies for which he worked were Kalem, Lubin, Vitagraph, and Biograph. He worked at one of the first independent film companies, the New York Motion Picture Company, under the Bison trademark.

In 1910, Young Deer was hired to direct for Pathé Frères. The French-based studio in Jersey City was faced with criticism that their movies were not realistic in their portrayals of the Old West. They sent Young Deer to Edendale in Los Angeles to make Indian-themed films. His wife Red Wing acted in many of his films. Young Deer eventually ran the company's West Coast Studio operations in Edendale.

Young Deer acted in, wrote, or directed approximately 150 silent movies at Pathé's West Coast Studio.

== Influence of work ==
By 1910, one-fifth of American films were Westerns, and companies worked to establish national dominance in the genre. In these early years, American Indians were "generally portrayed in a positive way," and directors often hired Native Americans as actors. Movie historian William K. Everson wrote, "[D]uring this period the Indian became accepted as a symbol of integrity, stoicism, and reliability ..."

Young Deer's films have been noted as early Westerns "without the cliches of hostile Indian warriors or wagon train attacks." although Several studios at the time, especially Kalem, also portrayed Indians in a unique and favorable light compared with later works. The combined talent of Young Deer and St. Cyr was due to several factors. She was educated at the Carlisle Indian School and had some knowledge of Winnebago and general elements of Indian culture. During the early 1900s, the film industry was adaptable and experimental.

== Later years ==
Young Deer encountered legal troubles in California in 1913, when a 15-year-old girl alleged he assaulted her. Young Deer went overseas, working first in Great Britain. In 1914 he worked in London, shooting thrillers for British and Colonial Films that included The Queen of the London Counterfeiters and The Black Cross Gang. A few writers have said that during World War I, he created documentaries in France. This assertion has not been substantiated.

After Young Deer returned from Great Britain in 1914, he had a hard time finding work, as Westerns were less popular for a time. He was said to operate an acting school in San Francisco. In the 1930s, after talkies came to dominate film, he worked occasionally as a second-unit director on independently produced low-budget B movies and serials.

In July 1930, he traveled to Arizona to marry Helen Gilchrist. She died in 1937. Young Deer died in New York City on April 6, 1946. He received a military burial at the Long Island National Cemetery as James Young Johnson, veteran of the Spanish–American War.

Many of his early films are now lost. However, in 2008 the Library of Congress added White Fawn's Devotion, one of Young Deer's few surviving pictures, to its National Film Registry.

One of his later films, Tragedies of the Osage Hills (1926), was the first feature about the Osage murders, which had been reported in national media. Whites were killing Osage people in efforts to get control of their headrights to oil riches. Tragedies of the Osage Hills is presumably a lost film. His film preceded Martin Scorsese's Killers of the Flower Moon (2023) by about a century.

== Films ==
=== Director ===
- Lieutenant Daring RN and the Water Rats (1924)
- The Stranger (1920/I) (as James Youngdeer)
- Who Laughs Last (1920)
- The Savage (1913)
- The Unwilling Bride (1912)
- The Squaw Man's Sweetheart (1912)
- Red Deer's Devotion (1911)
- The Yaqui Girl (1910)
- Cowboy Justice (1910)
- An Indian's Gratitude (1910)
- A Cheyenne Brave (1910)
- The Red Girl and the Child (1910)
- Under Both Flags (1910)
- White Fawn's Devotion: A Play Acted by a Tribe of Red Indians in America (1910) (uncredited)
- Red Wing's Gratitude (1909)
- For Her Sale; or, Two Sailors and a Girl (1909)
- The Falling Arrow (1909)

=== Actor ===
- The Man of Courage (1922) .... Aquila
- Under Handicap (1917) (as James Youngdeer) .... Lonesome Pete
- Against Heavy Odds (1914)
- The Unwilling Bride (1912)
- Little Dove's Romance (1911)
- Red Deer's Devotion (1911)
- Young Deer's Return (1910) .... Young Deer
- The Red Girl and the Child (1910)
- The Indian and the Cowgirl (1910)
- The Cowboy and the Schoolmarm (1910)
- Young Deer's Gratitude (1910) .... Young Deer
- The Ten of Spades; or, A Western Raffle (1910)
- Young Deer's Bravery (1909) .... Young Deer
- Red Wing's Gratitude (1909)
- The Mended Lute (1909) .... Indian
- The True Heart of an Indian (1909) ... aka A True Indian's Heart (USA)

=== Writer ===
- Lieutenant Daring RN and the Water Rats (1924) (writer)
- Neck and Noose (1919) (story) (as Jim Youngdeer)
- White Fawn's Devotion: A Play Acted by a Tribe of Red Indians in America (1910) (uncredited)
