= The Squaw Man (1914 film) =

1914 silent film by Cecil B. DeMille & Oscar C. Apfel

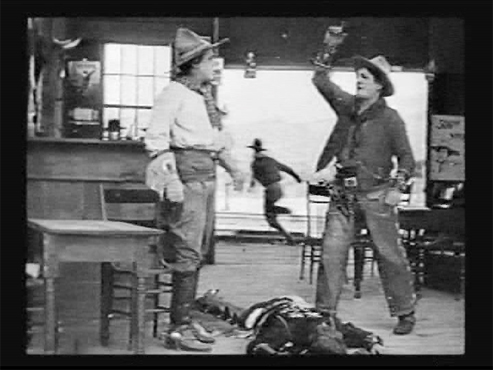
- A scene from The Squaw Man
- Directed by: Cecil B. DeMille; Oscar C. Apfel
- Screenplay by: Cecil B. DeMille; Oscar C. Apfel
- Based on: The Squaw Man; 1905 play by Edwin Milton Royle
- Produced by: Cecil B. DeMille; Oscar C. Apfel; Jesse L. Lasky
- Starring: Dustin Farnum
- Cinematography: Alfredo Gandolfi
- Edited by: Mamie Wagner
- Production company: Jesse L. Lasky Feature Play Company
- Distributed by: State Rights
- Release date: February 12, 1914 (United States)
- Running time: 74 minutes
- Country: United States
- Languages: Silent; English intertitles
- Budget: $40,000
- Box office: $533,446

The Squaw Man (known as The White Man in the United Kingdom) is a 1914 American silent Western film directed by Cecil B. DeMille and Oscar C. Apfel, and starring Dustin Farnum. It was DeMille's directorial debut and the first feature-length film to be shot in what is now Hollywood.

== Plot ==
The Squaw Man (1914)

James Wynnegate and his cousin, Henry, are upper-class Englishmen and trustees for an orphans' fund. Henry loses money in a bet at a derby and embezzles money from "the fund" to pay off his debts. When war office officials are informed of the money missing they pursue James, but he successfully escapes to Wyoming.

There, James rescues Nat-U-Ritch, daughter of the chief of the Ute tribe, from local outlaw Cash Hawkins. Hawkins plans to exact his revenge on James, but has his plans thwarted by Nat-U-Ritch, who shoots him dead. Later, James has an accident in the mountains and needs to be rescued. Nat-U-Ritch discovers him and carries him back to safety. As she nurses him back to health, they fall in love and later have a child.

Meanwhile, during an exploration of the Alps, Henry falls off a cliff. Before he succumbs to his injuries, Henry signs a letter of confession proclaiming James's innocence in the embezzlement. Before Henry's widow, Lady Diana and others arrive in Wyoming to tell James the news, the Sheriff recovers the murder weapon that was used against Cash Hawkins in James and Nat-U-Ritch's home. Realizing that their son is not safe, the couple sends him away, leaving them both distraught. Facing the possibilities of losing both her son and her freedom, Nat-U-Ritch commits suicide. The movie ends with both the Ute chief and James embracing her body.

== Cast ==
- Dustin Farnum as Capt. James Wynnegate aka Jim Carston
- Monroe Salisbury as Sir Henry, Earl of Kerhill
- Lillian St. Cyr as Nat-u-Ritch
- Winifred Kingston as Lady Diana, Countess of Kerhill
- 'Baby' Carmen De Rue as Hal
- Joseph Singleton as Tab-y-wana
- William Elmer as Cash Hawkins
- Mrs. A.W. Filson as The Dowager Lady Elizabeth Kerhill
- Haidee Fuller as Lady Mabel Wynnegate
- Foster Knox as Sir John
- Dick La Reno as Big Bill
- Richard L'Estrange as Grouchy
- Fred Montague as Mr. Petrie
- Cecil B. DeMille as Faro Dealer
- Cecilia de Mille as Child
- Hal Roach as Townsman
- Art Acord as Townsman
- Raymond Hatton in a bit part

== Production background ==
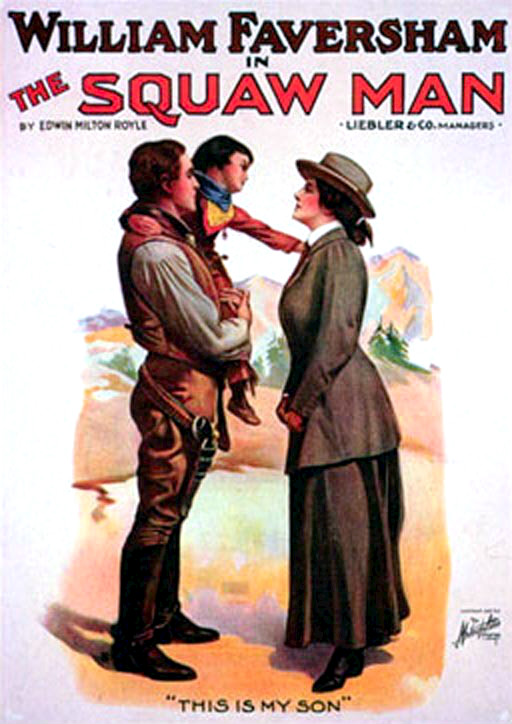
The Squaw Man. 1905 Broadway play.

The only onscreen filmmaking credit is "Picturized by Cecil B. DeMille and Oscar C. Apfel." The film was adapted by DeMille and Apfel from the 1905 stage play of the same name by Edwin Milton Royle, and produced by DeMille, Apfel, and Jesse L. Lasky for the Jesse L. Lasky Feature Play Company, its first film.

This first screen version of the story was the legendary DeMille's first movie assignment. It was also the first feature-length film shot in California, partly in what became Hollywood. Film historians agree that shorts had previously been filmed in Hollywood, with D. W. Griffith's In Old California (1910) considered the earliest. DeMille rented what is now known as the Lasky-DeMille Barn at the southeast corner of Selma and Vine Streets to serve as their studio and production office; today it is home to the Hollywood Heritage Museum. Shooting on The Squaw Man began December 29, 1913, and finished January 20, 1914.

DeMille wanted to emphasize the outdoors and wanted to shoot the movie in exotic scenery and great vistas. Initially he traveled to Flagstaff, Arizona to film the movie. After seeing the vast amount of mountains near Flagstaff, the production was moved to Los Angeles. Harbor scenes were shot in San Pedro, California and the western saloon set was built beside railroad tracks in the San Fernando Valley. Footage of cattle on the open range was shot at Keen Camp near Idyllwild, California, while snow scenes were shot at Mount Palomar. Cecil B. DeMille felt that lighting in a movie was extremely important and viewed it as the visual and emotional foundation to build his image. He believed that lighting was to a film as "music is to an opera".

The Squaw Man went on to become the only movie successfully filmed three times by the same director/producer, DeMille. He filmed a silent remake in 1918, and a talkie version in 1931. The Squaw Man was 74 minutes long and generated $244,700 in profit.

== Characters ==
The main character James Wynnegate played by Dustin Farnum, was cast as the hero for the film. Farnum was a notable Broadway star and his wife in real life Winifred Kingston was also a well-known actress. She played the English love interest. Red Wing (real name Lillian St. Cyr) was born into the Winnebago Tribe of Nebraska on the Winnebago Reservation, and she played the American Indian wife.

== Representation of Native Americans ==
Non-Native American actor Joseph Singleton played the role of Tabywana, Nat-U-Ritch's father. Lillian St. Cyr of the Winnebago Tribe of Nebraska was cast to play the role of Nat-U-Ritch, a member of the Ute tribe. She is also known as "Princess Redwing". St. Cyr along with her husband James Young Deer (of the Nanticoke people of Delaware) have been regarded as one of the first "Native American power couples" in Hollywood, along with Mona Darkfeather and her husband, director Frank E. Montgomery. DeMille had selected Lillian St. Cyr, but his first choice had been Darkfeather, who was not available.

During the early silent film era, films based on Native Americans were popular. The central theme of this film was miscegenation. In the state of California, anti-miscegenation laws existed until 1948; however, while African-Americans couldn't legally marry whites in California during filming, marriages between Native Americans and whites were permitted. Though there were Native American actors, most Native characters were played by whites.

During the early teens, Young Deer and Lillian St. Cyr helped to transform how Native American characters were represented. The characters they created were sympathetic in complex ways, although other studios such as Kalem Company were also attempting to accurately portray Natives in film. However, other scholars argue that Native American–themed silent films did not alter in any way the dominant perception of Natives themselves. Many films displayed the Native American experience from many different perspectives and did involve Native American writers, filmmakers, and actors during this time period.

== Censorship ==
The Chicago Board of Censors removed the scene of the detective being tied up, and shortened the scenes of the dead man and the man falling from the rocks.

== See also ==
- The House That Shadows Built (1931 promotional film by Paramount)
