= Inventing the Indian =

- Directed by: Chris Cottam
- Starring: Rich Hall; Dallas Goldtooth
- Country of origin: United Kingdom
- Original language: English

Production
- Producer: John McCormack
- Running time: 1:30:00
- Production company: BBC

Original release
- Network: BBC 4
- Release: 2012

Inventing the Indian is a 2012 BBC documentary first broadcast on 28 October on BBC 4, exploring the stereotypical view of Native Americans in the United States in cinema and literature.

Presented by Rich Hall and Dallas Goldtooth, a Native American, it uncovers myths about the American Indian and how they live currently. Hall looks at films including Soldier Blue, Stagecoach and A Man Called Horse, and books including The Last of the Mohicans, Black Elk Speaks and Bury My Heart at Wounded Knee. It also covered Geronimo and Sitting Bull.

== Reception ==
Hall tore into the way that white people, such as Kevin Costner, insisted on becoming spokespeople for the pain of Native Americans. As the impassioned and conspicuously white Hall repeated the same sin, Dallas Goldtooth, an activist-comedian from the Dakota tribe, shook his head with mock disapproval. The unstated part of the joke was that Hall is said to be part Cherokee.

== See also ==
- Imagining Indians (1992)
- Reel Injun (2009)
