= Red Wing (actress) =

American actress

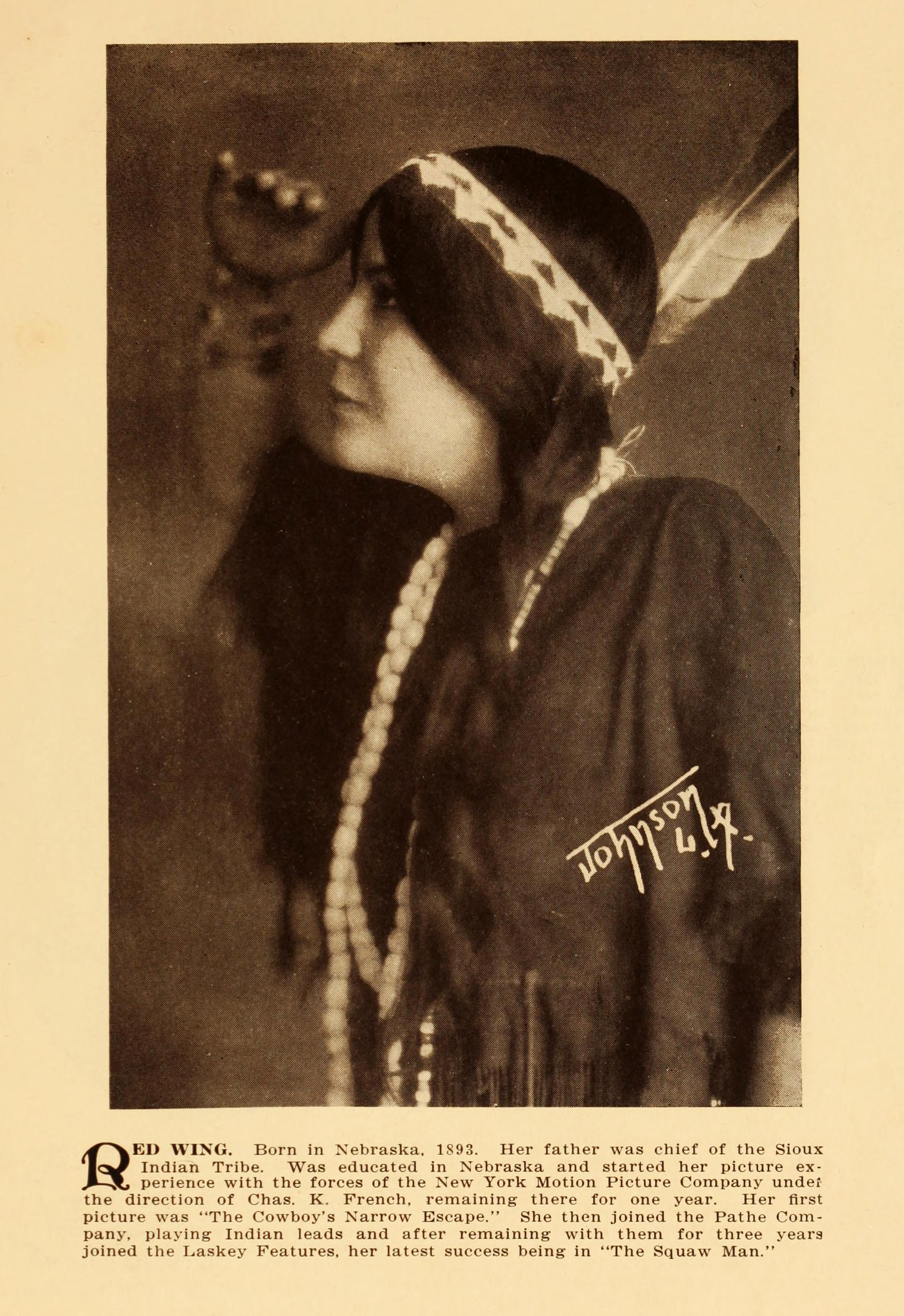
- Who's Who in the Film World (1914)
- Born: Lilian Margaret St. Cyr; February 23, 1884; Winnebago Reservation, Nebraska, United States
- Died: March 12, 1974 (aged 90); New York City, New York
- Occupation: Actress
- Years active: 1908 – 1921
- Spouses: James Young Deer (m. 1906) Joe Eaglefoot (m. 1925–1929)

Red Wing (born Lilian Margaret St. Cyr; February 23, 1884 – March 12, 1974, Winnebago/Ho-Chunk) was an American actress of the silent era. She and her husband James Young Deer (Nanticoke) have been dubbed by some as one of the first Native American Hollywood "power couple(s)", along with Mona Darkfeather and her actor/director husband Frank E. Montgomery. St. Cyr was born on the Winnebago Reservation in Nebraska.

== Early life ==
As a child, Lilian was raised Roman Catholic; her first language was a Siouan language. She was sent East to attend the Carlisle Indian Industrial School in Pennsylvania between 1894 and 1902. It enrolled students as boarders from a variety of Native American tribes in an effort to assimilate them to American mainstream life, requiring them to speak English, wear mainstream style clothes, and observe Christianity.

She moved to Washington, D.C. to work as a domestic servant for Kansas Senator Chester I. Long and his wife. There she met and married James Younger Johnson, nicknamed James Young Deer, on April 9, 1906. Young Deer was a member of the Nanticoke tribe. According to St. Cyr, of mixed Delaware Indian (Lenape), European, and African-American ancestry. (A native of Washington, D.C., Young Deer served in the US Navy during the Spanish–American War.

== Personal life and early roles ==
After they married, the couple performed a Western act in various venues around New York City and Philadelphia. In 1908, St. Cyr appeared in the Kalem Company's The White Squaw. That was followed in May 1909 by Lubin's The Falling Arrow. In the summer of 1909 the couple worked as technical advisers and extras for the films The Mended Lute and Indian Runner's Romance, both directed by D. W. Griffith.

St. Cyr also appeared in the Vitagraph Studios' Red Wing's Gratitude that fall as the character "Princess Red Wing", which she adopted as a stage name. Concurrently, they worked for Bison films (New York Motion Picture Company), which relocated from New York City to Edendale in the fall of 1909.

== Film ==
St. Cyr is best known for her feature role in The Squaw Man (1914) by producer/director Cecil B. DeMille and co-director Oscar Apfel. The movie starred Dustin Farnum and Monroe Salisbury. DeMille's first choice had been Mona Darkfeather, but she was already under contract with the Kalem Company and had to turn down the offer. St. Cyr was the second Native American woman to appear in a film. Jesse Cornplanter had the lead in the feature film Hiawatha, released in 1913, a year before The Squaw Man.

After the movie with DeMille, St. Cyr had a role with cowboy star Tom Mix in the Western In the Days of the Thundering Herd (1914) and another in Fighting Bob (1915). She was featured in a small role in the 1916 version of Ramona, about Native Americans and Spanish colonists in early California. She played the girl's mother.

From 1908 to 1921, St. Cyr performed in more than 35 short Western films. She retired from acting in the 1920s and returned to New York City to settle. She was buried in the Roman Catholic St. Augustine Cemetery in Thurston County, Nebraska, near the Winnebago Reservation.

== Popular culture ==
"Red Wing", a popular song of 1907 by Kerry Mills and Thurland Chattaway, was said to have been performed by St. Cyr and was associated with her. However, film historians question this.
