= 2028 Los Angeles County Executive election =

- November 7, 2028

The 2028 Los Angeles County Executive election is scheduled to be held on November 7, 2028 in Los Angeles, California, with a nonpartisan primary to be held on March 7, 2028. The County Executive is a new position created following the passage of Measure G in 2024. The election will take place alongside other elections for District Attorney and Board of Supervisors.

== Background ==
Los Angeles County is currently governed by a five-member Board of Supervisors, which has appointed a Chief Administrative Officer since 1938 (renamed Chief Executive Officer since 2007). In addition, the Chair of Los Angeles County, the presiding officer over the Board of Supervisors, serves de facto as the executive leader of the county government.

In 2024, voters approved Measure G, which made major changes to the county charter. These changes included increasing the size of the Board of Supervisors to nine members, establishing an ethics commission, and creating the position of County Executive.

The Los Angeles County Executive will be the second directly-elected executive of a county government in California after the Mayor of San Francisco, who has held the leadership of San Francisco County since consolidation in 1856. In addition, the County Executive will become the directly-elected executive of the most populous county-level government in the United States. Finally, the County Executive will become the fourth county-wide elected official in Los Angeles County, alongside the Sheriff, the District Attorney and the County Assessor.

== Candidates ==
=== Declared ===
- Lindsey Horvath, county supervisor from the 3rd district (2022–present) and mayor of West Hollywood (2020–2021)

=== Potential ===
- Rick Caruso, founder of Caruso and runner-up for mayor of Los Angeles in 2022
- Janice Hahn, county supervisor from the 4th district (2016–present) and member of the United States House of Representatives from the 44th district (2013–2016) and the 36th district (2011–2013)
- Monica Rodriguez, member of the Los Angeles City Council from the 7th district (2017–present)
- Miguel Santana, president of the California Community Foundation
