= 2028 Los Angeles County elections =

- November 7, 2028

The 2028 Los Angeles County elections are scheduled to be held on November 7, 2028, in Los Angeles County, California, with nonpartisan primary elections for certain offices being held on June 6. Three of the five seats of the Board of Supervisors are up for election, as well as two of the countywide elected officials, the District Attorney and the County Executive. In addition, elections will be held for the Superior Court.

== County Executive ==
Following the approval of Measure G by county voters in 2024, there will be a new office of County Executive to be elected for the first time in 2028. The new County Executive will be elected countywide to a four-year term, and will assume the role of elected leader of the county government from the Chair of the Board of Supervisors.

The Los Angeles County Executive will be the second directly-elected executive of a county government in California after the Mayor of San Francisco, who has held the leadership of San Francisco County since consolidation in 1856. In addition, the County Executive will become the directly-elected executive of the most populous county-level government in the United States. Finally, the County Executive will become the fourth county-wide elected official in Los Angeles County, alongside the Sheriff, the District Attorney and the County Assessor.

== Board of Supervisors ==
Three of the five seats of the Los Angeles County Board of Supervisors will be up for election to four-year terms. Incumbent supervisor Holly Mitchell will be eligible for re-election for a third, final term. Janice Hahn and Kathryn Barger will be term-limited. Following the approval of Measure G by county voters in 2024, the 2028 election for the Board of Supervisors will be the final election held for Districts 2, 4 and 5, as well as the penultimate elections for the Board, under the map approved by the Board in 2022 following the 2020 census.

== District Attorney ==
Incumbent district attorney Nathan Hochman will be eligible for re-election to a four-year term.

== See also ==
- Government of Los Angeles County
- 2028 California elections
