= 2020 Los Angeles County Board of Supervisors election =

- March 3, 2020; November 3, 2020

3 of the 5 seats of the Los Angeles County Board of Supervisors
	Majority party	Minority party
Party	Democratic	Republican
Seats before	4	1
Seats won	2	1
Seats after	4	1
Seat change	Steady	Steady
- Results of the elections: Democratic hold Republican hold No election

The 2020 Los Angeles County Board of Supervisors elections took place on March 3, 2020, with runoff elections held on November 3, 2020, to elect members of the Los Angeles County Board of Supervisors. Three of the five seats on the board were up for election.

With the election of Holly Mitchell in the second district, the board of supervisors consisted entirely of women for the first time in history.

Municipal elections in California are officially nonpartisan. The candidates' party affiliations do not appear on the ballot.

== District 2 ==
2020 Los Angeles County Board of Supervisors election District 2

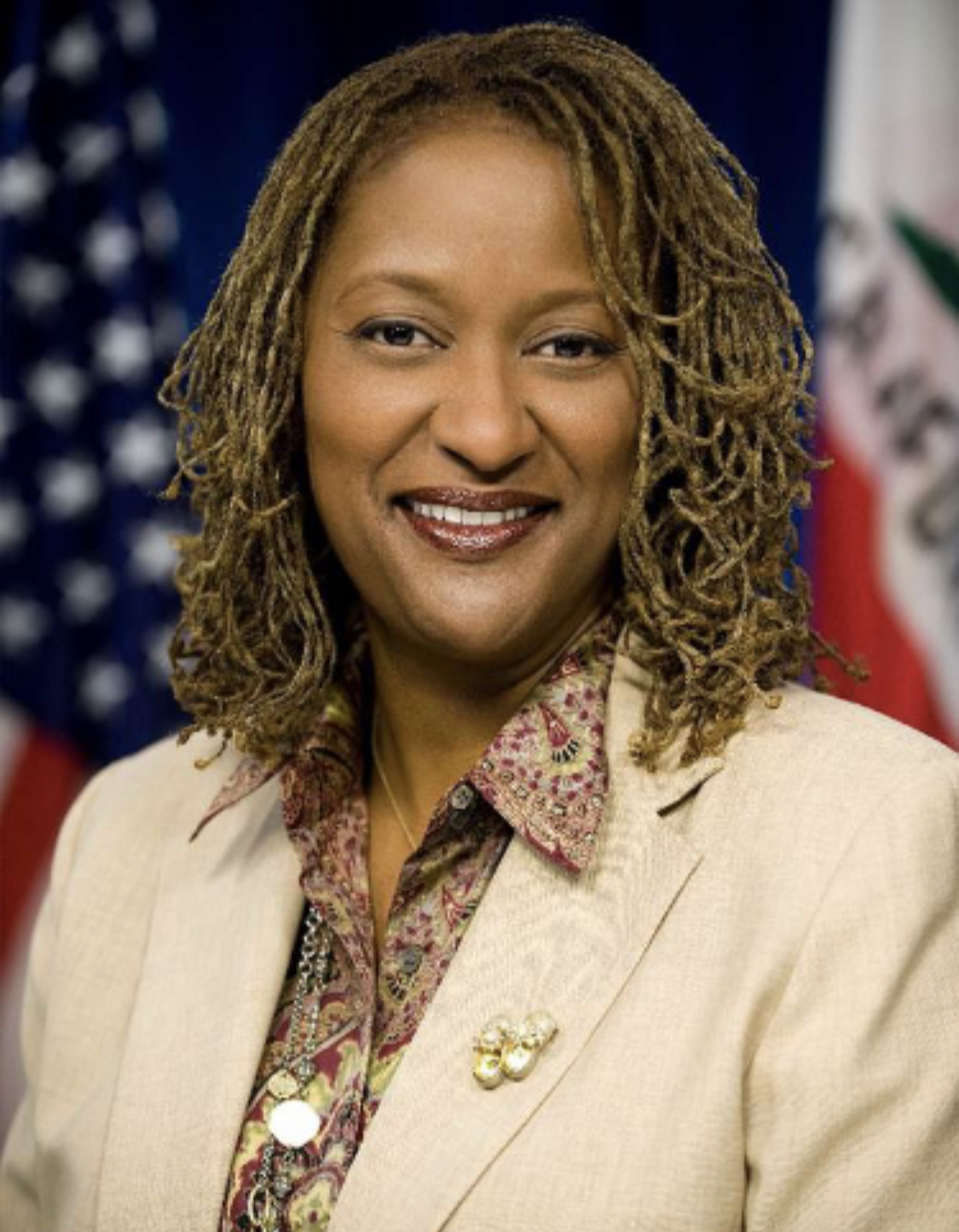

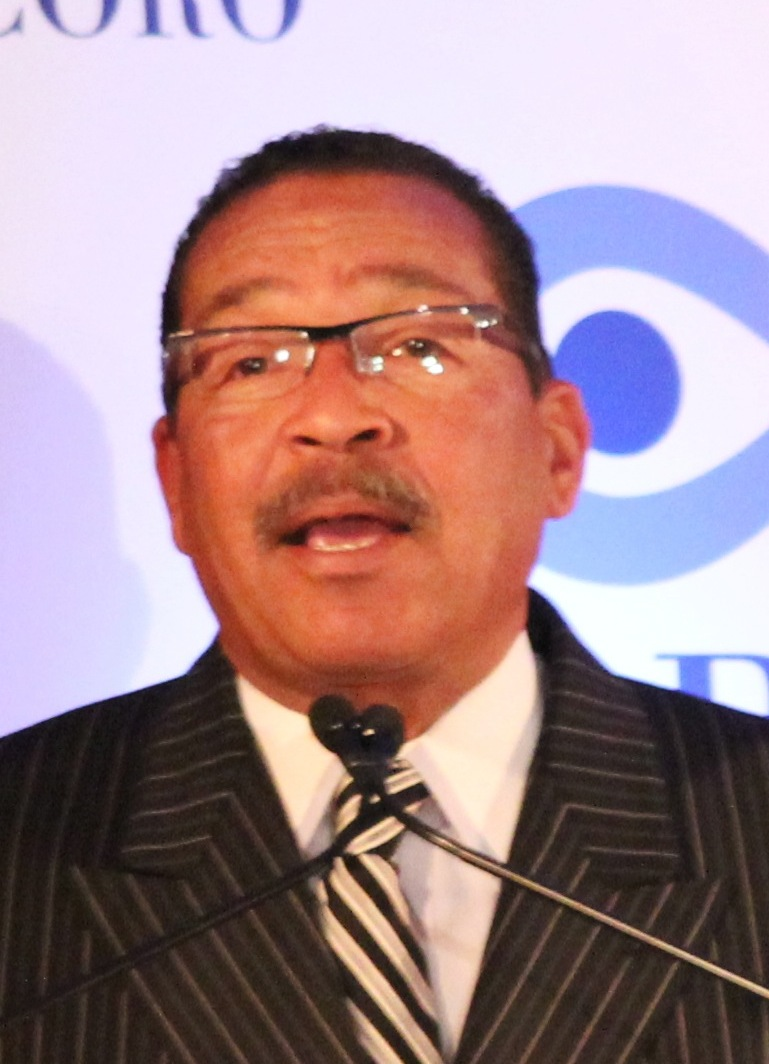

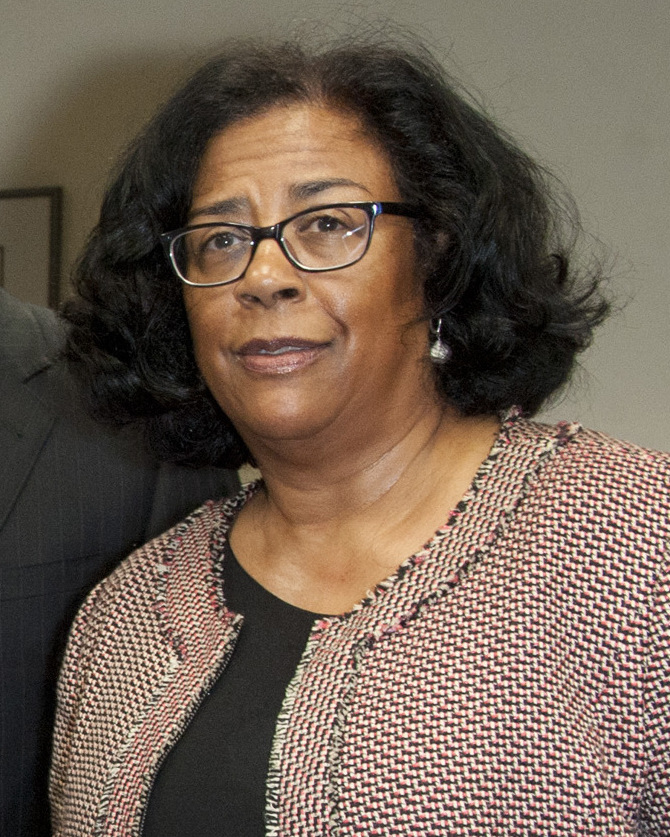

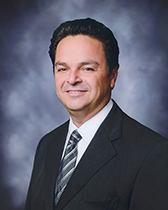
Candidate	Holly Mitchell	Herb Wesson	Jan Perry
First round	87,914; 29.0%	90,597; 29.9%	36,099; 11.9%
Runoff	387,930; 60.6%	252,545; 39.4%	Eliminated
Candidate	Albert Robles	Jorge Nuno	Jake Jeong
First round	32,305; 10.7%	19,850; 6.6%	19,511; 6.5%
Runoff	Eliminated	Eliminated	Eliminated
Candidate	Rene Rigard
First round	16,452; 5.4%
Runoff	Eliminated
Supervisor before election
Mark Ridley-Thomas
Supervisor
Holly Mitchell

The second supervisorial district is the smallest of the five, comprising mostly parts of the South Los Angeles and South Bay areas. It contains the cities of Inglewood, Compton, Carson, and Hawthorne. Incumbent supervisor Mark Ridley-Thomas was term-limited and could not seek re-election.

=== Candidates ===
==== Advanced to runoff ====
- Holly Mitchell (Democratic), state senator and former state assemblywoman
- Herb Wesson (Democratic), Los Angeles city councilor and former state assemblyman

==== Eliminated in primary ====
- Jake Jeong, attorney
- Jorge Nuno, candidate for Los Angeles City Council in 2017
- Jan Perry (Democratic), former Los Angeles city councilor
- Rene Rigard
- Albert Robles (Democratic), mayor of Carson

=== Results ===
2020 Second supervisorial district election
Primary election
Candidate	Votes	%
Herb Wesson	90,597	29.93
Holly Mitchell	87,914	29.04
Jan Perry	36,099	11.92
Albert Robles	32,305	10.67
Jorge Nuno	19,850	6.56
Jake Jeong	19,511	6.45
Rene Rigard	16,452	5.43
Total votes	302,728	100.00
General election
Holly Mitchell	387,930	60.57
Herb Wesson	252,545	39.43
Total votes	640,475	100.00

== District 4 ==
2020 Los Angeles County Board of Supervisors election District 4

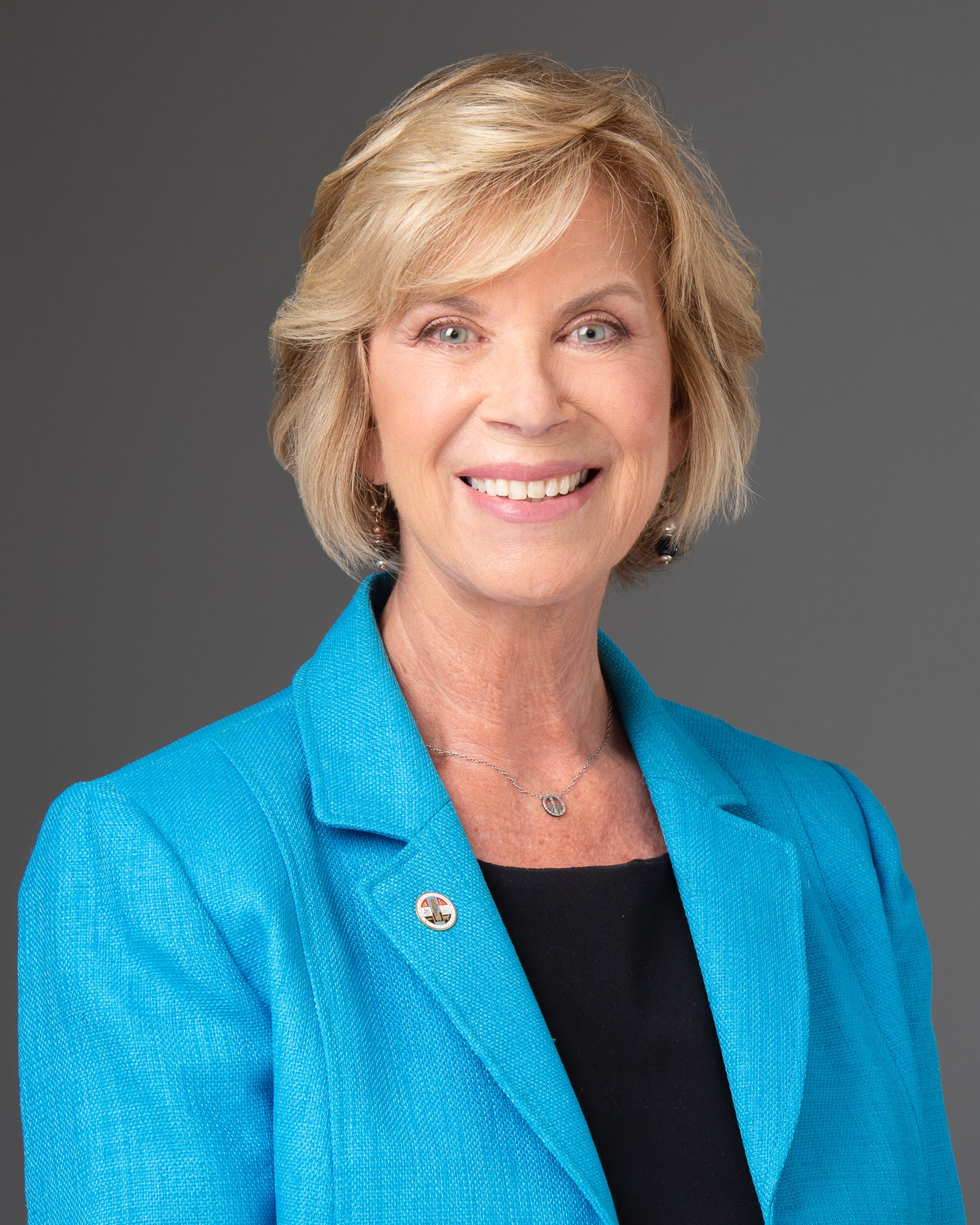

Candidate	Janice Hahn	Desiree Washington
Popular vote	291,618	91,352
Percentage	76.2%	23.9%
Supervisor before election
Janice Hahn
Supervisor
Janice Hahn

The fourth supervisorial district contains most of the South Bay and Gateway Cities areas, as well as parts of the Harbor Region and San Gabriel Valley. It includes the cities of Long Beach, Torrance, Downey, Norwalk, Whittier, and Lakewood. Incumbent supervisor Janice Hahn was first elected in 2016 with 56.3% of the vote.

=== Candidates ===
- Janice Hahn (Democratic), incumbent supervisor
- Desiree Washington

=== Results ===
2020 Fourth supervisorial district election
Primary election
Candidate	Votes	%
Janice Hahn (incumbent)	291,618	76.15
Desiree Washington	91,352	23.85
Total votes	382,970	100.00

== District 5 ==
2020 Los Angeles County Board of Supervisors election District 5

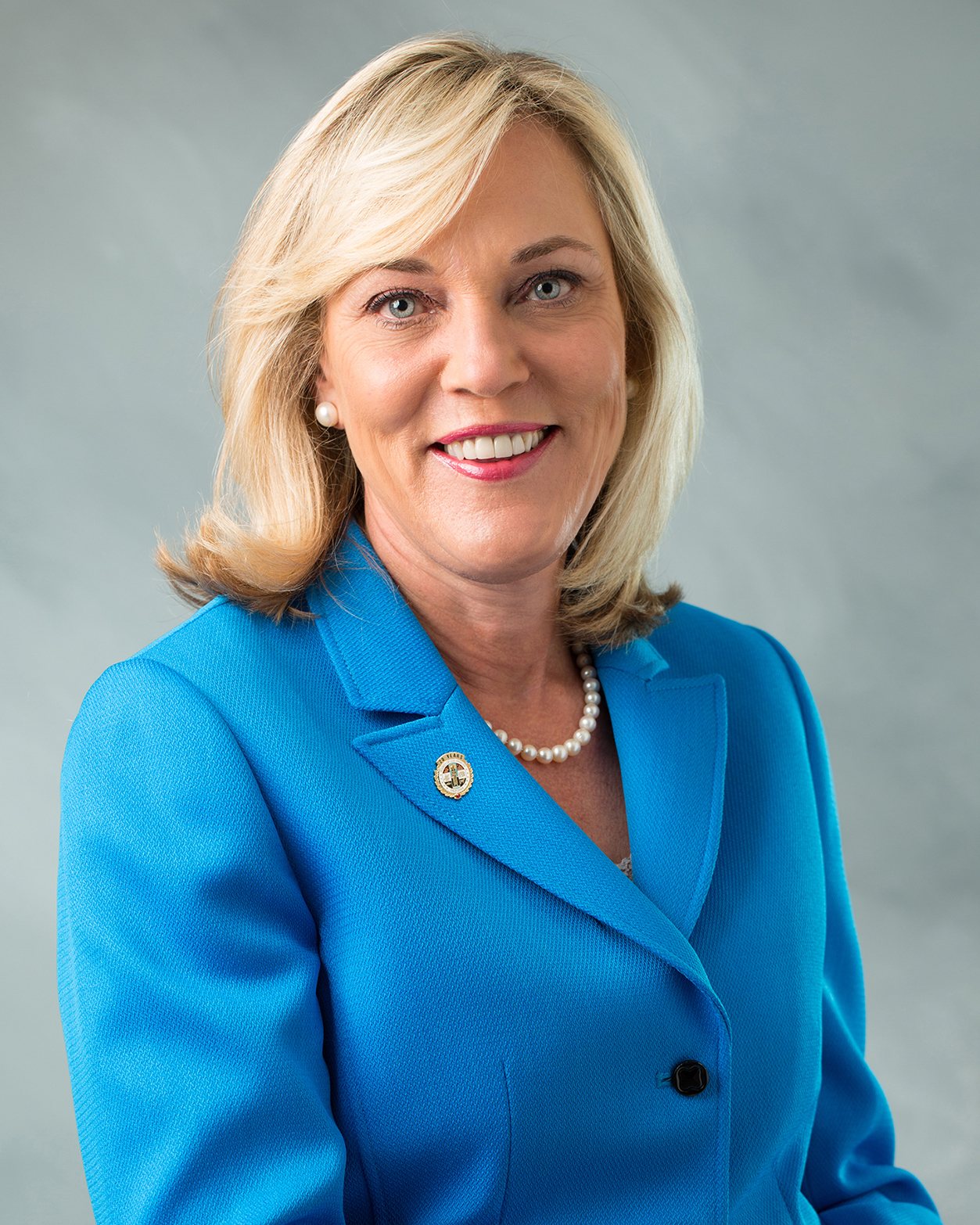

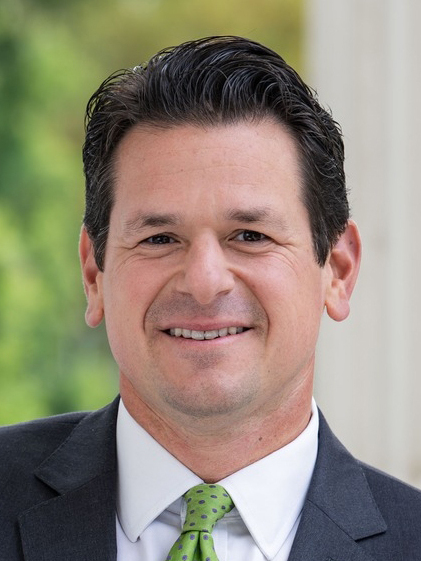
Candidate	Kathryn Barger	Darrell Park	John Harabedian
Popular vote	240,403	84,611	84,199
Percentage	58.8%	20.7%	20.6%
Supervisor before election
Kathryn Barger
Supervisor
Kathryn Barger

The fifth supervisorial district is the largest of the five, covering the entire northern half of the county including the Verdugo Mountains, the San Gabriel Mountains, the Antelope Valley, and portions of the San Gabriel Valley. It includes the cities of Santa Clarita, Glendale, Lancaster, Palmdale, Pasadena, Burbank, and Alhambra. Incumbent supervisor Kathryn Barger was first elected in a runoff election in 2016 with 57.9% of the vote.

=== Candidates ===
- Kathryn Barger (Republican), incumbent supervisor
- John Harabedian
- Darrell Park (Democratic), community activist and candidate for this district in 2016

=== Results ===
2020 Fifth supervisorial district election
Primary election
Candidate	Votes	%
Kathryn Barger (incumbent)	240,403	58.75
Darrell Park	84,611	20.68
John Harabedian	84,199	20.58
Total votes	409,213	100.00
