= 2024 Los Angeles County Board of Supervisors election =

2024 Los Angeles County Board of Supervisors elections
- March 5, 2024

2 out of 5 seats of the Los Angeles County Board of Supervisors 3 seats needed for a majority
	Majority party	Minority party
Party	Democratic	Republican
Seats before	4	1
Seats won	2	1
Seats after	4	1
Seat change	Steady	Steady

The 2024 Los Angeles County Board of Supervisors elections took place on March 5, 2024, to elect members of the Los Angeles County Board of Supervisors. Three of the five seats on the board were up for election to four-year terms. Municipal elections in California are officially nonpartisan; candidates' party affiliations do not appear on the ballot.

Incumbent supervisors Kathryn Barger, Janice Hahn, and Holly Mitchell all won re-election outright, negating the need for a runoff. This was the first supervisorial election cycle without a second round of voting since 2018.

== District 2 ==
2024 Second supervisorial district election
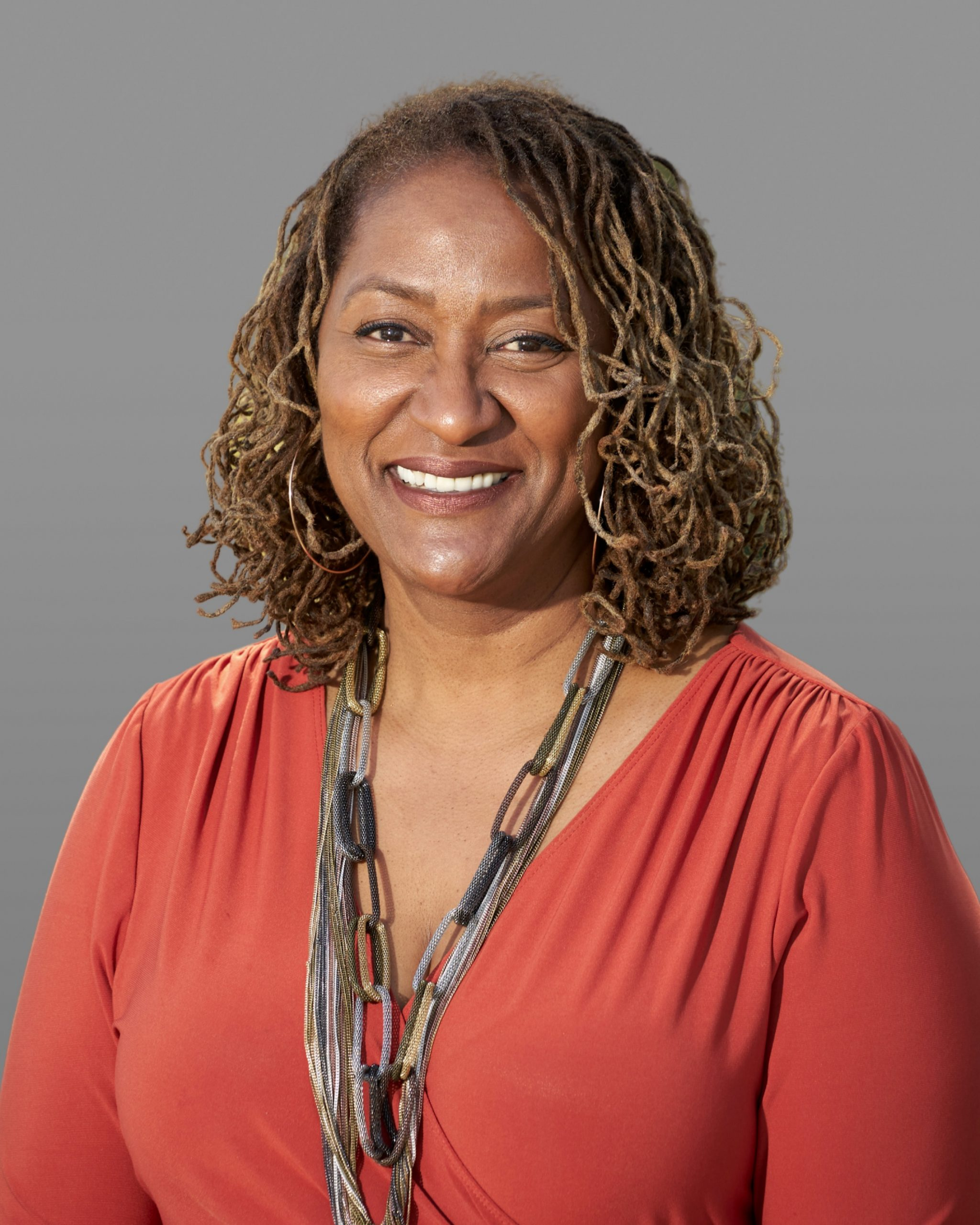

Candidate	Holly Mitchell	Daphne Bradford
Popular vote	158,173	30,516
Percentage	68.45%	13.21%
Candidate	Clint Carlton	Katrina Williams
Popular vote	26,183	16,222
Percentage	11.33%	7.02%
County supervisor before election
Holly Mitchell
County supervisor
Holly Mitchell

The second supervisorial comprises the cities of Carson, Compton, Culver City, El Segundo, Gardena, Hermosa Beach, Inglewood, Lawndale, Manhattan Beach, and Redondo Beach; the communities of Alondra Park, Del Aire, East Compton, East Gardena, Florence-Graham, Ladera Heights, Lennox, Marina Del Ray, West Athens, West Carson, Westmont, and Willowbrook; as well as the neighborhoods of Westchester and Harbor City north to Koreatown. Incumbent supervisor Holly Mitchell was first elected in a runoff with 60.6% of the vote in 2020.

=== Candidates ===
- Daphne Bradford, teacher
- Clint Carlton, nonprofit executive
- Holly Mitchell, incumbent supervisor
- Katrina Williams, businesswoman

=== Endorsements ===
Clint Carlton

Individuals

- Dwayne Johnson, actor
Holly Mitchell

Political parties

- Los Angeles County Democratic Party
- Working Families Party

Organizations

- Stonewall Democrats

=== Results ===
2024 Second supervisorial district election
Primary election
Candidate	Votes	%
Holly Mitchell (incumbent)	158,173	68.45
Daphne Bradford	30,516	13.21
Clint Carlton	26,183	11.33
Katrina Williams	16,222	7.02
Total votes	231,094	100.00

== District 4 ==
2024 Fourth supervisorial district election
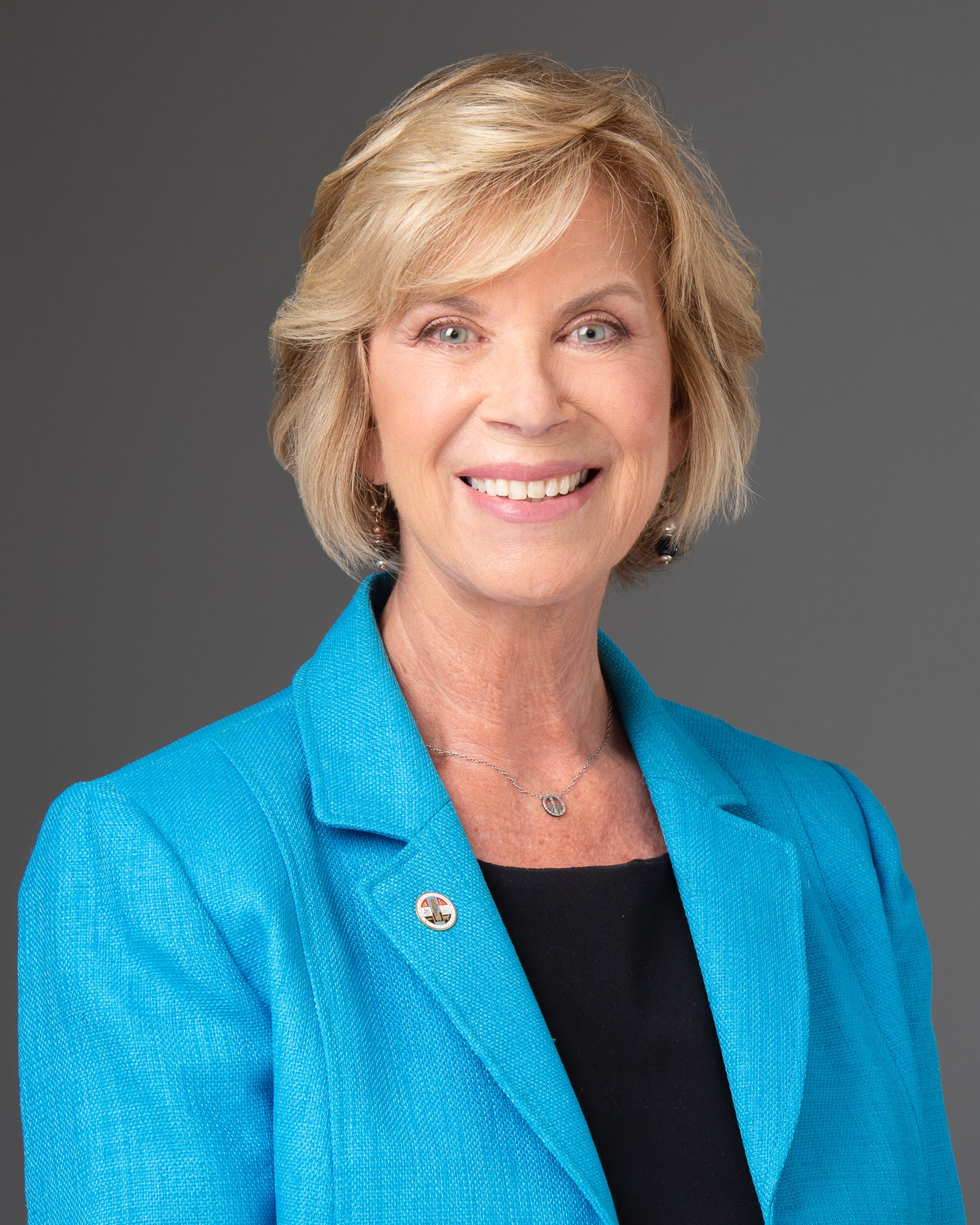

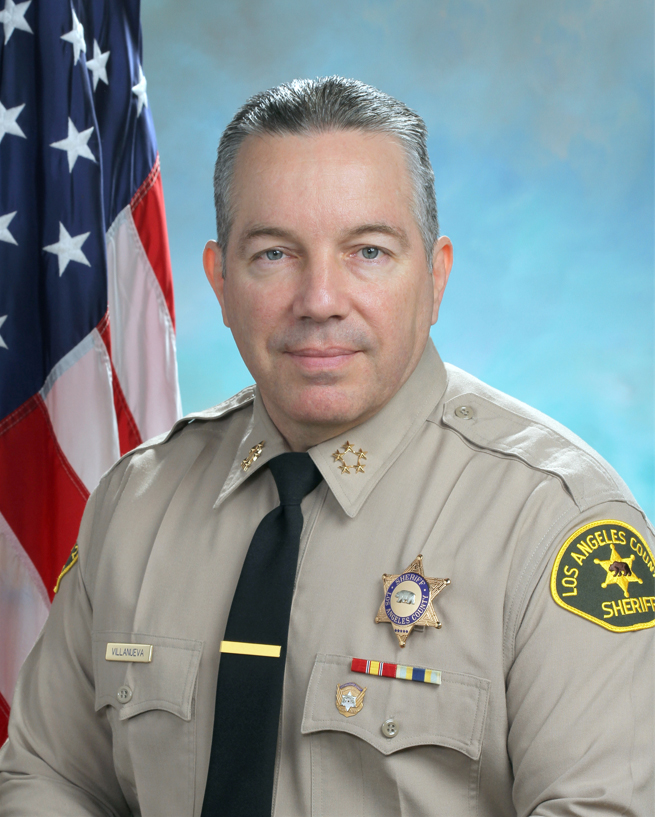

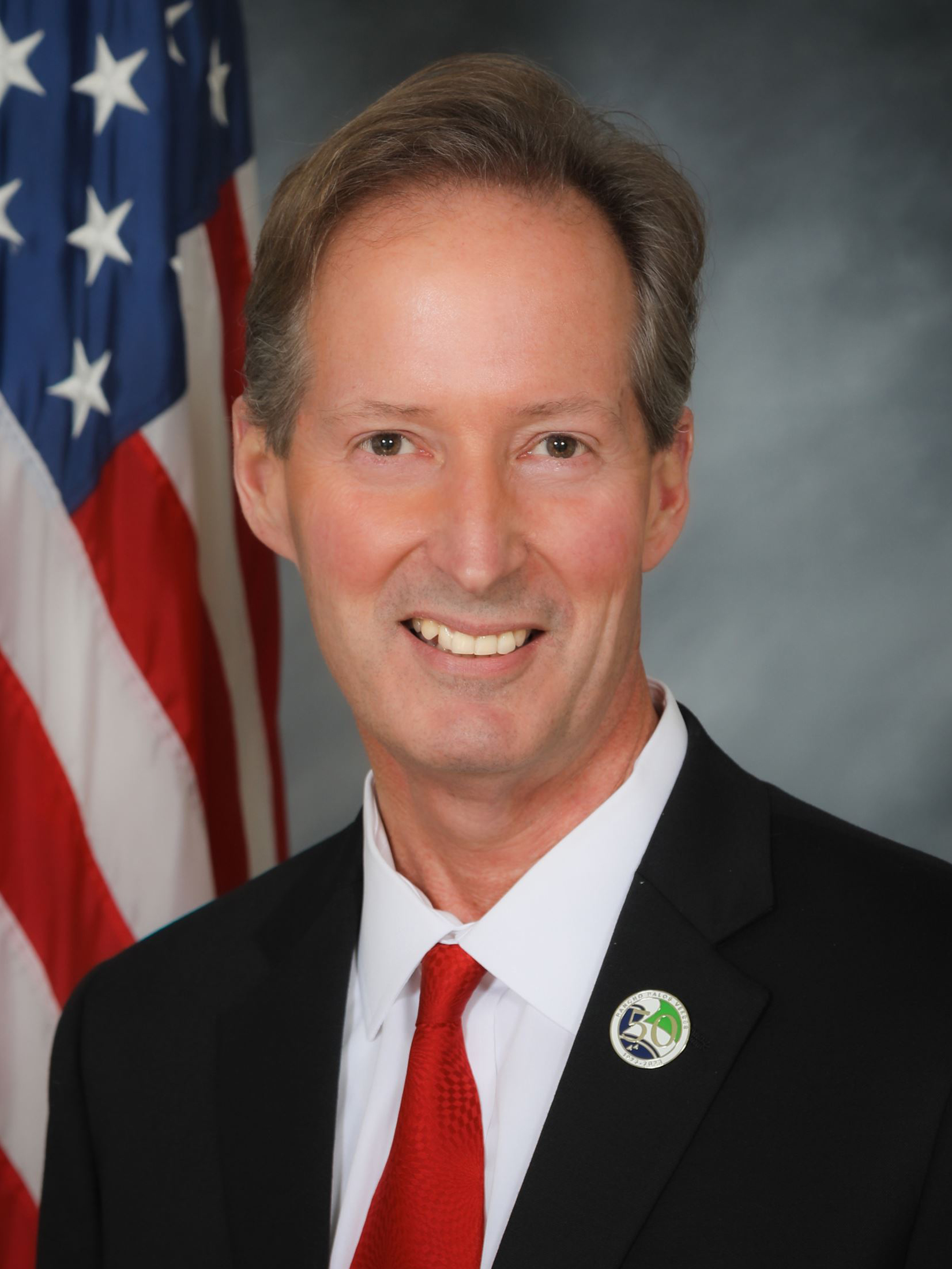
Candidate	Janice Hahn	Alex Villanueva	John Cruikshank
Popular vote	173,324	84,259	42,272
Percentage	57.80%	28.10%	14.10%
County supervisor before election
Janice Hahn
County supervisor
Janice Hahn

The fourth supervisorial comprises the cities of Artesia, Bell, Bell Gardens, Bellflower, Cerritos, Commerce, Cudahy, Hawaiian Gardens, Huntington Park, La Habra Heights, La Mirada, Lakewood, Lomita, Long Beach, Lynwood, Maywood, Norwalk, Palos Verdes Estates, Paramount, Pico Rivera, Rancho Palos Verdes, Rolling Hills, Rolling Hills Estates, Santa Fe Springs, Signal Hill, South Gate, Torrance, Vernon, and Whittier; the communities of East Whittier, Rose Hills, South Whittier, Walnut Park, and West Whittier-Los Nietos; and the Los Angeles neighborhoods of San Pedro and Wilmington. Incumbent supervisor Janice Hahn was re-elected in 2020 with 76.2% of the vote.

=== Candidates ===
- John Cruikshank, mayor of Rancho Palos Verdes
- Janice Hahn, incumbent supervisor
- Alex Villanueva, former Los Angeles County Sheriff

=== Endorsements ===
Janice Hahn

Statewide officials

- Gavin Newsom, Governor of California (2019–present)

County officials

- Kathryn Barger, Los Angeles County supervisor (2016–present)

Local officials

- Tim McOsker, Los Angeles city councilor from the 15th district (2022–present)
- Rex Richardson, Mayor of Long Beach (2022–present)

Trade unions

- International Brotherhood of Electrical Workers Local 11
- International Union of Painters and Allied Trades District Council 36
- Ironworkers Local 433
- Los Angeles County Federation of Labor

Political parties

- Los Angeles County Democratic Party

Organizations

- Stonewall Democrats

=== Results ===
2024 Fourth supervisorial district election
Primary election
Candidate	Votes	%
Janice Hahn (incumbent)	173,324	57.80
Alex Villanueva	84,259	28.10
John Cruikshank	42,272	14.10
Total votes	299,855	100.00

== District 5 ==
2024 Fifth supervisorial district election
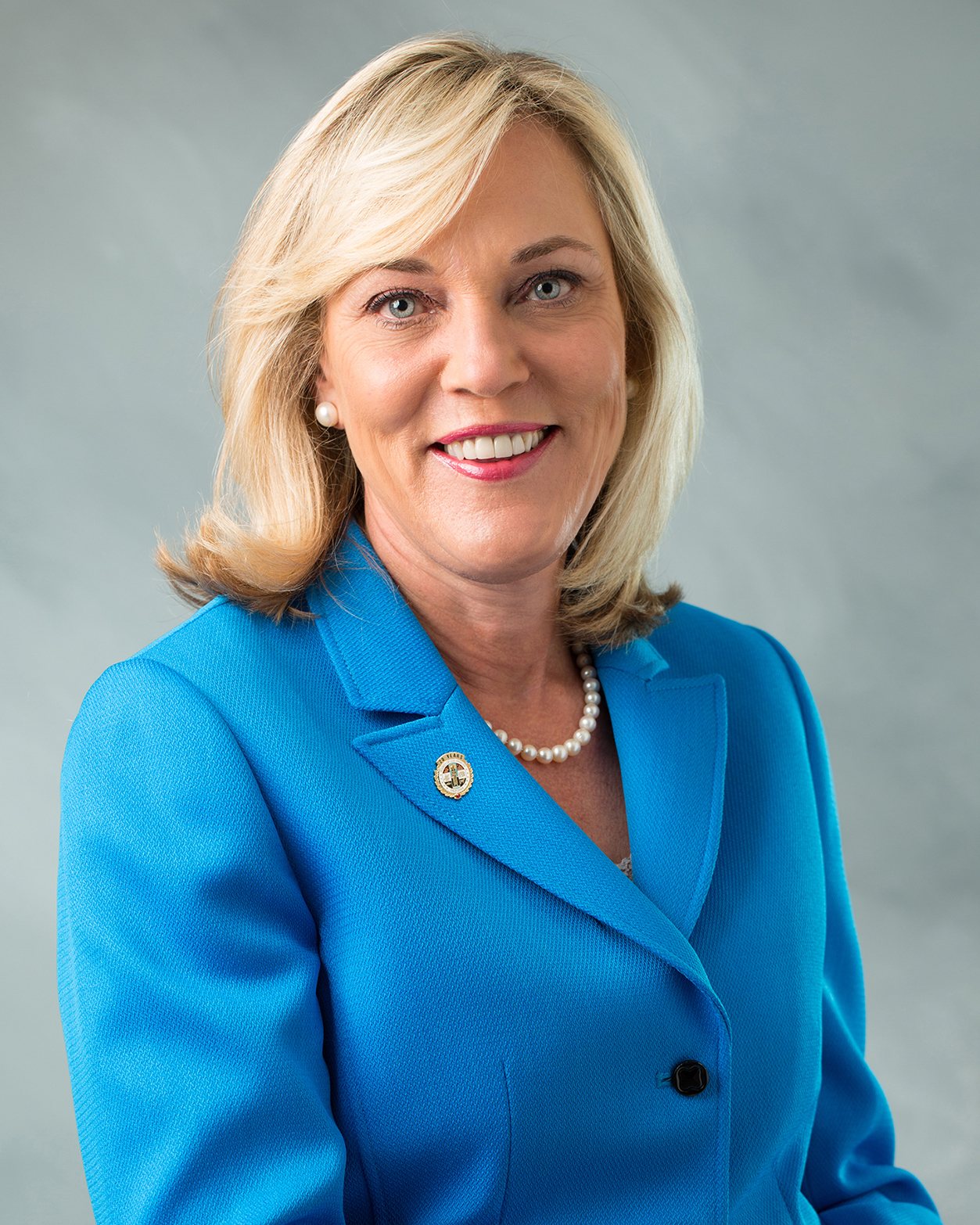

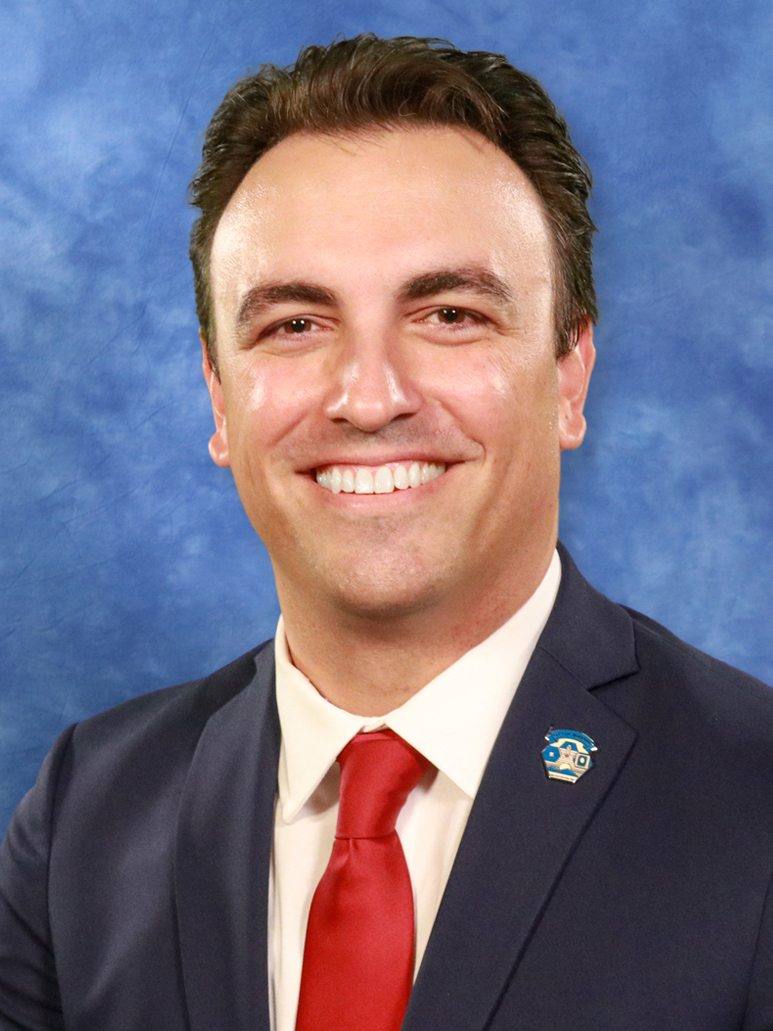

Candidate	Kathryn Barger	Chris Holden
Popular vote	198,083	76,429
Percentage	56.81%	21.92%
Candidate	Konstantine Anthony	Perry Goldberg
Popular vote	39,801	26,588
Percentage	11.42%	7.63%
County supervisor before election
Kathryn Barger
County supervisor
Kathryn Barger

The fifth supervisorial district comprises the cities of Arcadia, Bradbury, Claremont, Duarte, Glendale, Glendora, La Cañada Flintridge, La Verne, Lancaster, Monrovia, Palmdale, Pasadena, San Dimas, San Marino, Santa Clarita, Sierra Madre, South Pasadena, and Temple City; the communities of Acton, Altadena, Castaic, La Crescenta-Montrose, Lake Los Angeles, and Stevenson Ranch; and the Los Angeles neighborhoods of Sunland-Tujunga and North Hollywood. Incumbent supervisor Kathryn Barger was re-elected in 2020 with 58.8% of the vote.

=== Candidates ===
- Konstantine Anthony, Mayor of Burbank
- Kathryn Barger, incumbent supervisor
- Perry Goldberg, nonprofit director
- Chris Holden, California state assemblyman from the 41st district and former mayor of Pasadena
- Marlon Marroquin, tech consultant

=== Endorsements ===
Kathryn Barger

Organizations

- Armenian National Committee of America – Western Region
- Planned Parenthood Advocacy Project

Trade unions

- American Federation of State, County and Municipal Employees District Council 36
- Laborers' International Union of North America Local 300
Chris Holden

State legislators

- Rick Zbur, California state assemblyman from the 51st district (2022–present)

Political parties

- Los Angeles County Democratic Party
- Working Families Party

=== Results ===
2024 Fourth supervisorial district election
Primary election
Candidate	Votes	%
Kathryn Barger (incumbent)	198,083	56.81
Chris Holden	76,429	21.92
Konstantine Anthony	39,801	11.42
Perry Goldberg	26,588	7.63
Marlon Marroquin	7,767	2.23
Total votes	348,668	100.00

== See also ==
- 2024 Los Angeles County elections
