= Konstantine Anthony =

American politician (born 1981)

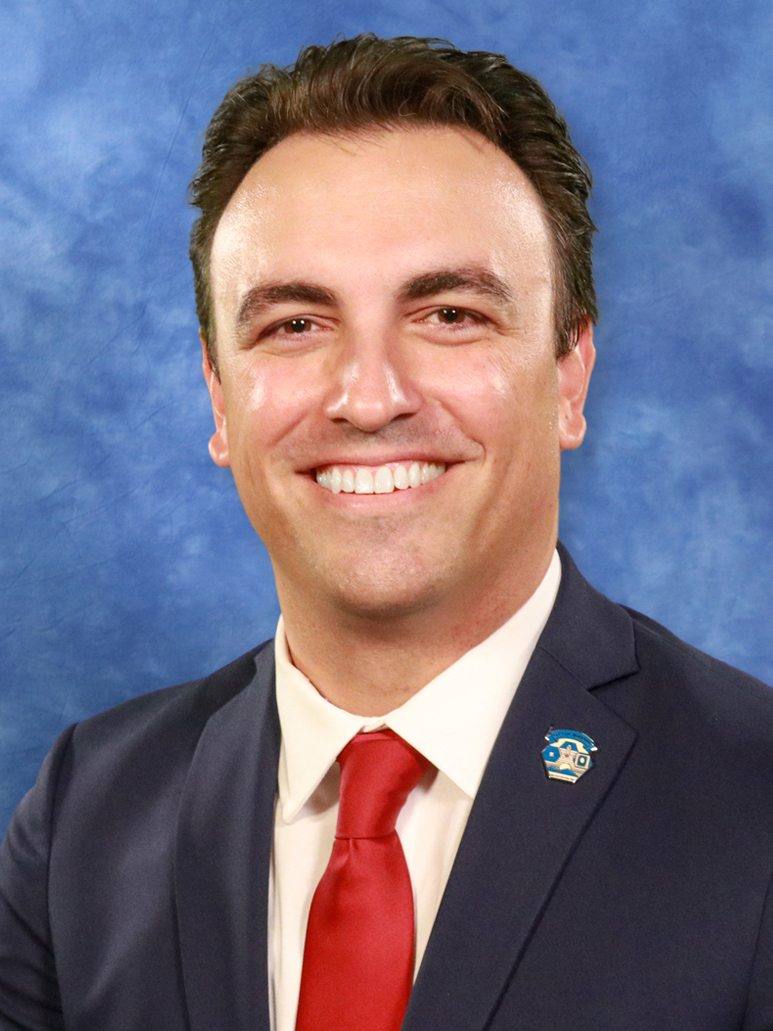
- Official portrait, 2022

Member of the Burbank City Council
- Incumbent
- Assumed office December 14, 2020
- Preceded by: Timothy M. Murphy

Mayor of Burbank, California
- In office December 20, 2022 – December 18, 2023
- Preceded by: Jess Talamantes
- Succeeded by: Nick Schultz

Vice Mayor of Burbank, California
- In office December 23, 2021 – December 20, 2022
- Preceded by: Jess Talamantes
- Succeeded by: Nick Schultz

Personal details
- Born: 1981 (age 44–45) Castro Valley, California, U.S.
- Party: Democratic
- Other political affiliations: Democratic Socialists of America
- Education: San Francisco State University

Konstantine Anthony (born 1981) is an American politician and former actor, serving as a member of the Burbank City Council since 2020. Anthony served as the city's mayor from December 2022 to December 2023.

== Career ==
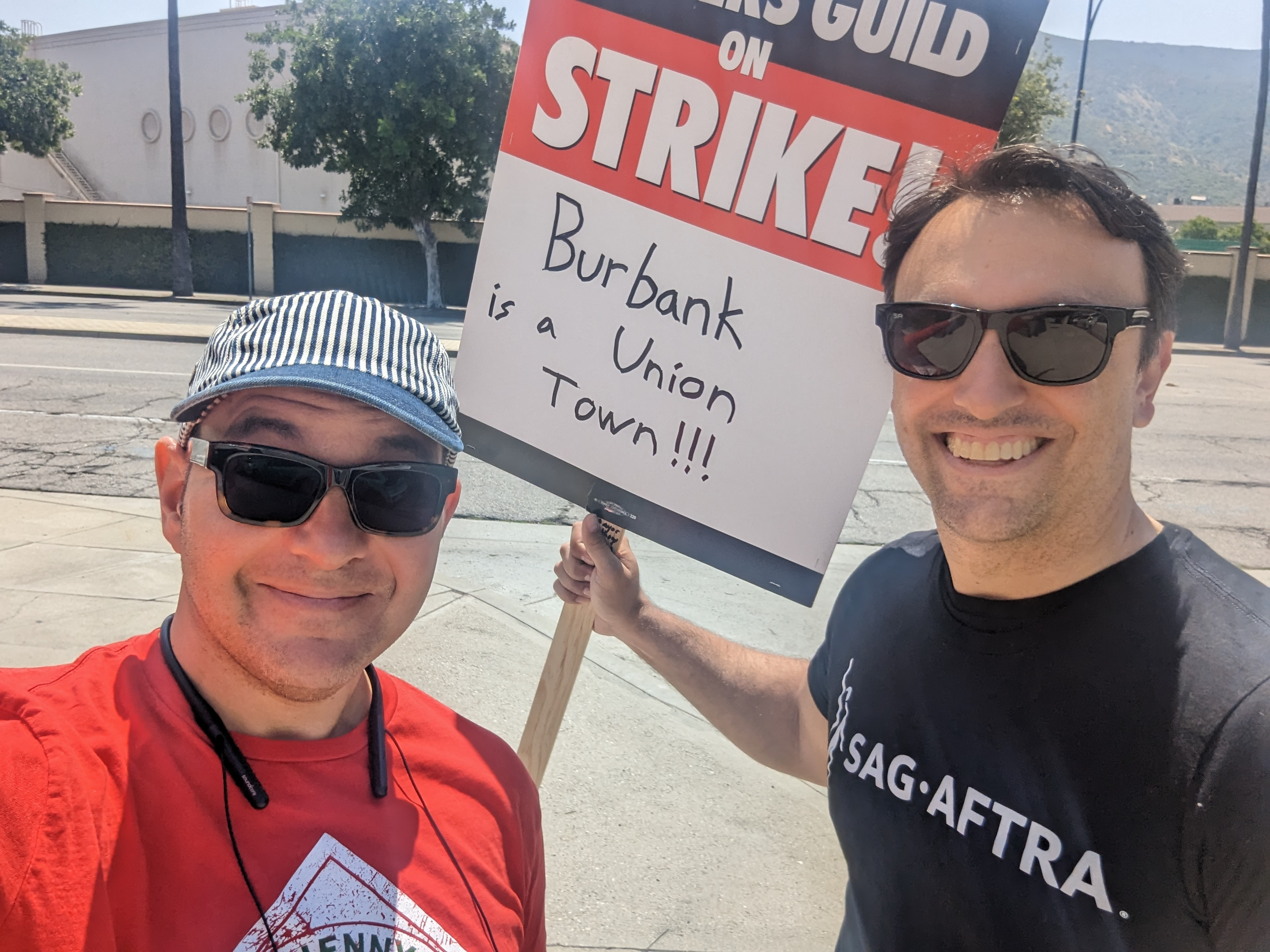
Anthony (right) during the 2023 Writers Guild of America strike.

During the 2023 Writers Guild of America strike, Anthony came out in favor of the WGA and appeared multiple times on their picket lines, alongside other elected officials. Outside of elected office, Anthony is involved with a number of social justice organizations. As a self-identified autistic person, he has been part of the Burbank Advisory Council on Disabilities since 2018, and is a member of the Domestic Violence Task Force. He previously served on the Burbank Transportation Commission from 2017 to 2020. He is a member of the Democratic Socialists of America, which endorsed him in his run for Burbank City Council.

In March 2023, Anthony announced his campaign for the Los Angeles County Board of Supervisors, challenging Republican incumbent Kathryn Barger. Anthony placed third in the 2024 primary, receiving 11.42% of the vote.

=== Endorsements ===
In the 2024 United States Senate election in California, Anthony initially endorsed U.S. representative Adam Schiff. In October 2023, Anthony withdrew his endorsement after Schiff released a statement in support of Israel's "right to defend itself" during the Gaza war. On December 11, 2023, Anthony endorsed Schiff's opponent in the race, Rep. Barbara Lee.
