= William T. Fujioka =

Bill Fujioka

Chief Executive Officer of Los Angeles County
- In office July 23, 2007 – November 30, 2014
- Preceded by: David Janssen
- Succeeded by: Sachi Hamai

City Administrative Officer of Los Angeles
- In office August 1997 – December 2006
- Preceded by: Keith Comrie
- Succeeded by: Karen Sisson

Personal details
- Born: 1953 (age 72–73)
- Education: University of California, Santa Cruz (BA)

William Teruo Fujioka Jr. (Japanese: 藤岡 照雄, 1953 - ) is a former chief executive officer (CEO) of Los Angeles County, having been appointed on July 23, 2007 by the Los Angeles County Board of Supervisors at a starting annual salary of US$310,000. As of September 2, 2013, he earned an annual salary of US$338,458. As the County executive, he administered the largest county in the United States, with an annual budget of US$23 billion and over 100,000 employees.

== Education and career ==
Fujioka attended the University of California, Santa Cruz from 1970 to 1974, earning a Bachelor of Arts degree in sociology. Before his appointment as the County's CEO, Fujioka was the City of Los Angeles' City Administrative Officer from August 1999 to February 2007. Fujioka has been a civil servant since 1975, in positions with the City of Los Angeles and Los Angeles County.

On June 28, 1999, Richard Riordan, then the mayor of Los Angeles, appointed Fujioka as the City's Administrative Officer. Less than a year later, on January 21, 2000, Fujioka was fired by Riordan for his perceived ties with the Los Angeles City Council and conflicts with the mayor. He successfully fought his dismissal and retired after 7 years at his post, in December 2006.

Less than six months later, the Los Angeles County Board of Supervisors voted to appoint Fujioka as the County's new chief executive officer. In 2008, Fujioka ended the 15-year-old practice of weekly press briefings, which had been standard practice since 1993. He retired as CEO of Los Angeles County at the end of November 2014.

Since 2022, Fujioka has served as the chair of the board of trustees for the Japanese American National Museum.

== Personal life ==
Fujioka, a third-generation (sansei) Japanese American, was born to parents William Sr. and Linda Fujioka and raised in Boyle Heights and Montebello, California. He is married to Darlene Kuba. Throughout his career, Fujioka did not publicize his marriage to Kuba, who is a longtime Los Angeles City Hall lobbyist. Fujioka resides in Bradbury, California.
