= 2024 Los Angeles County Measure G =

Ethics-related reform to county charter

2024 Los Angeles Measure G, officially the Los Angeles County Government Structure, Ethics and Accountability Charter Amendment, is a ballot measure which was approved by voters in Los Angeles County, California on November 5, 2024. The measure appeared on the ballot for all Los Angeles County elections.

This measure would amend the county's charter to establish a directly-elected county executive position in Los Angeles County, as well as an independent ethics commission and a nonpartisan legislative analyst. Aside from San Francisco, which is a consolidated city-county, this would make Los Angeles the only Californian county to have a directly elected county executive. The Board of Supervisors would also increase from five to nine elected members and county departments would be required to present annual budgets in public meetings.

The measure is the first significant amendment to the charter's definition of county government since the approval of the charter in 1912.

== Background ==
Los Angeles County is currently governed by a five-member Board of Supervisors, which has appointed a Chief Administrative Officer since 1938 (renamed Chief Executive Officer since 2007). In addition, the Chair of Los Angeles County, the presiding officer over the Board of Supervisors, serves de facto as the executive leader of the county government.

Supervisor Lindsey Horvath was the driving force behind Measure G. On July 3, 2024, County Chair Horvath and Supervisor Janice Hahn introduced Measure G to the Board. On July 9, Supervisor Hilda Solis signaled her support. The Board voted 3-0 on July 30 to refer the measure to the voters, with supervisors Kathryn Barger and Holly Mitchell abstaining from the vote.

== Details ==
Under the plan, the directly-elected county executive will:

- retain the powers of the current appointed Chief Executive Officer;
- assume executive and administrative powers of the Board, save for oversight of the Legislative Analyst/Clerk;
- appoint department heads (excluding Legislative Analyst/Clerk) with Board confirmation;
- remove department heads, with reinstatement by two-thirds Board vote;
- have veto power over Board amendments to the budget, which may be overridden by two-thirds vote;
- lead emergency response efforts.

== Support and opposition ==
Supporters included supervisors Lindsey Horvath and Janice Hahn, as well as the Los Angeles Times; the opposition included supervisors Holly Mitchell and Kathryn Barger, as well as the county fire and sheriff's departments.

== Results ==
On November 5, 2024, Los Angeles County voters approved the measure, with most news outlets calling the result by November 12.

Measure G
Choice	Votes	%
For	1,665,735	51.62
Against	1,561,068	48.38
Total	3,226,803	100.00
Valid votes	3,226,803	85.07
Invalid/blank votes	566,303	14.93
Total votes	3,793,106	100.00
Registered voters/turnout	5,736,803	66.12

== Aftermath ==
Following voters approval of the measure, the Board unanimously approved the creation of a Governance Reform Task Force for reorganizing the county government ahead of the elections for the future offices. Under the plan for implementation:

- 2026: establishment of an independent Ethics Commission and an Office of Ethics Compliance, led by an Ethics Compliance Officer;
- 2028: county-wide election to be held for County Executive;
- 2032:
  - expansion of the Board of Supervisors from five seats to nine following the 2030 United States census and approval of a new district map proposed by the Los Angeles County Redistricting Commission (LACRC) and approved by the outgoing Board of Supervisors;
  - county elections for seven seats (SDs 2, 4, 5, and new SDs 6, 7, 8, 9), two of which will be randomly selected to be elected to initial two-year terms which will not count toward term limits.
- 2034:
  - Establish a Charter Review Commission to meet every 10 years to review governance and the County Charter;
  - Election of four supervisors (SDs 1, 3, and the two SDs initially elected to two-year terms in 2034);
- 2036: Elections for five supervisors (SDs 2, 4, 5 and the remaining two SDs which were initially elected to four-year terms).

=== Unintentional conflict with 2020 Measure J ===
In 2025, it was reported that an unintentional clerical error had resulted in Measure G erasing Measure J, a 2020 county ballot measure that established a mechanism allocating a certain percent of county funds to "anti-incarceration initiatives." As Measure G involved a significant change to the county's charter, the section previously containing Measure J was accidentally not included in Measure G, meaning that county voters effectively voted to rewrite the charter without Measure J. While the county established a budget that is identical to Measure J, the measure effectively lost its constitutional protection and became vulnerable to potential future county board decisions to remove it.

== See also ==
- 2024 Los Angeles County elections
- County executive
