= Carol Lin =

American journalist

- Education: University of California, Los Angeles (B.A.)
- Occupation: Journalist
- Known for: First national anchor to report September 11 attacks
- Spouse(s): William Robinson (died 2003) Mike Dowling (m. 2009)
- Children: 1

Carol Lin is an American former journalist, best known as the first national television news anchor to report on the September 11 attacks, reporting for CNN, at 8:49 a.m. on the day of the attacks. Lin previously worked as a reporter for ABC News and reported for NPR. She subsequently worked for the Los Angeles County Chief Executive Office as a communications director and senior advisor.

== Early life ==
Lin was born to parents Hsi Chuan Chen and Po Chen Lin.

Lin, after graduating from Los Angeles John Marshall High School in 1986, earned a bachelor's degree in history from the University of California, Los Angeles.

== Career ==
Early in her career, Lin served as a weekend news anchor for KTTV in Los Angeles where she worked in the Special Undercover Investigations Unit. She started her reporting career at the Washington, D.C., bureau of CONUS Communications, where she covered the presidency of Ronald Reagan.

=== ABC News ===
In the 1990s, Lin reported for ABC News, where she served as a national correspondent and substitute anchor for Good Morning America and also reported for World News Tonight with Peter Jennings. While with ABC News, Lin's major stories included national reports on the Montana Freeman standoff, the Unabomber arrest, the North Dakota floods, and the JonBenet Ramsey murder case.

=== CNN ===
From 1998 to December 30, 2006, Lin served as a news anchor and correspondent for CNN and was based in the network's worldwide headquarters in Atlanta, Georgia. During her time at CNN, Lin anchored several news programs, including CNN Early Edition, CNN Live at Daybreak, the weekend editions of CNN Newsroom, and the former news-magazine program CNN NewsStand. She covered several major news stories during this time, including the impeachment trial of President Bill Clinton, the 1999 shootings at Columbine High School, the fall of the Taliban in Afghanistan in 2001, and the 2002 rescue of nine miners in Somerset, Pennsylvania, who were trapped for 77 hours.

Lin reported live from New York City's Times Square as part of CNN's worldwide Millennium night coverage on New Year's Eve, December 31, 1999.

She played an integral role in CNN's Election 2000 coverage, anchoring live from the New Hampshire Primary, and from the Democratic Convention from the Staples Center in Los Angeles. Lin also interviewed many of the key players during the Florida vote recount, including Florida Governor Jeb Bush.

Lin traveled the world to report on numerous breaking news stories for CNN, including the rebuilding of Kosovo. She also traveled to Jerusalem during the siege of Bethlehem to cover tensions between Israel and the Palestinian territories.

==== September 11 attacks ====
Lin was the first television anchor to break the news of the September 11 attacks to a worldwide audience. It was three minutes after the attacks began in New York City that CNN interrupted a Ditech TV commercial at 8:49 a.m. EDT with a live picture of the World Trade Center's north tower on fire and Lin reporting from CNN Center in Atlanta:

Yeah. This just in. You are looking at obviously a very disturbing live shot there. That is the World Trade Center, and we have unconfirmed reports this morning that a plane has crashed into one of the towers of the World Trade Center. CNN Center right now is just beginning to work on this story, obviously calling our sources and trying to figure out exactly what happened, but clearly something relatively devastating happening this morning there on the south end of the island of Manhattan. That is once again, a picture of one of the towers of the World Trade Center.

Less than two months after Lin reported the news of the September 11 attacks, she traveled to Pakistan to report on numerous topics for CNN, including Afghan refugees in the country.

=== Later career ===
In 2007, Lin became a visiting lecturer at the USC Annenberg School for Communication and Journalism.

In 2012, Lin joined the Los Angeles County Probation Department as a spokesperson. In 2015, she moved to the Los Angeles County Sheriff's Department to direct their strategic communications unit. In 2018, due to a change in administration, she took a position as senior advisor to the chief executive officer of Los Angeles County. Lin retired from the county in 2021.

== Awards and honors ==
Lin's journalism had been praised by numerous media critics, including Jon Friedman of MarketWatch, who cited how she handled the news of the death of her former ABC News colleague Peter Jennings. Friedman first noted "CNN distinguished itself by sticking to the story and giving a balanced picture of Jennings' career -- thanks in large part to Lin's composure," and went on to write that Lin "was steady, thoughtful and, most of all, reliable -- the essential quality for any journalist working under pressure."

Lin has been honored with numerous awards for her work, including three Los Angeles Press Club Awards. Lin was also the first recipient of the National IMAGE Award by the Organization of Chinese Americans.

== Personal life ==
Lin's husband, William Robinson, an eight-time Emmy Award-winning news producer, died of cancer in 2003. They had one child, who attended the University of California, Berkeley and studied Art Practice and Media Studies, with a minor in Journalism. In February 2009, Lin married Mike Dowling, then UCLA assistant athletic director of operations.
