= John Harabedian =

American attorney and politician

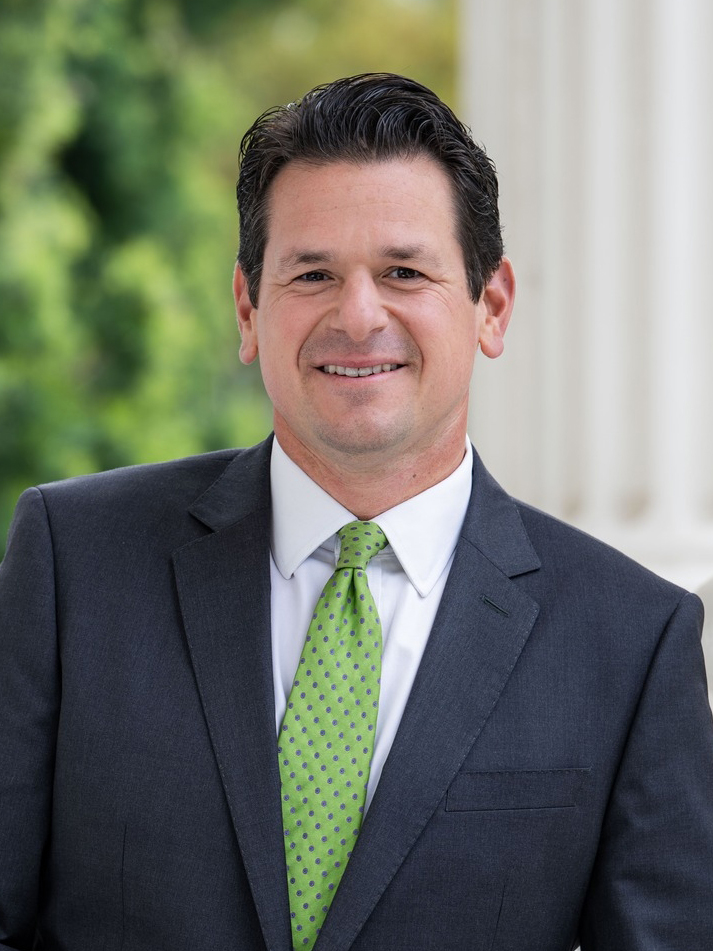
- Official portrait, 2024

Member of the California State Assembly from the 41st district
- Incumbent
- Assumed office December 2, 2024
- Preceded by: Chris Holden

Personal details
- Born: John Christopher Harabedian; 1981 (age 44–45) Sierra Madre, California
- Party: Democratic
- Spouse: Young-Gi
- Children: 3
- Education: Yale University (BA; Oxford University (MSc); Stanford University (JD)

John Christopher Harabedian (born 1981) is an American attorney and politician who is a member of the California State Assembly for the 41st district.

== Early life and education ==
Harabedian was born and raised in Sierra Madre, California by John and Joanne Harabedian, and his father has an Armenian American and Cherokee background. He graduated from Loyola High School. He earned his Bachelor of Arts in political science from Yale University, Master of Science in comparative social policy from Oxford University in 2006, and a Juris Doctor degree from Stanford University in 2010.

== Political career ==
Harabedian was elected to the Sierra Madre City Council in 2012, re-elected in 2016, and served two terms as mayor. He also worked as a deputy district attorney.

=== 2020 Los Angeles County Supervisor campaign ===
Harabedian ran for the Los Angeles County Board of Supervisors in District 5, placing third behind incumbent Kathryn Barger and Darrell Park.

=== California State Assembly ===
Harabedian initially announced that he would run for the California State Senate in the 25th district, but ultimately decided to switch to the California State Assembly in the 41st district.

== Personal life ==
Harabedian lives in Pasadena with his wife, Young-Gi, and their three children.

== Electoral history ==
=== Los Angeles County Supervisor ===
2020 Los Angeles County Board of Supervisors 5th district election
Candidate	Votes	%
Kathryn Barger	240,403	58.7
Darrell Park	84,611	20.7
John Harabedian	84,199	20.6
Total votes	409,213	100.0

=== California State Assembly ===
2024 California State Assembly 41st district election
Primary election
Party	Candidate	Votes	%
Republican	Michelle Del Rosario Martinez	48,800	39.8
Democratic	John Harabedian	36,454	29.7
Democratic	Phlunté Riddle	19,011	15.5
Democratic	Jed Leano	18,356	15.0
Total votes		122,621	100.0
General election
Democratic	John Harabedian	137,293	58.5
Republican	Michelle Del Rosario Martinez	97,336	41.5
Total votes		234,629	100.0
Democratic hold			
