= Los Angeles County Chief Executive Office =

Executive of Los Angeles County, California

Chief Executive Officer of County of Los Angeles
- Seal of Los Angeles

- Flag of Los Angeles
- Incumbent; Joseph M. Nicchitta since May 19, 2026
- Style: CEO
- Type: Executive
- Residence: None Official
- Appointer: Board of Supervisors
- Term length: None
- Website: https://bos.lacounty.gov/

The Los Angeles County Chief Executive Office (LAC CEO), known as the Los Angeles County Chief Administrative Office (LAC CAO) from 1938 to 2007, manages the day-to-day operations of Los Angeles County, California and coordinates implementation with the Board of Supervisors.

== History ==
=== CEO from 2007-2015 ===
The chief executive officer (CEO) supervised 31 out of the 39 departments of the county, and worked closely with the remaining eight (which include the District Attorney, Fire Department and Sheriff's Department, among others). The CEO monitored departmental spending and makes annual recommendations on departmental budgets as well as ensuring that the policies and priorities of the Board are adhered to in its various departments. The CEO oversaw five deputy chief executive officers and two assistant chief executive officers.

Critics of this structure complained about the added layer of bureaucracy with the CEO's office and the creation of deputy chief executive officers who were responsible for coordinating activities within their "cluster" (group of related departments) but were not perceived to add any value. In 2015, the Board voted to revert to the structure prior to 2007.

=== CAO from 1938-2007 and CEO from 2015-present ===
Prior to centralization (similar to a council-manager government prevalent in most of the cities in Los Angeles County) and after reversion to the previous structure, the CEO (CAO prior to 2007) provides Countywide coordination and strategic guidance. Departments report directly to the Board of Supervisors and their deputies and are hired and fired directly by the Board, with the CEO providing administrative support in negotiating department head salaries and facilitating communications between departments when necessary.

Other tasks specifically given to the CEO include preparation and control of the annual budget in consultation with departments, providing leadership and direction for Board-sponsored initiatives and priorities, analysis and advocacy of state and federal legislation; coordinating Countywide strategic communications and cross-departmental public information (including the main County website), and managing capital projects and debt, asset, leasing and space management. The CEO's office also administers the risk management and insurance programs, and facilitates departments addressing unincorporated area issues and international protocol issues, manages the county's employee relations program and compensation/classification systems, represents the Board in labor negotiations, and monitors cable television companies operating in unincorporated areas. The Chief Information Officer, Homeless Initiative (which manages Measure H, the voter-approved homeless tax), child care, and Office of Emergency Management are also located in the CEO's office.

=== Measure G ===
On November 12, 2024, Los Angeles County voters passed Measure G, which amends the Los Angeles County Charter to create an elected County Executive, which will replace County Chair and CEO in 2028 when the office of County Executive is created.

== Chief Administrative/Executive Officers ==
List of former LA County CAOs and CEOs are listed below.

Denotes acting capacity.

Name	Start	End
Chief Administrative Officers
Wayne Allen	September 9, 1938	December 1951
Arthur Will	December 11, 1951	December 1, 1957
Lin Hollinger	January. 14, 1958	December 11, 1970
Arthur Will	December 12, 1970	September 3, 1974
Harry Hufford	September 4, 1974	December 7, 1985
James Hankla	February 14, 1985	February 27, 1987
Harry Hufford; Acting	February 3, 1993	October 17, 1993
Sally Reed	October 18, 1993	June 1, 1996
Sandra Davis; Acting	June 2, 1996	August 24, 1996
David Janssen	August 25, 1996	July 19, 2007
Chief Executive Officers
Bill Fujioka	July 20, 2007	November 30, 2014
Sachi Hamai	December 2, 2014	August 31, 2020
Fesia Davenport	September 1, 2020	April 16, 2026; On leave: October 8, 2025 – April 16, 2026
Joseph Nicchitta	October 8, 2025	May 16, 2026
Joseph Nicchitta	May 16, 2026	present
