= List of the most populous counties in the United States =

A map of the counties and county equivalents of the United States. The 100 most populous counties are highlighted, with counties having more than one million residents in orange and counties having fewer than one million residents in green, based on the results of the April 1, 2020 United States census.

This is a list of the 100 most populous of the 3,144 counties in the United States based on the national decennial US census conducted on April 1, 2020, and vintage Census population estimates for July 1, 2025.

Many of the counties on the list include major cities or metropolitan areas in all parts of the United States. Seven of the listed counties have consolidated city and county government, namely the City and County of Honolulu, Metropolitan Government of Nashville and Davidson County, Tennessee, City and County of Philadelphia, City and County of San Francisco, City of Jacksonville and Duval County, Indianapolis and Marion County, and City and County of Denver. Kings County, Queens County, New York County, Bronx County, and Richmond County are coterminous with the respective boroughs of New York City; they fall under the jurisdiction of the combined Government of New York City. Independent cities are not counted.

Many of the most populous counties listed are in Southern California, Texas, and New York, and roughly correspond to several of the most populous cities or municipalities in the United States. Counties in the Western United States are typically larger by area and therefore often have higher absolute populations even with comparable population densities.

== List ==
This list includes the most populous US counties sorted according to both the 2020 official enumeration and 2025 vintage population estimates by the United States Census Bureau (USCB).

| Rank | County | State | Land area | | April 1, 2020 census | July 1, 2025 estimates | Mid-2020 to mid-2025 change | | County seat |
| Rank | County | State | km^{2} | mi^{2} | April 1, 2020 census | July 1, 2025 estimates | absolute | % | County seat |
|---|---|---|---|---|---|---|---|---|---|
| 1 | Los Angeles | California | 10,509.87 | 4,057.88 | 10,014,009 | 9,694,934 | −319,075 | −3.2 | Los Angeles |
| 2 | Cook | Illinois | 2,448.38 | 945.33 | 5,275,541 | 5,194,625 | −80,916 | −1.5 | Chicago |
| 3 | Harris | Texas | 4,411.99 | 1,703.48 | 4,731,145 | 5,045,026 | 313,881 | 6.6 | Houston |
| 4 | Maricopa | Arizona | 23,828.26 | 9,200.14 | 4,420,568 | 4,689,558 | 268,990 | 6.1 | Phoenix |
| 5 | San Diego | California | 10,895.12 | 4,206.63 | 3,298,634 | 3,282,248 | −16,386 | −0.5 | San Diego |
| 6 | Orange | California | 2,047.56 | 790.57 | 3,186,989 | 3,149,507 | −37,482 | −1.2 | Santa Ana |
| 7 | Miami-Dade | Florida | 4,915.06 | 1,897.72 | 2,701,767 | 2,802,029 | 100,262 | 3.7 | Miami |
| 8 | Dallas | Texas | 2,256.60 | 871.28 | 2,613,539 | 2,661,397 | 47,858 | 1.8 | Dallas |
| 9 | Kings | New York | 183.41 | 70.82 | 2,736,074 | 2,653,963 | −82,111 | −3.0 | Brooklyn, NYC |
| 10 | Riverside | California | 18,664.70 | 7,206.48 | 2,418,185 | 2,544,916 | 126,731 | 5.2 | Riverside |
| 11 | Clark | Nevada | 20,438.71 | 7,891.43 | 2,265,461 | 2,407,226 | 141,765 | 6.3 | Las Vegas |
| 12 | Queens | New York | 281.10 | 108.53 | 2,405,464 | 2,358,182 | −47,282 | −2.0 | Queens, NYC |
| 13 | King | Washington | 5,479.29 | 2,115.57 | 2,269,675 | 2,344,939 | 75,264 | 3.3 | Seattle |
| 14 | Tarrant | Texas | 2,236.74 | 863.61 | 2,110,640 | 2,248,466 | 137,826 | 6.5 | Fort Worth |
| 15 | San Bernardino | California | 51,947.23 | 20,056.94 | 2,181,654 | 2,224,091 | 42,437 | 1.9 | San Bernardino |
| 16 | Bexar | Texas | 3,211.12 | 1,239.82 | 2,009,324 | 2,160,088 | 150,764 | 7.5 | San Antonio |
| 17 | Broward | Florida | 3,133.33 | 1,209.79 | 1,944,375 | 2,013,317 | 68,942 | 3.5 | Fort Lauderdale |
| 18 | Santa Clara | California | 3,341.34 | 1,290.10 | 1,936,259 | 1,914,391 | −21,868 | −1.1 | San Jose |
| 19 | Wayne | Michigan | 1,585.28 | 612.08 | 1,793,561 | 1,769,038 | −24,523 | −1.4 | Detroit |
| 20 | Middlesex | Massachusetts | 2,118.14 | 817.82 | 1,632,002 | 1,669,979 | 37,977 | 2.3 | Lowell and Cambridge |
| 21 | New York | New York | 59.13 | 22.83 | 1,694,251 | 1,664,862 | −29,389 | −1.7 | Manhattan, NYC |
| 22 | Alameda | California | 1,914.05 | 739.02 | 1,682,353 | 1,636,630 | −45,723 | −2.7 | Oakland |
| 23 | Sacramento | California | 2,498.42 | 964.64 | 1,584,169 | 1,618,460 | 34,291 | 2.2 | Sacramento |
| 24 | Palm Beach | Florida | 5,100.00 | 1,970.00 | 1,492,191 | 1,575,726 | 83,535 | 5.6 | West Palm Beach |
| 25 | Philadelphia | Pennsylvania | 347.32 | 134.10 | 1,603,797 | 1,574,281 | −29,516 | −1.8 | Philadelphia |
| 26 | Hillsborough | Florida | 2,642.34 | 1,020.21 | 1,459,762 | 1,574,115 | 114,353 | 7.8 | Tampa |
| 27 | Suffolk | New York | 2,362.20 | 912.05 | 1,525,920 | 1,546,090 | 20,170 | 1.3 | Riverhead |
| 28 | Orange | Florida | 2,339.87 | 903.43 | 1,429,908 | 1,528,002 | 98,094 | 6.9 | Orlando |
| 29 | Bronx | New York | 109.03 | 42.10 | 1,472,654 | 1,406,332 | −66,322 | −4.5 | Bronx, NYC |
| 30 | Nassau | New York | 737.41 | 284.72 | 1,395,774 | 1,398,939 | 3,165 | 0.2 | Mineola |
| 31 | Travis | Texas | 2,564.61 | 990.20 | 1,290,188 | 1,389,670 | 99,482 | 7.7 | Austin |
| 32 | Franklin | Ohio | 1,378.36 | 532.19 | 1,323,807 | 1,361,536 | 37,729 | 2.9 | Columbus |
| 33 | Collin | Texas | 2,178.76 | 841.22 | 1,064,465 | 1,297,179 | 232,714 | 21.9 | McKinney |
| 34 | Oakland | Michigan | 2,247.24 | 867.66 | 1,274,395 | 1,288,337 | 13,942 | 1.1 | Pontiac |
| 35 | Hennepin | Minnesota | 1,433.79 | 553.59 | 1,281,565 | 1,284,784 | 3,219 | 0.3 | Minneapolis |
| 36 | Wake | North Carolina | 2,163.21 | 835.22 | 1,129,410 | 1,257,235 | 127,825 | 11.3 | Raleigh |
| 37 | Mecklenburg | North Carolina | 1,356.75 | 523.84 | 1,115,482 | 1,233,383 | 117,901 | 10.6 | Charlotte |
| 38 | Cuyahoga | Ohio | 1,184.12 | 457.19 | 1,264,817 | 1,232,925 | −31,892 | −2.5 | Cleveland |
| 39 | Allegheny | Pennsylvania | 1,890.88 | 730.07 | 1,250,578 | 1,225,035 | −25,543 | −2.0 | Pittsburgh |
| 40 | Salt Lake | Utah | 1,922.50 | 742.28 | 1,185,238 | 1,220,916 | 35,678 | 3.0 | Salt Lake City |
| 41 | Contra Costa | California | 1,854.27 | 715.94 | 1,165,927 | 1,170,070 | 4,143 | 0.4 | Martinez |
| 42 | Fairfax | Virginia | 1,012.60 | 390.97 | 1,150,309 | 1,167,873 | 17,564 | 1.5 | Fairfax |
| 43 | Fulton | Georgia | 1,363.98 | 526.63 | 1,066,710 | 1,098,791 | 32,081 | 3.0 | Atlanta |
| 44 | Pima | Arizona | 23,794.31 | 9,187.04 | 1,043,433 | 1,074,685 | 31,252 | 3.0 | Tucson |
| 45 | Montgomery | Maryland | 1,272.34 | 491.25 | 1,062,061 | 1,074,582 | 12,521 | 1.2 | Rockville |
| 46 | Denton | Texas | 2,275.13 | 878.43 | 906,422 | 1,069,346 | 162,924 | 18.0 | Denton |
| 47 | Duval | Florida | 1,974.07 | 762.19 | 995,567 | 1,062,963 | 67,396 | 6.8 | Jacksonville |
| 48 | Fresno | California | 15,431.13 | 5,957.99 | 1,008,654 | 1,035,456 | 26,802 | 2.7 | Fresno |
| 49 | Gwinnett | Georgia | 1,114.69 | 430.38 | 957,062 | 1,018,099 | 61,037 | 6.4 | Lawrenceville |
| 50 | Westchester | New York | 1,114.98 | 430.50 | 1,004,457 | 1,015,743 | 11,286 | 1.1 | White Plains |
| 51 | Capitol | Connecticut | 2,660.80 | 1,027.34 | 976,248 | 994,115 | 17,867 | 1.8 | Hartford |
| 52 | Marion | Indiana | 1,026.41 | 396.30 | 977,203 | 992,196 | 14,993 | 1.5 | Indianapolis |
| 53 | St. Louis | Missouri | 1,315.20 | 507.80 | 1,004,125 | 990,911 | −13,214 | −1.3 | Clayton |
| 54 | Honolulu | Hawaii | 1,555.92 | 600.74 | 1,016,508 | 988,703 | −27,805 | −2.7 | Honolulu |
| 55 | Bergen | New Jersey | 603.49 | 233.01 | 955,732 | 977,026 | 21,294 | 2.2 | Hackensack |
| 56 | Fort Bend | Texas | 2,292 | 885 | 822,779 | 975,191 | 152,412 | 18.5 | Richmond |
| 57 | Prince George's | Maryland | 1,250.16 | 482.69 | 967,201 | 970,374 | 3,173 | 0.3 | Upper Marlboro |
| 58 | Pinellas | Florida | 709.14 | 273.80 | 959,107 | 948,563 | −10,544 | −1.1 | Clearwater |
| 59 | Erie | New York | 2,700.56 | 1,042.69 | 954,236 | 946,741 | −7,495 | −0.8 | Buffalo |
| 60 | Pierce | Washington | 4,324.01 | 1,669.51 | 921,130 | 946,288 | 25,158 | 2.7 | Tacoma |
| 61 | DuPage | Illinois | 848.22 | 327.50 | 932,877 | 934,298 | 1,421 | 0.2 | Wheaton |
| 62 | Kern | California | 21,061.57 | 8,131.92 | 909,235 | 927,068 | 17,833 | 2.0 | Bakersfield |
| 63 | Milwaukee | Wisconsin | 625.23 | 241.40 | 939,489 | 924,216 | −15,273 | −1.6 | Milwaukee |
| 64 | Hidalgo | Texas | 4,068.52 | 1,570.87 | 870,781 | 921,549 | 50,768 | 5.8 | Edinburg |
| 65 | Shelby | Tennessee | 1,976.61 | 763.17 | 929,744 | 910,226 | −19,518 | −2.1 | Memphis |
| 66 | Essex | New Jersey | 326.89 | 126.21 | 863,728 | 896,379 | 32,651 | 3.8 | Newark |
| 67 | Worcester | Massachusetts | 3,912.88 | 1,510.77 | 862,111 | 888,502 | 26,391 | 3.1 | Worcester |
| 68 | Macomb | Michigan | 1,241.18 | 479.22 | 881,217 | 886,221 | 5,004 | 0.6 | Mount Clemens |
| 69 | Middlesex | New Jersey | 800.08 | 308.91 | 863,162 | 883,335 | 20,173 | 2.3 | New Brunswick |
| 70 | El Paso | Texas | 2,622.86 | 1,012.69 | 865,657 | 877,858 | 12,201 | 1.4 | El Paso |
| 71 | Montgomery | Pennsylvania | 1,251.07 | 483.04 | 856,553 | 877,643 | 21,090 | 2.5 | Norristown |
| 72 | Lee | Florida | 2,031.88 | 784.51 | 760,822 | 875,607 | 114,785 | 15.1 | Fort Myers |
| 73 | Polk | Florida | 4,660 | 1,798 | 725,046 | 874,790 | 149,744 | 20.7 | Bartow |
| 74 | Snohomish | Washington | 5,406.01 | 2,087.27 | 827,957 | 870,656 | 42,699 | 5.2 | Everett |
| 75 | Baltimore | Maryland | 1,549.59 | 598.30 | 854,535 | 847,650 | −6,885 | −0.8 | Towson |
| 76 | Hamilton | Ohio | 1,051.30 | 405.91 | 830,639 | 838,418 | 7,779 | 0.9 | Cincinnati |
| 77 | Ventura | California | 4,773.69 | 1,843.13 | 843,843 | 830,851 | −12,992 | −1.5 | Ventura |
| 78 | Essex | Massachusetts | 1,275.73 | 492.56 | 809,829 | 826,653 | 16,824 | 2.1 | Salem and Lawrence |
| 79 | San Francisco | California | 121.40 | 46.87 | 873,965 | 826,079 | −47,886 | −5.5 | San Francisco |
| 80 | San Joaquin | California | 3,603.51 | 1,391.32 | 779,233 | 823,815 | 44,582 | 5.7 | Stockton |
| 81 | Oklahoma | Oklahoma | 1,835.83 | 708.82 | 796,292 | 822,125 | 25,833 | 3.2 | Oklahoma City |
| 82 | Multnomah | Oregon | 1,117.05 | 431.30 | 815,428 | 795,391 | −20,037 | −2.5 | Portland |
| 83 | Jefferson | Kentucky | 985.27 | 380.42 | 782,969 | 795,222 | 12,253 | 1.6 | Louisville |
| 84 | Cobb | Georgia | 879.43 | 339.55 | 766,149 | 793,345 | 27,196 | 3.5 | Marietta |
| 85 | Suffolk | Massachusetts | 150.62 | 58.15 | 797,936 | 791,891 | −6,045 | −0.8 | Boston |
| 86 | Montgomery | Texas | 2,699.23 | 1,042.18 | 620,443 | 781,194 | 160,751 | 25.9 | Conroe |
| 87 | DeKalb | Georgia | 693.03 | 267.58 | 764,382 | 774,394 | 10,012 | 1.3 | Decatur |
| 88 | Utah | Utah | 5,188.91 | 2,003.45 | 659,399 | 759,859 | 100,460 | 15.2 | Provo |
| 89 | El Paso | Colorado | 5,508.39 | 2,126.80 | 730,395 | 757,040 | 26,645 | 3.6 | Colorado Springs |
| 90 | Williamson | Texas | 2,889.99 | 1,115.83 | 609,017 | 752,827 | 143,810 | 23.6 | Georgetown |
| 91 | Monroe | New York | 1,702.15 | 657.21 | 759,443 | 750,506 | −8,937 | −1.2 | Rochester |
| 92 | Davidson | Tennessee | 1,305.44 | 504.03 | 715,884 | 745,904 | 30,020 | 4.2 | Nashville |
| 93 | San Mateo | California | 1,161.37 | 448.41 | 764,442 | 743,568 | −20,874 | −2.7 | Redwood City |
| 94 | Denver | Colorado | 401.36 | 154.97 | 715,522 | 740,613 | 25,091 | 3.5 | Denver |
| 95 | Norfolk | Massachusetts | 1,025.91 | 396.11 | 725,981 | 739,749 | 13,768 | 1.9 | Dedham |
| 96 | Hudson | New Jersey | 119.63 | 46.19 | 724,854 | 735,033 | 10,179 | 1.4 | Jersey City |
| 97 | Jackson | Missouri | 1,565.55 | 604.46 | 717,204 | 732,994 | 15,790 | 2.2 | Independence and Kansas City |
| 98 | Lake | Illinois | 1,149.10 | 443.67 | 714,342 | 719,339 | 4,997 | 0.7 | Waukegan |
| 99 | Will | Illinois | 2,167.58 | 836.91 | 696,355 | 712,253 | 15,898 | 2.3 | Joliet |
| 100 | Tulsa | Oklahoma | 1,476.94 | 570.25 | 669,279 | 698,782 | 29,503 | 4.4 | Tulsa |

== Gallery ==
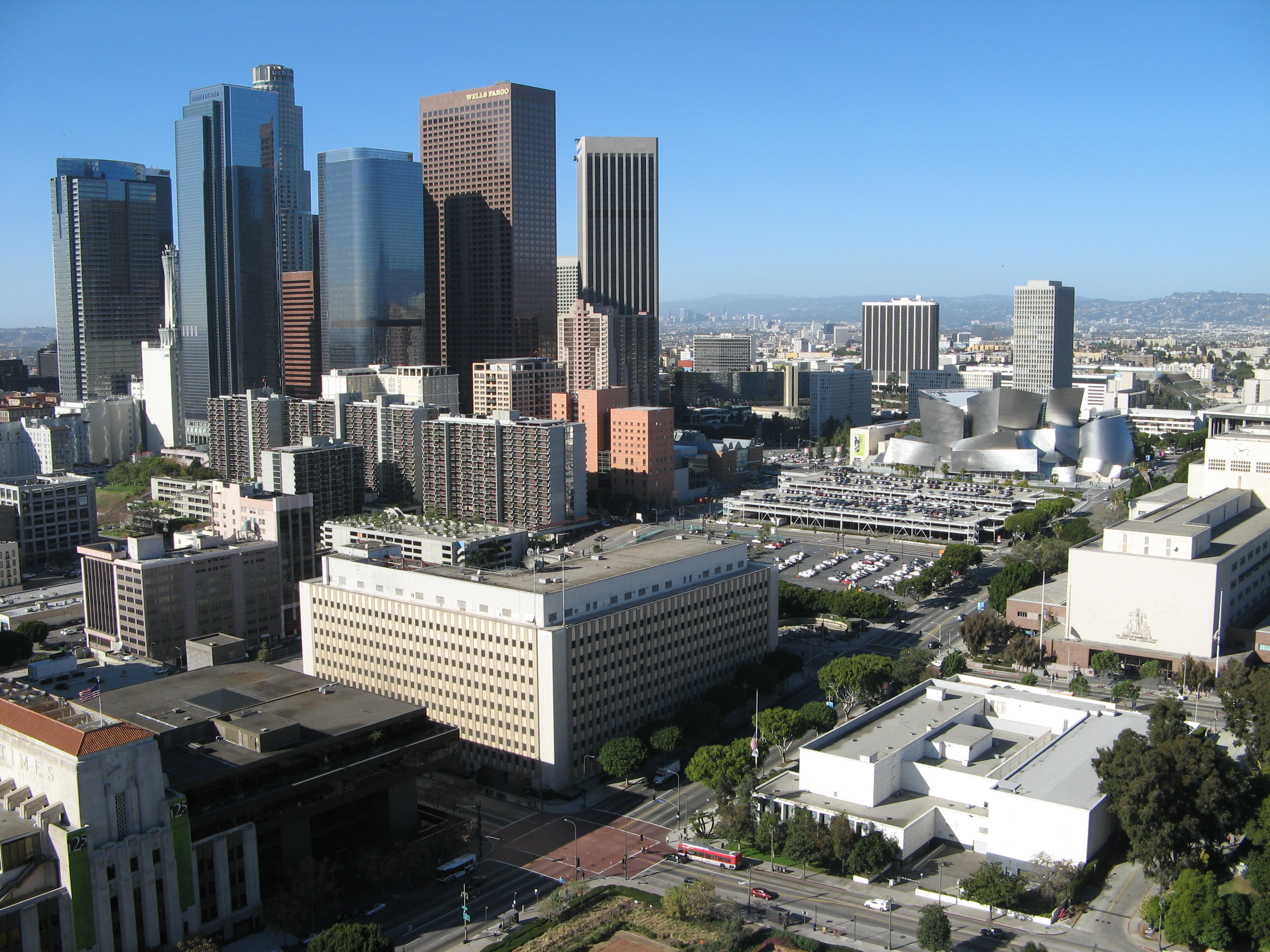
Downtown Los Angeles, county seat of Los Angeles County, California, the most populous county in the United States

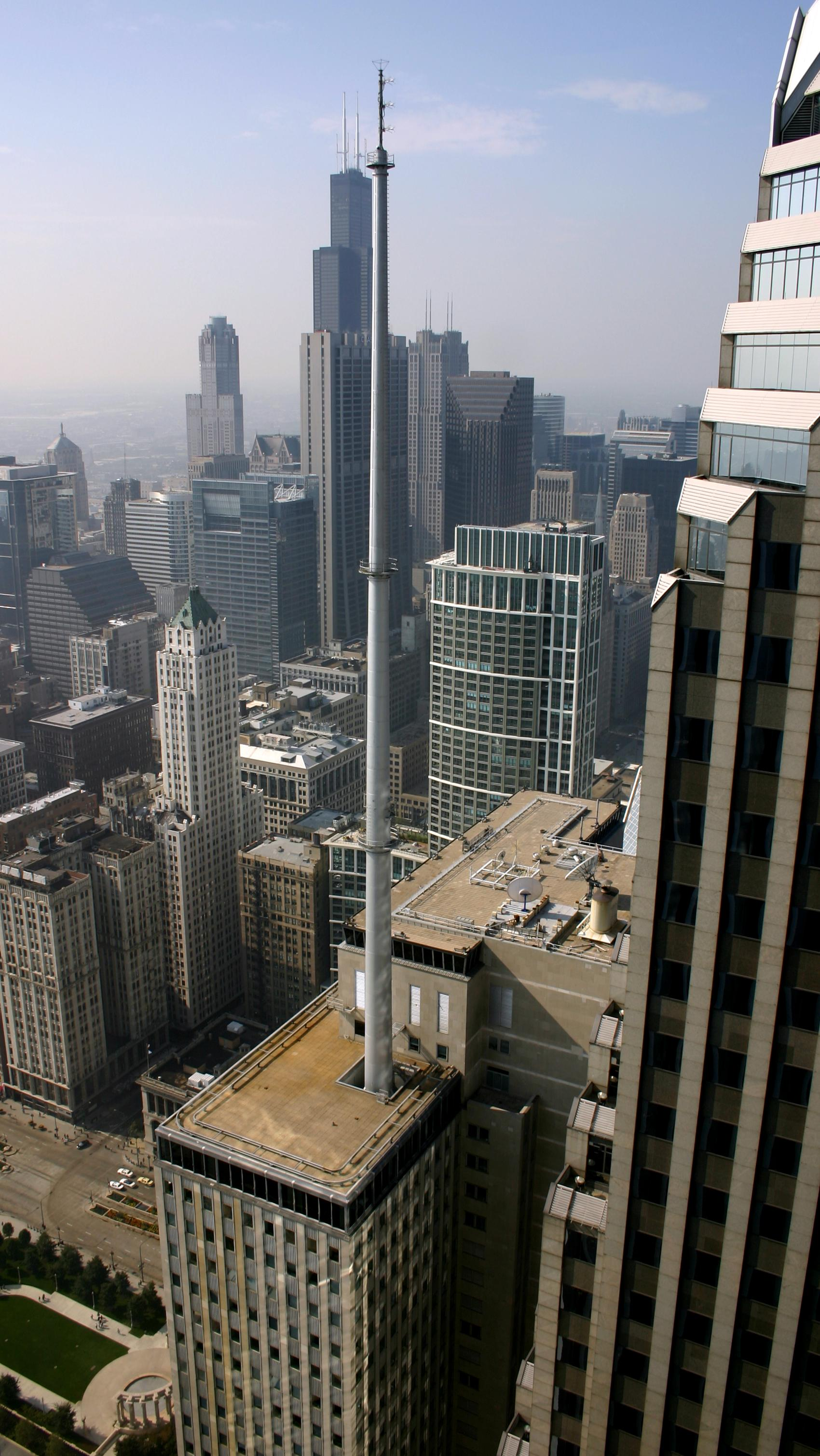
Downtown Chicago in Cook County, Illinois, the second-most populous county in the United States

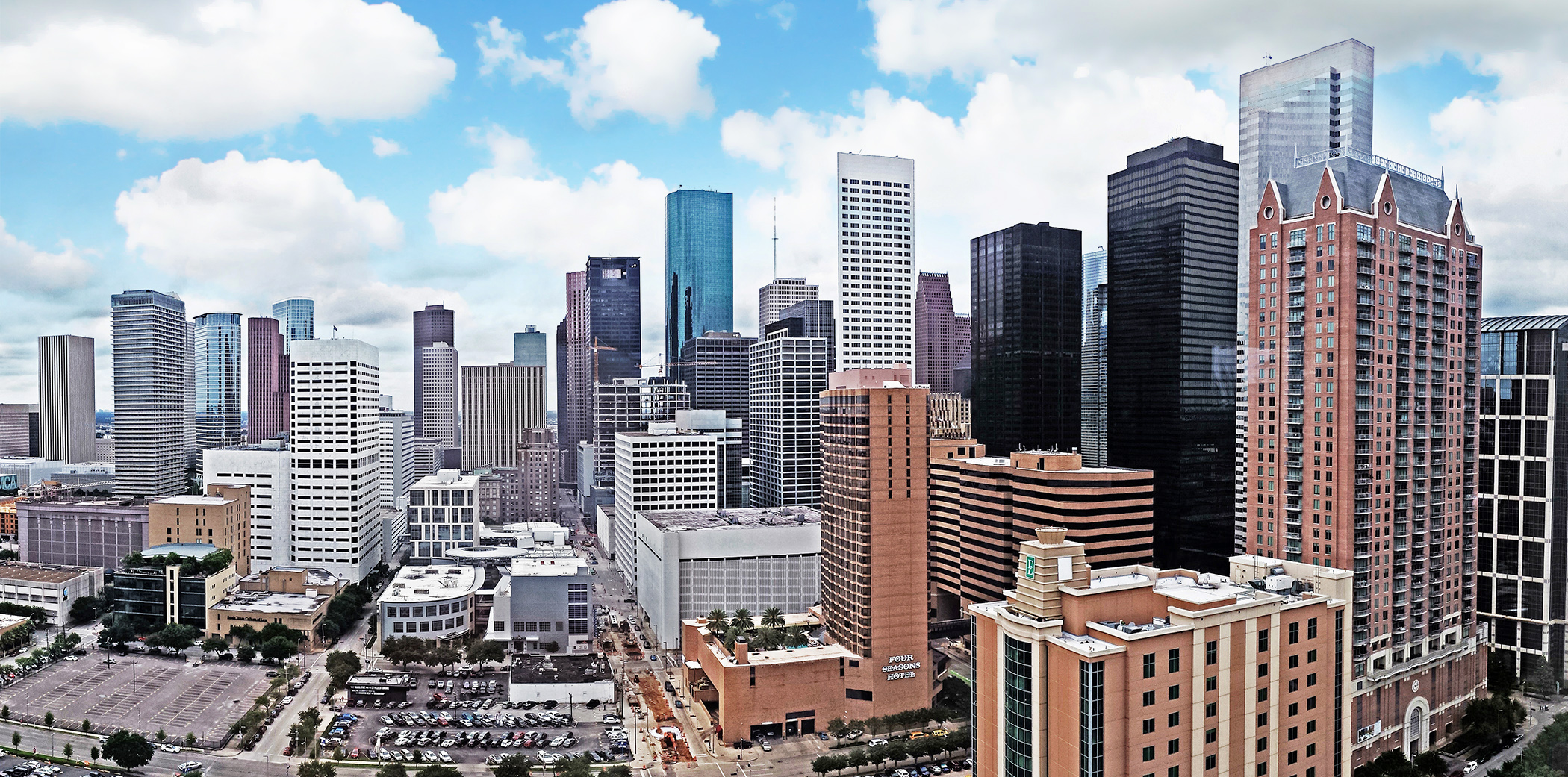
Downtown Houston in Harris County, Texas, the third-most populous county in the United States

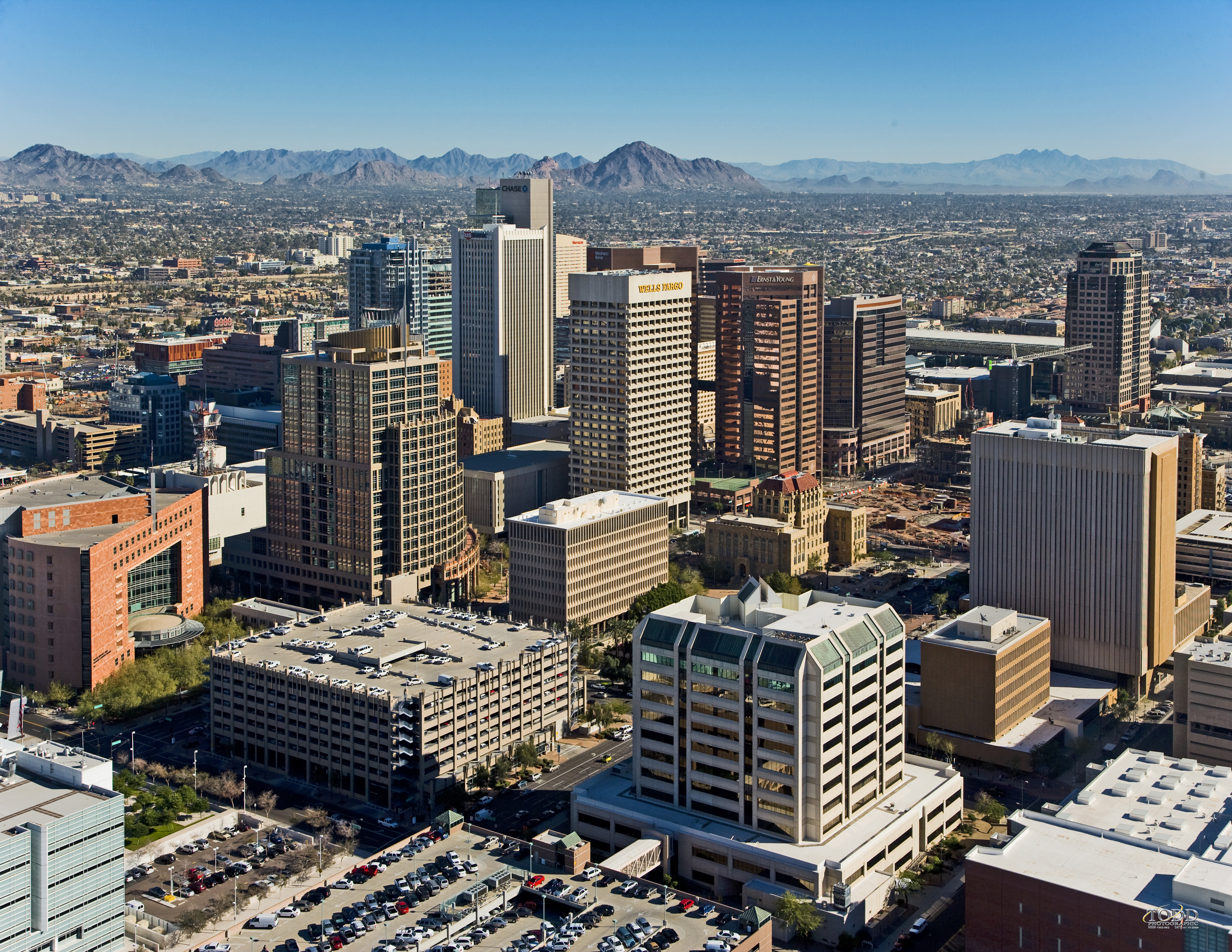
Phoenix, Arizona, county seat of the Maricopa County, Arizona, the nation's fourth-most populous county

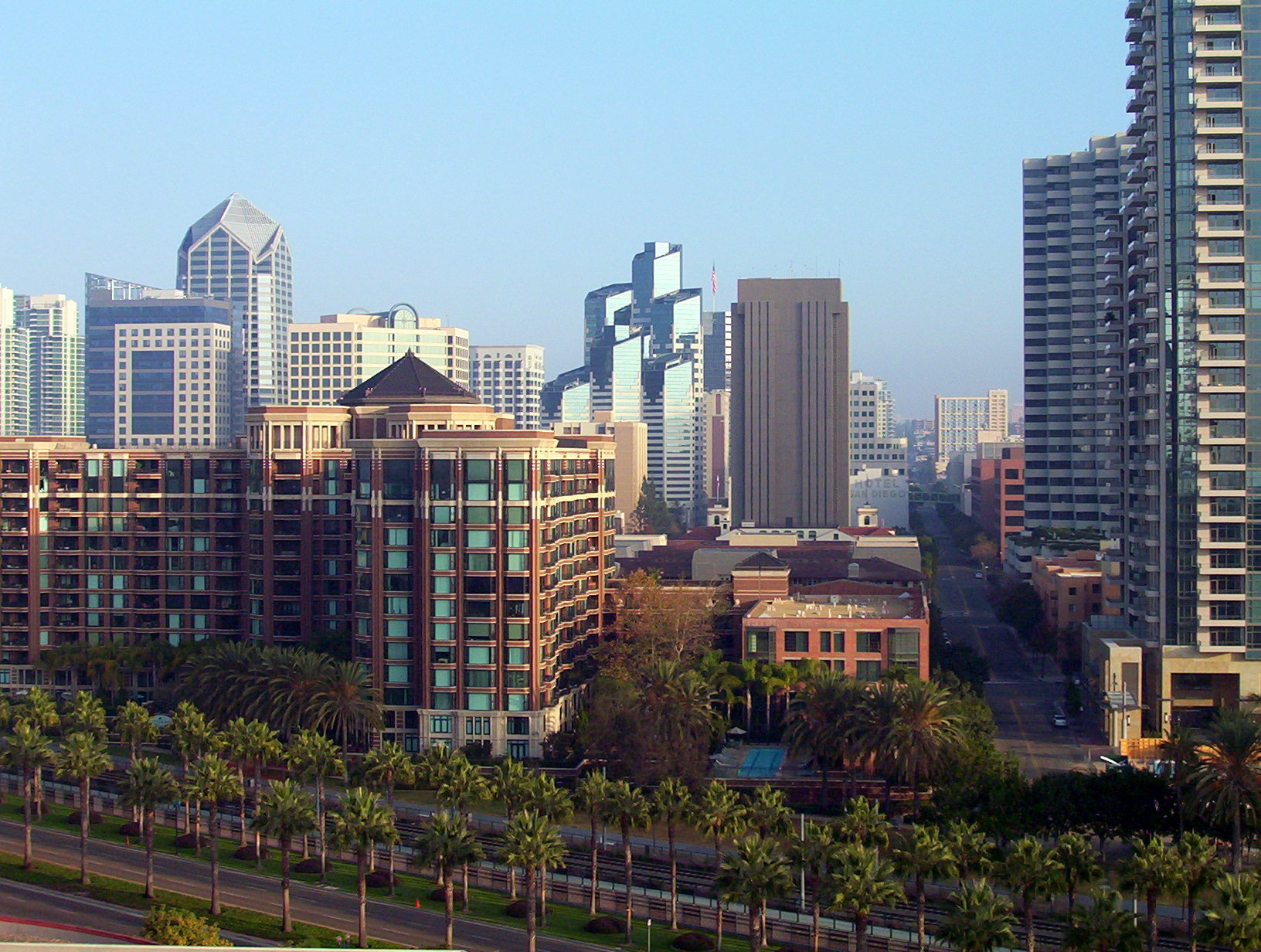
Downtown San Diego, California. San Diego County is the fifth-most populous county in the United States

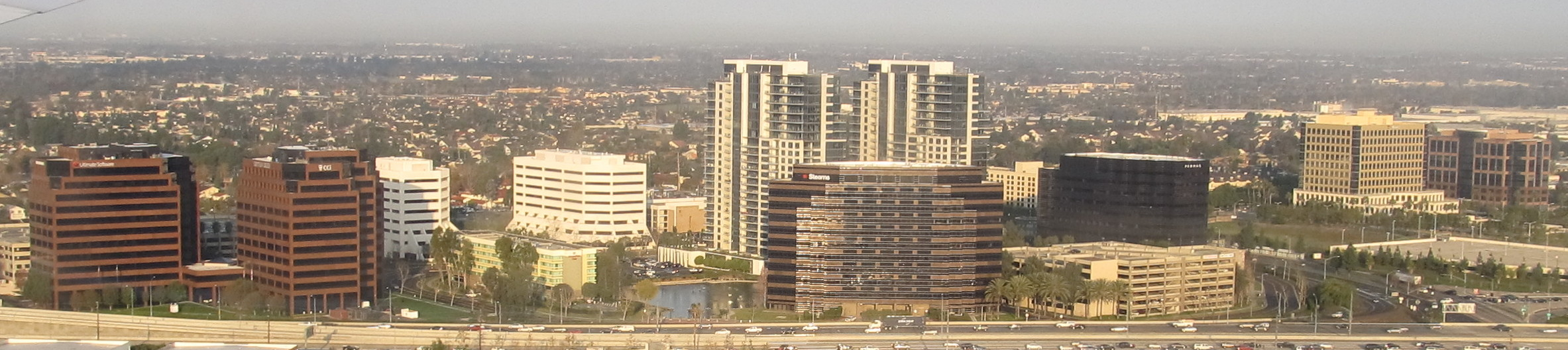
South Coast Metro district in Orange County, California,
the sixth-most populous county in the United States

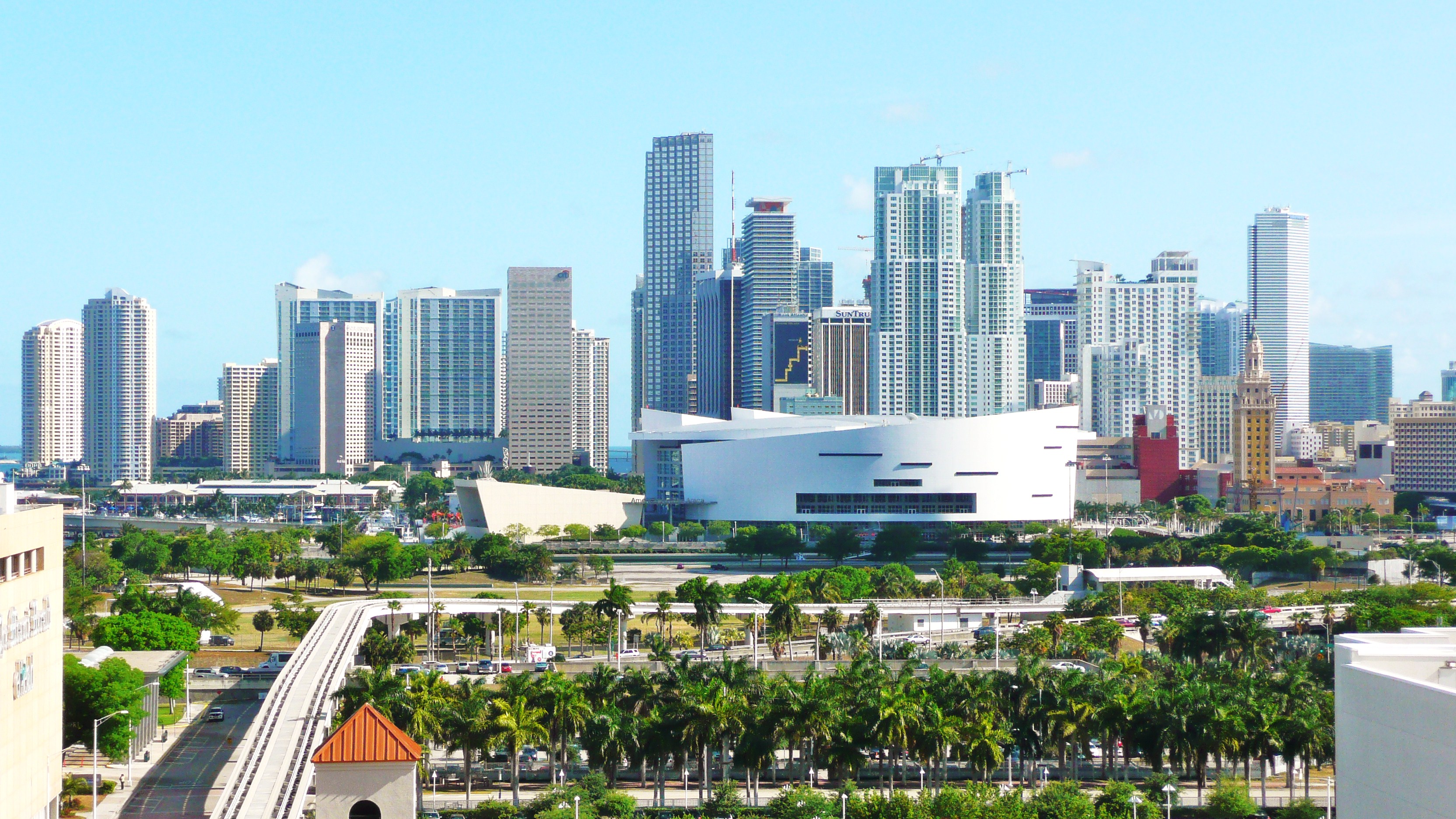
Downtown Miami in Miami-Dade County, the largest county in Florida and county seat of the seventh-most populous county in the United States

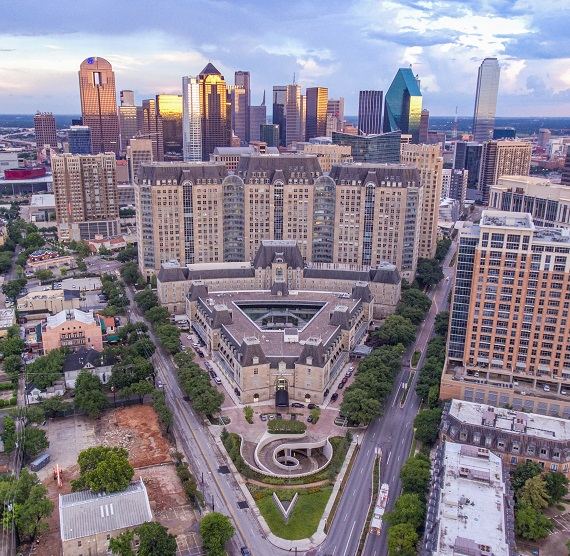
Uptown, Dallas with Downtown Dallas on the end, in Dallas County, Texas, the eighth-most populous county in the United States

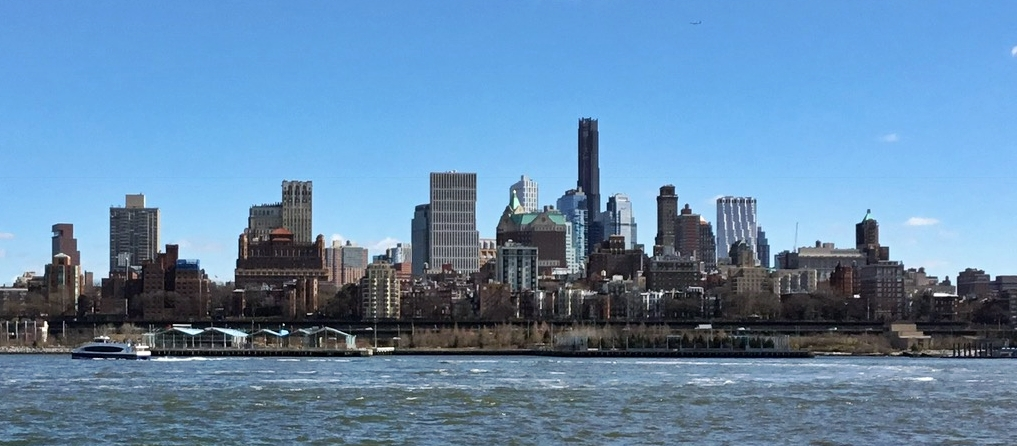
Brooklyn in Kings County, New York, the ninth-most populous county in the United States

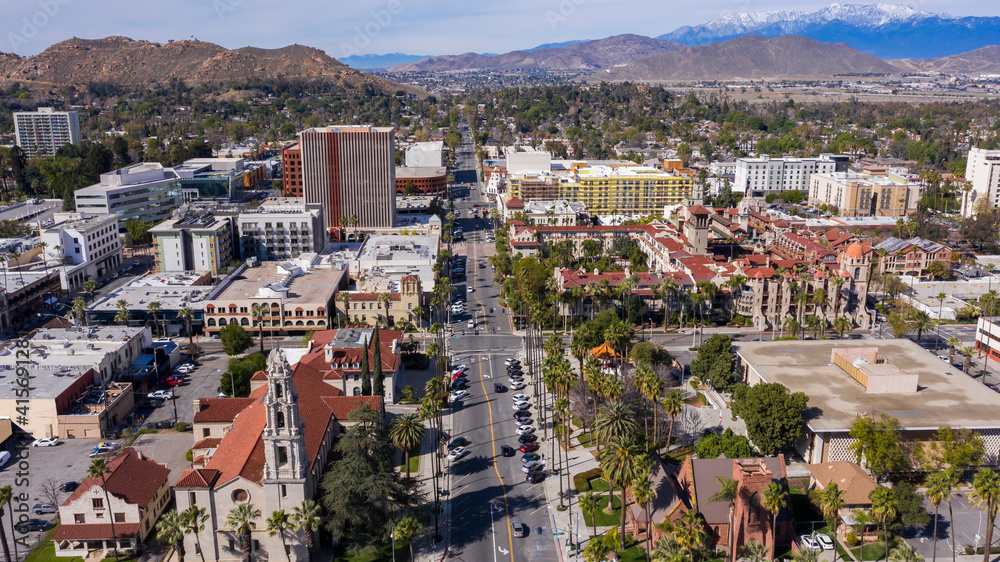
Riverside, California, the county seat of Riverside County, California, the tenth-most populous county in the United States
