= Kathryn Barger =

American politician

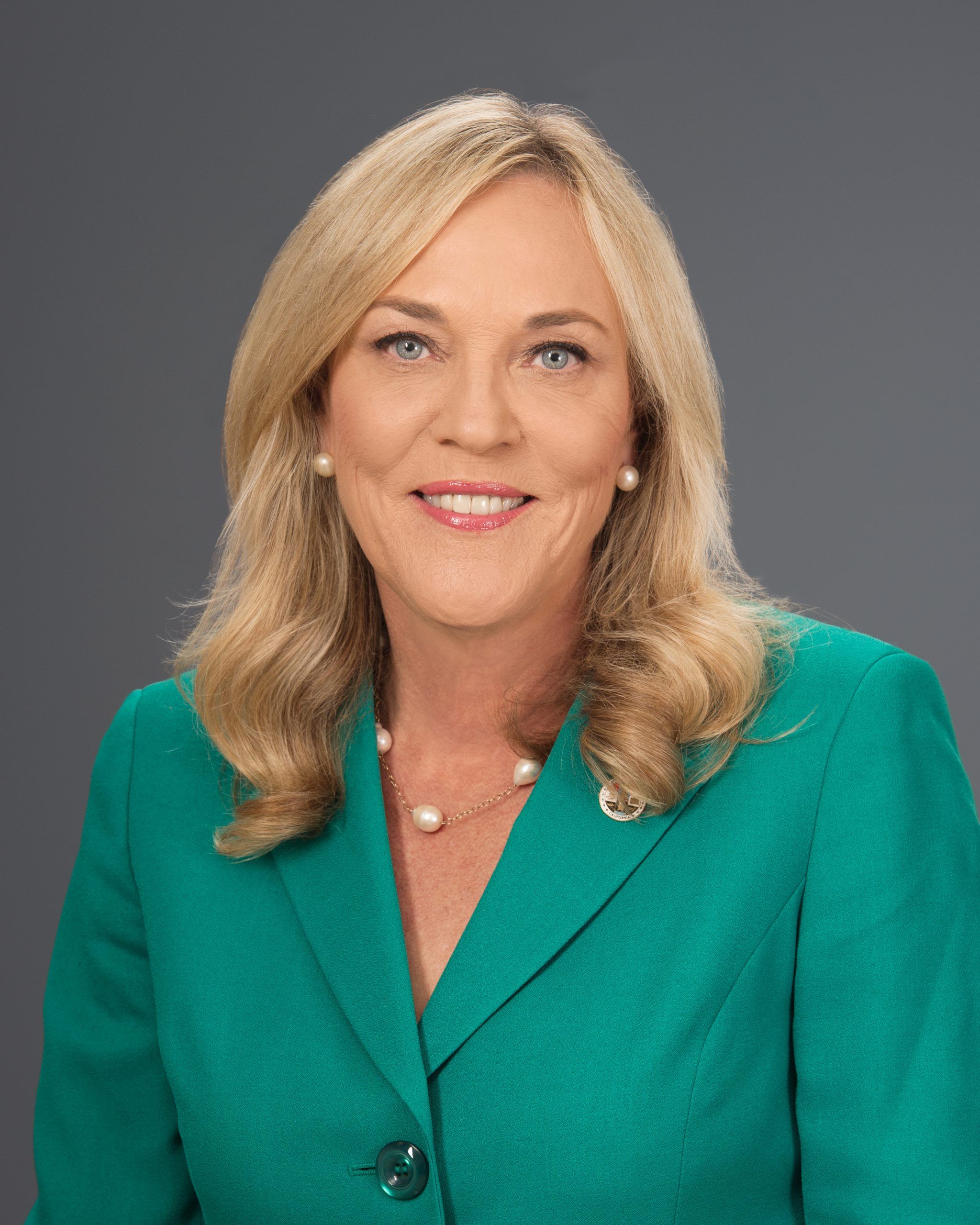
- Official portrait, 2020

Chair of Los Angeles County
- In office December 3, 2024 – December 2, 2025
- Preceded by: Lindsey Horvath
- Succeeded by: Hilda Solis
- In office December 3, 2019 – December 8, 2020
- Preceded by: Janice Hahn
- Succeeded by: Hilda Solis

Member of the Los Angeles County Board of Supervisors from the 5th district
- Incumbent
- Assumed office December 5, 2016
- Preceded by: Michael D. Antonovich

Personal details
- Born: 1960 (age 65–66)
- Party: Republican
- Education: Ohio Wesleyan University (BA)
- Website: Official website

Kathryn Ann Barger-Leibrich (born in 1960) is an American politician who is a member of the Los Angeles County Board of Supervisors for the 5th District since 2016. A member of the Republican Party, Barger served as Chair of Los Angeles County from 2019–2020 and 2024–2025. She previously served as Chief Deputy Supervisor and Chief of Staff to her predecessor Mayor Michael D. Antonovich.

== Political career ==
Barger began her career in government in 1988 when she interned in the office of Los Angeles County Supervisor Michael D. Antonovich. By 2001 she had risen up the ranks to become Antonovich's chief of staff.

=== Los Angeles County Board of Supervisors ===
She became a member of the L.A. County Board of Supervisors in December 2016, representing the Fifth District. Her district is the county's largest supervisorial district in area, spanning 2,785 square miles, and includes 20 cities and 83 unincorporated communities in the San Gabriel, San Fernando, Santa Clarita, and Antelope Valleys.

In her role as a county supervisor, Barger has co-authored bills furthering the county’s support for veterans and foster children, as well as modernizing the County's mental health system.

Barger also co-authored motions to address homelessness in LA County, which notably includes a bill passed by the California State Assembly in May 2018 amending the state’s definition of “gravely disabled”, and allowing more state-sponsored medical care to be provided to those who may be suffering from a serious mental illness. Barger also established the County's Blue-Ribbon Commission on Homelessness to identify and correct the structural barriers to solving the County's homelessness crisis.

Barger coauthored a motion creating the Blue Ribbon Commission on Public Safety, which was intended to explore the impact that Assembly Bill 109, California Proposition 47, and California Proposition 57, which were collectively aimed at converting many nonviolent drug offenses into misdemeanors and allowing for the early release of some inmates, has had inside of Los Angeles County. The formation of the commission was a reaction to the murder of police Officer Keith Boyer, and ultimately passed on a 3-0 vote with abstentions. The commission membership at its inception was controversial, with critics citing that many of the 27 members drafted to the commission were directly affected by Proposition 47, coming from roles within the county’s judicial system. Other critics noted that linking the murder of Officer Boyer to the passage of criminal reform efforts was misguided because the error that led to the release of Officer Boyer’s murderer was committed at the county level.

In 2017, Barger was the only opposition in a 4-1 vote to eliminate the "registration fee" that the Los Angeles County Public Defender's office and other court-appointed counsel charge defendants before providing them with legal services.

In 2017, Barger was the only opposition in a 4-1 vote to establish the Business Registration program, which would levy a fee on businesses to create a registry and connect them with county resources.

On December 3, 2019, Barger was elected by a unanimous vote of the Board to become its chair, succeeding Janice Hahn. She chaired the Board for the first year of the COVID-19 pandemic in California in 2020.

==== Housing ====
In 2024, Barger pulled funding for 43 units of senior supportive housing between the boundaries of La Verne and San Dimas. Local NIMBYs had expressed opposition to the housing.

In the aftermath of the January 2025 Southern California wildfires, Barger requested that state housing laws be temporarily waived in Los Angeles County. The state housing laws in question incentivized increases in housing supply. Housing advocates criticized Barger's request, arguing that it would hinder needed housing construction in the aftermath of the fires.

== Electoral history ==
Los Angeles County Board of Supervisors, 5th district, 2020
Primary election
Candidate	Votes	%
Kathryn Barger (incumbent)	240,403	58.75
Darrell Park	84,611	20.68
John Harabedian	84,199	20.58
Total votes	409,213	100.00

Los Angeles County Board of Supervisors, 5th district, 2016
Candidate	Votes	%
Kathryn Barger	105,520	29.64%
Darrell Park	55,185	15.50%
Bob Huff	52,359	14.71%
Ara James Najarian	46,587	13.08%
Mitchell Englander	42,823	12.03%
Elan Carr	40,580	11.40%
Billy Malone	8,701	2.44%
Rajpal Kahlon	4,285	1.20%

Los Angeles County Board of Supervisors, 5th district, runoff 2016
Candidate	Votes	%
Kathryn Barger	350,998	57.90%
Darrell Park	255,165	42.10%

== Personal life ==
Kathryn Barger was born and raised in the 5th District. Barger attended Ohio Wesleyan University in Delaware, Ohio, earning a BA in Communications/Government in 1983. She is married to a retired Sheriff’s deputy and lives in San Marino. Her brother is John M. Barger, who was appointed to the Board of Governors of the United States Postal Service by then-president Donald Trump in 2019. Her late father Richards D. Barger was appointed California Insurance Commissioner by then-Governor Ronald Reagan, serving from 1968 to 1972.
