= Los Angeles County Board of Supervisors =

Five-member governing body of Los Angeles County, California

County of Los Angeles Board of Supervisors

Type
- Type: Unicameral board of Los Angeles County
- Term limits: 3 terms (12 years)

History
- Founded: 1852
- Preceded by: Court of Sessions

Leadership
- County Chair: Hilda Solis since December 2, 2025
- County Chair pro tempore: Holly Mitchell since December 2, 2025

Structure
- Seats: 5
- Political groups: Nonpartisan (5) (de jure); Democratic (4) (de facto); Republican (1) (de facto)
- Length of term: 4 years, three-term limit

Elections
- Voting system: Two-round system
- Last election: November 5, 2024
- Next election: November 3, 2026

Meeting place
- Kenneth Hahn Hall of Administration; Civic Center, Los Angeles, California

Website
- Official website

The Los Angeles County Board of Supervisors (LACBOS) is the governing body of Los Angeles County, California, United States.

The five-member Board was constituted in the middle of the 19th century, when the County population was just a few thousand people. The Board's structure remained largely unchanged even as the County grew to become the United States' most populous, with each supervisor responsible for a district of about 2 million constituents in the 2020s. The Board manages an annual budget of more than $50 billion, and has ultimate control over most aspects of the county's departments, including social services, public works, and the court system. The Board's combination of immense power and minimal oversight is such that the Supervisors are nicknamed the "five little kings"—or in the case of the most recent Board, the "five little queens". Multiple attempts to reform the Board of Supervisors by ballot measure failed in the 20th and early 21st century. In 2024, voters approved Measure G to expand the Board to nine members and create an executive position.

== History ==
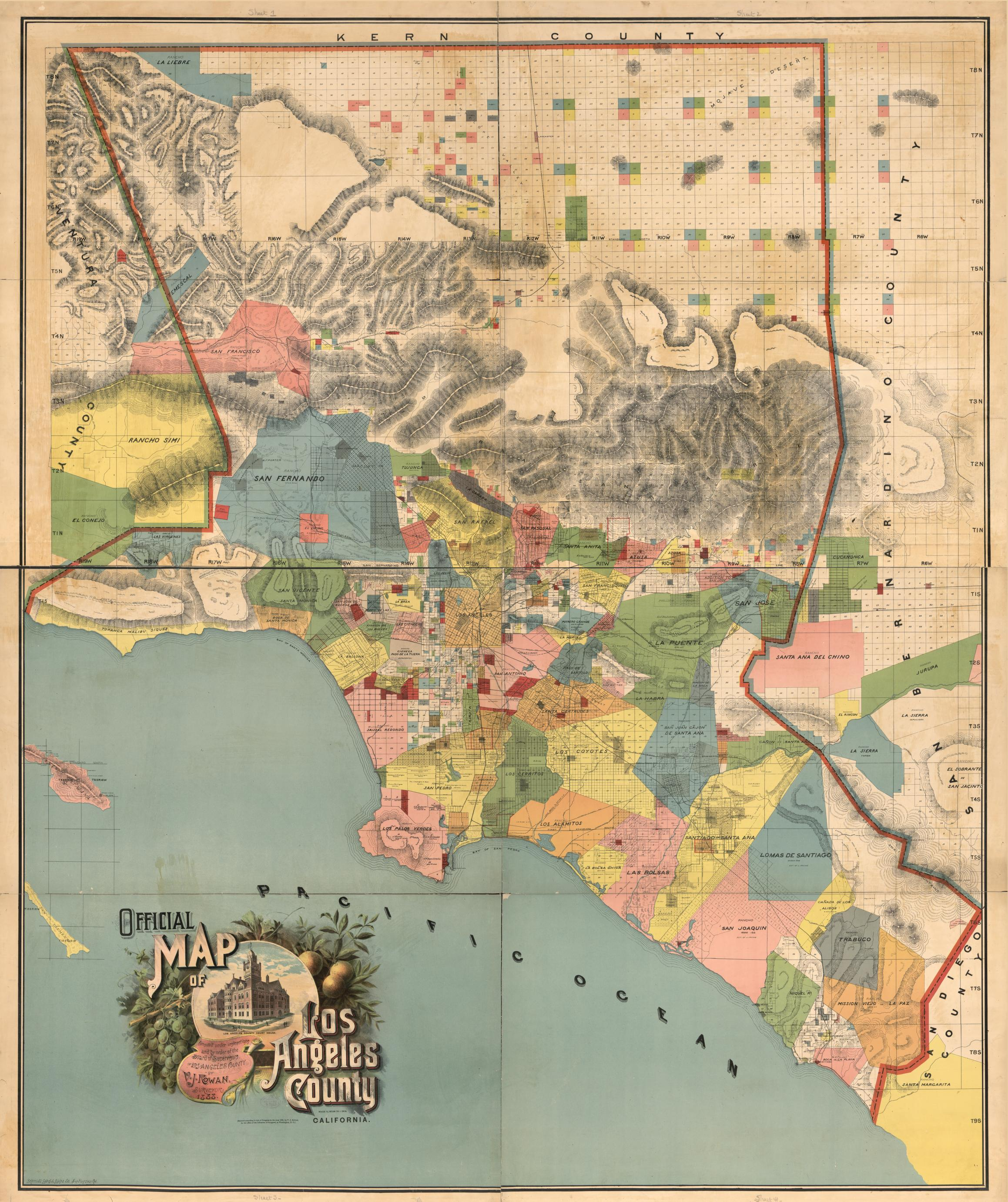
Official map of Los Angeles County, California compiled under instructions and by the order of the Board of Supervisors of Los Angeles County, 1880

On April 1, 1850, the citizens of Los Angeles elected a three-man Court of Sessions as their first governing body. A total of 377 votes were cast in this election. In 1852, the Legislature dissolved the Court of Sessions and created a five-member Board of Supervisors. In 1913 the citizens of Los Angeles County approved a charter recommended by a board of freeholders which gave the County greater freedom to govern itself within the framework of state law.

Los Angeles County did not subdivide into separate counties or increase the number of supervisors as its population soared during the twentieth century. Today, each supervisor represents just under two million people. As a consequence, individual supervisors often exercised substantial influence over the governance of the county, and the group was collectively known as the "five little kings". Efforts to increase the number of supervisors on the board all failed at the ballot box in 1962, 1976, 1992, and 2000.

With the election of Holly Mitchell to the board in 2020, the Board of Supervisors was occupied entirely by women for the first time in its history. Since the "five little kings" nickname was no longer appropriate, the news media began to refer to the board as the "five little queens".

In November 2024, county voters approved Measure G, which required the county to create an independent ethics commission by 2026, hold a direct election for a county executive by 2028 (in lieu of the supervisors' traditional appointment of the County Chief Executive Officer), and begin a redistricting process that would culminate in the election of a nine-member board of supervisors by 2032.

== Governance ==
=== Elections ===
Supervisors are elected to four-year terms by a vote of Los Angeles County citizens who reside in the supervisorial district. Supervisors must reside and be voters in the district they represent. Elections for the 1st and 3rd districts coincide with California's gubernatorial elections, while those for the 2nd, 4th and 5th districts coincide with the United States presidential election. Supervisorial terms begin the first Monday in December after the election.

=== Term limits ===
In March 2002, Los Angeles County voters passed Measure B to limit the supervisors to three consecutive four-year terms. If a supervisor fills a vacancy, the unexpired term counts towards the term limit if there are more than two years (half the term) left to serve. The provisions of the measure were not retroactive, meaning that the term limit clock for supervisors who were serving at the time the measure passed would start with the next election. At the time term limits were imposed, Don Knabe, Michael D. (Mike) Antonovich, and Yvonne Brathwaite Burke’s terms were scheduled to end in 2016 (Brathwaite Burke chose to retire in 2008), while Gloria Molina and Zev Yaroslavsky served their terms until 2014.

=== County Chair or Mayor ===
The chair or “mayor” of the Board of Supervisors serves a term of one year, meaning that a supervisor who is elected for a term on the board will get a chance to serve at least one term as chair/mayor. Upon expiration of the term, the duties of the chair/mayor are rotated among the board members by order of seniority. Along with their general responsibilities as a member of the board of supervisors, the chair/mayor has several unique duties to fulfill, including presiding over board meetings and controlling the agenda of the board. Mike Antonovich, during his tenure as a supervisor, called himself "mayor", a practice that was not continued by subsequent supervisors.

=== CEO ===
Until recently, the chief executive officer was the appointed individual heading the county but had little power as supervisors retained the right to fire and hire department heads and often directly admonished department heads in public.

Based on an ordinance authored by Supervisors Knabe and Yaroslavsky that took effect in April 2007, the CEO directly oversees departments on behalf of the supervisors, although the Los Angeles County Fire Department, Los Angeles County Sheriff's Department, Assessor, District Attorney, Auditor-Controller, and Executive Office of the Board of Supervisors continue to be under the direct purview of the Board of Supervisors. The change was made in response to several candidates either dropping out or declining to accept the position to replace former Chief Administrative Officer David Janssen. Antonovich was the lone supervisor to oppose the change, stating that such a move would lead to a more autocratic form of government and disenfranchise the 1.3 million who live in unincorporated areas.

However, this was rescinded in 2015 and the CEO has returned to a facilitation and coordination role between departments. Departments continue to submit recommendations and agenda items to the Board to be adopted and ratified, and the Board directly manages relations with the department heads instead of going through the CEO, as would be the case in a council-manager system prevalent in most of the county's cities. In 2016, the CEO further recommended, and the Board approved, transferring positions considered "transactional" and focusing the CEO on "strategic" initiatives and long-term, structural issues.

As noted above, the November 2024 approval of Measure G means that by 2028, the county must hold a direct election for the first time for a county executive. This official will have broad mayor-like powers. The county executive will supervise department heads, prepare the budget, and exercise the right to veto board resolutions with which they disagree, and will no longer be appointed by or responsible to the board which would eliminate the CEO office and create the office of county executive.

==== Commissions, committees and boards ====
The Executive Office of the Board of Supervisors (EO) has direct oversight of a total of 34 commissions, committees and boards:

- Audit Committee
- Business License Committee
- City Selection Committee
- Civilian Oversight Commission
- Civil Service Commission
- Commission for Children and Families
- Commission for Women
- Commission on HIV
- Commission on Human Relations
- Commission on Insurance
- Countywide Criminal Justice Coordination Committee
- Economy and Efficiency Commission
- Employee Relations Commission
- Fish and Wildlife Commission
- Historical Landmarks and Records Commission
- Information Systems Advisory Body
- Los Angeles County Redistricting Commission
- Local Government Services Commission
- Los Angeles County Capital Asset Leasing Corporation
- Los Angeles Memorial Coliseum Commission
- Los Angeles Regional Crime Laboratory Facility Authority
- LGBTQ+ Commission
- Prevention and Promotion Systems Governing Committee
- Probation Oversight Commission
- Quality and Productivity Commission
- Redevelopment Oversight Board
- San Fernando Valley Council of Governments
- Sybil Brand Commission for Institutional Inspections
- Tobacco and Securitization
- West Carson Enhanced Infrastructure Financing District Public Financing Authority
- Youth Climate Commission
- Youth Commission

=== Board meetings ===
The Board meets every Tuesday at 9:30 a.m., Pacific Time, at the Board Hearing Room (381B) at the Kenneth Hahn Hall of Administration in Downtown Los Angeles. On Tuesdays following a Monday holiday, Board meetings begin after lunch, at 1:00 p.m. Board meetings are conducted in accordance with Robert's Rules of Order, the Brown Act (California’s sunshine law), and the Rules of the Board. The Chief Executive Officer, the County Counsel and the Executive Officer, or their deputies, attend each Board meeting.

The regular agendas for the first, second, third and fifth Tuesdays of the month are essentially a consent calendar, that is, all items are automatically approved without discussion, unless a Supervisor or member of the public requests discussion of a specific item. The fourth Tuesday of the month is reserved for the purpose of conducting legally required public hearings, Board of Supervisors motions and department items continued from a previous meeting, have time constraints, or are critical in nature. Since Board meetings are considered Brown Act bodies, a Board agenda is published 72 hours before the Board meeting is convened.

At the start of a meeting, after an invocation and the Pledge of Allegiance, all items that do not have "holds" placed on them by a Supervisor or a member of the public, or are mandatory public hearings, are approved on a consent calendar. Following that, presentations of various dignitaries (e.g., local consulate officials, awards to County employees and the general public, and pets for adoption) are made. Then, items that were not approved are called in numerical order unless a supervisor wishes to take items out of order.

Members of the public are allotted three minutes to make public comment on all the agenda items that they intend to discuss. An additional three minutes are provided during general public comment on any topic within the board's jurisdiction. Individuals must submit comment cards before the start of the meeting and wait until their item is called. On popular topics with multiple speakers, comments may be restricted to as little as one minute each, and the board has the discretion to figuratively muzzle anyone who is addressing the board in a disruptive manner.

Weekly Board meetings are broadcast live online and televised on local public television (KLCS Channel 58). Transcripts and statements of proceedings are published online. However, because some Board decisions have major implications, speakers and protesters on behalf of many causes regularly attend the meetings. The county is sued frequently by various public interest law firms and organizations on behalf of people who disagree with the Board's decisions.

== Criticism and controversy ==
=== Board expansion ===
Advocates have long supported the idea of expanding Board membership to reduce the size of each district, and establishing an elected County Executive as a check and balance on the Board's power, but voters have rejected such proposals every time they have appeared on the ballot. Former supervisor Gloria Molina supported expansion of the Board (to potentially increase Hispanic representation), and former supervisor Zev Yaroslavsky supported both Board expansion and the creation of an elected County Executive, much like in King County, Washington. In 2024, County Chair Lindsey Horvath and Supervisor Janice Hahn introduced Measure G, which will increase the size of the Board of Supervisors from five to nine elected members, alongside creating an elected county executive and independent Ethics Commission. On November 12, 2024, LA County voters passed Measure G with 51% of the vote. When the measure becomes effective in 2028, all executive power from the County Chair will go to the new County Executive, with the expanded Board of Supervisors being elected in 2032.

=== Cooperation with ICE agents in jails ===
From 2005 to 2015, the board had a program, known as 287(g), that allowed federal U.S. Immigration and Customs Enforcement agents into county jails to determine whether inmates were in the country legally. After 2015, the board of supervisors and the Los Angeles County Sheriff's Department still cooperate with federal immigration agents.

=== Interim public defender appointment ===
In 2018, the board appointed Nicole Tinkham as interim public defender, despite a letter signed by 390 public defenders who were concerned that Tinkham lacked criminal law experience and the potential for a conflict of interest, given Tinkham’s prior representation of the Los Angeles County Sheriff’s Department. Prior to the appointment, the board had failed to appoint a permanent Public Defender, following the retirement of Ronald Brown. One deputy public defender testified to the board: “I feel like you are making a mockery of my life’s work … clearly somebody failed to think this through.” The American Civil Liberties Union has also criticized the appointment of Tinkham.

=== Racial and political gerrymandering ===
In 1991, a federal court ruled that the board denied Latinos a chance to be elected to the board. The court found that supervisors, all white, purposefully gerrymandered districts so that Latinos were a minority in each of them, a Voting Rights Act violation. As a result, Gloria Molina, the first Latina supervisor, was elected to the board of supervisors.

In 2010, Los Angeles created a nonpartisan commission to impartially redraw the districts for the board of supervisors.”

In 2016, Governor Brown, however, signed Senate Bill 958 which states that “the political party preferences of the commission members…shall be as proportional as possible to the total number of voters who are registered with each political party in the County of Los Angeles.” Some argue that the new bill infringes upon the rights of political minority parties and independent voters.

=== Transparency ===
In 2018, the Los Angeles Times editorial board criticized the board for a lack of transparency and accountability. In early 2015, the board was to discuss and adopt a set of policy priorities and post them on the county's website, together with an explanation of how they would be implemented and a schedule of hearings so the public could weigh in. The Times criticized the board for not following through on that promise.

== Current Supervisors ==
Members of the Board are officially nonpartisan, and are elected by constituents of their respective districts.

District	Name	Party	Start	Next Election
1	Hilda Solis, Chair	Democratic	December 1, 2014	2026 (term-limited)
2	Holly Mitchell, Chair pro tempore	Democratic	December 6, 2020	2028
3	Lindsey Horvath	Democratic	December 5, 2022	2026
4	Janice Hahn	Democratic	December 5, 2016	2028 (term-limited)
5	Kathryn Barger	Republican	December 5, 2016	2028 (term-limited)

== Supervisorial districts ==
Los Angeles County is divided into 5 supervisorial districts (SDs), with each Supervisor representing a district of approximately 2 million people.

District	Supervisor	Population (2011)	Area	Represented cities and unincorporated areas
First	Solis	1,967,029	246 square miles (640 km^{2})	Cities: Alhambra; Azusa; Baldwin Park; Covina; Diamond Bar; El Monte; Industry; Irwindale; La Puente; La Verne (portion); Montebello; Monterey Park; Pomona; Rosemead; San Gabriel; South El Monte; Walnut; West Covina; Whittier (portion); Unincorporated areas; Avocado Heights; Charter Oak; East Los Angeles; Hacienda Heights; Rowland Heights; San Jose Hills; South San Gabriel; Valinda; West Puente Valley; Los Angeles City neighborhoods; Angelino Heights; Atwater Village; Boyle Heights; Chinatown; Civic Center; Downtown Los Angeles; Eagle Rock; East Hollywood; Echo Park; El Sereno; Elysian Park; Elysian Valley; Glassell Park; Highland Park; Historic Filipinotown; Lincoln Heights; Little Armenia; Little Tokyo; Mt. Washington; Pico-Union (portion); Silverlake; Temple-Beaudry; Thai Town; University Hills; Westlake; Wholesale District
Second	Mitchell	1,977,349	162 square miles (420 km^{2})	Cities: Carson; Compton; Culver City; El Segundo; Gardena; Hawthorne; Hermosa Beach; Inglewood; Lawndale; Lynwood; Manhattan Beach; Redondo Beach; Unincorporated areas; Athens; Del Aire; Del Rey; East Rancho Dominguez; El Camino Village; Florence; Florence-Firestone; Ladera Heights; Lennox; Marina del Rey; Rancho Dominguez; West Carson; West Rancho Dominguez; Willowbrook; Windsor Hills; Los Angeles City neighborhoods; Adams-Normandie; Baldwin Hills; Country Club Park; Crenshaw District; Del Rey; Exposition Park; Faircrest Heights; Hancock Park; Harbor Gateway; Harvard Heights; Harvard Park; Hyde Park; Jefferson Park; Koreatown; Lafayette Square; Leimert Park; Little Bangladesh; Manchester Square; Marina Peninsula; Mid-City; Miracle Mile; Palms; Park La Brea; Pico-Union (portion); Playa Del Rey; Playa Vista; South Carthay (portion); South Park; University Park; Venice (portion); Vermont Knolls; Vermont Square; Vermont Vista; Victoria Park; Watts; Wellington Square; West Adams; Westchester; Wilshire Center
Third	Horvath	1,956,453	431 square miles (1,120 km^{2})	Cities; Agoura Hills; Beverly Hills; Calabasas; Hidden Hills; Malibu; San Fernando; Santa Monica; West Hollywood; Westlake Village; Los Angeles City neighborhoods; Arleta; Bel Air; Beverly Crest; Beverlywood; Brentwood; Canoga Park; Canoga Park; Carthay; Century City; Chatsworth; Cheviot Hills; Encino; Granada Hills; Hollywood (portion); Lake Balboa; Mandeville Canyon; Mar Vista; Mission Hills; North Hills; North Hollywood (portion); Northridge; Pacific Palisades; Pacoima; Palisades Highlands; Palms; Panorama City; Porter Ranch; Rancho Park; Reseda; Reynier Village; Sherman Oaks (portion); South Carthay (portion); Studio City (portion); Sun Valley (portion); Sylmar; Toluca Lake; Valley Glen; Van Nuys; Venice; Tarzana; Valley Glen; Van Nuys; Venice (portion); West Hills; West Los Angeles; Westwood; Winnetka; Woodland Hills; Unincorporated areas; Agoura; Malibu Vista; Monte Nido; Seminole Hot Springs; Topanga; Topanga Canyon; VA Hospital
Fourth	Hahn	1,971,639	458 square miles (1,190 km^{2})	Cities; Artesia; Avalon; Bellflower; Cerritos; Commerce; Cudahy; Downey; Hawaiian Gardens; Huntington Park; La Habra Heights; La Mirada; Lakewood; Lomita; Long Beach; Lynwood; Maywood; Norwalk; Palos Verdes Estates; Paramount; Pico Rivera; Rancho Palos Verdes; Rolling Hills; Rolling Hills Estates; Santa Fe Springs; Signal Hill; South Gate; Torrance; Vernon; Whittier; Los Angeles City neighborhoods; Harbor City; San Pedro; Wilmington; Unincorporated areas; Bandini Islands; East La Mirada; East Whittier; La Habra Heights; Palos Verdes Peninsula; San Clemente Island; Santa Catalina Island; South Whittier; Walnut Park; West Whittier/Los Nietos
Fifth	Barger	1,946,135	2,807 square miles (7,270 km^{2})	Cities; Alhambra; Arcadia; Bradbury; Burbank; Claremont; Duarte; Glendale; Glendora; La Cañada Flintridge; La Verne (portion); Lancaster; Monrovia; Palmdale; Pasadena; San Dimas; San Marino; Santa Clarita; Sierra Madre; South Pasadena; Temple City; Los Angeles City neighborhoods; Angeles National Forest; Hollywood Hills (portion); Lakeview Terrace; Los Feliz; North Hollywood (portion); Shadow Hills; Sherman Oaks (portion); Studio City (portion); Sun Valley (portion); Sunland; Toluca Lake; Tujunga; Valley Village; Quartz Hill; Unincorporated areas; Quartz Hill; San Francisquito Canyon; San Pasqual; Sand Canyon; Stevenson Ranch; Sun Village; Universal City; Val Verde; Valencia; Valyermo; Wrightwood; Altadena
