= 2026 Los Angeles mayoral election =

Municipal election in California

- June 2, 2026 (first round); November 3, 2026 (runoff)
- Votes counted: 99% as of November 13, 7:53 PM PST
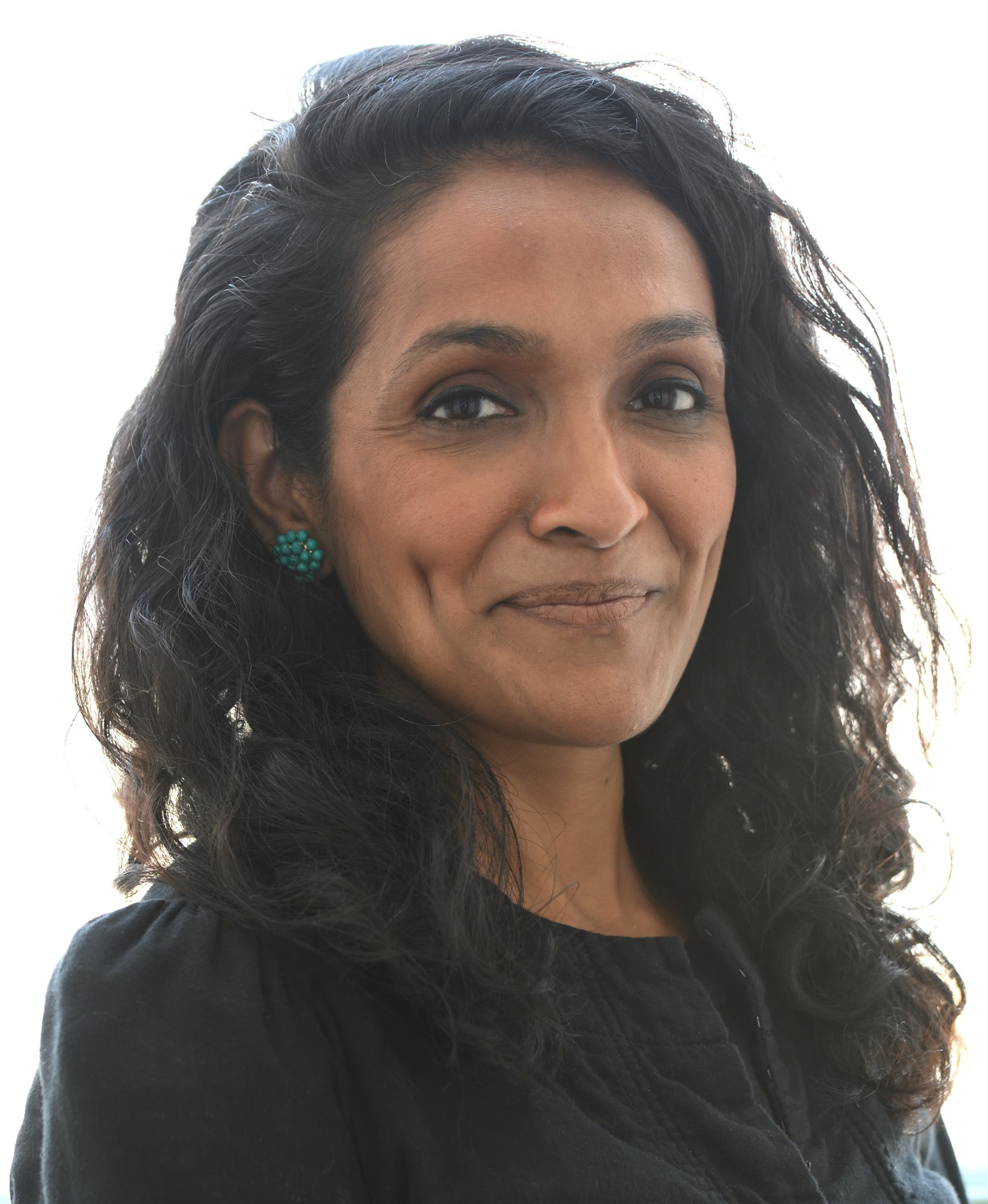

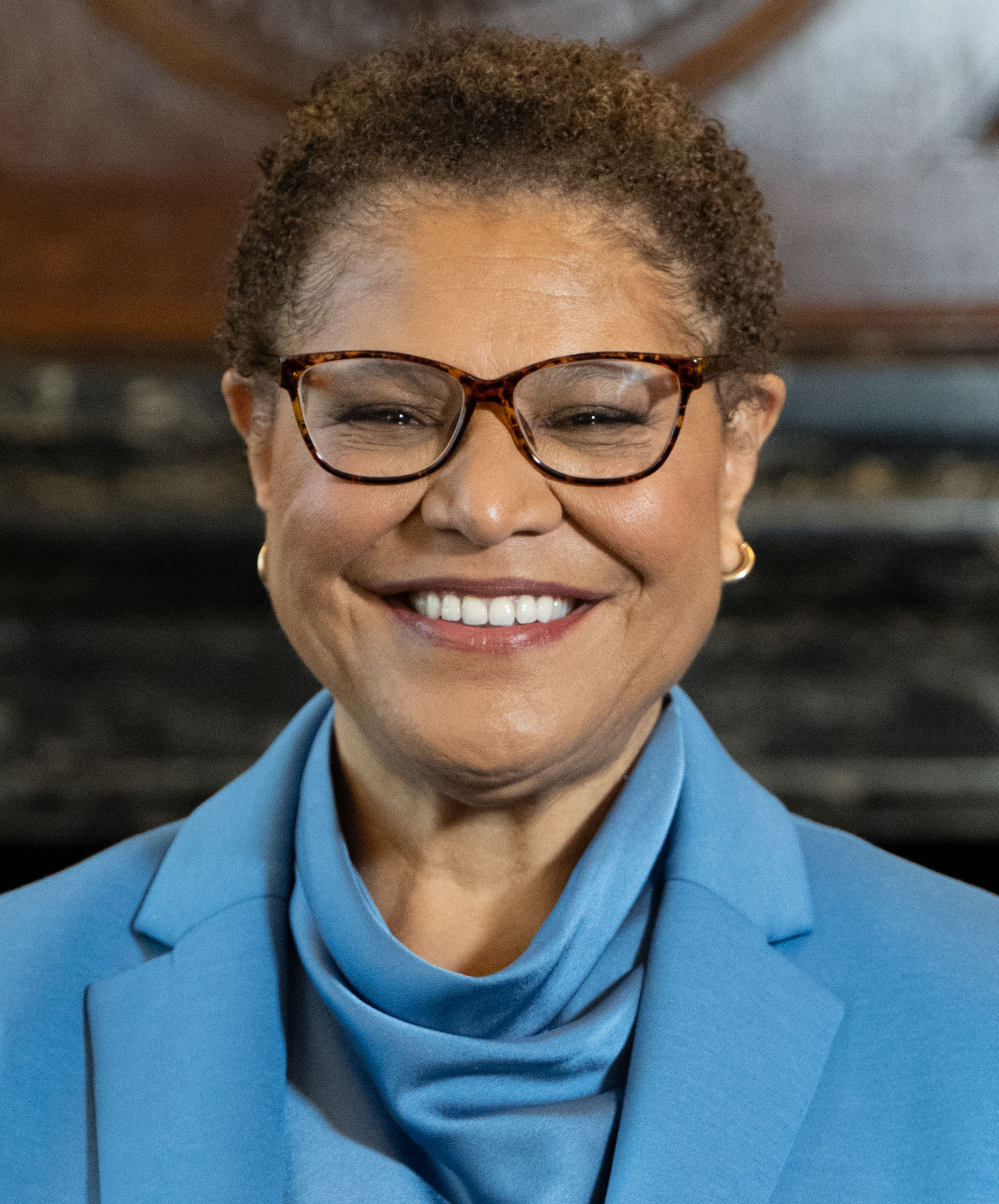

| Candidate | Nithya Raman | Karen Bass | Spencer Pratt |
| First round | 247,781; 29.0% | 292,593; 34.3% | 217,977; 25.5% |
| Runoff | 616,858; 54.9% | 505,871; 45.1% | Eliminated |
Mayor before election
Karen Bass
Elected Mayor
Nithya Raman

The 2026 Los Angeles mayoral election was held on November 3, 2026, to elect the mayor of Los Angeles, California. A nonpartisan top-two primary was held on June 2, 2026. Incumbent mayor Karen Bass announced her re-election bid in July 2024. In the June 8 primary, Bass and city councilmember Nithya Raman advanced to the general election. Raman defeated Bass in the November general election.

== Candidates ==
=== Advanced to runoff ===
- Karen Bass, incumbent mayor (2022–present)
- Nithya Raman, city councilmember from the 4th district (2020–present) and assistant council president pro tempore (2025–2026) (previously endorsed Bass)

=== Eliminated in primary ===
- Bryant Acosta, chief creative officer
- Asaad Alnajjar, Porter Ranch neighborhood councilor and candidate for Los Angeles's 12th City Council district in 2020
- Nelson Cheng, streamer and behavioral interventionist
- Rae Huang, community organizer
- Tish Hyman, singer-songwriter
- Andrew Kim, attorney and candidate for mayor in 2022
- Suzy Kim, mental health professional
- John Logsdon, Westchester/Playa neighborhood councilor
- Juanita Lopez, political scientist
- Adam Miller, former tech executive
- Spencer Pratt, reality television personality
- Andrej Selivra, enterprise technical architect

=== Write-in candidates ===
- Griselda Diaz, administrative manager
- Misael Ortega, painting contractor

=== Disqualified ===
- Adam Carmichael, software systems architect
- Alyxandria-Jamil Carter, artist
- Cassandra Faye Floyd, minister
- Joseph Garcia, gardener and advocate
- Laura Garza, rail worker and perennial candidate
- Robert Goodman, entrepreneur and financial advisor
- Keeldar Shawn Hamilton, transportation coordinator
- Nick Harron, writer
- Stevie Maceo Milan, sales representative
- Vincent Wali, musician and nurse

=== Withdrawn ===
- Austin Beutner, former superintendent of the Los Angeles Unified School District and
  1st Deputy Mayor of Los Angeles
- Jeanne Moller Fontana, mental health activist
- Franziska Von Fischer, real estate investor

=== Declined ===
- Rick Caruso, founder of Caruso and runner-up for mayor in 2022
- Lindsey Horvath, Los Angeles County supervisor (2022–present) (ran for re-election)
- Kenneth Mejia, Los Angeles City controller (2022–present) (ran for re-election)
- Traci Park, city councilmember from the 11th district (2022–present) (ran for re-election)
- Monica Rodriguez, city councilmember from the 7th district (2017–present) (ran for re-election)
- Maryam Zar, founder of the Palisades Recovery Coalition

== Primary ==
Most attention in the non-partisan primary was focused on Bass, the incumbent Democratic mayor; Pratt, a Republican reality television personality; and Raman, a Democratic city councilmember. Pratt had come to renewed prominence by channeling popular resentment against city government for its handling of the Palisades Fire, in which he had lost his home the previous year; he became a focal point of Republican support. Raman, a Democratic Socialists of America member, entered the race only hours before the filing deadline in order to provide an alternate challenger to Pratt; she positioned herself as more progressive than Bass, focusing on the city's housing crisis and other policy areas where she charged that Bass's establishment politics had failed.

=== Debates ===
2026 Los Angeles mayoral election debates
| Date | Host | Moderators | Location | Link | Nonpartisan | Nonpartisan | Nonpartisan |
| Key: P Participant I Invited W Withdrawn A Absent N Not invited | | | | | | | |
| Key: P Participant I Invited W Withdrawn A Absent N Not invited | | | | | Karen Bass | Spencer Pratt | Nithya Raman |
|---|---|---|---|---|---|---|---|
| May 5, 2026 | Sherman Oaks Homeowners Association | Phil Sherman | Sherman Oaks East Valley Adult Center | YouTube | P | N | P |
| May 6, 2026 | NBC4; Telemundo 52 | Enrique Chiabra; Conan Nolan; Colleen Williams | Skirball Cultural Center | YouTube | P | P | P |

==== Canceled debate ====
A third debate was scheduled to occur on May 13, hosted by the League of Women Voters, with five candidates invited. Bass withdrew from the debate a week before, after originally committing to attending. Pratt was also invited to the debate, but declined due to a scheduling conflict. On May 11, Raman withdrew from the debate, leading to its cancellation later that day.

Cancelled 2026 Los Angeles mayoral election debate
| Planned date | Host | Nonpartisan | Nonpartisan | Nonpartisan | Nonpartisan | Nonpartisan |
| Key: P Participant I Invited W Withdrawn A Absent N Not invited | | | | | | |
| Key: P Participant I Invited W Withdrawn A Absent N Not invited | | Karen Bass | Rae Huang | Adam Miller | Spencer Pratt | Nithya Raman |
|---|---|---|---|---|---|---|
| May 13, 2026 | League of Women Voters; Pat Brown Institute | W | I | I | I | W |

=== Endorsements ===
Karen Bass

Executive branch officials

- Kamala Harris, former vice president of the United States (2021–2025)

U.S. senators

- Alex Padilla, California (2021–present)
- Adam Schiff, California (2024–present)

U.S. representatives

- Nancy Pelosi, former speaker of the House (2007–2011, 2019–2023) from CA-11 (1987–present)
- Maxine Waters, CA-43 (1991–present)

Statewide officials

- Rob Bonta, attorney general of California (2021–present)
- Gavin Newsom, governor of California (2019–present)

State legislators

- María Elena Durazo, SD-26 (2018–present)
- Sade Elhawary, AD-57 (2024–present)
- Fabian Nunez, former speaker of the California State Assembly (2004–2008) from AD-46 (2002–2008)

County officials

- Kathryn Barger, Los Angeles County supervisor from the 5th district (2016–present) (Republican)
- Janice Hahn, Los Angeles County supervisor from the 4th district (2018–present)
- Robert Luna, sheriff of Los Angeles County (2022–present)
- Holly Mitchell, Los Angeles County supervisor from the 2nd district (2020–present)
- Hilda Solis, Los Angeles County supervisor from the 1st district (2014–present) and former U.S. secretary of labor (2009–2013)

Local officials

- Marqueece Harris-Dawson, city council president (2024–present) from the 8th district (2015–present)
- Eunisses Hernandez, city councilmember from the 1st district (2022–present)
- Heather Hutt, city councilmember from the 10th district (2022–present)
- Ysabel Jurado, city councilmember from the 14th district (2024–present)
- Tim McOsker, city councilmember from the 15th district (2022–present)
- Adrin Nazarian, city councilmember from the 2nd district (2024–present)
- Curren Price, city councilmember from the 9th district (2013–present)
- ~~Nithya Raman, city councilmember from the 4th district (2020–present)~~ (entered the race in February 2026)
- Hugo Soto-Martinez, city councilmember from the 13th district (2022–present)

Individuals

- J.J. Abrams, filmmaker
- Jasmyne Cannick, political strategist
- Don Cheadle, actor
- Jane Fonda, actress and climate activist
- David Huerta, president of SEIU United Service Workers West
- Dolores Huerta, labor leader
- Samuel L. Jackson, actor
- Magic Johnson, businessman and former basketball player
- Jenifer Lewis, actress and singer
- Angelica Salas, immigration activist

Labor unions

- American Federation of Musicians Local 47
- California Nurses Association
- IATSE California
- ILWU Southern California District Council
- LA/OC Building & Construction Trades Council
- Los Angeles County Federation of Labor
- Los Angeles Police Protective League
- SEIU Local 721

Organizations

- Building Owners and Managers Association Greater Los Angeles
- Coalition for Humane Immigrant Rights of Los Angeles
- Democratic Mayors Association
- Elect Democratic Women
- EMILYs List
- Hollywood Chamber of Commerce
- Los Angeles Area Chamber of Commerce
- Los Angeles County Young Democrats
- Planned Parenthood Los Angeles
- Stonewall Democratic Club
- Valley Industry & Commerce Association

Political parties

- Los Angeles County Democratic Party

Newspapers

- La Opinión
- Los Angeles Sentinel
Rae Huang

Local officials

- Konstantine Anthony, Burbank city councilmember (2020–present)

Labor unions

- United Videogame Workers-CWA
Adam Miller

Newspapers and media

- Beverly Press
- Daily Breeze
- Los Angeles Daily News
- Park La Brea News
- Southern California News Group
- The Orange County Register
Spencer Pratt

Executive branch officials

- Richard Grenell, special presidential envoy for special missions (2025–present)

U.S. senators

- Rick Scott, Florida (2019–present)

Local officials

- Chad Bianco, sheriff-coroner of Riverside County (2019–present)

Individuals

- Adam Carolla, comedian
- Kristin Cavallari, TV personality
- Jonathan Cheban, reality TV personality
- Olivia Culpo, model
- Johnny Devenanzio, TV personality
- Doug Ellin, screenwriter and director
- David Foster, music producer
- Kelsey Grammer, actor
- Paris Hilton, media personality
- Perez Hilton, media personality
- Steve Hilton, former director of strategy to the prime minister of the United Kingdom (2010–2012) and Republican nominee for governor of California in 2026
- Brody Jenner, reality TV personality and model
- Benny Johnson, conservative commentator
- Kaskade, DJ and music producer
- Erika Kirk, chairwoman and CEO of Turning Point USA
- Heather McDonald, actress, comedian and author
- Katharine McPhee, actress
- Wendy Moniz, actress
- Heidi Montag, TV personality and singer (candidate's wife)
- Dennis Quaid, actor
- Joe Rogan, podcaster and comedian
- Rob Schneider, actor and comedian
- Tom Schwartz, TV personality
- Patti Stanger, matchmaker, businesswoman, and TV personality
- Jax Taylor, model and actor
- Nick Viall, actor
- Torrie Wilson, professional wrestler
- James Woods, actor

Newspapers

- California Post
- Las Vegas Review-Journal
- The Santa Clarita Valley Signal
- The Washington Times
Nithya Raman

Executive branch officials

- Jon Favreau, White House Director of Speechwriting (2009–2013)

Individuals

- Hannah Einbinder, actress
- Christopher Lloyd, producer
- Paul Scheer, actor
- Michael Schur, producer and director

Labor unions

- United Auto Workers Region 6

Organizations

- Abundant Housing LA
- New American Leaders Action Fund
- YIMBY Los Angeles

=== Fundraising ===
Campaign finance reports for the primary election
| Candidate | Raised | Matching funds | Spent | Cash on hand | Reported through |
|---|---|---|---|---|---|
| Karen Bass | $3,252,743 | $1,257,000 | $4,509,228 | $24,800 | October 17, 2026 |
| Rae Huang | $322,120 | $612,956 | $767,778 | $24,509 | June 30, 2026 |
| Adam Miller | $4,285,242 | — | $4,163,870 | $175,918 | June 30, 2026 |
| Spencer Pratt | $3,996,187 | — | $3,737,543 | $98,818 | June 30, 2026 |
| Nithya Raman | $1,015,075 | $1,257,000 | $2,355,691 | $3,306 | October 17, 2026 |

=== Polling ===
| Poll source | Date(s) administered | Sample size (Note: Key: A – all adults RV – registered voters LV – likely voters V – unclear) | Margin of error | Karen Bass | Spencer Pratt | Nithya Raman | Adam Miller | Rae Huang | Other | Undecided |
|---|---|---|---|---|---|---|---|---|---|---|
| Berkeley IGS (Note: Poll sponsored by the Los Angeles Times) | May 19–24, 2026 | 1,351 (LV) | ± 3.0% | 26% | 22% | 25% | 5% | 9% | – | 10% |
| Cygnal (R) | May 15–18, 2026 | 500 (LV) | ± 4.4% | 25% | 22% | 18% | 5% | 5% | – | 25% |
| David Binder Research (D) (Note: Poll sponsored by Bass's campaign) | May 2026 | – | – | 38% | 22% | 24% | – | – | – | 16% |
| Emerson College (Note: Poll sponsored by Inside California Politics) | May 9–10, 2026 | 1,000 (LV) | ± 3.0% | 35% (Note: With voters who lean towards a given candidate) | 23% | 23% | 12% | 5% | 3% (Note: "Someone else" with 3%) | – |
| Emerson College | May 9–10, 2026 | 1,000 (LV) | ± 3.0% | 30% | 22% | 19% | 7% | 4% | 0% (Note: "Someone else" with 0%) | 16% |
| UCLA | March 15–29, 2026 | 813 (LV) | ± 4.0% | 25% | 11% | 9% | 3% | 3% | 9% | 40% |
| Berkeley IGS | March 9–15, 2026 | 840 (LV) | – | 25% | 14% | 17% | 6% | 8% | 4% | 26% |
| Emerson College | March 7–9, 2026 | 1,000 (RV) | ± 5.2% | 20% | 10% | 9% | 4% | 3% | 3% (Note: "Someone else" with 3%) | 51% |

=== Results ===
At the end of election night, Bass led with a plurality of votes, followed by Pratt with Raman in third, with only a fraction of ballots tabulated. Over the next week, the additional tabulation of ballots narrowed the gap between Raman and Pratt, and the former eventually overtook the latter in vote totals. With 93% of the vote tabulated on 8 June, election observers concluded that Bass and Raman advanced to a runoff election, with Pratt and all other candidates eliminated.

California's practice of incrementally counting ballots and broadcasting updates in daily batches triggered election conspiracists, including President Donald Trump. In one batch update, a 41-second delay in the electronic broadcast of Pratt's vote totals relative to Bass's and Raman's led to claims of election fraud. The LA County registrar's office confirmed to the Los Angeles Times that Pratt had received additional votes in every batch of updates during the count, a fact with which the Trump-appointed US attorney Bill Essayli concurred. The Sunday after the election, Pratt suggested that 43,000 homeless people had inappropriately cast ballots for Raman. On the same day, Trump shut down an interview with Kristen Welker when she asked him to substantiate his claims of election fraud. Federal House Speaker Mike Johnson also made insinuations of electoral fraud that he was unwilling to substantiate, saying that fraud was "impossible to prove" but could be detected "instinctively".

As of June 9, 2026, Pratt had yet to concede the race or fulfill his vow to leave Los Angeles if not elected. On June 11, Pratt asked online, "Are they done counting yet?"; the Associated Press estimated that by that point, 99% of the ballots had been counted and Pratt had received 25.5% of the votes compared to Raman's 29%. On his syndicated television program, Los Angeles comedian Jimmy Kimmel announced that he had rented a moving truck on behalf of Pratt. On June 12, Pratt released a video announcing that he was no longer encumbered by a campaign, and that "Angelenos are now stuck with two morons responsible for all their problems and now have to choose between dumb and dumber", apparently referring to Bass and Raman; independent observers interpreted the video as a concession. Pratt also indicated he would not fulfill his vow to leave Los Angeles.

Primary results by precinct: Bass: 20–30%; 30–40%; 40–50%; 50–60%; 60–70%; 70–80%; 80–90%; >90%; Raman: 20–30%; 30–40%; 40–50%; 50–60%; 60–70%; 70–80%; 80–90%; >90%; Pratt: 30–40%; 40–50%; 50–60%; 60–70%; 70–80%; 80–90%; >90%

2026 Los Angeles mayoral election
| Candidate | Votes | % |
|---|---|---|
| Karen Bass (incumbent) | 292,593 | 34.3 |
| Nithya Raman | 247,781 | 29.0 |
| Spencer Pratt | 217,977 | 25.5 |
| Adam Miller | 30,008 | 3.5 |
| Rae Chen Huang | 25,220 | 3.0 |
| Juanita Lopez | 13,032 | 1.5 |
| Andrew Kim | 6,988 | 0.8 |
| Suzy Kim | 6,051 | 0.7 |
| Assad Alnajjar | 4,063 | 0.5 |
| Bryant Acosta | 3,470 | 0.4 |
| John Logsdon | 3,029 | 0.4 |
| Tish Hyman | 1,640 | 0.2 |
| Andrej Selivra | 1,159 | 0.1 |
| Nelson Cheng | 881 | 0.1 |
| Total votes | 853,892 | 100.0 |

== Runoff ==
The elimination of Pratt and other candidates set up a runoff election in which Raman challenged the incumbent Bass from the left. While both candidates are Democrats, Raman is also a member of the Democratic Socialists of America, and its Los Angeles chapter endorsed her on September 2. Interviewed at the end of September, Bass continued to be haunted by the Palisades Fire and the 2026 Boyle Heights warehouse fire, while Raman was criticized for a previous appearance with left-wing commentator Hasan Piker. At a forum in South LA, the two agreed that the Los Angeles Homeless Services Authority had failed in its mission and should be jettisoned. Raman criticized Bass for being insufficiently aggressive in supporting housing densification; Bass did not support SB 79, which mandates multifamily housing construction near rail transit.

Mandated financing disclosures at the end of September, which included some contributions from before the primary election, revealed that Raman's campaign had received $3 million from a hedge fund manager who wants more bicycle lanes, and $3 million from the Western States Regional Council of Carpenters, who felt spurned by the wage terms in one of Bass's previous housing directives. Bass's campaign had received part of a $4 million contribution from Airbnb, which was currently in litigation with the city over alleged price gouging after the Palisades and Eaton Fires. The Los Angeles Police Department union spent $3 million to oppose Raman and several other candidates.

=== Post-primary endorsements ===
Karen Bass

Statewide officials

- Fiona Ma, treasurer of California (2019–present)

Individuals

- Anthony Anderson, actor and television host
- Cedric the Entertainer, actor and comedian
- Yvette Nicole Brown, actress

Individuals

- Rick Caruso, founder of Caruso

Organizations

- Black Economic Alliance PAC

Newspapers

- The Korea Daily
Nithya Raman

County officials

- Lindsey Horvath, Los Angeles County supervisor from the 3rd district (2022–present)

Local officials

- Rick Cole, member of the Pasadena City Council (2024–present) and former deputy mayor of Los Angeles (2013–2015)
- Laura Chick, former city controller of Los Angeles (2001–2009)
- Kenneth Mejia, city controller of Los Angeles (2022–present)
- Bernard C. Parks, former city councilmember from the 8th district (2003–2015) and chief of the Los Angeles Police Department (1997–2002)

Individuals

- David Hogg, co-founder of March for Our Lives and former vice chair of the Democratic National Committee
- Mindy Kaling, actress
- Adam Scott, actor

Labor unions

- Committee of Interns and Residents
- Engineers and Architects Association
- Transport Workers Union of America
- Transportation Communications Union/IAM
- UNITE HERE Local 11
- Western States Regional Council of Carpenters
- Writers Guild of America West

Organizations

- California Environmental Voters
- Council on American-Islamic Relations
- Food and Water Action
- Gen-Z for Change
- Los Angeles Democratic Socialists of America
- Los Angeles League of Conservation Voters
- Our Revolution
- Sierra Club Angeles Chapter
- Sunrise Movement

Political parties

- California Working Families Party

=== Fundraising ===
Campaign finance reports for the runoff election as of October 17, 2026
| Candidate | Raised | Matching funds | Spent | Cash on hand |
|---|---|---|---|---|
| Karen Bass | $1,991,461 | $1,446,697 | $2,786,034 | $632,333 |
| Nithya Raman | $1,505,815 | $1,507,000 | $1,692,227 | $1,378,319 |

=== Polling ===
| Poll source | Date(s) administered | Sample size | Margin of error | Karen Bass | Nithya Raman | Other | Undecided |
|---|---|---|---|---|---|---|---|
| Berkeley IGS | October 19–25, 2026 | 2,197 (LV) | ± 3% | 40% | 40% | — | 19% |
| McLaughlin & Associates (R) (Note: Poll sponsored by the California Post) | October 15–18, 2026 | 400 (LV) | — | 39% | 47% | — | 14% |
| Impact Research (D) (Note: Poll sponsored by Estamos con Nithya for Mayor of LA 2026, which supports Raman) | October 2–7, 2026 | 773 (LV) | — | 33% | 43% | — | 23% |
| FM3 Research (D) (Note: Poll sponsored by United Firefighters of Los Angeles City Local 112) | September 25 – October 5, 2026 | 594 (LV) | — | 33% | 35% | — | 19% |
| Manhattan Institute | September 24 – October 1, 2026 | 449 (LV) | ± 4.6% | 36% (Note: With voters who lean towards a given candidate) | 39% | 15% (Note: "Neither/would not vote" with 15%) | 10% |
| Manhattan Institute | September 24 – October 1, 2026 | 449 (LV) | ± 4.6% | 32% | 38% | — | — |
| FM3 Research (D) (Note: Poll sponsored by the Central City Association, which supports Bass) | September 21–28, 2026 | 809 (LV) | — | 35% | 39% | — | 25% |
| Berkeley IGS | September 15–20, 2026 | 2,150 (LV) | ± 3% | 28% | 39% | — | 33% |
| Hart Research Associates (D) (Note: Poll sponsored by Raman's campaign) | September 1–9, 2026 | 600 (LV) | ± 4.1% | 39% | 44% | — | 17% |
| Impact Research (D) (Note: Poll sponsored by Estamos con Nithya for Mayor of LA 2026 and the Western States Regional Council of Carpenters, which support Raman) | August 28 – September 3, 2026 | 700 (LV) | ± 3.7% | 38% | 37% | — | 26% |
| Tavern Research (D) (Note: Poll was sponsored by Streets for All PAC, which supports Raman) | August 20–25, 2026 | 2,258 (LV) | ± 3% | 47% | 53% | — | — |
| Tavern Research (D) | August 20–25, 2026 | 2,258 (LV) | ± 3% | 32% | 38% | — | 30% |
| David Binder Research (D) | August 2026 | — | — | 35% | 33% | — | 24% |
| Tulchin Research (D) (Note: Poll sponsored by Neighborhoods for a Better L.A., which supports Bass) | August 2026 | 1,200 (LV) | ± 2.8% | 41% | 35% | — | 24% |
| | June 2, 2026 | Bass and Raman advance to runoff | | | | | |
| Berkeley IGS | May 19–24, 2026 | 1,913 (RV) | ± 3% | 28% | 32% | 25% (Note: "Neither" with 25%) | 15% |

Hypothetical runoff polling

Karen Bass vs. Spencer Pratt

| Poll source | Date(s) administered | Sample size | Margin of error | Karen Bass | Spencer Pratt | Other | Undecided |
|---|---|---|---|---|---|---|---|
| Berkeley IGS | May 19–24, 2026 | 1,913 (RV) | ± 3% | 47% | 22% | 12% (Note: "Neither" with 12%) | 12% |

Spencer Pratt vs. Nithya Raman

| Poll source | Date(s) administered | Sample size | Margin of error | Spencer Pratt | Nithya Raman | Other | Undecided |
|---|---|---|---|---|---|---|---|
| Berkeley IGS | May 19–24, 2026 | 1,913 (RV) | ± 3% | 28% | 45% | 11% (Note: "Neither" with 11%) | 16% |

==== False polling from Median Strategies ====
Median Strategies was a company that initially described itself as a pollster, and then as a "short term social experiment" after repeated media inquiries. In August 2026, it released the purported results of a public opinion poll for the Los Angeles mayoral runoff election, before retracting its release days later, stating that "[a]ll previously published polling releases have been withdrawn and should not be cited or treated as genuine polling data". The false polling data stated that Karen Bass led Nithya Raman by 12 percentage points, and for the Democratic primary of the Wisconsin gubernatorial election, it stated that Francesca Hong led by 20 percentage points.

The company acknowledged to reporters that the data was false, and following its admission, declared on August 17, 2026, that it was shutting down. In a written statement, the company said "Median Strategies was created as a short term social experiment to examine how purported polling information could enter and spread through the political information ecosystem without independent verification", but contemporaneous reporting did not indicate whether this sequence of events was the company's plan all along, or whether any survey research had ever been conducted by the company.

Median Strategies released a statement on its website claiming "no individual involved held or traded any position in an election prediction market, betting market, or other financial instrument tied to the races covered by Median Strategies". The Associated Press evaluated the effect of the company's statements on betting markets and found that prediction markets saw small changes in price and significant numbers of trades in the 15 minutes immediately following the release of false polling data for the mayoral runoff election.

Bass's campaign had initially celebrated the poll results, but after the revelation Bass called for prosecutions. Raman's campaign criticized Bass's outfit for having initially promoted the so-called poll without vetting it.

It was later revealed that Median Strategies was created by 21-year-old Rahil Prakash, who was inspired to create it when Abdul El-Sayed won the Democratic primary for the Michigan Senate election by a smaller margin than expected. Prakash wanted to test the pervasiveness of fake polls, and used artificial intelligence to create the website of Median Strategies. Prakash subsequently apologized to the campaigns of Bass, Raman, and Hong.

=== Debates ===
2026 Los Angeles mayoral election runoff debates
| Date | Host | Moderators | Location | Link | Nonpartisan | Nonpartisan |
| Key: P Participant I Invited W Withdrawn A Absent N Not invited | | | | | | |
| Key: P Participant I Invited W Withdrawn A Absent N Not invited | | | | | Karen Bass | Nithya Raman |
|---|---|---|---|---|---|---|
| Aug. 19, 2026 | Sherman Oaks Homeowners Association | Phil Shuman | Sherman Oaks East Valley Adult Center | YouTube | P | P |
| Oct. 13, 2026 | NBC4; Telemundo 52 | Colleen Williams; Conan Nolan; Alejandra Ortiz | Universal City | YouTube | P | P |

==== Forums ====
2026 Los Angeles mayoral election runoff forums
| Date | Host | Moderators | Location | Link | Nonpartisan | Nonpartisan |
| Key: P Participant I Invited W Withdrawn A Absent N Not invited | | | | | | |
| Key: P Participant I Invited W Withdrawn A Absent N Not invited | | | | | Karen Bass | Nithya Raman |
|---|---|---|---|---|---|---|
| Sep. 29, 2026 | Jewish Federation Los Angeles | Alex Cohen | Skirball Cultural Center | YouTube | P | P |

=== Results ===
2026 Los Angeles mayoral election runoff
| Candidate | Votes | % |
|---|---|---|
| Nithya Raman | 615,264 | 54.9 |
| Karen Bass (incumbent) | 504,959 | 45.1 |
| Total votes | 1,120,223 | 100.0 |

== Aftermath and reactions ==
=== Results and analysis ===
Nithya Raman won the November 3rd runoff, defeating incumbent mayor Karen Bass, with the election called for Raman on 5 November. With 99 percent of the votes counted, Raman leads Bass by 9.8 P.P. (54.9 - 45.1) a larger margin of victory than pre-election polls had anticipated which showed a tightening of the race, with both candidates each on 40 percent of the vote. Bass's defeat was the first such result for an incumbent mayor of Los Angeles in 21 years. Pre-election analysts attributed Bass's low polling numbers to perceived failures by the incumbent mayor on housing affordability, rising homelessness, Bass's relationship with the city's police force and unions, such as the Los Angeles Police Protective League, which made significant monetary contributions to Bass's campaign after spending almost $2 million on attack-ads against Bass in her initial run for mayor, and the Palisades Wildfires that took place in early 2025, where the incumbent's absence during the outbreak on a state visit to Ghana and the lengthy rebuilding process that affected displaced residents hurt her approval ratings. Raman's victory came despite the near-unanimous support Bass received from members of the L.A. City Council. Los Angeles City Controller Kenneth Mejia was Raman's sole endorsement among Los Angeles city elected officials.

Bass attributed the result to a nationwide anti-incumbency "change wave" against establishment candidates. The age of the electorate was a crucial factor in determining their voting intention, with a wide gap between younger voters who backed Raman and voters over 50, who provided the majority of Bass's support, with race and geography not playing much of a role. A separate Los Angeles Times analysis reported a significant shift in Hispanic support between the first and second round of the election, where many Latino-majority neighbourhoods such as South L.A., Eastside, Pico-Union and Wilmington swung sharply to Raman after Bass had widely prevailed in 35 Latino-majority neighbourhoods in the first round of the election, with Raman trailing on 7.

Although outlets such as Politico attributed much of Bass's defeat to her handling of the Palisades Wildfires, Bass prevailed in all three Pacific Palisades precincts with wide margins over Raman, which Palisades Recovery Coalition head Maryam Zar ascribed to the support of a local city councilmember, Traci Park, for Bass's candidacy, swaying the voting intention of the neighbourhood in Bass's favour. As one of the politically moderate neighbourhoods of Los Angeles, the Pacific Palisades was where the Los Angeles Police Protective League campaign relayed a message of public safety, with strong showings for the incumbent mayor relative to the rest of the city according to union spokesman Saggau, despite the prevailing unpopularity of Bass in the aftermath of the wildfires.

=== Reactions and aftermath ===
Mayor-elect Raman is the first South Asian and Indian-American mayor of Los Angeles. The election also marked the first time that the two largest U.S. cities by population, New York and L.A., will be led by Democratic Socialists of America-aligned mayors, along with U.S. capital Washington D.C., following Zohran Mamdani and Janeese Lewis George's election victories in the 2025 New York City mayoral election and the 2026 Washington, D.C., mayoral election. President Donald Trump commented on the election and the nationwide mayoral results, stating that "If you go by history, it's going to be a disaster."

Bass pledged to ensure a "smooth and seamless transition", and wished Nithya Raman "the best of wishes" and that "the voters made a decision and democracy prevails". Raman's mayoral win will create a vacant seat in Council District 4, with the mayor-elect, 30 neighbourhood leaders, and seven city council members supporting the process of holding a special election rather than an appointment by L.A. City Council members to fill the vacancy.

== See also ==
- 2026 Los Angeles elections
- 2026 Los Angeles County elections
  - 2026 Los Angeles County Board of Supervisors election
- 2026 California elections
  - 2026 California gubernatorial election
- 2026 United States local elections

== Notes ==
Partisan clients
