= Killing of Dijon Kizzee =

2020 fatal police shooting in Westmont, California

- Date: August 31, 2020
- Time: 3:15 pm
- Location: 1200 block of West 109th Place, Westmont, California
- Type: Shooting
- Participants: Los Angeles County Sheriff's Department
- Deaths: Dijon Kizzee
- Charges: none

Dijon Kizzee (February 5, 1991 – August 31, 2020), an African-American man, was shot and killed in the Los Angeles County community of Westmont on August 31, 2020, by deputies of the Los Angeles County Sheriff's Department (LASD). For days, protesters gathered outside the South Los Angeles sheriff's station. By September 6, those demonstrations had escalated to clashes, with deputies firing projectiles and tear gas at the crowds and arresting 35 people over four nights of unrest.

== Death ==
Two deputies were on patrol in the Westmont neighborhood on August 31, 2020, around 3:15pm. The deputies tried to stop Kizzee, 29, for committing a traffic violation on his bike; Kizzee was riding his bicycle on the wrong side of the road and splitting traffic.

Kizzee allegedly dropped the bike and ran a block while holding a jacket and other clothing before deputies caught him. During an encounter with two deputies, Kizzee dropped "a 9mm semi-automatic pistol wrapped in a piece of clothing. He then bent over and reached back to pick up the pistol when each deputy fired, striking Kizzee several times in the torso". The recovered pistol had been reported stolen in 2017.

On September 2, the Kizzee family lawyer posted "a grainy cell phone video footage recorded from a house that purportedly shows the deputies pursuing Kizzee. It shows him walking away from the officers before one closes in on him. Kizzee appears to bend over before the deputy backs up rapidly and opens fire." Kizzee was shot around 16 times and then handcuffed.

== Investigation ==
Video from a nearby surveillance camera was inconclusive, as a wall partially blocked the camera's view. There was no body cam footage as the Department's first body cameras were scheduled to be in service the next month.

On September 4, Los Angeles County Inspector General Max Huntsman was blocked from attending the autopsy of Kizzee. Huntsman told an emergency town hall meeting of the Civilian Oversight Commission that he had asked sheriff's officials to observe the proceedings. On September 8, the Sheriff's Department requested a "security hold" on the autopsy. A security hold typically involves the autopsy not being released to the public until after law enforcement has concluded its investigation. The department said it was worried that releasing the information in the midst of the investigation could taint witnesses' stories. The autopsy conducted on September 2 indicated that Kizzee was shot sixteen times, including gunshot wounds to his head, torso and back. The manner of death was ruled a homicide.

== Reactions ==
Kizzee's family retained civil rights attorney Benjamin Crump, who has represented families of individuals shot by police, such as Jacob Blake’s family from Kenosha, Wisconsin.

Relatives of Kizzee joined other families of people killed by Los Angeles sheriff's deputies to demand a state investigation of the department, claiming the department was rife with corruption. Kizzee's cousin, Jaime Kizzee, alleged that deputies, "...hunted my cousin, and the sheriff's department shot him nineteen times." A community activist, Najee Ali, echoed these beliefs while speaking for the family, stating that Kizzee had been racially profiled and harassed by the officers. Ali said that the Kizzee family and community leaders felt that Sheriff Alex Villanueva should resign his position.

== Protests ==
=== August ===
==== August 31 ====
Immediately after the shooting, hundreds of Black Lives Matter protesters gathered at the shooting scene and then marched to the police station, where they remained into early next morning. Vandalism was reported, but no violence nor arrests. Protesters also spray-painted inflammatory messages outside the station.

=== September ===
==== September 4 ====
A protest, which began at 4pm and quickly swelled to 200-300 people, called for law-enforcement agencies to be defunded and asked attendees to vote Los Angeles County District Attorney Jackie Lacey out of office. Police fired at least three nonlethal warning shots at 8:30pm, but no one appeared to have breached the line. A spokesperson with the Sheriff's Office said protesters started throwing rocks and bottles at deputies. By 8:43pm, police declared the crowd an unlawful assembly and gave protesters ten minutes to disperse.

==== September 6 ====
Twelve protesters, including two minors, were arrested when demonstrations turned violent. According to police, the protesters threw chunks of concrete, bricks and rocks. Protesters wearing helmets and carrying shields also launched mortars at the deputies, according to a police spokesperson. No injuries nor property damage was reported.

==== September 7 ====
Protests turned chaotic when deputies fired several nonlethal projectiles into the crowd. The protests occurred outside the South Los Angeles sheriff's station. Videos showed protesters running for cover as shots rang out and smoke filled the air. No one was injured but six people were arrested.

==== September 8 ====
Another 17 protesters were arrested after an "unlawful assembly" notice was issued around 8:15pm. There were no reported injuries. Several protestors and journalists were hit with projectiles. One journalist was hospitalized from injuries sustained during an arrest after being hit 3 times with rubber bullets.

==== September 12 ====
About 200 people marched from where Kizzee was shot to a location near the South Los Angeles Sheriff's Station to protest, while chanting "Put down your riot gear. I don't see no riot here.". After the group marched back to the shooting location, speakers addressed the crowd, including relatives of Kizzee and Anthony Weber, a 16-year-old shot and killed by police in 2018.

== See also ==
- 2020–2021 United States racial unrest
- 2020 George Floyd Protests
