= 2026 Los Angeles County Board of Supervisors election =

2026 Los Angeles County Board of Supervisors elections
- June 2, 2026

2 out of 5 seats of the Los Angeles County Board of Supervisors 3 seats needed for a majority
	Majority party	Minority party
Party	Democratic	Republican
Seats before	4	1
Seats won	2	0
Seats after	4	1
Seat change	Steady	Steady

The 2026 Los Angeles County Board of Supervisors election took place on June 2, 2026, in Los Angeles County, California. Two of the five seats on the board were up for election in four-year terms. Municipal elections in California are officially nonpartisan; candidates' party affiliations do not appear on the ballot.

Incumbent supervisor Lindsey Horvath won re-election and María Elena Durazo also won in an outright, negating the need for a runoff. This was the second consecutive election cycle without a second round of voting.

== District 1 ==
2026 Los Angeles County Board of Supervisors election District 1

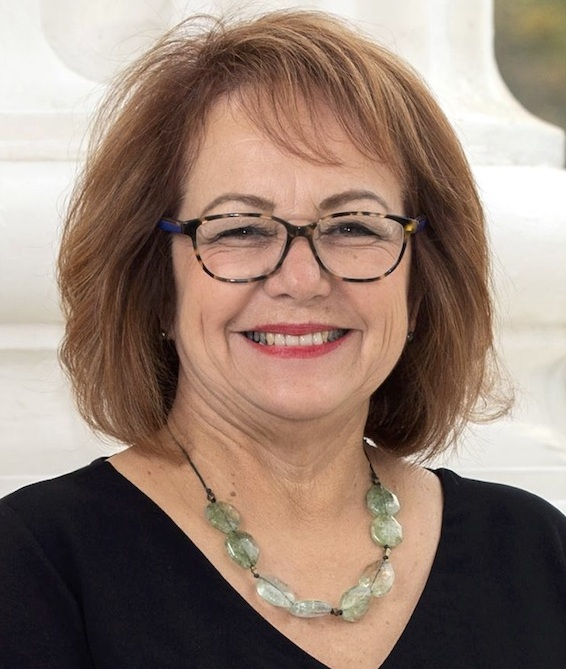

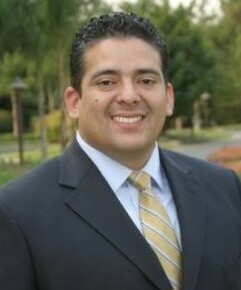
Candidate	María Elena Durazo	Elaine Alaniz	David Argudo
Popular vote	184,974	41,306	29,095
Percentage	60.6%	13.5%	9.5%
Candidate	Noel Almario	Annabella Figueroa Mazariegos
Popular vote	29,058	20,887
Percentage	9.5%	6.8%
Supervisor before election
Hilda Solis
Elected Supervisor
María Elena Durazo

The first supervisorial district contains Downtown, Northeast Los Angeles and Eastside Los Angeles, parts of the San Gabriel Valley, and the eastern Pomona Valley. It includes the cities of Montebello, Pomona, West Covina, El Monte and Alhambra. Incumbent supervisor Hilda Solis was term-limited and ineligible to run for re-election.

=== Candidates ===
==== Declared ====
- Elaine Alaniz, disaster recovery specialist
- Noel Almario, women's health advocate
- David Argudo, La Puente city councilor and candidate for this district in 2022
- María Elena Durazo, state senator from the 26th district

=== Endorsements ===
Elaine Alaniz

Organizations

- Los Angeles County Republican Party
María Elena Durazo

Organizations

- Los Angeles County Democratic Party
- Stonewall Democrats
- Working Families Party

Labor unions

- Los Angeles County Federation of Labor

=== Results ===
2026 Los Angeles County Board of Supervisors District 1 election
Candidate	Votes	%
María Elena Durazo	184,974	60.58
Elaine Alaniz	41,306	13.53
David Argudo	29,095	9.53
Noel Almario	29,058	9.52
Annabella Figueroa Mazariegos	20,887	6.84
Total votes	305,320	100.00

== District 3 ==
2026 Los Angeles County Board of Supervisors election District 3

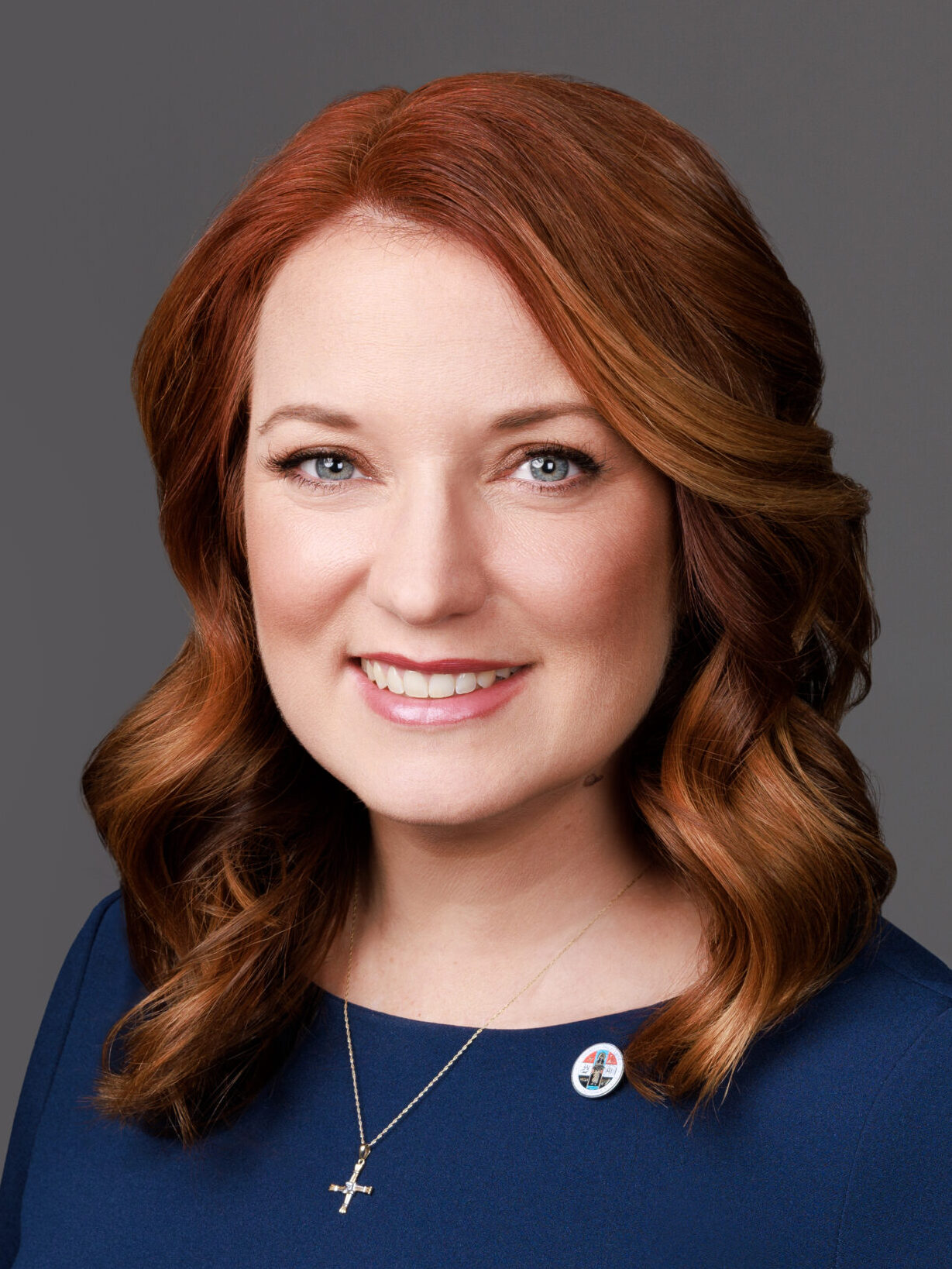

Candidate	Lindsey Horvath	Tonia Arey
Popular vote	276,973	50,340
Percentage	66.4%	16.3%
Candidate	Carmenlina Minasyan	Tomás Sidenfaden
Popular vote	25,930	23,813
Percentage	9.2%	8.2%
Supervisor before election
Lindsey Horvath
Elected Supervisor
Lindsey Horvath

The third supervisorial district covers the western areas of the county, encapsulating the Westside, Santa Monica Mountains, and San Fernando Valley. It includes the cities of Santa Monica, West Hollywood, and Beverly Hills. Incumbent supervisor Lindsey Horvath is eligible to run for re-election to a second term. She was first elected in 2022 with 52.2% of the vote.

=== Candidates ===
==== Declared ====
- Tonia Arey, real estate agent
- Lindsey Horvath, incumbent supervisor
- Carmenlina Minasyan, reforms advocate
- Tomás Sidenfaden, software engineer

=== Endorsements ===
Tonia Arey

Organizations

- Los Angeles County Republican Party
Lindsey Horvath

Organizations

- Los Angeles County Democratic Party
- Stonewall Democrats
- Working Families Party

Labor unions

- Los Angeles County Federation of Labor

=== Results ===
2026 Los Angeles County Board of Supervisors District 3 election
Candidate	Votes	%
Lindsey Horvath (incumbent)	276,973	66.35
Tonia Arey	67,966	16.28
Carmenlina Minasyan	38,482	9.22
Tomás Sidenfaden	34,046	8.16
Total votes	417,467	100.00

== See also ==
- 2026 Los Angeles County elections
- 2026 Los Angeles elections
- 2026 Los Angeles mayoral election
