= 2026 Los Angeles County elections =

- November 3, 2026
- Registered: 5,908,408

The 2026 Los Angeles County elections were held on November 3, 2026, in Los Angeles County, California, with nonpartisan primary elections for certain offices being held on June 2. Two of the five seats of the Board of Supervisors were up for election, as well as two of the countywide elected officials, the Sheriff and the Assessor.

Municipal elections in California are officially nonpartisan; candidates' party affiliations do not appear on the ballot.

== Board of Supervisors ==
Two of the five seats of the Los Angeles County Board of Supervisors are up for election to four-year terms. Incumbent supervisor Lindsey Horvath was eligible for re-election to a second term, while supervisor Hilda Solis was term-limited and barred from running for a fourth term. In the primary election, María Elena Durazo was elected to succeed Solis, and Horvath won re-election outright.

== Sheriff ==
2026 Los Angeles County Sheriff election

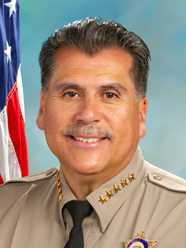

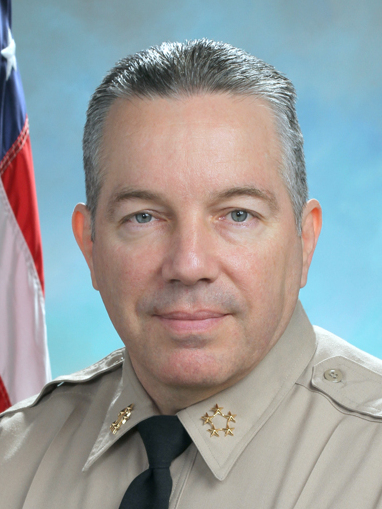
Candidate	Robert Luna	Alex Villanueva
First round	859,070; 44.2%	422,272; 21.7%
Runoff	2,000,834; 70.2%	847,950; 29.8%
Candidate	Eric Strong	Karla Carranza
First round	291,045; 15.0%	114,615; 5.9%
Runoff	Eliminated	Eliminated
Sheriff before election
Robert Luna
Elected Sheriff
Robert Luna

Incumbent sheriff Robert Luna was first elected in 2022 with 61.3% of the vote, defeating Alex Villanueva in his bid for re-election. Luna declared his intention to run for re-election in November 2024 amidst speculation that he would step down due to health complications.

In the June primary, Luna failed to earn a majority of votes cast, sending him to the November runoff against Villanueva, setting up a rematch of the 2022 election. Luna is seeking to become the first Los Angeles County Sheriff to win re-election since Lee Baca was elected to his fourth term in 2010.

=== Candidates ===
==== Advanced to runoff ====
- Robert Luna, incumbent sheriff
- Alex Villanueva, former sheriff and candidate for supervisor in 2024

==== Eliminated in primary ====
- Mike Bornman, retired LASD captain
- Brendan Corbett, former LASD assistant sheriff
- Oscar Martinez, LASD lieutenant
- Eric Strong, LASD lieutenant and former candidate for sheriff in 2022
- Andre White, LASD detective

=== Endorsements ===
Robert Luna

Newspapers

- Los Angeles Daily News

Organizations

- Los Angeles County Democratic Party
- Stonewall Democrats

Labor unions

- Los Angeles County Federation of Labor
Alex Villanueva

Organizations

- Los Angeles County Republican Party

=== Results ===
2026 Los Angeles County Sheriff election
Primary election
Candidate	Votes	%
Robert Luna (incumbent)	859,070	44.15
Alex Villanueva	422,272	21.70
Eric Strong	291,045	14.96
Karla Carranza	114,615	5.89
Oscar Antonio Martinez	80,885	4.16
Mike Bornman	76,919	3.95
Andre White	76,162	3.91
Brendan Corbett	24,618	1.27
Total votes	1,087,445	100.00
General election
Robert Luna (incumbent)	2,000,834	70.23
Alex Villanueva	847,950	29.77
Total votes	2,848,784	

== Assessor ==
Incumbent assessor Jeffrey Prang, a Democrat and former mayor of West Hollywood, is not subject to term limits and is seeking re-election in 2026.

Assessor Jeffrey Prang's office was found liable in a March 2026 civil trial for providing tax breaks to LA Official's associates. Court documents show several groups and individuals, including John M. Barger, the brother of Los Angeles County Supervisor Kathryn Barger, the Rand Corp., and the Paley Center received special treatment.

Prang faced controversy during his tenure on the West Hollywood City Council after a former aide accused him of sexual misconduct in 1999; Prang denied the allegations, and no criminal charges were filed. The City of West Hollywood paid $30,000 and Prang issued a televised apology.

Campaign finance records show that Democratic donor Ed Buck contributed to numerous California politicians, including Jeffrey Prang, prior to Buck's felony criminal conviction.

=== Candidates ===
==== Declared ====
- Stephen Adamus, deputy assessor
- Rob Newland, Real Estate Appraiser & Housing Economist
- Jeffrey Prang, incumbent assessor
- Sandy Sun, deputy assessor and candidate for the seat in 2018 and 2022

===== Endorsements =====
Jeffrey Prang

U.S. senators

- Alex Padilla, California (2021–present)

County officials

- Kathryn Barger, Los Angeles County supervisor from the 5th district (2016–present)
- Janice Hahn, Los Angeles County supervisor from the 4th district (2016–present)
- Lindsey Horvath, Los Angeles County supervisor from the 3rd district (2022–present)
- Hilda Solis, Los Angeles County supervisor from the 1st district (2014–present)

Local officials

- Karen Bass, mayor of Los Angeles (2022–present)

Organizations

- Los Angeles County Democratic Party
- Los Angeles County Republican Party
- Stonewall Democrats

Labor unions

- Los Angeles County Federation of Labor

Newspapers

- Southern California News Group

=== Results ===
2026 Los Angeles County Assessor election
Candidate	Votes	%
Jeffrey Prang (incumbent)	1,028,580	57.73
Sandy Sun	272,494	15.29
Rob Newland	223,986	12.57
Stephen Adamus	151,715	8.52
Steven Palty	104,919	5.89
Total votes	1,781,694	100.00

== Superior Court ==
Fifteen elections were held for judges to the Los Angeles County Superior Court on June 2. Four runoff elections will be held on November 3. Judges are elected to six-year terms.

=== Office 2 ===
2026 Los Angeles County Superior Court Judge No. 2 election
Candidate	Votes	%
Tal K. Valbuena	981,043	56.84
Robert S. Draper	744,824	43.16
Total votes	1,725,867	100.00

=== Office 14 ===
2026 Los Angeles County Superior Court Judge No. 14 election
Candidate	Votes	%
Irene Lee	964,365	56.91
Angie Christides	730,247	43.09
Total votes	1,694,612	100.00

=== Office 39 ===
2026 Los Angeles County Superior Court Judge No. 39 election
Candidate	Votes	%
Binh Q. Dang	1,393,411	100.00
Total votes	1,393,411	100.00

=== Office 60 ===
2026 Los Angeles County Superior Court Judge No. 60 election
Candidate	Votes	%
Ann M. Maurer	1,349,858	100.00
Total votes	1,349,858	100.00

=== Office 64 ===
2026 Los Angeles County Superior Court Judge No. 64 election
Primary election
Candidate	Votes	%
Maria Ghobadi	750,184	44.05
Rhonda A. Haymon	717,844	42.15
Francisco Amador	235,003	13.80
Total votes	1,703,031	100.00
General election
Maria Ghobadi	1,332,601	51.58
Rhonda A. Haymon	1,251,057	48.42
Total votes	2,583,658	

=== Office 65 ===
2026 Los Angeles County Superior Court Judge No. 65 election
Primary election
Candidate	Votes	%
Justin Allen Clayton	614,230	36.69
Anna Slotky	500,183	29.88
Samuel Wolloch Krause	341,861	20.42
Chellei G. Jimenez	217,865	13.01
Total votes	1,674,139	100.00
General election
Justin Allen Clayton	1,398,692	56.69
Anna Slotky	1,068,429	43.31
Total votes	2,467,121	

=== Office 66 ===
2026 Los Angeles County Superior Court Judge No. 66 election
Candidate	Votes	%
Ben Forer	1,161,181	70.02
Cheryl C. Turner	497,241	29.98
Total votes	1,658,422	100.00

=== Office 81 ===
2026 Los Angeles County Superior Court Judge No. 81 election
Candidate	Votes	%
David Walgren (incumbent)	1,267,154	76.89
Dan Kapelovitz	380,765	23.11
Total votes	1,647,919	100.00

=== Office 87 ===
2026 Los Angeles County Superior Court Judge No. 87 election
Primary election
Candidate	Votes	%
Anthony (A.J.) Bayne	694,004	42.04
David DeJute	516,631	31.30
Sharee Sanders Gordon	440,136	26.66
Total votes	1,650,771	100.00
General election
Anthony (A.J.) Bayne	1,368,067	55.36
David DeJute	1,103,293	44.64
Total votes	2,471,360	

=== Office 116 ===
2026 Los Angeles County Superior Court Judge No. 116 election
Candidate	Votes	%
Pat Connolly (incumbent)	836,922	50.46
Paul A. Thompson	821,581	49.54
Total votes	1,658,503	100.00

=== Office 131 ===
2026 Los Angeles County Superior Court Judge No. 131 election
Primary election
Candidate	Votes	%
Donna Tryfman	612,858	37.31
David Ross	546,032	33.24
Carlos Dammeier	245,969	14.97
Troy W. Slaten	237,894	14.48
Total votes	1,642,753	100.00
General election
Donna Tryfman	1,213,607	50.09
David Ross	1,209,301	49.91
Total votes	2,422,908	

=== Office 141 ===
2026 Los Angeles County Superior Court Judge No. 141 election
Candidate	Votes	%
Mariela Torres	1,393,278	100.0
Total votes	1,393,278	100.00

=== Office 176 ===
2026 Los Angeles County Superior Court Judge No. 176 election
Candidate	Votes	%
Gloria Marin	947,807	57.54
Zachary Smith	699,461	42.46
Total votes	1,647,268	100.00

=== Office 181 ===
2026 Los Angeles County Superior Court Judge No. 181 election
Candidate	Votes	%
Ryan Dibble	919,050	58.18
Thanayi Lindsey	660,620	41.82
Total votes	1,579,670	100.00

=== Office 196 ===
2026 Los Angeles County Superior Court Judge No. 196 election
Candidate	Votes	%
Candice J. Henry	1,376,202	100.00
Total votes	1,376,202	100.00

== Referendums ==
=== Primary election ===
The following referendum appeared on the June primary election ballot:

- Measure ER
  - Essential Services Restoration Act for Los Angeles County General Sales Tax Measure. This measure would increase the county-wide sales tax from 9.75% to 10.25% for the next five years, generating approximately $1 billion annually in order to provide funding for local health departments and healthcare services. Supporters of the measure include the Planned Parenthood Advocacy Project, the Los Angeles County Medical Association, and supervisor Holly Mitchell; the opposition includes the Los Angeles Taxpayers Association, supervisor Kathryn Barger, and the Los Angeles Daily News.

Measure ER
Choice	Votes	%
For	1,008,914	50.61
Against	984,478	49.39
Total	1,993,392	100.00
Registered voters/turnout	5,891,851	33.83

=== General election ===
The following two referendums appeared on the November general election ballot:

- Measure A
  - Charter Amendment Reiterating Good Faith Negotiation Obligations and Establishing Impartial Binding Arbitration for Certified Public Safety Employee Disputes. This measure would prohibit strikes, reiterate existing legal obligations for negotiations, and establish and impartial binding arbitration process for labor disputes for certain employees of the Fire Department, Sheriff's Department, and the Department of Medical Examiner. The Association for Los Angeles Deputy Sheriffs supports this measure.

Measure A
Choice	Votes	%
For	1,690,642	62.14
Against	1,029,896	37.86
Total	2,720,538	100.00

- Measure E
  - County of Los Angeles Ethics Commission and Community Investment Budget Allocation Charter Amendment. This measure would provide structure to the Los Angeles County Ethics Commission, Office of Ethics Compliance, and Ethics Compliance Officer, including appointment processes, qualifications, terms, and responsibilities. Supporters of the measure include the League of Women Voters of Los Angeles, the California chapter of Common Cause, and supervisor Lindsey Horvath.

Measure E
Choice	Votes	%
For	2,023,909	75.19
Against	667,964	24.81
Total	2,691,873	100.00

== See also ==
- Government of Los Angeles County
- 2026 California elections
