= 2022 Los Angeles County elections =

- November 8, 2022
- Registered: 5,627,796
- Turnout: 43.65% (▼32.33 pp)

The 2022 Los Angeles County elections were held on November 8, 2022, in Los Angeles County, California, with nonpartisan blanket primary elections for certain offices being held on June 7. Two of the five seats of the Board of Supervisors were up for election, as well as two of the countywide elected officials, the Sheriff and the Assessor. In addition, elections were held for the Superior Court, along with two ballot measures.

Municipal elections in California are officially nonpartisan; candidates' party affiliations do not appear on the ballot.

== Board of Supervisors ==
Two of the five seats of the Los Angeles County Board of Supervisors were up for election to four-year terms. Incumbent supervisors Hilda Solis handily won re-election in the primary. In the third district, incumbent Sheila Kuehl Supervisor Sheila Kuehl opted not to run for a third term, and instead chose to retire. State senator Robert Hertzberg West Hollywood City Councilor Lindsey Horvath advanced to the general election, eliminating state senator Henry Stern, Roxanne Beckford, Craig A. Brill and Jeffi Girgenti. Horvath narrowly defeated Hertzberg in the general election.

== Sheriff ==
2022 Los Angeles County Sheriff election
- Turnout: 26.05% ▲ (first round); 39.76% ▼ (runoff)
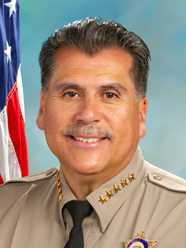

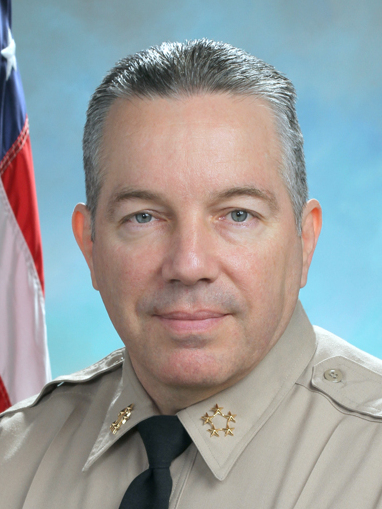

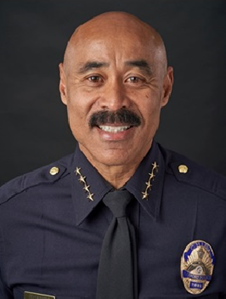

Candidate	Robert Luna	Alex Villanueva	Eric Strong
First round	383,181; 25.9%	454,556; 30.7%	232,274; 15.7%
Runoff	1,370,837; 61.3%	867,029; 38.7%	Eliminated
Candidate	Cecil Rhambo	Karla Yesenia Carranza
First round	113,386; 7.7%	75,688; 5.1%
Runoff	Eliminated	Eliminated
- Luna: 50–60% 60–70% Villanueva: 20–30% 30–40%
Sheriff before election
Alex Villanueva
Elected Sheriff
Robert Luna

Incumbent Sheriff Alex Villanueva ran for re-election to a second four-year term. He was first elected in 2018, defeating incumbent Jim McDonnell with 52.8% of the vote. Villanueva has been a controversial figure since then, including his refusal to enforce vaccine mandates during the COVID-19 pandemic in California, as well as investigations regarding unconstitutional policing, obstruction of evidence, and the persistence of deputy gangs. However, he is also credited with reforms in the department, including the implementation of body cameras and the removal of ICE agents from county jails.

=== Candidates ===
==== Advanced to runoff ====
- Robert Luna, former Long Beach Police Chief
- Alex Villanueva, incumbent sheriff

==== Declared ====
- Cecil Rhambo, Los Angeles Airport Police Chief
- Matt Rodriguez, retired Santa Paula Police Chief
- April Saucedo Hood, Long Beach Unified School District police officer
- Britta Steinbrenner, retired LASD captain
- Eric Strong, LASD lieutenant
- Eli Vera, LASD division chief
- Karla Yesenia Carranza

==== Did not file ====
- Enrique Del Real

==== Declined ====
- Art Acevedo, former chief of the Houston, Austin, and Miami Police Departments

=== Endorsements ===
Robert Luna

Police officers

- Cecil Rhambo, Los Angeles Airport Police Chief and former sheriff candidate
- April Saucedo Hood, Long Beach Unified School District police officer

Publications

- Los Angeles Daily News
- Los Angeles Times
Cecil Rhambo

Statewide officials

- Betty Yee, California State Controller (2015–present) and former member of the California State Board of Equalization (2004–2015)

County officials

- Sheila Kuehl, Los Angeles County Supervisor from the 3rd district (2014–present)

Organizations

- California Legislative Black Caucus
Eric Strong

Individuals

- Lilan Bowden, actress, filmmaker and comedian
- Stevie Wonder, musician

Organizations

- Stonewall Democrats

=== Polling ===
Poll source	Date(s) administered	Sample size (Note: Key: A – all adults RV – registered voters LV – likely voters V – unclear)	Margin of error	Robert Luna	Alex Villanueva	Undecided
Berkeley IGS	October 25–31, 2022	2,842 (LV)	± 2.5%	40%	32%	25%
Berkeley IGS	September 22–26, 2022	3,356 (LV)	± 2.5%	36%	29%	36%
Berkeley IGS	September 22–26, 2022	4,293 (RV)	± 2.0%	24%	29%	42%
Berkeley IGS	August 9–15, 2022	3,067 (LV)	± 2.5%	31%	27%	42%

=== Results ===
Primary results by locality: Villanueva—20–30% Villanueva—30–40% Villanueva—40–50% Villanueva—50–60% Villanueva—60–70% Luna—20–30% Luna—30–40% Luna—40–50% Strong—30–40% Rhambo—20–30% Rhambo—30–40% Tie No votes

2022 Los Angeles County Sheriff election
Primary election
Candidate	Votes	%
Alex Villanueva (incumbent)	454,556	30.66
Robert Luna	383,181	25.85
Eric Strong	232,274	15.67
Cecil Rhambo	113,386	7.65
Karla Yesenia Carranza	75,688	5.11
Britta Steinbrenner	66,191	4.47
Matt Rodriguez	63,757	4.30
Eli Vera	59,103	3.99
April Saucedo Hood	34,370	2.32
Total votes	1,482,506	100.00
General election
Robert Luna	1,370,837	61.26
Alex Villanueva (incumbent)	867,029	38.74
Total votes	2,237,866	100.00

== Assessor ==
2022 Los Angeles County Assessor election
- Turnout: 23.38% ▼
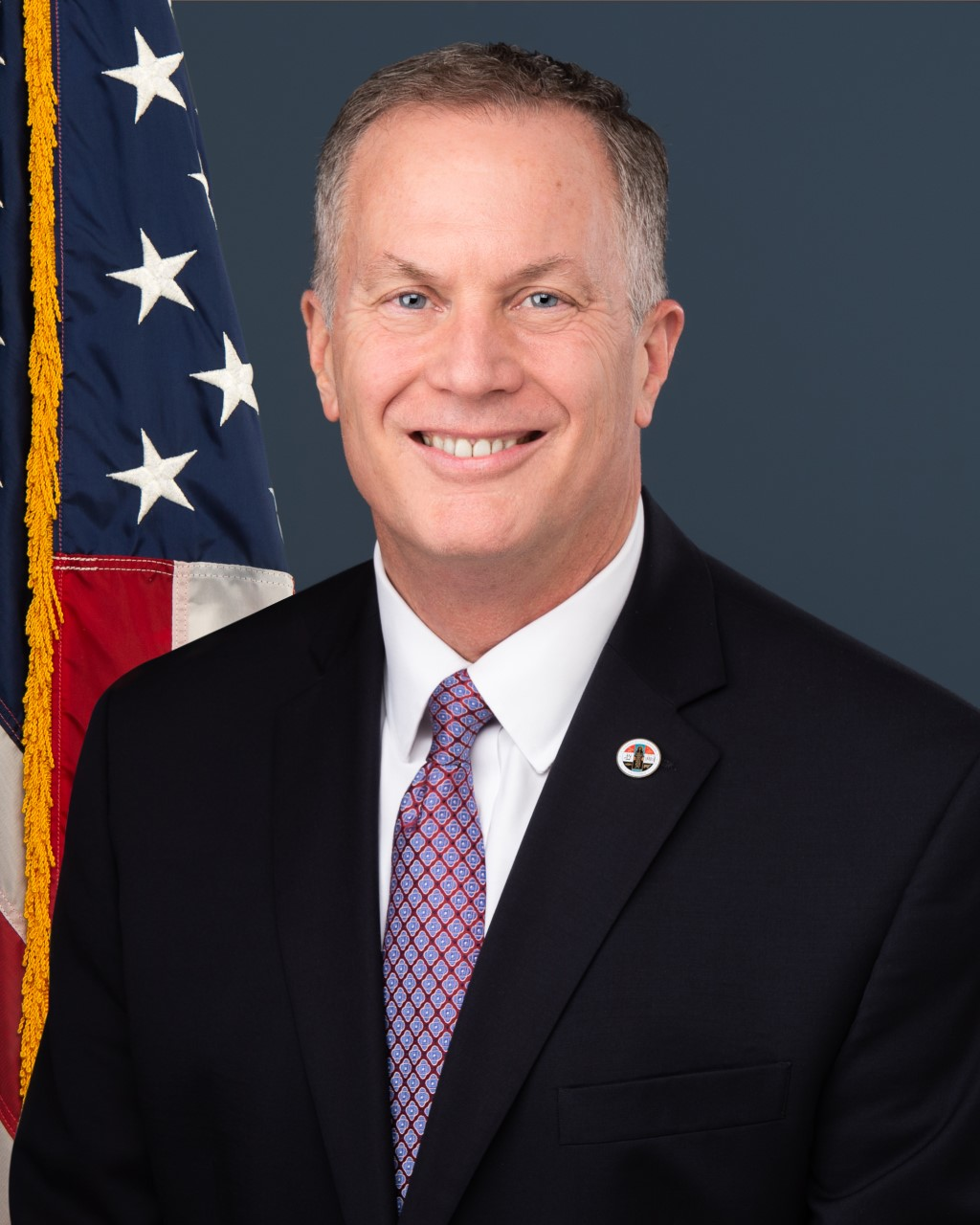

Candidate	Jeffrey Prang	Sandy Sun
Popular vote	667,160	299,364
Percentage	50.2%	22.5%
Candidate	Mike Campbell	Anthony Lopez
Popular vote	210,572	153,101
Percentage	15.8%	11.5%
- Results by county supervisorial district Prang: 40–50% 50–60%
Assessor before election
Jeffrey Prang
Elected Assessor
Jeffrey Prang

Incumbent Assessor Jeffrey Prang ran for re-election to a third four-year term. He was re-elected in 2018 with 60.3% of the vote.

=== Candidates ===
==== Declared ====
- Mike Campbell, deputy assessor
- Anthony Lopez, deputy assessor
- Jeffrey Prang, incumbent assessor
- Sandy Sun, deputy assessor

=== Endorsements ===
Jeffrey Prang

Publications

- Los Angeles Times

Organizations

- Equality California
- Los Angeles County Democratic Party
- Stonewall Democrats

=== Results ===
2022 Los Angeles County Assessor election
Primary election
Candidate	Votes	%
Jeffrey Prang (incumbent)	667,160	50.15
Sandy Sun	299,364	22.51
Mike Campbell	210,572	15.83
Anthony Lopez	153,101	11.51
Total votes	1,330,197	100.00

== Superior Court ==
Nine elections were held for judges to the Los Angeles County Superior Court on June 7. Runoff elections were scheduled to be held on November 8 if no candidate received a majority of the vote. Judges are elected to six-year terms.

=== Office 3 ===
==== Candidates ====
- Frank Amador, attorney
- Sherilyn Peace Garnett, incumbent judge
- Tim Reuben, attorney

==== Endorsements ====
Sherilyn Peace Garnett

Newspapers

- Los Angeles Times
Tim Reuben

Organizations

- Los Angeles County Democratic Party
- Stonewall Democrats

==== Results ====
2022 Los Angeles County Superior Court Judge No. 3 election
Primary election
Candidate	Votes	%
Sherilyn Peace Garnett (incumbent)	791,133	62.54
Tim Reuben	296,344	23.43
Frank Amador	177,533	14.03
Total votes	1,265,010	100.00

=== Office 60 ===
==== Candidates ====
- Abby Baron, Deputy Los Angeles County District Attorney
- Sharon Ransom, Deputy Los Angeles County District Attorney
- Mark Rosenfeld, attorney
- Troy Slaten, administrative law judge at the California Department of Industrial Relations
- Anna Slotky, Deputy Los Angeles County Public Defender

==== Endorsements ====
Abby Baron

Organizations

- Association for Los Angeles Deputy Sheriffs

Newspapers

- Los Angeles Times
Sharon Ransom

Organizations

- Stonewall Democrats
Anna Slotky

Organizations

- Working Families Party

==== Results ====
2022 Los Angeles County Superior Court Judge No. 60 election
Primary election
Candidate	Votes	%
Abby Baron	387,025	30.30
Anna Slotky	359,512	28.14
Sharon Ransom	282,196	22.09
Troy Slaten	128,024	10.02
Mark Rosenfeld	120,711	9.45
Total votes	1,277,468	100.00
General election
Abby Baron	1,026,777	55.31
Anna Slotky	829,766	44.69
Total votes	1,856,543	100.00

=== Office 67 ===
==== Candidates ====
- Fernanda Maria Barreto, Deputy Los Angeles County District Attorney
- Ryan Dibble, Deputy Los Angeles County District Attorney
- Elizabeth Lashley-Haynes, Deputy Los Angeles County Public Defender

==== Endorsements ====
Ryan Dibble

Organizations

- Association for Los Angeles Deputy Sheriffs
Elizabeth Lashley-Haynes

Organizations

- Los Angeles County Democratic Party
- Stonewall Democrats
- Working Families Party
Fernanda Maria Barreto

Newspapers

- Los Angeles Times

==== Results ====
2022 Los Angeles County Superior Court Judge No. 67 election
Primary election
Candidate	Votes	%
Elizabeth Lashley-Haynes	477,815	37.16
Fernanda Maria Barreto	464,697	36.14
Ryan Dibble	343,228	26.70
Total votes	1,285,740	100.00
General election
Fernanda Maria Barreto	1,000,532	53.09
Elizabeth Lashley-Haynes	884,004	46.91
Total votes	1,884,536	100.00

=== Office 70 ===
==== Candidates ====
- Renee Yolande Chang, Deputy Los Angeles County District Attorney
- Randy Fudge, Long Beach Assistant City Prosecutor
- Holly L. Hancock, Deputy Los Angeles County Public Defender
- Eric Alfonso Torices, attorney and adjunct professor
- Matthew Vodnoy, attorney

==== Endorsements ====
Holly L. Hancock

Organizations

- Los Angeles County Democratic Party
- Stonewall Democrats
- Working Families Party

Newspapers

- Los Angeles Times
Renee Yolande Chang

Organizations

- Association for Los Angeles Deputy Sheriffs

==== Results ====
2022 Los Angeles County Superior Court Judge No. 70 election
Primary election
Candidate	Votes	%
Holly L. Hancock	604,725	46.71
Renee Yolande Chang	412,307	31.85
Randy Fudge	116,217	8.98
Eric Alfonso Torices	91,757	7.09
Matthew Vodnoy	69,534	5.37
Total votes	1,294,540	100.00
General election
Holly L. Hancock	1,114,500	58.62
Renee Yolande Chang	786,868	41.38
Total votes	1,901,368	100.00

=== Office 90 ===
==== Candidates ====
- Leslie Gutierrez, Deputy Los Angeles County District Attorney
- Naser Khoury, attorney
- Melissa Lyons, Deputy Los Angeles County District Attorney
- Kevin Thomas McGurk, Deputy Los Angeles County Public Defender

==== Endorsements ====
Leslie Gutierrez

Organizations

- Association for Los Angeles Deputy Sheriffs
Melissa Lyons

Organizations

- Stonewall Democrats

Newspapers

- Los Angeles Times
Kevin Thomas McGurk

Organizations

- Los Angeles County Democratic Party

==== Results ====
2022 Los Angeles County Superior Court Judge No. 90 election
Primary election
Candidate	Votes	%
Melissa Lyons	452,247	35.28
Leslie Gutierrez	355,881	27.76
Kevin Thomas McGurk	353,589	27.58
Naser Khoury	120,161	9.37
Total votes	1,281,878	100.00
General election
Melissa Lyons	1,091,579	59.62
Leslie Gutierrez	739,192	40.38
Total votes	1,830,771	100.00

=== Office 116 ===
==== Candidates ====
- David Gelfound, incumbent judge
- Lloyd Handler, Deputy Los Angeles County Public Defender

==== Endorsements ====
David Gelfound

Organizations

- Association for Los Angeles Deputy Sheriffs

Newspapers

- Los Angeles Times
Lloyd Handler

Organizations

- Los Angeles County Democratic Party

==== Results ====
2022 Los Angeles County Superior Court Judge No. 116 election
Primary election
Candidate	Votes	%
David Gelfound (incumbent)	806,538	64.93
Lloyd Handler	435,631	35.07
Total votes	1,242,169	100.00

=== Office 118 ===
==== Candidates ====
- Melissa Hammond, Deputy Los Angeles County District Attorney
- Georgia Huerta, Deputy Los Angeles County District Attorney
- Keith Koyano, Deputy Los Angeles County District Attorney
- Klint McKay, supervising ALJ for the California Department of Social Services
- Carolyn Park, attorney
- Shawn Thever, Deputy Los Angeles County Counsel

==== Endorsements ====
Melissa Hammond

Newspapers

- Los Angeles Times
Georgia Huerta

Organizations

- Los Angeles County Democratic Party
Keith Koyano

Organizations

- Association for Los Angeles Deputy Sheriffs
Klint McKay

Organizations

- Stonewall Democrats
Carolyn Park

Organizations

- Working Families Party

==== Results ====
2022 Los Angeles County Superior Court Judge No. 118 election
Primary election
Candidate	Votes	%
Melissa Hammond	377,672	29.50
Carolyn Park	288,424	22.53
Keith Koyano	216,998	16.95
Georgia Huerta	193,439	15.11
Klint McKay	176,898	13.82
Shawn Thever	26,754	2.09
Total votes	1,280,185	100.00
General election
Melissa Hammond	1,149,236	61.70
Carolyn Park	713,333	38.30
Total votes	1,862,569	100.00

=== Office 151 ===
==== Candidates ====
- Thomas D. Allison, attorney and professor
- Karen A. Brako, Deputy Los Angeles County District Attorney
- Patrick Hare, Deputy Los Angeles County Public Defender
- Richard Quiñones, Deputy Los Angeles County District Attorney

==== Endorsements ====
Patrick Hare

Organizations

- Los Angeles County Democratic Party
- Stonewall Democrats

Newspapers

- Los Angeles Times

==== Results ====
2022 Los Angeles County Superior Court Judge No. 151 election
Primary election
Candidate	Votes	%
Patrick Hare	494,095	39.30
Karen A. Brako	301,745	24.00
Thomas D. Allison	240,670	19.14
Richard Quiñones	220,597	17.55
Total votes	1,257,107	100.00
General election
Patrick Hare	1,103,644	59.65
Karen A. Brako	746,554	40.35
Total votes	1,850,198	100.00

=== Office 156 ===
==== Candidates ====
- Carol Elswick, incumbent judge
- Albert Robles, former mayor of Carson

==== Endorsements ====
Carol Elswick

Organizations

- Los Angeles County Democratic Party
- Stonewall Democrats

Newspapers

- Los Angeles Times

==== Results ====
2022 Los Angeles County Superior Court Judge No. 156 election
Primary election
Candidate	Votes	%
Carol Elswick (incumbent)	841,715	68.48
Albert Robles	387,413	31.52
Total votes	1,229,128	100.00

== Ballot measures ==
The following referendums appeared on the general election ballot:

- Measure A
  - Providing Authority to Remove an Elected Sheriff for Cause. This charter amendment would allow the Board of Supervisors to remove an elected Sheriff from office by a four-fifths vote for reasons including "violation of law related to a Sheriff's duties, flagrant or repeated neglect of duties, misappropriation of funds, willful falsification of documents, or obstructing an investigation." The amendment is supported by a majority of the Board of Supervisors and the Los Angeles Times, and is opposed by Sheriff Alex Villanueva.

Measure A
Choice	Votes	%
For	1,633,918	71.84
Against	640,361	28.16
Total	2,274,279	100.00

- Measure C
  - Cannabis Business Tax Measure. This measure would enact an annual tax on cannabis businesses located in unincorporated areas of the county.

Measure C
Choice	Votes	%
For	1,323,160	60.18
Against	875,617	39.82
Total	2,198,777	100.00

== See also ==
- Government of Los Angeles County
- 2022 California elections
