= 2022 Los Angeles County Board of Supervisors election =

2022 Los Angeles County Board of Supervisors elections
- June 7, 2022; November 8, 2022

2 out of 5 seats of the Los Angeles County Board of Supervisors 3 seats needed for a majority
	Majority party	Minority party
Party	Democratic	Republican
Seats before	4	1
Seats won	4	1
Seats after	4	1
Seat change	Steady	Steady

The 2022 Los Angeles County Board of Supervisors elections took place on June 7, 2022, with runoff elections held on November 8, 2022, to elect members of the Los Angeles County Board of Supervisors. Two of the five seats on the board were up for election to four-year terms.

Municipal elections in California are officially nonpartisan; candidates' party affiliations do not appear on the ballot.

== District 1 ==
2022 Los Angeles County Board of Supervisors election District 1

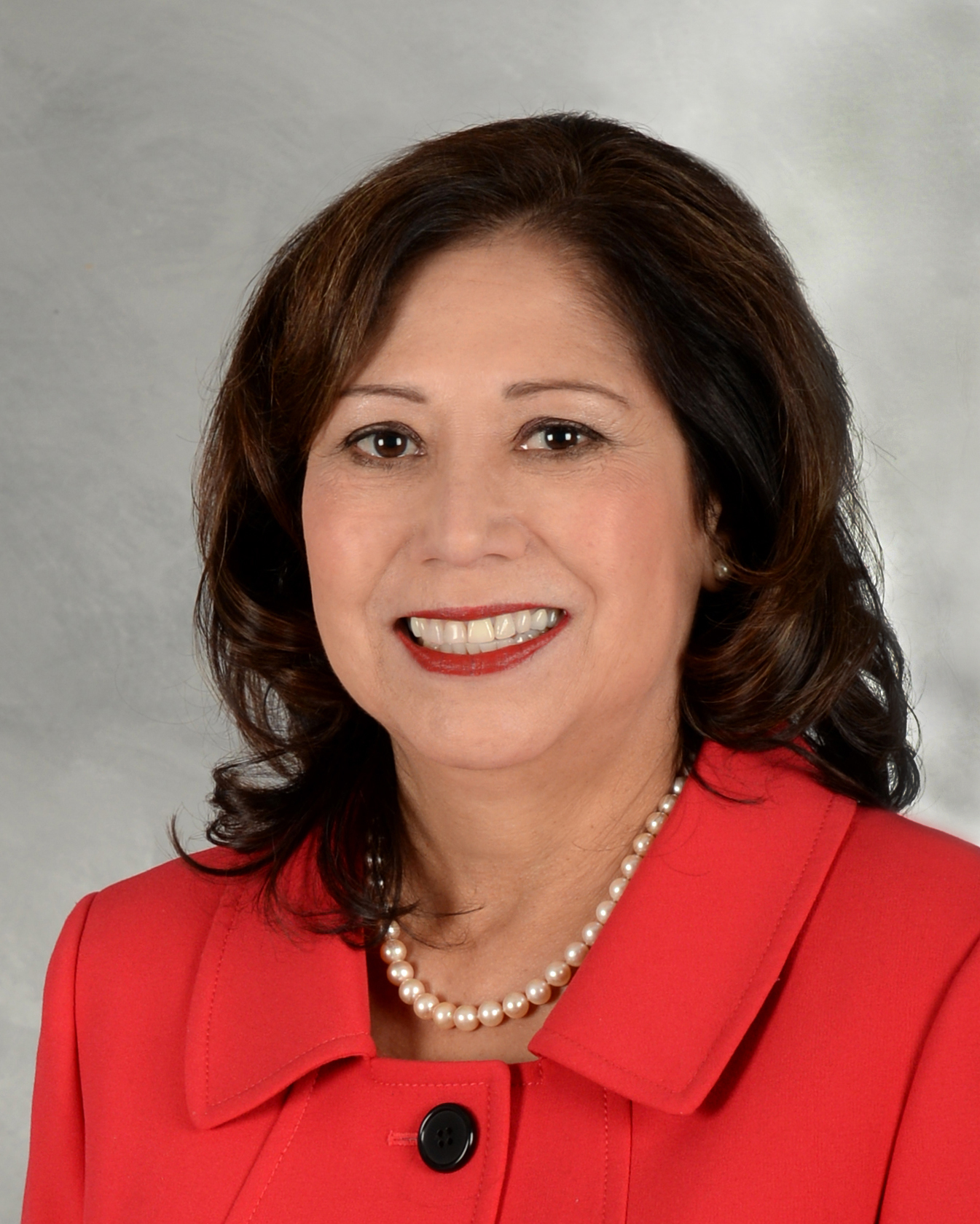

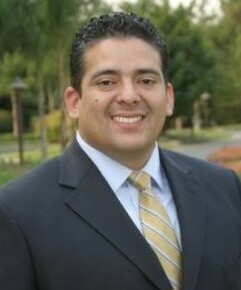
Candidate	Hilda Solis	David E. Argudo
Popular vote	166,858	15,910
Percentage	75.91%	7.24%
Candidate	Kevin Dalton	Brian Smith
Popular vote	15,723	14,375
Percentage	7.15%	6.54%
Supervisor before election
Hilda Solis
Supervisor after election
Hilda Solis

The first supervisorial district contains Downtown, Northeast Los Angeles and Eastside Los Angeles, parts of the San Gabriel Valley, and the eastern Pomona Valley. It includes the cities of Montebello, Pomona, West Covina, El Monte and Alhambra. Incumbent supervisor Hilda Solis ran for re-election to a third term. She was re-elected in 2018 unopposed.

=== Candidates ===
==== Declared ====
- David E. Argudo, La Puente city councilor
- Kevin Dalton, entrepreneur
- Hilda Solis, incumbent supervisor and former United States Secretary of Labor
- Tammy Solis, businesswoman
- Brian Smith

=== Endorsements ===
Hilda Solis

Publications

- Los Angeles Times

Organizations

- Los Angeles County Democratic Party
- Stonewall Democrats

=== Results ===
2022 First supervisorial district election
Primary election
Candidate	Votes	%
Hilda Solis (incumbent)	166,858	75.91
David E. Argudo	15,910	7.24
Kevin Dalton	15,723	7.15
Brian Smith	14,375	6.54
Tammy Solis	6,935	3.16
Total votes	219,801	100.00

== District 3 ==
2022 Los Angeles County Board of Supervisors election District 3
- Registered: 2,129,498
- Turnout: 37.84%
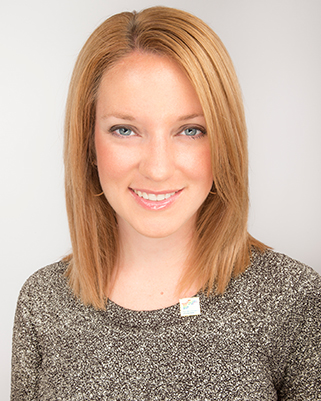

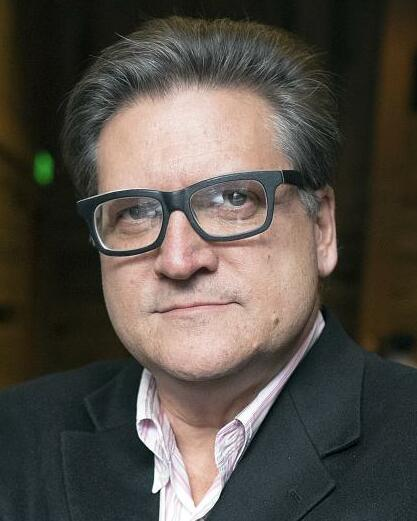

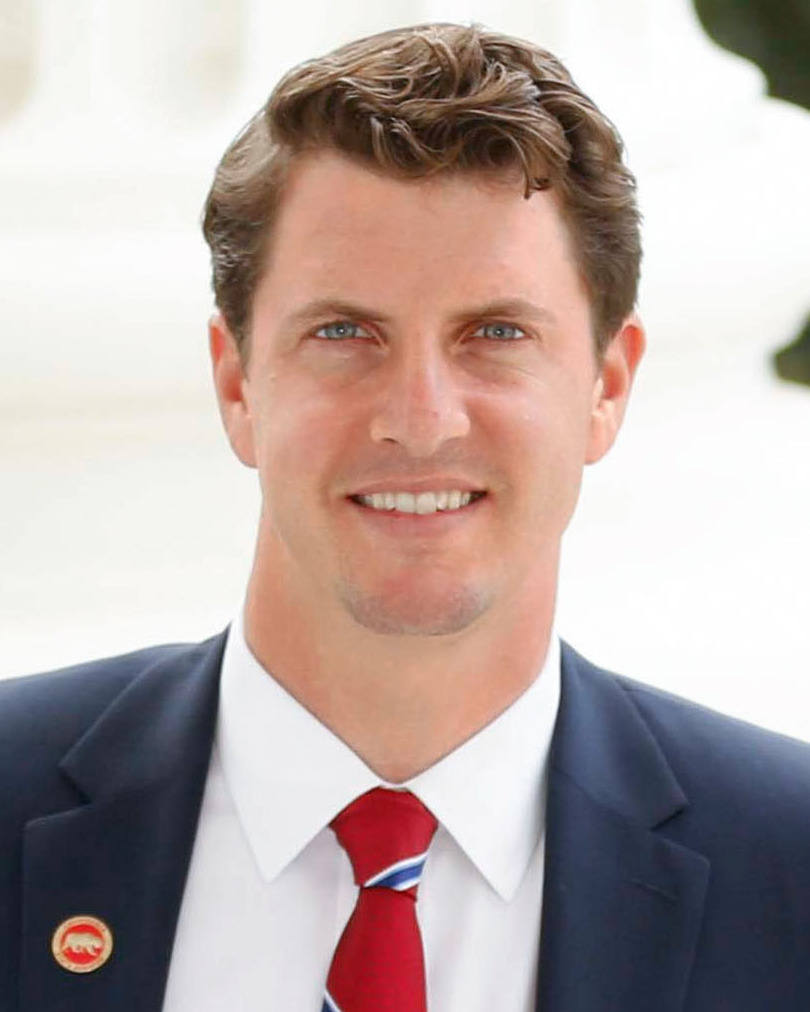
Candidate	Lindsey Horvath	Robert Hertzberg	Henry Stern
First round	94,528; 27.74%	105,923; 31.08%	82,852; 24.41%
Runoff	227,561; 52.24%	208,019; 47.76%	Eliminated
Candidate	Jeffi Girgenti	Roxanne Beckford
First round	27,382; 8.04%	22,352; 6.56%
Runoff	Eliminated	Eliminated
Supervisor before election
Sheila Kuehl
Supervisor after election
Lindsey Horvath

The third supervisorial district covers the western areas of the county, encapsulating the Westside, Santa Monica Mountains, and San Fernando Valley. It includes the cities of Santa Monica, West Hollywood, and Beverly Hills. Incumbent supervisor Sheila Kuehl opted not to run for a third term and had instead chosen to retire. She was re-elected in 2018 with 75.5% of the vote.

=== Candidates ===
==== Advanced to runoff ====
- Robert Hertzberg, state senator from the 18th district and former state assemblyman from the 40th district
- Lindsey Horvath, West Hollywood city councillor and former mayor

==== Eliminated in primary ====
- Roxanne Beckford, actress
- Craig A. Brill, canine recreational provider
- Jeffi Girgenti, small business owner
- Henry Stern, state senator from the 27th district

==== Withdrew ====
- Richard Bloom, state assemblyman from the 50th district

==== Retiring ====
- Sheila Kuehl, Chair Pro Tem and incumbent supervisor

=== Endorsements ===
Robert Hertzberg

U.S. Representatives

- Tony Cárdenas, U.S. Representative from California's 29th congressional district (2013–present)

Statewide officials

- Eleni Kounalakis, Lieutenant Governor of California (2019–present)
- Fiona Ma, California State Treasurer (2019–present)
- Gray Davis, former Governor of California (1999–2003), former Lieutenant Governor of California (1995–1999), and former California State Controller (1987–1995)

State assemblymembers

- Anthony Rendon, Speaker of the California State Assembly (2016–present) from the 63rd district (2012–present) (co-endorsed with Horvath)
- Fabian Núñez, former Speaker of the California State Assembly (2004–2008) from the 46th district (2002–2008)
- John Pérez, former Speaker of the California State Assembly (2010–2014) from the 53rd district (2008–2014)

County officials

- Kathryn Barger, Los Angeles County supervisor from the 5th district (2016–present)

Organizations

- Association for Los Angeles Deputy Sheriffs
Lindsey Horvath

State assemblymembers

- Anthony Rendon, Speaker of the California State Assembly (2016–present) from the 63rd district (2012–present) (co-endorsed with Hertzberg)

County officials

- Janice Hahn, Los Angeles County supervisor from the 4th district (2016–present)
- Sheila Kuehl, Los Angeles County supervisor from the 3rd district (2014–present)
- Holly Mitchell, Los Angeles County supervisor from the 2nd district (2020–present)
- Hilda Solis, Los Angeles County supervisor from the 1st district (2014–present)

Municipal officials

- Eric Garcetti, Mayor of Los Angeles (2013–present) and former President of the Los Angeles City Council (2006–2012) from the 13th district (2001–2013)
- Joe Buscaino, Los Angeles city councilor from the 15th district (2012–present)

Newspapers

- Los Angeles Times

Organizations

- Center for Biological Diversity Action Fund (dual endorsement with Stern)
- Los Angeles League of Conservation Voters
- National Women's Political Caucus
- Run for Something
- Stonewall Democrats
Henry Stern

State legislators

- Ben Allen, state senator from the 26th district (2014–present)
- María Elena Durazo, state senator from the 24th district (2018–present)
- Connie Leyva, state senator from the 20th district (2014–present)

Organizations

- Center for Biological Diversity Action Fund (dual endorsement with Horvath)
- SEIU Local 721
- Sierra Club
- United Teachers Los Angeles
- Working Families Party

Individuals

- Kim Kardashian

=== Results ===
2022 Third supervisorial district election
Primary election
Candidate	Votes	%
Robert Hertzberg	105,923	31.08
Lindsey Horvath	94,528	27.74
Henry Stern	82,852	24.31
Jeffi Girgenti	27,382	8.04
Roxanne Beckford	22,352	6.56
Craig A. Brill	7,743	2.27
Total votes	340,780	100.0
General election
Lindsey Horvath	227,561	52.24
Robert Hertzberg	208,019	47.76
Total votes	435,580	100.0
