= Killing of Anthony Weber =

African-American boy shot and killed by police in 2018

- Date: February 4, 2018; 8 years ago
- Location: Westmont, California, U.S.
- Type: Child homicide by shooting, police killing
- Deaths: Anthony Weber, 16
- Charges: None
- Litigation: Lawsuit by Weber's family settled for $3.75 million

On February 4, 2018, Anthony Weber, a 16-year-old African-American boy, was fatally shot by deputies from the Los Angeles County Sheriff's Department in Westmont, California. Deputies came to the scene because they received a 911 call. The caller claimed someone had pointed a gun at him. The deputies claimed that Weber reached into his waistband so they shot him over ten times. Deputies did not find a gun on Weber.

== Aftermath ==
Days after the shooting amid rising tension in the community, a meeting was called between the Sheriff's department and the community. At the meeting, tensions were high between members of the community and law enforcement. Members of the Weber family demanded to see the gun. John Weber, Anthony's older brother, asked Captain Chris Bergner if the family and community were "due something?" Bergner replied: "absolutely not." The meeting ended in jeers after the response. The next day, Bergner claimed he could not hear the question and thought the question was "Don't you think we are doomed?" Xavier Thompson, a member of an oversight commission, responded: "We will not settle for spin." Los Angeles County announced a settlement with Weber's family for $3.75 million in May 2019.

== Reaction ==
=== Family ===
Weber's family were upset as his body remained in the street uncovered for hours after the shooting. Chris Bergner from the Sheriff's department, claimed that Weber was "a local gang member in the area," but Weber's father has denied that allegation. The Weber family also denied the allegation that Weber was armed with a gun.

Members of the family and local activists have demanded an independent investigation by the California Attorney General's office. Najee Ali, speaking for the Weber family, said "Last night's sheriff's meeting was outrageous and a waste of time." She went on: "The family, as well as many civil rights leaders, feel no trust in the Sheriff's Department to investigate their own. That's why today the family, along with civil rights leaders, are calling upon California's Attorney General Javier Becerra to investigate."

=== Protests ===
After the shooting, activists in Los Angeles protested the shooting of Weber. Activists from Black Lives Matter have protested Weber's death. During 2018 NBA All-Star Game weekend, activists continued to protest Weber's death.

=== Sheriff's department ===
The day after the shooting, the Sheriff's department had a press conference at the Hall of Justice. The Sheriff's department played the 911 call that brought deputies to the scene. Bergner defended the actions of the deputies involved in the shooting and characterized Weber as a gang member. The Sheriff's department claims the gun may have been taken.

A week after the shooting, Jim McDonnell acknowledged the possibility that Weber was not armed when he was shot.
