= Max Huntsman =

American lawyer and Inspector General

Max Huntsman is an American attorney who became the first Inspector General of Los Angeles County, California in 2013. He is recognized for his oversight of the county's law enforcement agencies, with a focus on constitutional policing and justice administration. Huntsman graduated from Yale Law School and started his career as a civil servant in 1991, at the Los Angeles District Attorney's Office, where he handled political corruption and police misconduct cases.

As Inspector General, Huntsman's Office of Inspector General (OIG) has advocated for transparency and reforms in the Los Angeles County Sheriff's Department, Probation Department, mental health care, and skilled nursing home oversight. Huntsman initiated an investigation into alleged gang activity within the Los Angeles County Sheriff Department. His tenure has seen conflicts with former Sheriff Alex Villanueva, who accused Huntsman of criminal conduct and restricted his access to department resources. Villanueva's actions were later reversed by Sheriff Robert Luna in 2022.
