= John Scott (sheriff) =

American law enforcement official

John L. Scott
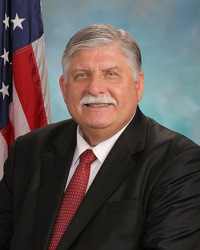
- Scott in 2014
- Police career
- Country: United States
- Allegiance: County of Los Angeles
- Department: Los Angeles County Sheriff's Department
- Service years: 2008–present 1969–2005
- Rank: Interim sheriff (2014); Undersheriff (2008–2014); Division Chief (2002–2005); Area Commander (2001–2002); Captain (1995–2001); Lieutenant (1984–1995); Sergeant (1974–1984); Deputy sheriff (1969–1974)
- Awards: Distinguished Service Award "36 Years of Dedicated Service"; Exemplary Service Award "Threat Assessment Program"; Meritorious Service Award "Member of Budget Review Committee"; Letter of Commendation "Life Saving Award of a Fellow Deputy"

John L. Scott is an American law enforcement official who served as the interim Sheriff of Los Angeles County, California from January 30, 2014 to December 1, 2014. Scott was appointed L.A. County's 31st sheriff by the L.A. County Board of Supervisors when his predecessor Lee Baca resigned before the end of his elected term.

== Early life and education ==
Scott holds a bachelor's degree in Management from Redlands University, and a master's degree in Public Communications from Pepperdine University.

== Career ==
Scott joined the Los Angeles County Sheriff's Department in January 1969. As a deputy, he patrolled the Lakewood Station area. In 1974, he was promoted to Sergeant and held assignments at Firestone Station, the Special Enforcement Bureau and the Emergency Operations Bureau. Following his promotion to the rank of Lieutenant in 1984, Commander Scott took assignments at Men's Central Jail, Carson Station, Field Operations Region II Headquarters, the Office of Emergency Management, Employee Relations, and was the Executive Aide to the Assistant Sheriff. In 1995, he took command of Carson Station following his promotion to Captain. In June 2001, he held the rank of Acting Commander, leading the Custody Operations Division, North Facilities. In June 2005, he retired from the Sheriff's Department. In 2008, he came back from retirement and was appointed Undersheriff for the Orange County Sheriff's Department.

== Personal life ==
Scott is married to Alice Scott, who is a retired Captain with the L.A. County Sheriff's Department. Scott has four adult children: 2 with current wife Alice Scott (Benjamin and Wesley) and 2 with former wife Elaine Scott (John, aka JD and Michael). When Scott is off duty, he enjoys skiing, traveling, reading, and various family activities. He has been a collector of antique vehicles all his life, specifically the 1957 Chevy Bel Air.

Police appointments
Preceded by Lee Baca	Los Angeles County Sheriff	Succeeded by Jim McDonnell
