= Los Angeles Police Protective League =

Labor union for the Los Angeles Police Department

- Predecessor: Police and Fire Protective League
- Founded: 1923
- Headquarters: 1308 West Eighth St. Los Angeles, California 90017
- Location: Los Angeles, California
- Members: 9,900
- Key people: Craig Lally, President; Jerretta Sandoz, Vice President
- Publication: Thin Blue Line
- Affiliations: National Association of Police Organizations; California Coalition of Law Enforcement Associations; Southern California Alliance of Law Enforcement; United Coalition of Public Safety
- Website: www.lapd.com

The Los Angeles Police Protective League (LAPPL) is the police union representing Los Angeles Police Department (LAPD) officers up to the rank of lieutenant. LAPPL has a membership of 9,900 sworn officers.

The LAPPL serves to protect the interests of LAPD officers through lobbying, legislative and legal advocacy, political action and education. LAPPL has long supported more traditional law-and-order policies. As of 2020, LAPPL is currently led by Craig Lally, President, and Jerretta Sandoz, Vice President.

== History ==
The predecessor to LAPPL, Police and Fire Protective League, was formed in 1923, to protect the combined pension system for the Los Angeles Police and Fire Departments. In 1973, the Police and Fire Protective League was separated into two unions, the United Firefighters of Los Angeles City, and LAPPL.

In 2009, the LAPPL launched a free daily electronic news clipping service that summarizes the law enforcement and relevant government news of the day. LAPPL also publishes an official blog featuring information and commentary from LAPPL leadership, as well as Thin Blue Line, a monthly e-magazine.

That same year, LAPPL partnered with Association for Los Angeles Deputy Sheriffs (ALADS), the LASD union, to form a political action committee (PAC) called the California Law and Order Independent Expenditure Committee.

== Leadership ==
As of 2020, LAPPL is led by Craig Lally, President, and Jerretta Sandoz, Vice President. Craig Lally was named as a "problem officer" in the Christopher Commission, an independent panel that proposed reforms in the wake of the 1991 police beating of Rodney King. The officers were flagged by the commission to illustrate the problem of excessive force in the LAPD.

== Controversies ==
=== Disciplinary process ===
In May 2017, the LAPD union backed Measure C, which provides police officers accused of wrongdoing with the flexibility to seek resolution through an all-civilian discipline board, in addition to a traditional board comprising two command officers and one civilian examiner. The measure, despite opposition from the American Civil Liberties Union for its purported weakening of LAPD's disciplinary system, was passed by Los Angeles city voters. The Los Angeles Times editorial board also endorsed a "no" vote for the measure, characterizing the measure as a "union ploy to go soft on police misconduct."

=== Employee misconduct ===
In 2018, LAPPL defended the actions of Kevin Ferguson, an LAPD officer who had fired his gun at teenagers in Anaheim while he was off-duty. The Los Angeles Board of Police Commissioners found that Ferguson actions violated LAPD policy, and Ferguson subsequently resigned.

=== Influence in local elections ===
Between 2010 and 2020, LAPPL has directly contributed over $100,000 to Los Angeles City Council candidates, while its independent expenditure committees, which are not subject to donation limits, have spent millions of dollars. During the 2013 Los Angeles mayoral election, LAPPL-sponsored committees spent over $1.5 million backing Eric Garcetti's mayoral opponent.

In the lead-up to the March 2020 Los Angeles County District Attorney election, LAPPL contributed over US$1,000,000 (equivalent to $1,244,053 in 2025) to two separate political action committees in order to defeat George Gascón, a reform-minded candidate running for the office of Los Angeles County District Attorney. During the election, law enforcement unions, including LAPPL, had instead contributed over 75% of the $2.2 million raised by incumbent District Attorney Jackie Lacey. Lacey ultimately lost the race, despite broad financial support from law enforcement unions.

As of June 2020, 11 of the 15 incumbent City Council members have received LAPPL donations. Opponents have argued that such campaign donations distorted elected officials' decision-making, and has prompted incumbent council members like David Ryu to return these campaign contributions back to LAPPL.

=== 2020 LAPD budget ===
Amid the ongoing COVID-19 recession and a projected budget deficit that the city of Los Angeles faces, LAPPL argued for a continued need for the city government to adopt a FY 2020–2021 budget that allocates $1.857 billion to LAPD, the single largest line item in the city's proposed budget. The prior year, in 2019, LAPPL had negotiated a 4.8% pay raise for LAPD officers effective July 1, 2020, in addition to an "education bonus" payout of $41 million (equivalent to $51.63 million in 2025) to LAPD officers with college degrees, effective April 2020. The total impact of these negotiated pay raises was expected to add $123 million to the city's budget, contributing to the forecasted reversal of the city's projected revenue surplus into deficits "between $200 and $400 million in each of the next four years."

In the wake of the George Floyd protests, the size of LAPD's planned budget has received significant widespread scrutiny and public outcry. On June 5, 2020, Garcetti publicly announced his intention to reduce LAPD's budget by up to $150 million, a reversal from his prior budget, which had proposed an increase of 7% to LAPD's budget, including the aforementioned package of negotiated raises and bonuses for LAPD officers. The following day, LAPPL officials denounced Garcetti's plans to cut LAPD spending and characterized him as "unstable," with the LAPPL vice president Jerretta Sandoz characterizing Garcetti's announcement as "one of the most craven, disingenuous political sleights of hands we have seen in some time." LAPPL officials also announced they had no intention of renegotiating the pay raises.

== Affiliations ==
LAPPL is affiliated with the National Association of Police Organizations (APO), the California Coalition of Law Enforcement Associations (CCLEA), Southern California Alliance of Law Enforcement (SCALE), and United Coalition of Public Safety (UCOPS). It is also informally affiliated with BIG 11, representing the 11 largest sworn law enforcement associations in California, and with BIG 50, comprising the 50 largest law enforcement associations in the United States.

== Finances ==
LAPPL is a 501(c) organization. In 2019, the union had US$11 million in revenues, and US$16 million in assets. LAPPL also runs a political action committee dubbed the Los Angeles Police Protective League Issues PAC.

== See also ==
- Los Angeles Police Department
- Association for Los Angeles Deputy Sheriffs
