= 2018 Los Angeles County Board of Supervisors election =

2018 Los Angeles County Board of Supervisors elections

3 of the 5 seats of the Los Angeles County Board of Supervisors
	Majority party	Minority party
Party	Democratic	Republican
Seats before	4	1
Seats won	2	0
Seats after	4	1
Seat change	Steady	Steady
- Results of the elections: Democratic hold No election

The 2018 Los Angeles County Board of Supervisors elections were held on June 5, 2018. Two of the five seats (for the First and Third Districts) of the Los Angeles County Board of Supervisors were contested in this election.

== Results ==
=== First District ===
1st District supervisorial election, 2018
Candidate	Votes	%
Hilda Solis	158,471	100
Turnout	{{{votes}}}	%
Total votes	158,471	100.00

=== Third District ===
3rd District supervisorial election, 2018
Candidate	Votes	%
Sheila Kuehl	197,852	75.51
Eric Preven	36,618	13.97
Ralph Pacheco	27,570	10.52
Turnout	{{{votes}}}	%
Total votes	262,040	100.00
