= Association for Los Angeles Deputy Sheriffs =

Police union of the Los Angeles County Sheriff's Department

- Founded: February 1970
- Headquarters: 2 Cupania Cir; Monterey Park, CA 91755
- Location: Los Angeles County, California
- Members: 8,200 (2016)
- Key people: Ronald Hernandez, President; James Wheeler, Vice President
- Publication: The Dispatcher
- Website: alads.org

The Association for Los Angeles Deputy Sheriffs (ALADS) is one of two police unions for the Los Angeles County Sheriff's Department (LASD) officers,

ALADS represented 8,200 deputies and district attorney investigators in 2006.

== History ==
ALADS was founded in February 1970 by 10 deputies. In 1976, ALADS was certified to represent Bargaining Unit 0611, composed of sworn officers of Los Angeles County.

In 1999, a splinter union, the Los Angeles Sheriff's Professional Association (LASPA), was formed, due to disagreements with ALADS over providing greater public transparency of ALADS documents, including financial statements, employee and attorney contracts, and expense records.

In 2009, ALADS partnered with Los Angeles Police Protective League, the LAPD union, to form a political action committee (PAC) called the California Law and Order Independent Expenditure Committee. ALADS also operates a PAC called the Association for Los Angeles Deputy Sheriffs PAC.

In 2014, a power struggle within ALADS over illegitimate power grabs and misuse of union funds led to the splintering of ALADS. Armando Macias, who held the position of ALADS president, was accused of withdrawing $100,000 from the union's PAC.

== Leadership ==
As of 2020, ALADS is led by Ronald Hernandez, President, and James Wheeler, Vice President.

== Controversies ==
ALADS has successfully prevented the Sheriff’s Department from disclosing information from deputies’ personnel records to the public. The union also took the department to court in 1991 and 2009 to prevent efforts to expedite the administrative review of officer-involved shootings. ALADS sued the department in 2009 to stop a reform that would have allowed investigators to simultaneously pursue administrative reviews and criminal proceedings for officer-involved shootings.

In the 2018 election, ALADS spent US$1.32 million supporting the election bid of Alex Villanueva, over incumbent sheriff Jim McDonnell. This was despite Villaneuva's former backing of an ALADS splinter group.

In the lead-up to the March 2020 Los Angeles County District Attorney election, LAPPL contributed over $800,000 to a political action committees in order to defeat George Gascón, a reform-minded candidate running for the office of Los Angeles County District Attorney. During the election, law enforcement unions, including ALADS, had instead contributed over 75% of the $2.2 million raised by incumbent District Attorney Jackie Lacey. Lacey ultimately lost the election.

== Finances ==
ALADS is registered as a 501(c)(5) non-profit organization. In 2017, ALADS had a total revenue of US$11,086,219 and total assets of $33,107,777.

== See also ==
- Los Angeles County Sheriff's Department
- Los Angeles Police Protective League
- Police unions in the United States
