= Alex Villanueva =

Los Angeles County Sheriff from 2018 to 2022

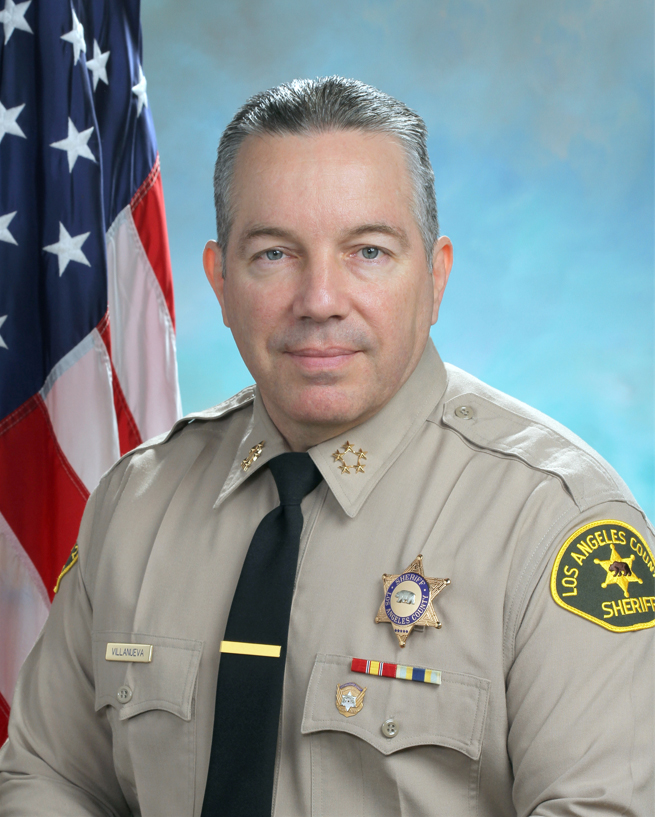
- Official portrait, 2019

33rd Sheriff of Los Angeles County
- In office December 3, 2018 – December 5, 2022
- Preceded by: Jim McDonnell
- Succeeded by: Robert Luna

Personal details
- Born: 1963 (age 62–63) Chicago, Illinois, U.S.
- Party: Democratic (before 2025); Republican (2025–present)
- Spouse: Vivian Villanueva
- Children: 1
- Education: San Bernardino Valley College (AA); Excelsior College (BLS); California State University, Northridge (MPA); University of La Verne (DPA)
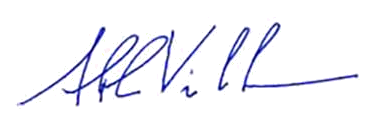
- Signature
- Police career
- Country: United States
- Department: Los Angeles County Sheriff's Department
- Service years: 1986–2022
- Rank: Sheriff (2018–2022); Lieutenant (2011–2018); Sergeant (2000–2011); Deputy Sheriff (1986–2000)
- Military career
- Allegiance: United States
- Branch: United States Air Force; California Air National Guard; California Army National Guard
- Service years: 1983–1993
- Rank: 1st Lieutenant

Alejandro "Alex" Villanueva is an American former law enforcement officer who served as the 33rd sheriff of Los Angeles County, California from 2018 until 2022. He defeated incumbent sheriff Jim McDonnell in the 2018 L.A. County sheriff's race, making him the first to unseat an incumbent in over 100 years. Before becoming sheriff, he was a lieutenant with the Los Angeles County Sheriff's Department.

The first member of the Democratic Party to be elected sheriff in 138 years, Villanueva campaigned as a reformer and appealed to some progressive values, but has received notoriety for more conservative policies during his tenure, as well as high levels of corruption. Villanueva lost his bid for reelection in 2022 by a wide margin of 61.3% to 38.7% against former Long Beach Police Department chief Robert Luna. He became a Republican in 2025. Villanueva would run again for sheriff in 2026, but was again defeated by Luna, by an even greater margin of 70% to 30%.

== Early life and education ==
Villanueva was born in Chicago, Illinois in 1963 to a Puerto Rican father and Polish-American mother. His family moved to Rochester, New York at an early age. When Villanueva was nine years old, his family moved to Aguadilla, Puerto Rico, where he learned Spanish and walked to school while reading books along the rural back roads beside sugar cane fields.

He began his college education while in Puerto Rico and earned an associate degree in Liberal Arts from San Bernardino Valley College in California in 1986 and a Bachelor of Liberal Studies from the University of the State of New York, Regents College, now known as Excelsior College. Villanueva then earned a Master of Public Administration from California State University, Northridge and a Doctorate of Public Administration from University of La Verne. Villanueva's dissertation was on the subject of leadership diversity in law enforcement.

== Military service ==
Villanueva served in the United States military for 10 years. After graduating from high school in Puerto Rico, Villanueva enlisted in the United States Air Force and later in the California Air National Guard from 1983 to 1985. He was stationed at Norton Air Force Base in San Bernardino, California and March Air Force Base in Riverside, California. It was at this time that Villanueva was a Senior Airman in the USAF and was hired by the Los Angeles County Sheriff's Department. Villanueva remained in the military, however, for another seven years, serving in the California Army National Guard from 1985 to 1992 where he was commissioned and served as 1st Lieutenant (2nd Battalion, 144th Field Artillery Regiment, 40th Infantry Division).

== Los Angeles County Sheriff's Department (1986–2018) ==
Villanueva joined the Los Angeles County Sheriff's Department in 1986 and eventually settled in La Habra Heights, California. After completing the Sheriff's Academy (Class 232), Villanueva was assigned to the Inmate Reception Center, the processing center for the Sheriff's Department's jail system.

In 1988, Villanueva initiated the drive to ban smoking in the Los Angeles County jail system as part of a national effort to ban second-hand smoke. The ban was implemented in 1990.

He patrolled the community of East Los Angeles, California and volunteered to lead one of the first community policing teams in the nation as permitted by the Community Oriented Policing Services (COPS) grant program launched by President Bill Clinton. The team Villanueva led was located at the Maravilla Housing Project.

After his time at East Los Angeles Sheriff Station, Villanueva transferred to the Training Bureau where he served as a Drill Instructor at the Los Angeles Sheriff's Department Academy. He was promoted to the rank of Sergeant, where he worked Lennox and Carson Sheriff Stations, the Community College Bureau, as well as the Advanced Officer Training unit. Villanueva was promoted to the rank of Lieutenant and served at the Century Regional Detention Facility, which primarily houses female inmates. In 2014, Villanueva moved on to the Pico Rivera Sheriff Station, where he served as Watch Commander. Villanueva retired from the Sheriff's Department in 2018.

From 2006 to 2010, Villanueva was an adjunct professor of criminal justice at California State University, Long Beach.

== Sheriff of Los Angeles County (2018–2022) ==
Villanueva was sworn into office as sheriff on December 3, 2018.

=== Elections ===
In 2012, the ACLU exposed widespread abuses in the Los Angeles Sheriff's Department, prompting an FBI investigation. Sheriff Lee Baca, Undersheriff Paul Tanaka, and numerous other department employees were caught in the scandal and were later convicted of various federal charges. Former Long Beach Police Chief Jim McDonnell was elected Sheriff in 2014, with the expectation he would fix the problems. However, Villanueva, then close to retirement, stated that he decided McDonnell had failed to restore trust, saying "everyone expected Jim McDonnell to clean house. But he didn't do that." McDonnell removed only a few upper-rank staff, instead focusing on catching lower-rank personnel in infractions. Villanueva called it "management by gotcha."

==== 2018 primary election ====
Villanueva announced his campaign for sheriff of Los Angeles County on June 28, 2017, promising to "reform, rebuild and restore" the Los Angeles County Sheriff's Department by "reforming the organization around the principles of community policing and ethical standards of conduct." He competed against incumbent Sheriff McDonnell and retired Commander Bob Lindsey. Villanueva received 33% of the vote, to McDonnell's 47%, and Lindsey's 19%. Villanueva and McDonnell advanced to the general election runoff.

==== 2018 general election ====
Villanueva won the general election on November 4, 2018, with 53% to 47% for McDonnell. Villanueva was the first person in 104 years to unseat a sitting sheriff of Los Angeles County. Though the election is non-partisan, he was also the first Democrat to win the sheriff's seat in 138 years. He claims to be "a Democrat of the party of JFK and FDR."

==== 2022 general election ====
Villanueva lost his bid for reelection in 2022 to Robert Luna by a margin of 61% to 39%. The race focused on issues that included alleged deputy gangs, lack of oversight, and allegations of internal harassment and retaliation against purported whistleblowers.

=== Hiring ===
Villanueva inherited a department that was understaffed by at least 1,300 personnel. According to an op-ed Villanueva wrote, he hired 1,100 deputies in his first year and banned the recruitment and hiring of out of state applicants for deputy sheriff, believing deputies should reflect the communities they will serve.

He has described 80% of the LASD as "Conservative and far right".

==== Accountability and transparency ====
Numerous bodies in Los Angeles County and California have clashed with Villanueva over the accountability of the Sheriff's office. Following several occasions during which the sheriff refused to appear before them, the Sheriff Civilian Oversight Commission called on Villanueva to resign in October 2020. In January 2021, California Attorney General Xavier Becerra launched a civil rights investigation of the LA County Sheriff's Department which sought to determine whether the LASD has engaged in a pattern or practice of unconstitutional policing, following allegations of excessive force, retaliation, and other misconduct.

In 2022, an LASD commander filed legal papers accusing Villanueva of obstructing an investigation into a 2021 incident where a police deputy kneeled on a handcuffed inmate’s head, as well as retaliating against whistleblowers. In response, Villanueva held a press conference and presented a graphic with arrows linking an LA Times reporter, a political rival, and the sheriff department's inspector general, stating that all were subject to a probe, later clarifying on Twitter that the reporter was not being criminally charged.

==== Deputy gangs ====
The Los Angeles County Sheriff's Department has a long history with deputy gangs, some of which have been accused of violence. One of the most prominent such groups is the "Banditos" at East Los Angeles Sheriff Station. On his first day in office, Villanueva removed the captain of East Los Angeles Sheriff Station and transferred 36 deputies away from the station. Ultimately, 22 deputies were suspended for misconduct and four were terminated. Despite this, reports have surfaced from organizations like the RAND Corporation that deputy gangs persist, documenting at least four groups in the Sheriff's Department that still remain active as of 2021. In 2022, an investigation was launched into alleged gang activity within the LASD, by Inspector General Max Huntsman.

=== Incidents ===
==== Tiger Woods car crash ====
Within hours of Tiger Woods’ February 2021 crash in Rolling Hills Estates, Sheriff Villanueva announced that the crash was purely an accident. Woods was traveling twice the speed limit in the middle of a clear day when he totaled the SUV he was driving. He had an empty, unlabeled pill bottle in the vehicle. No blood or alcohol tests were performed at the scene of the accident nor at the hospital. Villanueva stated he was not under the influence of any substance, and so no tests were warranted.

==== Death of Kobe Bryant ====
In January 2020, former Los Angeles Lakers basketball player Kobe Bryant, his daughter Gianna, and seven others were killed in a helicopter crash in Calabasas, California. Within several weeks, the department learned that a deputy at the scene had shared a photo of the accident scene with an unauthorized person at a local bar. Department policy at the time did not prohibit such an act. Villanueva created a new policy to ban such behavior, and supported Assembly Bill 2655 also known as 'The Kobe Bryant Act of 2020'. The purpose of the bill was to ban and criminalize unauthorized taking or distribution of photos at accident scenes by first responders.

==== COVID-19 pandemic ====
During the COVID-19 pandemic, Villanueva declined to enforce vaccine requirements for LASD staff.

==== Heliport ====
Department officials conducted a threat assessment in August 2020 to identify risks to the sheriff's safety. They began work on an emergency helicopter landing pad on private property above his home in 2021 to be able to quickly extract him. County attorneys received a cease-and-desist letter from Southern California Gas that owned the property and had not given written consent for the grading and installation of the landing pad. A lawyer for the department stated “This activity was without the authorization or approval of SoCalGas, for which SoCalGas would be entitled to damages for trespass and inverse condemnation”. The department also did not seek a required permit from the state for construction of an emergency use helipad.

=== Reforms ===
==== Body cameras ====
In September 2020, Villanueva secured $35 million in funding from the Los Angeles County Board of Supervisors to implement a body-worn camera program across the Los Angeles County Sheriff's Department. Though the LASD was one of the first law enforcement agencies in the nation to test body-worn camera technology, prior sheriffs had failed to implement such a system.

==== Removing immigration agents from Los Angeles County jails ====
Villanueva directed the removal of federal immigration agents from Los Angeles County jails, court facilities, and patrol stations. During his 2018 campaign, Villanueva promised to end the "pipeline to deportation", which he described as being built upon the sheriff's department's cooperation and financial ties with federal immigration authorities. In August 2018, Villanueva instituted a permanent moratorium on transferring undocumented immigrants to Immigration and Customs Enforcement.

From 2005 to 2018, the Los Angeles County Sheriff's Department and Board of Supervisors accepted $122,189,627 from the United States Government in exchange for a database of inmates without proof of valid immigration status. Villanueva suspended the department's participation in this program immediately after taking office, describing the cash payments as "blood money".

== 2024 Los Angeles County Board of Supervisors election ==
On September 12, 2023 Villanueva announced his candidacy for the Los Angeles County Board of Supervisors, challenging incumbent Janice Hahn. In his announcement, Villanueva blamed the board of supervisors for neglecting their "responsibility to provide for the health, safety and welfare of the county". He lost the race to Hahn in the March 5th Primary by a margin of 28.1% to 57.8%.

== Personal life ==
Villanueva is married to Vivian Villanueva, who retired from the Los Angeles County Sheriff's Department in 2018 after 25 years of service. They have one child.

== Bibliography ==
- Leadership Diversity in Law Enforcement (2005; dissertation)
- In Pursuit of Equity and Excellence in Law Enforcement Leadership ("Leadership in Education Corrections and Law Enforcement: A Commitment to Excellence, A. Normore & B. Fitch eds., Emerald Group Publishing, 2011)
- Police Exams and Cheating: The Ultimate Test of Ethics ("Law Enforcement Ethics: Classic and Contemporary Issues", B. Fitch ed., Sage Publications, 2014)
- Anatomy of an Organizational Train Wreck: A Failed Leadership Paradigm ("The Dark Side of Leadership: Identifying and Overcoming Unethical Practices in Organizations", A. Normore & Jeffrey Brooks eds., Emerald Group Publishing, 2017)

Police appointments
Preceded by Jim McDonnell	Los Angeles County Sheriff	Succeeded by Robert Luna
