= Anna Slotky =

American attorney and former actress

- Occupations: Actress, attorney
- Years active: Acting: 1990–2000; Law: 2009–present
- Spouse: James Reitano (m. 2011)

Anna Slotky Reitano (née Slotky) is an American attorney and former actress. She is perhaps best known for her role as Ruth Ann in the television sitcom The Torkelsons.

== Career ==
=== Acting ===
She starred as Ruth Ann in the show The Torkelsons, had a recurring role as Denise on Sister, Sister, and guest starred on 3rd Rock from the Sun, Doctor Doctor and Step by Step. She also played Brooke, one of the McCallister children, in Home Alone (1990) and Home Alone 2: Lost in New York (1992). Her last acting credit was a guest appearance on the Fox series Get Real in 2000.

=== Law ===
She was admitted to the State Bar of California in 2009, and is currently working as a public defender for Los Angeles County. She is a leading candidate for Judge of Los Angeles County having made it into the runoff election in November 2022.

== Personal life ==
Slotky married animator James Reitano on April 30, 2011.

== Filmography ==
Film and television
Year	Title	Role	Notes
1990	Doctor Doctor	Emily Linowitz	"Who's Afraid of Leona Linowitz?", "The Last Temptation of Mike"
1990	Home Alone	Brooke McCallister	
1991–92	The Torkelsons	Ruth Ann Torkelson	Regular role
1992	Home Alone 2: Lost in New York	Brooke McCallister	
1995–96	Sister, Sister	Denise Mondello	Recurring role
1996–97	3rd Rock from the Sun	Cheryl	"Body & Soul & Dick", "Romeo & Juliet & Dick"
1997	Step by Step	Amanda Dank	"Poetic Justice"
2000	Get Real	Allison	"Falling from Grace"
