= Jim McDonnell (sheriff) =

American law enforcement officer

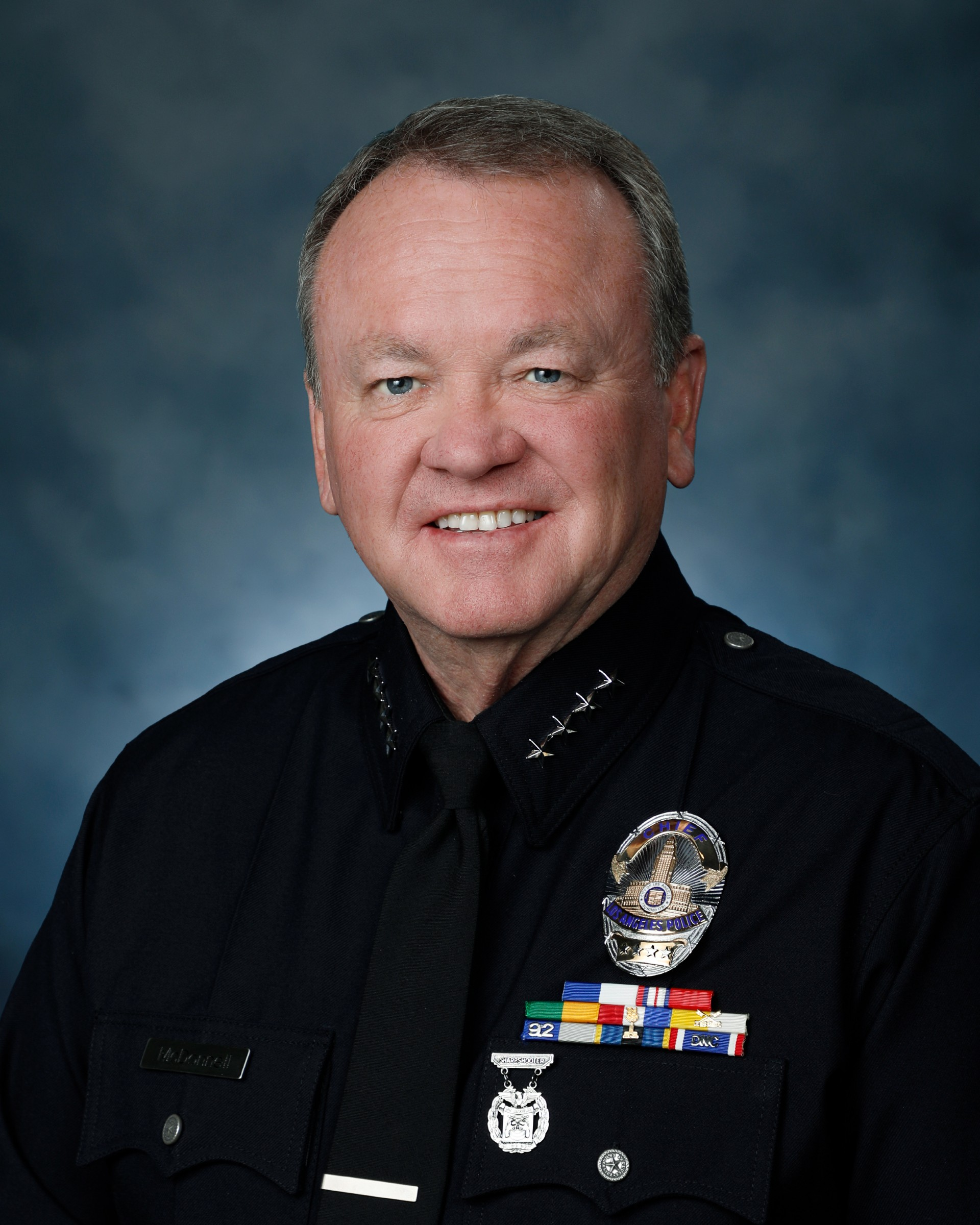
- Official portrait, 2024

59th Chief of the Los Angeles Police Department
- Incumbent
- Assumed office November 8, 2024
- Mayor: Karen Bass
- Preceded by: Dominic Choi (Interim)

32nd Sheriff of Los Angeles County
- In office December 1, 2014 – December 3, 2018
- Preceded by: John Scott (Interim)
- Succeeded by: Alex Villanueva

Chief of Police of Long Beach Police Department
- In office March 13, 2010 – November 22, 2014
- Preceded by: Anthony Batts
- Succeeded by: Robert Luna

Personal details
- Born: August 26, 1959 (age 66) Brookline, Massachusetts, U.S.
- Spouse: Kathy McDonnell
- Children: 2
- Education: Saint Anselm College (BS); University of Southern California (MPA)
- Police career
- Department: Los Angeles P.D. (2024–Present); L.A. County Sheriff's Department (2014–2018); Long Beach P.D. (2010–2014); Los Angeles P.D. (1981–2010)
- Service years: 2024–Present (Los Angeles P.D.); 2014–2018 (L.A. County S.D.); 2010–2014 (Long Beach P.D.); 1981–2010 (Los Angeles P.D.)
- Rank: Sheriff; Long Beach Police Department Chief of Police; LAPD Deputy Chief; LAPD 1st Assistant Chief; LAPD Commander; LAPD Captain; LAPD Lieutenant; LAPD Detective I-III; LAPD Police Officer I-III
- Awards: Los Angeles P.D. Medal of Valor; L.A. Police Distinguished Service Medal; LAPD 1987 Papal Visit Ribbon; LAPD 1992 Civil Disturbance Ribbon; LAPD 1994 Earthquake Ribbon; LASD Distinguished Service Medal

James McDonnell (born August 26, 1959) is an American law enforcement officer who has been the 59th Chief of the Los Angeles Police Department since November 8, 2024.

He is the former sheriff and head of the Los Angeles County Sheriff's Department, the largest in the US, having been elected as L.A. County's 32nd sheriff on November 4, 2014, defeating former Undersheriff Paul Tanaka. He replaced interim Sheriff John Scott on December 1, 2014. Scott replaced former Sheriff Lee Baca (who was also in federal prison). McDonnell was defeated for re-election as Sheriff in 2018 by Alex Villanueva.

Previously, McDonnell served as the Chief of Police in Long Beach, California from 2010–2014, and before that, he had served in various positions in the Los Angeles Police Department from 1981–2010, including First Assistant Chief, the second-highest position in the department.

== Early life and education ==
McDonnell grew up in a working-class neighborhood in Brookline, Massachusetts. He graduated from Saint Anselm College in Goffstown, New Hampshire, where he received a Bachelor of Science in criminal justice. He then received a Master of Public Administration (M.P.A.) from the University of Southern California.

== Career ==
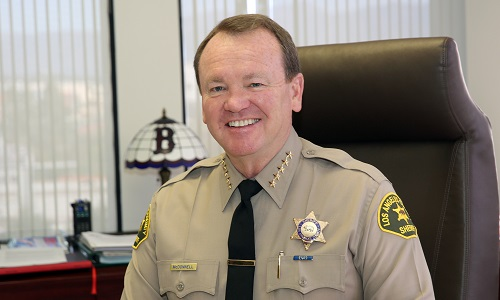
McDonnell in 2015

=== LAPD ===
McDonnell began his law enforcement career as a 21-year-old graduate from the Los Angeles Police Academy in 1981. During his 28 years of work in the LAPD, he held every rank except Chief of Police and served as second in command to Chief William Bratton. He was considered a frontrunner for the position in 2009 to replace Bratton, but Deputy Chief Charlie Beck was appointed instead. While at the LAPD McDonnell was viewed as an ambassador who helped the department connect with Los Angeles' diverse communities and political leaders as Bratton's chief of staff and second-in-command. As a candidate for Chief in 2002, McDonnell presented a plan for community-based policing that was eventually adopted by Bratton and served as the foundation to overhaul and reform the LAPD. While working for the LAPD, he held a variety of assignments in patrol, detectives, vice, gang, organized crime, homicide and other divisions. In the 1990s as a commander, he gained attention for his efforts to revitalize the LAPD's senior lead officer program and to build the LAPD forerunner to the Compstat computer crime-mapping system along with helping implement the consent decree. On November 8, 2024, he was sworn in as the 59th Chief of the Los Angeles Police Department. During his tenure, the June 2025 Los Angeles protests occurred and resulted in over 400 arrests and the California National Guard being deployed.

=== LBPD ===
After losing the LAPD Chief's job to Charlie Beck, McDonnell in March 2010 was appointed as the police chief of Long Beach, California, replacing former Chief Anthony Batts, who left to become the chief of the Oakland Police Department. This occurred over objections by some in the department who preferred a chief from within the Long Beach Police Department and, indeed, a career LBPD officer would succeed McDonnell. As police chief, McDonnell oversaw a large increase in officer-involved shootings and a 20% decrease in sworn officers from 1,000 to 800.

Violent crime also fell during McDonnell's tenure and he has received credit for improving community relations with the police, reducing gang activity, and trying to improve racial diversity in the department. After McDonnell's election on November 4, 2014, Deputy Chief Robert Luna was selected to replace him to become the 26th Police Chief of Long Beach. Luna was considered a frontrunner for the position before McDonnell was appointed and became the department's first Latino police chief.

=== LASD ===
McDonnell expressed support for a civilian oversight commission to supplement the new inspector general in monitoring the department but has stated that he is still evaluating whether the inspector general should have subpoena power and access to personnel records. He was sworn in on December 1, 2014, and became the first person from outside of the sheriff's department to be elected to the office of Sheriff in over 100 years. McDonnell lost his 2018 reelection bid to Alex Villanueva, who in turn would lose a 2022 reelection bid to Robert Luna, who had been McDonnell's successor as Long Beach police chief.

Sheriff primary results, June 3, 2014
Candidate	Votes	%
Jim McDonnell	340,682	49.35
Paul Tanaka	104,192	15.09
Bob Olmsted	67,855	9.83
James Hellmold	52,953	7.67
Patrick L. Gomez	45,276	6.56
Todd S. Rogers	41,855	6.06
Lou Vince	37,458	5.43
Total votes	690,271	100
Turnout	{{{votes}}}	14.31%

November 2014

Sheriff runoff results, November 4, 2014
Candidate	Votes	%
Jim McDonnell	920,655	74.83
Paul Tanaka	309,641	25.17
Total votes	1,230,296	100
Turnout	{{{votes}}}	27.07%

== Dates of rank ==
Promotions
Insignia	Rank	Agency	Date	Notes
	Chief	Los Angeles Police Department	November 8, 2024 – present	
	Sheriff	Los Angeles County Sheriff's Department	December 1, 2014 – December 3, 2018	
	Chief	Long Beach Police Department	March 13, 2010 – November 21, 2014	
	Deputy Chief	Los Angeles Police Department	November 2009 – March 13, 2010	
	Assistant Chief	Los Angeles Police Department	November 10, 2002 – November 2009	
	Commander	Los Angeles Police Department	December 31, 2000 - November 10, 2002	
	Captain	Los Angeles Police Department	March 15, 1998 - December 31, 2000	
	Lieutenant	Los Angeles Police Department	October 31, 1993 - March 15, 1998	
	Sergeant II	Los Angeles Police Department	November 6, 1988 - October 31, 1993	
	Detective III	Los Angeles Police Department	until November 6, 1988	
	Detective II	Los Angeles Police Department		
	Detective I	Los Angeles Police Department	March 1, 1987	
	Police Officer III	Los Angeles Police Department		
	Police Officer II	Los Angeles Police Department		No rank insignia, badge shown.
	Police Officer I	Los Angeles Police Department	June 29, 1981	No rank insignia, badge shown.

== Policies ==
In January 2026, McDonnell announced that he plans to override state and local bans forbidding federal law enforcement officers from wearing masks.

== Personal life ==
McDonnell is married to Kathy McDonnell. They have two daughters.

Police appointments
Preceded by Anthony Batts	Chief of Long Beach Police Department	Succeeded by Robert Luna
Preceded by John Scott; Interim	Los Angeles County Sheriff	Succeeded by Alex Villanueva
