= Robert Luna =

American law enforcement officer, Sheriff of Los Angeles County

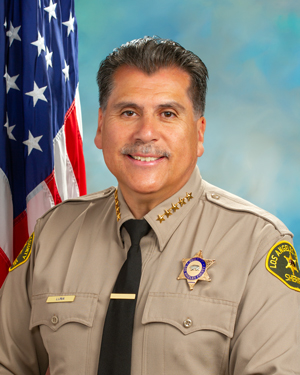
- Official portrait, 2022

34th Sheriff of Los Angeles County
- Incumbent
- Assumed office December 5, 2022
- Preceded by: Alex Villanueva

Chief of the Long Beach Police Department
- In office November 22, 2014 – December 31, 2021
- Preceded by: Jim McDonnell
- Succeeded by: Wally Hebeish

Personal details
- Born: East Los Angeles, California, U.S.
- Party: Democratic
- Other political affiliations: Republican (formerly)
- Children: 2
- Education: Long Beach City College; California State University, Long Beach
- Police career
- Department: Long Beach Police Department; Los Angeles County Sheriff's Department
- Service years: 1985–present
- Rank: Sheriff

Robert G. Luna is an American law enforcement officer who has served as the sheriff of Los Angeles County since 2022. He previously served as chief of the Long Beach Police Department from 2014 to 2021, before defeating Sheriff Alex Villanueva in the 2022 election.

== Early life ==
Luna was born and raised in East Los Angeles to Mexican immigrant parents and has said that his early experiences with deputies patrolling his neighborhood shaped his view of law enforcement. He graduated from Santa Fe High School in Santa Fe Springs in 1984. After high school, he went on to graduate from Long Beach City College, where he met Long Beach Police Sergeant Mike Woodward and decided to pursue becoming a law enforcement officer. He would later obtain a master's degree in public administration from California State University, Long Beach.

== Career ==
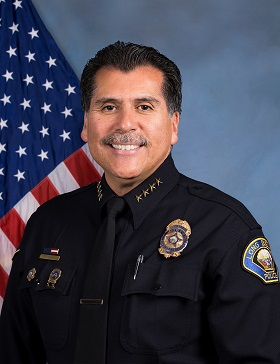
Luna as Long Beach Police Chief in 2016.

=== Long Beach Police Department ===
In 1985, he joined the Long Beach Police Department and served as a patrol officer and on the SWAT team and was named as the Deputy Chief in 2006. In November 2014, Luna was appointed as the 26th Chief of the Long Beach Police Department, succeeding Jim McDonnell who had become the Sheriff of Los Angeles County. In September 2021, Luna announced that he would retire in December of that year.

Luna was criticized by small business owners, local officials, and other LBPD officers for his handling of the George Floyd protest in Long Beach on May 31, 2020, as part of the nationwide demonstrations against police brutality. Soon after the protest, the Long Beach Police Department banned the use of sleeper holds, a type of chokehold that restricts blood flow to the brain, which had specifically come under scrutiny during the protests. Luna stated that it was the "first of many steps" in building trust with the community.

=== Los Angeles County Sheriff ===
In December 2021, Luna entered the race for the 2022 Los Angeles County Sheriff election, challenging incumbent Alex Villanueva alongside a crowded field of candidates. In the primary election, Luna scored second place in the election, putting him against Villanueva in the general election with endorsements from the seven defeated candidates. In the general election, Luna beat Villanueva to become Sheriff, with Villanueva conceding on November 15, 2022. Luna was sworn in as Sheriff on December 5, 2022.

Police appointments
Preceded by Jim McDonnell	Chief of the Long Beach Police Department; 2014–2021	Succeeded by Wally Hebeish
Preceded by Alex Villanueva	Los Angeles County Sheriff; 2022–present	Incumbent
