= Robert Norris (sheriff) =

Sheriff of Kootenai County, Idaho

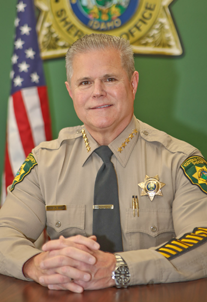
- Norris in 2021

13th Sheriff of Kootenai County, Idaho
- Incumbent
- Assumed office January 1st, 2021
- Preceded by: Ben Wolfinger

Personal details
- Born: November 3, 1963 (age 62)
- Party: Republican
- Other political affiliations: Non-affiliated
- Education: Long Beach State University
- Website: www.kcsheriff.com www.sheriffnorris.com
- Nickname: Bob Norris

Robert Brian Norris is the 13th Sheriff of Kootenai County, Idaho. He is known for his role in the February 2025 physical removal of Teresa Borrenpohl from a legislative town hall which became a cause célèbre.

Norris became sheriff in 2020, running as a Republican and having defeated independent candidate Mike Bauer in the 2020 Kootenai County Sheriff race, making him the first Kootenai County Sheriff with no prior connection to the Kootenai County Sheriff's Office (KCSO). In 2024, he was re-elected after defeating challenger Dan Wilson. Before becoming Sheriff, he served as a lieutenant with the Los Angeles County Sheriff's Department.

== Career at the LASD ==
During Norris's career at the Los Angeles County Sheriff's Department (LASD), his assignments included patrol, custody, narcotics, gangs, investigations, counter-terrorism, and emergency preparedness.

Following the September 11 attacks, Norris was selected to lead a team at the newly established Joint Regional Intelligence Center (JRIC) to assist the United States during the war on terror. He held a security clearance for sensitive compartmented information and was responsible for managing personnel and resources from local, state, and federal agencies: FBI, CIA, and the U.S. Attorney's Office. While established at JRIC, Norris was selected to train in Israel with Mossad and Shin Bet. Upon his return, he was promoted to lieutenant at the LASD by former Los Angeles Sheriff and convicted felon Lee Baca.

After his career at the LASD and his move to North Idaho, Norris volunteered with the Kootenai County Search and Rescue team from 2017 to 2019.

== Kootenai County Sheriff ==
Norris was appointed to the office on January 1, 2021, after his predecessor left early. He was appointed unanimously by the Kootenai County Board of County Commissioners (BOCC). His appointed term lasted ten days, from January 1 to January 10, 2021. He was officially sworn in as the elected Kootenai County Sheriff on January 11, 2021.

=== Reform ===
Norris has annually sought an increase in the Sheriff's department budget. Since the start of his term in 2021, the Sheriff's department budget, as of 2024, has seen an 18.91% increase.

Since 2022, the Sheriff's department, in partnership with the non-profit Kootenai County Regional Air Support, has been authorized to operate a helicopter to support regional search and rescue missions, as well as other first responder operations.

=== Concerns and incidents ===
==== Traffic stop pepper spray incident ====
In Norris's first month as the Kootenai County Sheriff, a viral video showed him pulling out pepper spray while talking to a man who was recording a traffic stop. The video showed Brad Nelson, a citizen of Kootenai County, asking questions regarding a traffic stop. After Nelson got close enough so a Sheriff Lieutenant and Norris could hear his questions, Norris approached Nelson and asked him to step back. Nelson was apprehensive and told Norris, "Shut the fuck up and get back to work." Norris stepped closer, threatening to use his pepper spray, which ended the confrontation.

Norris later issued a press release in the Coeur d'Alene Press, stating, "The idea of local citizens using their video cameras with the intention of harassing our officers and interfering with their duties, only to later portray us online as if we were in the wrong, contributes to this national disgrace."

==== COVID-19 pandemic ====
During the COVID-19 pandemic, he released multiple press statements saying that he would not enforce COVID-19 guidelines or mask mandates.

==== Unauthorized removal of books ====
In 2023, Norris claimed that books with explicit sexual content were available to teenagers in local libraries, specifically citing the books Deal With It! A Whole New Approach to Your Body, Brain, and Life as a Gurl and Identical. Norris argued that these books generally violated Idaho state law and should be placed in an area for adult library patrons only.

Norris's unauthorized removal of two books and his refusal to return them drew public attention to the county. The Community Library Network (CLN), which operates the Post Falls library, defended the books following Norris's actions, noting that they are classified as young adult non-fiction. CLN also clarified that minors require parental or legal guardian permission to sign up for a library card.

The CLN had and continues to have a process in place for people to request that the library reconsider the materials it makes available to youth.

==== Pennie Collinson defamation claim ====
In July 2024, photographer Pennie Collinson, who had worked for Norris's 2020 election opponent during his 2022 primary campaign for county clerk, filed a notice of tort claim against Norris personally, seeking over $500,000 in defamation damages. She alleged that during an April 2024 campaign event, Norris made derogatory sexual remarks about her and her photography business.

After the defendants, Norris and Kootenai County, failed to respond to the initial tort claim, Collinson was able to file a lawsuit in October 2024. The lawsuit accuses Norris of slander, defamation, placing her in a false light, and causing emotional distress. Addressing the lawsuit once more in a sheriff's office news release, Norris reaffirmed his stance, describing the claim as politically motivated and promising to contest what he termed "a hoax". He offered a $10,000 reward to members of the public who could assist with defending himself from the personal lawsuit, issuing his statement on the official sheriff's office letterhead and posting it on the office's Facebook page.

The Spokesman-Review reported the response of Fred Scheffelmaier, owner of the Country Barn Bed and Breakfast in Cataldo, who hosted the forum where Norris allegedly made his statements. Scheffelmaier expressed shock at what Norris said, saying, "Why would you call someone something like that in a public meeting?"

His use of official sheriff's office resources to address personal allegations raised concerns regarding the legality of his actions, prompting inquiries to state agencies for clarification on potential campaign finance violations.

==== ICE detainee surge ====
In January 2025, under Norris's leadership, the Kootenai County Jail saw a sharp rise in out-of-state detainees held for U.S. Immigration and Customs Enforcement, particularly from states where laws limit law enforcement cooperation with federal immigration authorities. Norris attributed this spike to the Trump administration’s executive orders on immigration enforcement and the passage of the Laken Riley Act.

Kootenai County receives $112 per day per detainee under a federal contract. These financial incentives raised concerns that the increase in ICE detainees was artificially manufactured.

Norris defended his office’s cooperation with federal authorities, stating that the focus remains on "criminal aliens" and that he views the Sheriff's Office working with ICE and Border Patrol as a necessity for keeping the community safe. He has offered the department's resources to assist with deportations.

==== Removal of woman from meeting ====
In February 2025, during a legislative town hall at Coeur d’Alene High School organized by the Kootenai County Republican Central Committee (KCRCC), Teresa Borrenpohl, a local activist and Democratic politician, was physically restrained and removed from the meeting after causing a disruption by heckling over the potential repeal of Idaho's Medicaid expansion.

According to The Spokesman-Review, KCRCC chair Brent Regan claimed that Borrenpohl and others had shouted "six or seven times" as lawmakers spoke, and had received "three" verbal warnings to stop interrupting before the town hall continued after each interruption.

Norris first attempted to remove Borrenpohl from her seat himself, grabbing her arms. After his attempts failed, he appears to order three men from the private security firm LEAR Asset Management to physically remove Borrenpohl from the meeting. Norris denied giving the men any specific direction and, along with the KCRCC, claimed “no knowledge” of the security arrangements. However, Regan stated later that “nothing was done without him (Norris) being aware.” In a separate comment to The New York Times, Regan claimed that the security team "volunteered their services" as the KCRCC sought additional security due to a bomb threat made against state Republican lawmaker Jordan Redman, who was in attendance.

As two of the three men dragged Borrenpohl out, she repeatedly screamed, “Who are these men?” “This man is assaulting me!” and “Where is your badge?” Meanwhile, Norris was heard yelling at bystanders to stop recording and telling Borrenpohl, “You, out, now.”

Coeur d’Alene Police Chief Lee White, who has legal jurisdiction over the location, has since condemned the incident, citing the First Amendment. White refused to arrest Borrenpohl or trespass her from the town hall, contrary to Norris's demands. Based on White's recommendations, Coeur d’Alene prosecutors dropped the misdemeanor battery citation against Borrenpohl for allegedly biting the hand of one of the men who forcibly removed her, and the city of Coeur d’Alene has revoked the security company’s business license.

Days after the incident, Undersheriff Brad Nelson released the first official press statement from the Sheriff's Office regarding the incident on social media platforms. The statement claimed that there were "NO Kootenai County Deputy Sheriff's or other personnel present at or involved in this incident." Similarly, the Coeur d’Alene School District, which rented the facility to the KCRCC, stated in an online media release that the facility use agreement signed by the KCRCC required them to hold a public use forum. The district also disavowed Norris and Regan’s characterization of the event as a “private event,” which the KCRCC used to justify removing Borrenpohl. The Coeur d’Alene School District has condemned the incident.

In April 2025, Coeur d'Alene city prosecutors filed misdemeanor criminal charges against five men affiliated with the private security firm, based on a police recommendation. The recommended charges include battery against Borrenpohl and three other individuals, as well as false imprisonment of Borrenpohl and Gregory Johnson, and "violations of security agent duties and uniform requirements". While city police identified Norris as an involved party, they stated that the legality of his actions remains "to be determined". According to public records, one of the latter claimed in an appeal that “LEAR Asset Management was under a direct lawful order by Sheriff Norris they could not lawfully refuse.” Despite this, Norris continues to deny any knowledge of the security arrangements and did not file a report concerning the incident.

As of April 2025, Norris is represented by attorney Kinzo Mihara, while Borrenpohl is represented by attorney Wendy Olson, who filed a notice of tort claim seeking $5 million in damages with the Kootenai County Clerk, alleging that Norris and those acting with him violated Borrenpohl’s constitutional rights. In August 2025, Johnson also filed a tort claim notice against Kootenai County and Norris, seeking $2.5 million in damages for alleged violations related to his involvement in the incident.

In November 2025, Raul Labrador, through the Idaho Attorney General’s Office, concluded the state's review and declined to file any criminal charges, including battery, against Norris, stating that no charges were warranted based on the "evidence".

In early December 2025, misdemeanor charges were dismissed against four of the five security guards involved, including the battery and false imprisonment counts.

The civil tort claims by Borrenpohl and Johnson remain ongoing, with no reported resolutions.

==== Revocation of special deputy status for local police chiefs ====
In December 2025, it was reported that Norris had unilaterally revoked the special deputy privileges of White, Dave Hagar, and Rathdrum Police Chief Dan Haley, according to public records. The revocations were outlined in a letter sent to the three officers, which provided no explanation for the action and required them to surrender their identification cards to the Sheriff's Office later in December 2025.

White said of the revocation that Norris was throwing a “temper tantrum” and alleged that it stemmed from the three officers' roles in investigating Norris's conduct during the removal of woman from meeting controversy. Although Norris was mentioned in the resulting police reports, he was not designated as a suspect. Haley had previously led the town hall investigation as a detective with the Coeur d'Alene Police Department before becoming Rathdrum's chief in October 2025.

White, in a comment to the CDA Press, said, “I’m just hoping the sheriff calms down.”

== 2020 Kootenai County Sheriff race ==
=== Campaign ===
==== Primary race ====
In late 2018, Norris announced his candidacy for Kootenai County Sheriff. Several potential Republican sheriff candidates, including KCSO Captain Kim Edmondson, businessman John Grimm, former U.S. prosecutor Scott Jones, former house representative John Green, and retired Texas officer Richard Whitehead, all announced their campaigns shortly after one another.

On July 11, 2019, Jones officially dropped out of the sheriff's race and announced the next day that he intended to endorse Norris. Captain Kim Edmondson and businessman John Grimm joined the race as moderate Republicans. Former Sheriffs Ben Wolfinger, Rocky Watson, and Pierce Clegg publicly supported Edmondson's campaign, as she was the only candidate with law enforcement experience within the KCSO.

As the primary election drew closer, the race for Sheriff became more aggressive politically; one campaign was even under investigation by the FBI. The sheriff primary appeared much more divisive than previous ones, with a record amount of money being spent. Though Wolfinger agreed with that sentiment, he also noted that this hadn't been the first time a sheriff's election had become so polarized.

Norris won with nearly 3,000 more votes over Edmondson, making him the official Republican candidate for Sheriff.

==== General election ====
Mike Bauer, a former captain at the LASD, filed his paperwork for Kootenai County Sheriff in the spring of 2019. Many speculated about his reasons for joining the already crowded race and filing with a non-partisan affiliation, despite formerly being registered as a Republican. In an interview Bauer did, when asked why he was running for Sheriff, he said, "I'm not – impressed with the four candidates that are running, especially one that seems to have a – unverified background." Bauer's campaign had proof that Norris had donated $600 to Paul Tanaka’s Mayor of Gardena campaign. Bauer claimed that this donation had proved Norris was involved in the LASD pay-to-play scandal, in which Tanaka had worked with former L.A. Sheriff Lee Baca to promote those who had donated to Tanaka’s mayoral campaign. While Norris did receive a promotion within the department where he worked, it came six years after the original donation.

During the heat of the 2020 campaign, Bauer leveraged the fact that Norris had worked under convicted felon Sheriff Baca, posting documents and photographs with the previous sheriff, Sherman Block, whom Norris had never worked for. Aware that Bauer had also worked under Baca, Norris contacted L.A. Sheriff photographer Jaime Lopez and requested access to Bauer's personnel file, claiming that Bauer had suffered a flood and needed assistance restoring lost documents and images. In reality, there had been no flood; Norris was attempting to obtain photographs showing Bauer and Baca together.

At the end of the Bauer campaign, Bauer had received notable endorsements from Spokane County Sheriff Ozzie Knezovich and previous Kootenai County Sheriff Pierce Clegg. Bauer also boosted support for a non-partisan sheriff's office, which the Kootenai County BOCC would soon consider after the general election. In 2022, the BOCC's decision not to move forward with optional forms of county government, including an appointed sheriff, was made.

Justin Nagel, a carpenter and Kootenai County native, decided to file as well. He campaigned as the only "born and raised" Idahoan candidate in the race for Kootenai County Sheriff. He ran on the Libertarian ticket and received just over 8,000 votes in the general election.

=== 2020 Election results ===
Official Results from the Kootenai County Clerk's Office are shown. Sheriff candidates are listed individually below if they received more than 0.1% of the overall vote.

2020 General Kootenai County Sheriff Race
Party	Candidate	Votes	%
Republican	Robert "Bob" Norris	56,938	68.02%
Independent	Mike Bauer	18,702	22.34%
Libertarian	Justin Nagel	8,070	9.64%

Official Results from the Kootenai County Clerk's Office

2020 Primary Kootenai County Sheriff Race
Party	Candidate	Votes	%
Republican	Robert "Bob" Norris	9,931	44.27%
Republican	Kim Edmondson	6,011	26.80%
Republican	Richard "Rick" Whitehead	4,192	18.69%
Republican	John Grimm	2,298	10.24%

== 2024 Kootenai County Sheriff race ==
=== Campaign ===
==== Primary election ====
Norris won the 2024 Kootenai County Republican primary election for sheriff, securing another victory over Bauer. Norris attributed his strong margin of victory to his efforts in improving the sheriff's office. Bauer, running for the position for the second time, acknowledged the shifting political landscape in the county and expressed respect for Norris's electoral success, viewing the outcome as a reflection of the public's opinion on Norris’s leadership, despite Bauer's significant private and public reservations.

==== General election ====
Norris faced three independent challengers in November 2024: Kyle Woodward, Dan Wilson, and returning third-party challenger Justin Nagel. Woodward, a college student and the youngest candidate in the 2024 Kootenai County General Election at 23 years old, filed his paperwork in March 2024. His campaign focused on protecting constitutional rights and opposing the use of Automated License Plate Readers. Nagel, once more, emphasized his status as the only candidate "born and raised" in Idaho, also filed in early March.

Wilson, who initially filed as a Republican candidate for sheriff in the May primary before withdrawing, re-entered the race in March as an independent candidate under the slogan "Liberty without Compromise." His campaign highlighted concerns similar to those raised in the 2020 Bauer campaign, including issues with Norris's LACERA disability claim, alleged corruption, and Norris's career with the LASD.

In response to these claims, Norris held a town hall where he addressed many of the allegations posed by Wilson. He mentioned his LACERA disability rating and defended his payments. He also addressed allegations involving Kootenai County Commissioner and his former campaign manager, Bruce Mattare, whom Wilson claimed had unauthorized access to information in law enforcement databases. Norris countered by presenting a public records request, which indicated no record of Mattare holding credentials for database access. However, this did not disprove that Mattare may have had access to the data Wilson alleged, given his special deputy status—a role granted by Norris that Mattare holds as the only elected official in the county with such status. Norris also addressed long-standing accusations about his alleged involvement with the Lynwood Vikings, a white supremacist sheriff gang, firmly stating that he is not a member of "any secret society."

Although Wilson spent a similar amount on his campaign as Norris did during the 2024 general election cycle, he still did not achieve a higher vote percentage than Bauer had in 2020. Wilson refused to concede, falsely suggesting Kootenai County electoral fraud.

Wilson, though, did manage to prevent Norris from reaching 70% of the vote once more.

=== 2024 Election results ===
Official results from the Kootenai County Clerk's Office are shown. Sheriff candidates are listed individually below if they received more than 0.1% of the overall vote.

2024 General Kootenai County Sheriff Race
Party	Candidate	Votes	%
Republican	Robert "Bob" Norris*	61,853	68.94%
Independent	Dan Wilson	19,609	21.86%
Independent	Justin Nagel	4,295	4.79%
Independent	Kyle Woodward	3,965	4.42%

Official Results from the Kootenai County Clerk's Office.

2024 Primary Kootenai County Sheriff Race
Party	Candidate	Votes	%
Republican	Robert "Bob" Norris*	22,695	80.85%
Republican	Mike Bauer	5,376	19.15%
