= Lynwood Vikings =

Los Angeles-based deputy gang

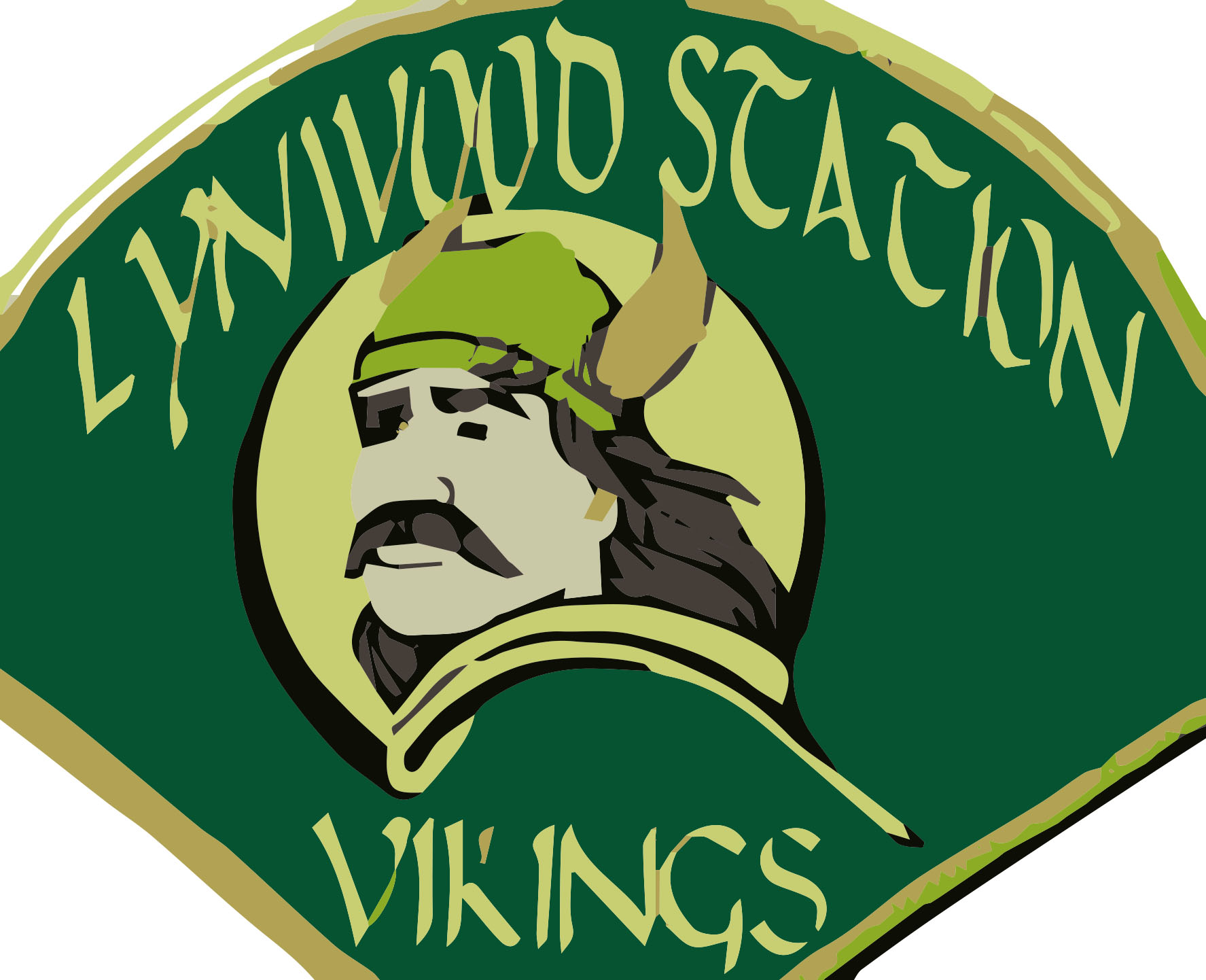
- Logo of the Lynwood Vikings
- Founding location: Los Angeles County Sheriff's Department
- Years active: 1980s-2010s
- Territory: Los Angeles
- Criminal activities: Police corruption
- Allies: Compton Executioners

The Lynwood Vikings is one of several deputy gangs of the Los Angeles County Sheriff's Department (LASD). The Vikings, formerly based at the now-defunct Lynwood station, are composed of sworn deputy sheriffs in the LASD.

Members of the Vikings have included Deputy LA Sheriff Paul Tanaka. Federal judge Terry J. Hatter Jr. described the Vikings as a "neo-Nazi, white supremacist gang" engaged in racially motivated hostility. The 1992 Kolts Commission report stated there was a lack of evidence of racist deputy gangs, but some Viking deputies engaged in often racially biased-related brutality and gang-like activity. Other sources have described the Vikings as a social organization.

== Background ==
The first deputy gang in the Los Angeles County Sheriff's Department (LASD), the Little Devils, was founded at the East L.A. Station in 1971 and had an overwhelmingly white membership among deputies who patrolled African American and Latino communities. The Lennox-based Grim Reapers and the Century Station-based Regulators are more recent gangs. Other LASD gangs have included the Hats, the Jump Out Boys, the 2000 Boys, and the 3000 Boys.

The 1992 Kolts Commission on police brutality found that cliques like the Vikings were found especially in areas of Los Angeles with large minority populations, but did not "conclusively demonstrate the existence of racist deputy gangs." Former Sheriff Lee Baca, while objecting to police gang behaviors, has stated that banning them would be unconstitutional.

== History ==
The Vikings are considered one of the earliest and most notorious of LASD deputy gangs. Among the Viking tattoos is the symbol "998," which stands for "officer-involved shooting," indicating that the officer has shot someone. Former LASD under-sheriff Jerry Harper described the 998 tattoos as "a mark of pride." Lynwood station possessed a map of the district in the shape of Africa, and its walls held racist cartoons depicting black men.

In 1988, one year after joining the Vikings, deputy Paul Tanaka was named in a wrongful death suit that the LASD settled for almost $1 million; the case involved Tanaka's shooting of a young Korean man. In the following year, Baca sent Captain Bert Cueva, an officer of Latin American ancestry, to "stamp out this Viking phenomenon;" Cueva was unsuccessful however and left his post in 1992.

The Vikings first rose to prominence in 1990, when misconduct litigation accused the LASD and its clubs of racism and racist violence. Lawyers suing the LASD stated that their clients were beaten, shot or harassed, and demanded to know if alleged perpetrators had Vikings tattoos on their ankles.

Deputy Mike Osborne told the Los Angeles Times that invitation to join the Vikings was considered prestigious, but also meant "you keep your mouth shut and obey the code of silence" about illegal activity by other deputies. In 1996, Osborne and his wife deputy Aurora Mellado retired after testifying about police corruption. Their home was later shot at by what Osborne believes were disgruntled sheriff's deputies.

In 1996, Judge Hatter ordered that the LASD pay $9 million in fines for lawsuits caused by the Vikings. Sheriff Sherman Block opposed the judge's decision, calling it "irrational and wrong," and stated that no evidence existed demonstrating that the Vikings was a racist group. When Baca confronted deputies about Viking membership in 1997, LASD superiors cautioned him against angering officers and provoking a backlash.

In 2011, Francisco Carillo Jr., a prisoner accused and convicted 20 years earlier of murder, sued the LASD and one of its deputies, Craig Ditsch, saying he had been framed by the Lynwood Vikings. Carrillo complained that the deputy and fellow Vikings had intimidated a key witness into making false statements. He was released in 2013, after witnesses recanted.

== See also ==
- Rampart scandal
