= Paul Tanaka =

American politician and law-enforcement officer (born 1959)

Paul K. Tanaka

Undersheriff of the Los Angeles County Sheriff's Department
- In office June 2011 – August 1, 2013
- Preceded by: Larry L Waldie

Assistant Sheriff of the Los Angeles County Sheriff's Department
- In office January 7, 2005 – June 2011 Serving with R. Doyle Campbell
- Succeeded by: Marvin O. Cavanaugh and Cecil W. Rhambo

Mayor Pro Tem of Gardena
- In office March 2003 – April 2004

Mayor of Gardena
- In office March 2005 – April 2016

Personal details
- Born: 1959 (age 66–67) Gardena, California, U.S.
- Spouse: Valerie Tanaka
- Education: Loyola Marymount University (B.A. Accounting)
- Criminal status: Released
- Conviction(s): Conspiracy, obstruction of justice
- Penalty: 5 years in federal prison
- Website: www.paultanaka.com

Paul K. Tanaka (born 1959) is an American former politician, and former law enforcement officer who served with the Los Angeles County Sheriff's Department until his conviction in 2016. He was convicted April 4, 2016, in Federal Court of conspiracy to obstruct justice and obstruction of justice. Tanaka served as Undersheriff of Los Angeles County from 2011 to 2013. He was also mayor of the City of Gardena, California. His tenure has provoked controversy due to allegations of violence, corruption, and alleged membership in the Lynwood Vikings, a deputy gang, which was described as a "neo-Nazi, white supremacist gang" by a federal judge.

== Personal life ==
Tanaka was born at the Queen of Angels Hospital in Los Angeles. At the age of 7, he and his family moved to Gardena, where he lived for 47 years.

Tanaka received an accounting degree from Loyola Marymount University and was also a Certified Public Accountant. He served as Chief Financial Officer for the Go For Broke Foundation and the East West Players, and served on the board of the Harriet Buhai Center for Family Law.

Tanaka was married to Valerie Tanaka, with whom he has 2 children.

== Elected official ==
Tanaka was active in local government since his election to the Gardena city council in March 1999. In March 2005, he was elected mayor with 62% of the vote. He was re-elected to a second term in 2009.

== Law enforcement ==
A career law enforcement officer, Tanaka initially joined the El Segundo police department in 1980. Transferring to the LA County Sheriff's Department (LASD) two years later, he rose through the ranks, earning his stripes in 1987, and making lieutenant in 1991. Tanaka then rose from lieutenant to captain in 1999, commander in 2001 and chief in 2002. From January 7, 2005, to June 2011, he was an assistant sheriff. He is the first Japanese American in the position.

He has been criticized for his affiliation with the Lynwood Vikings, a secret police organization, brought to light amidst police misconduct litigation in 1990, which a federal judge described as a "neo-Nazi, white supremacist gang." Tanaka is of Japanese descent. Sheriff Lee Baca acknowledged Tanaka still has a tattoo related to the group. Tanaka was tattooed as a member of the Vikings deputy gang in 1987, while serving as a sergeant at the Lynwood station.

On March 7, 1988, Tanaka was involved in a controversial killing of a Korean American in Long Beach, sparking outrage among Korean American community leaders. Hong Pyo Lee was shot and killed by Tanaka and four other deputies following a car chase. The deputies said Lee tried to run them over. The deputies were later found to have been justified in shooting by the district attorney’s office.

== Los Angeles County Undersheriff (2011-2013) ==
Tanaka was appointed Undersheriff, the second-in-command at the Los Angeles County Sheriff's Department in June 2011 by Sheriff Lee Baca. During his 2-year term as Undersheriff, the Department was dogged with several controversies. He announced his resignation on March 6, 2013.

=== Controversies ===
On October 18, 2011, at a Board meeting, Supervisors Zev Yaroslavsky and Mark Ridley-Thomas held a motion to create a Citizens’ Commission on Jail Violence with the mandate of reviewing the nature, depth and cause of Sheriff’s deputies’ inappropriate use of excessive force in County jails and to recommend corrective actions. In early 2011, the FBI launched an undercover probe at the Men's Central Jail, to investigate allegations of corruption and abuse. The U.S. Department of Justice's civil rights division also launched a wide-scale pattern and practice investigation into allegations that Antelope Valley deputies discriminated against minority residents who receive government housing assistance.

During Tanaka's tenure as Undersheriff, the American Civil Liberties Union filed a federal class-action lawsuit against Sheriff Lee Baca and top commanders, including Tanaka, for perpetuating a long-standing, widespread pattern of violence by deputies against inmates in the county jails.

In September 2012, the Citizens’ Commission on Jail Violence issued a final report that is very critical of the Sheriff Department’s management, including Baca, Tanaka and other executive-level staff, accusing them of fostering a culture in which deputies beat and humiliated inmates, covered up misconduct and formed aggressive deputy cliques in the county jails. Tanaka was in charge of the Department's Patrol Division and its budget. The report also called for the removal of Tanaka from the chain of command supervising the jail system, for statements that Tanaka had delivered, indicating that deputies could use excessive force against prisoners and that aggressive behavior would not result in discipline. The report also noted that Tanaka had accepted campaign contributions from many department employees, furthering perceptions of patronage and favoritism in promotion and assignment decisions.

On March 6, 2013, Tanaka announced that he would retire as the Undersheriff, effective August 1, 2013, during an ongoing federal probe conducted by the FBI into widespread allegations of abuse, misconduct and mismanagement in County jails. Although his decision to resign was portrayed as being under his volition, Baca told Tanaka to step down because Tanaka had become a political liability.

=== Plot to hide informant ===
The plot to derail the federal investigation of the LASD supposedly began in August 2011, when sheriff's deputies retrieved a mobile phone from an inmate at Men’s Central Jail and were able to connect the phone to the FBI. Discovering that the inmate-turned-FBI informant was Anthony Brown, deputies had purposely hidden Brown from his FBI handlers, by moving him around different jails and changing Brown's name.

=== Criminal charges ===
On May 13, 2015, Tanaka was indicted on federal conspiracy and obstruction charges in the ongoing Los Angeles County Men's Jail corruptions investigation. Tanaka was the eighth LASD official to be criminally charged based on actions taken in the summer of 2011.

=== Conviction ===
On April 6, 2016, Tanaka was convicted on conspiracy and obstruction of justice charges by a federal jury in a case presided over by U.S. District Judge Percy Anderson. "The criminal charges centered on allegations that in 2011 Tanaka orchestrated a scheme to derail the FBI's jail investigation by intimidating the lead agent in the case, pressuring deputies not to cooperate and concealing the whereabouts of an inmate who was working as a federal informant." As a result, Councilman Mark E. Henderson was appointed Mayor Pro Tem and served as acting Mayor of Gardena until the March 2017 election.

=== Sentencing ===
On June 27, 2016, Tanaka was sentenced to five years in prison, for civil rights abuses inside the nation's largest urban jail system. He was also sentenced to serve two years of supervised release after he is discharged from prison and pay a $7,500 fine. He faced a maximum of 15 years in federal prison. Tanaka planned to file a motion to sidestep his August 1 jail surrender deadline, and remain out on bail while he appealed his conviction. He surrendered Monday, January 16, 2017, to federal authorities in Colorado, to begin serving the prison sentence at a minimum-security camp in Englewood, Colorado. He was released on April 19, 2021.

== 2014 Sheriff's campaign ==
On August 15, 2013, Tanaka announced his candidacy to unseat his former boss, Lee Baca, as the sheriff in the 2014 election. Tanaka lost the election to Jim McDonnell, McDonnell received 49.4 percent of the vote and Tanaka received 15.1 percent to come in second.

== See also ==
- Lee Baca, Sheriff over Tanaka, also convicted in relation to abuses in the jail system.
