= Skyknight (disambiguation) =

The Douglas F3D Skyknight is an American fighter aircraft introduced into service with the United States Navy in 1951.

Skyknight or Sky Knight may also refer to:

- Cessna 320, a turbocharged version of the Cessna 310 twin-engine monoplane, marketed as the Skyknight
- Sky Knight Helicopter Program, an airborne law enforcement program in Lakewood, California
- Skyknight (missile), a short-range surface-to-air missile
