= List of LASD deputy gangs =

Law enforcement gangs in Los Angeles County

This is a list of gangs whose members are associated with the Los Angeles County Sheriff's Department (LASD) (typically deputies). Press reports indicate the LASD has had a problem with gangs since at least the 1970s which has expanded to at least 18 gangs. The department has used the term "cliques" when discussing these groups.

The 1992 Kolts Commission report said these were found “particularly at stations in areas of high crime—the so-called ‘ghetto stations'—and deputies at those stations recruit persons similar in attitude to themselves.” The first deputy gang acknowledged by the LASD was the "Little Devils" in a later-released internal memo in 1973. One or more deputy gangs are believed to have been involved in the death of Los Angeles Times reporter and law enforcement critic Ruben Salazar during the National Chicano Moratorium March against the Vietnam War on August 29, 1970. No one was convicted nor even charged for this alleged crime.

In July 2021, U.S. Representative Maxine Waters called for a United States Department of Justice investigation into allegations that a violent deputy gang known as the Executioners was running the Compton station of the LASD.

A report released in early 2023 revealed that at least six deputy gangs remain active.

== List ==
- Banditos
- Buffalo Soldiers (African American Deputies Clique)
- Cavemen
- Compton Executioners
- Cowboys
- Grim ReapersThe Grim Reapers developed after the Arco Narco investigation.
- Industry Indians
- Jump Out Boys
- Little Devils
- Little Red Devils
- Lomita Lizards
- Lynwood Vikings
- Pirates
- Posse
- Rattlesnakes
- Regulators
- Spartans
- Tasmanian Devils
- The Leafs
- 3000 Boys
- 2000 Boys
- Temple Station V-Boys
- Wayside Whities
