= Gangs in the Los Angeles County Sheriff's Department =

Since the 1970s, several deputies of the Los Angeles County Sheriff's Department have formed internal gangs in which membership is exclusive to certain sheriff's deputies, often along ethnic lines, and requires certain acts, such as police violence (particularly against people of color), for initiation into said gang. Members are often tattooed and are expected to maintain the blue wall of silence (i.e. not snitch or report misconduct on or about other officers), fabricate evidence, engage in police corruption, and engage in criminal activity such as vandalism and homicide, among other things. Historically, almost all instances of deputy gang violence have either been ignored by the Los Angeles County District Attorney's Office or the office has stood by the members of the deputy gangs, alongside the tolerance or assistance of the county sheriff. Although not unique to the Los Angeles County Sheriff's Department, it suffers from the most prolific case of the existence of law enforcement gangs in the state.

== Definition of gang ==
Since 2022, California Penal Code § 13670 has defined a law enforcement gang as follows:

"Law enforcement gang" means a group of peace officers within a law enforcement agency who may identify themselves by a name and may be associated with an identifying symbol, including, but not limited to, matching tattoos, and who engage in a pattern of on-duty behavior that intentionally violates the law or fundamental principles of professional policing, including, but not limited to, excluding, harassing, or discriminating against any individual based on a protected category under federal or state antidiscrimination laws, engaging in or promoting conduct that violates the rights of other employees or members of the public, violating agency policy, the persistent practice of unlawful detention or use of excessive force in circumstances where it is known to be unjustified, falsifying police reports, fabricating or destroying evidence, targeting persons for enforcement based solely on protected characteristics of those persons, theft, unauthorized use of alcohol or drugs on duty, unlawful or unauthorized protection of other members from disciplinary actions, and retaliation against other officers who threaten or interfere with the activities of the group.

Additionally, via California Penal Code § 186.22, California has for decades defined a criminal gang as "an ongoing, organized association or group of three or more persons, whether formal or informal, having as one of its primary activities the commission of one or more of the criminal acts enumerated in subdivision (e), having a common name or common identifying sign or symbol, and whose members collectively engage in, or have engaged in, a pattern of criminal gang activity." The deputy gangs mentioned within this article purportedly meet the requirements of this section.

== History ==
The first known deputy gang to exist in the public eye was the "Little Devils", based out of the East Los Angeles sheriff's station. Deputies of that gang were responsible for violence against protesters during the National Chicano Moratorium March on August 29, 1970. Three years later, a list of 47 deputies with the red devil tattoo of the gang was compiled by Sheriff's Captain R.D. Campbell. By the late 1980s, another deputy gang called the "Cavemen" had formed within the East Los Angeles sheriff's station.

After the development of gangs at the East Los Angeles Station, gangs began to form in other places such as the Peter J. Pitchess Detention Center, where, in 1990, the existence of Wayside Honor Ranch gang, also known as the Wayside Whities, came to light. In contrast to deputy gangs which operated out of sheriff stations, those which operated at correctional facilities, such as the Wayside Whities and the 3000 Boys (which operates in the Men's Central Jail and emerged in the 2010s) often physically abused or tortured those in the custody of the sheriff, with objectives such as causing the hospitalization of the victim or the fracture of bones seen as desirable or necessary to be initiated into the deputy gang. The Wayside Whities are also known to have targeted people of color.

As of March 2022, there are at least 18 known deputy gangs within the Los Angeles County Sheriff's Department.

== Activities ==
Deputy gangs have been known to purposefully injure or kill civilians, plant or fabricate evidence, commit perjury, retaliate against deputies not in a gang or those who do not condone the actions of the gangs, and condone similar actions by other deputies, among other things. Some stations, such as the East Los Angeles Station, were essentially operated by a deputy gang. A lawsuit filed by eight deputies and the American Civil Liberties Union alleged that the Banditos "controls the East Los Angeles station like inmates running a prison yard." Promotions, working hours, and time off were also alleged to be determined by deputy gang leaders known as shot-callers.

Besides corruption, gangs have proliferated with a far greater prominence in correctional facilities. Such examples include gangs such as the 3000 Boys in the Men's Central Jail, named so due to the gang originated from deputies assigned to guard the 3000 level of the jail. The 3000 Boys may be the largest deputy gang within the Los Angeles County Sheriffs Department. Members of the deputy gangs are tattooed with a "III" on their calf (roman numeral for 3). The tattoo is earned from using excessive force against an inmate then filing a false report thereafter.

== Responses ==
In general, there has been little legislative action to resolve the proliferation of deputy gangs by the California State Legislature, nor has there been much action from the United States Department of Justice into the issue. The California State Senate and the United States Commission on Civil Rights have conducted hearings in the past about the issue of deputy gangs in Los Angeles County however. State law does require law enforcement agencies in the state to maintain policies which prohibit the existence of gangs within law enforcement agencies.

On July 21, 2021, Representative Maxine Waters requested the United States Department of Justice to investigate the existence and actions of the Compton Executioners.

In the 2021-2022 California State Legislature session, the legislature passed 2021-2022 Assembly Bill 958 (Gipson). The act requires all law enforcement agencies to enact a policy which prohibits the existence of and participation in law enforcement gangs in the state, and requires that participation in one of those gangs must be grounds for termination under department policy. The act also defined what a law enforcement gang is.

In March 2022, the Los Angeles County Sheriff Civilian Oversight Commission announced that it is investigating the prevalence of deputy gangs within the Sheriff's Department.

== See also ==
- List of LASD deputy gangs
