= Death of Mitrice Richardson =

Death of American woman

Mitrice Richardson
- Born: Mitrice Lavon Richardson; April 30, 1985; Los Angeles, California, United States
- Disappeared: September 17, 2009 (aged 24)
- Body discovered: August 9, 2010, Monte Nido, California, United States
- Education: California State University, Fullerton
- Occupations: Executive assistant, dancer
- Known for: Missing person from South Los Angeles, California, United States;

Mitrice Lavon Richardson (born April 30, 1985 – remains found August 9, 2010) was a 24-year-old African-American woman who went missing on September 17, 2009, after police claim she was released from a jail at the Malibu/Lost Hills Sheriff's Station, where she had been taken after behaving erratically at a restaurant. She was missing for 11 months before being found deceased in August 2010 by park rangers.

Richardson's parents have maintained that their daughter should never have been released on her own by the Los Angeles County Sheriff's Department, given her obviously disturbed condition. In 2011, the Richardson family settled the civil lawsuit with L.A. County privately for $900,000. In January 2017, the California Attorney General's office concluded an investigation into the circumstances surrounding Richardson's release from jail and decided not to bring charges against anyone involved in her release.

== Life and education ==
Mitrice Richardson was the daughter of Latice Trevon Sutton (September 27, 1967 — September 12, 2025) and Michael Richardson. She was raised by her mother and stepfather Larry Sutton in Covina, California.

Richardson obtained a Bachelor of Arts degree in psychology in 2008 from California State University, Fullerton, after graduating from South Hills High School in West Covina, California.

Richardson was an open lesbian, and at the time of her death, had been dating girlfriend Tessa Moon for about two years. She had also competed as a beauty pageant contestant, worked as an intern for a forensic psychologist and part-time as a dancer in an LGBT strip club.

== Disappearance ==
On the evening of September 16, 2009, Richardson entered the parking lot of Geoffrey's restaurant in Malibu. Due to what staff and patrons at the restaurant described as "bizarre" behavior and the fact that she was unable to pay her $89 bill, the Los Angeles County Sheriff's Department from the Malibu/Lost Hills Station was called to assess her condition. The officers on the scene purportedly administered a field sobriety test and determined that she was not intoxicated and not under the influence of any substance. She was arrested on charges of "suspicion of not paying for the meal" and possession of less than an ounce of marijuana.

According to the arresting officers, upon her arrest, her phone, purse and money were secured in her car and her car was towed to a tow yard on the Pacific Coast Highway. Richardson was detained and booked at the Malibu/Lost Hills Sheriff's Station approximately ten miles (16 km) up Malibu Canyon.

Although Richardson's mother informed the station of concern for her daughter's mental health, and despite promises from the station personnel that she would not be released until later in the morning, Richardson was released on September 17, 2009, at 12:28 AM with no belongings and no means of calling for assistance. Steve Whitmore, spokesman for the Los Angeles County Sheriff's Department, said Richardson was released from jail because: "She exhibited no signs of mental illness or intoxication. She was fine. She's an adult." She had been invited to wait in the lobby, but declined.

Several hours later, at 6:30 AM, she was seen in the backyard of former KTLA news anchor Bill Smith in Monte Nido. When Smith opened his window and asked if she was OK, Richardson told Smith that she was "resting." Smith then called the police.

== Searches ==
Site where Richardson's remains were found.

On January 9, 2010, four months after she was reported missing, the Los Angeles County Sheriff's Department conducted one of the largest-scale searches in the history of the department. Over 300 volunteers trained in search and rescue operations participated in the 18-square-mile (47 km^{2}) search in the area of Malibu Canyon. The search included both air and ground searches of creeks, trails, and ridges. Richardson was not found during this search.

Maurice Dubois, father of slain Escondido, California, teen Amber Dubois, assisted Richardson's family in a two-day search on June 5 and 6, 2010, in the Monte Nido area of Malibu Canyon. Over 100 private-citizen volunteers participated in the search of the area. Although Richardson's remains were not discovered, searchers found racially and sexually offensive graffiti on the walls of a culvert in the canyon. The graffiti was freshly painted and paint cans, brushes and other potential evidence were left at the scene.

The creek bed in Malibu Canyon where Richardson's naked mummified remains were eventually discovered is adjacent to a 21-acre (8.5 ha) ranch that is known for producing pornography. It is very secluded and has direct access to the creek bed. When her body was discovered, the detectives on the case removed her body against the order of the coroner. Though residents reportedly heard screams in that area several nights after Richardson disappeared, her death was deemed to not be a homicide; there was no foul play.

== Media coverage ==
Mitrice appeared on the cover of People magazine in November 2009.

Richardson's disappearance was covered on an episode of Disappeared on the Investigation Discovery channel, entitled "Lost in the Dark"; it first aired on November 19, 2012, as the season 6 premiere.

Richardson's disappearance is featured on Season 3 of the “Hell and Gone” podcast by journalist and private investigator Catherine Townsend, and on Episode #65 of the "My Favorite Murder" podcast (April 20, 2017 - "Pre-Milked Cereal").

== Lawsuits ==
Richardson's family has filed several lawsuits against the Los Angeles County Sheriff's Department for releasing her from jail even though, they claim, she was experiencing severe bipolar disorder at the time. In 2011, her parents, who had sued separately, were awarded $450,000 each. Richardson's girlfriend, Tessa Moon, refutes claims that Richardson had any mental illness.

Richardson's family also asked the California Attorney General's office to review the sheriff's office's handling of the case. In November 2015, after reviewing 500 pages of documents sent with the request, the office of California then-Attorney General Kamala Harris replied that it had not found any grounds for criminal charges against the sheriff or his deputies. The Attorney General's office also found no evidence that the sheriff's office had mishandled Richardson's family's complaint against it. However, in January 2016, the California Attorney General's office reversed itself and announced it was beginning a criminal investigation of the case.

On January 30, 2017, the California Attorney General's office concluded that there was insufficient evidence to support criminal prosecution of anyone involved in the handling of the case.

== See also ==
- Lists of solved missing person cases
- List of unsolved deaths
