= Ozzie Knezovich =

American politician and police officer (born 1963)

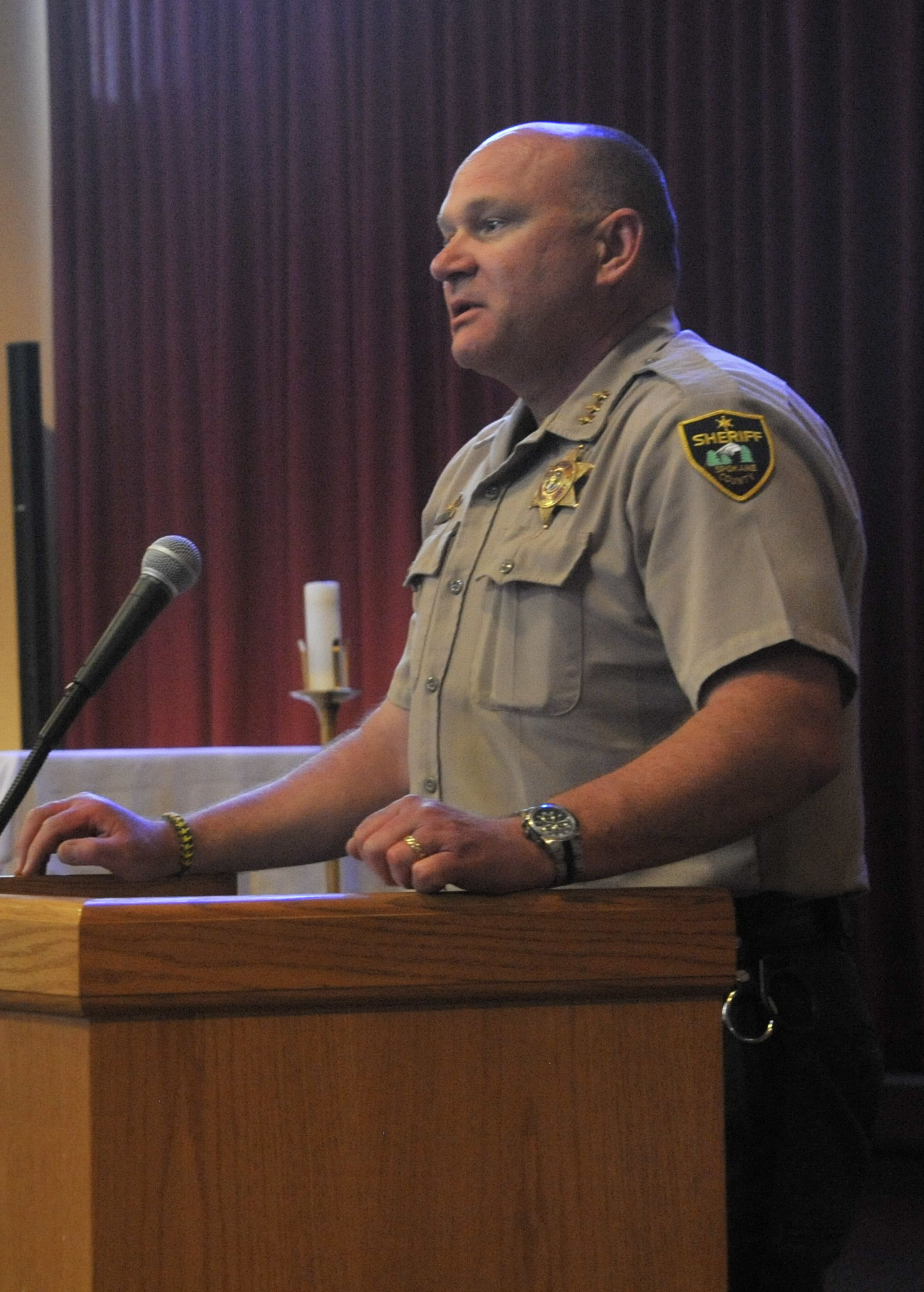
- Knezovich in 2014

Sheriff of Spokane County
- In office April 11, 2006 – December 31, 2022
- Preceded by: Mark Sterk
- Succeeded by: John Nowles

Personal details
- Born: March 30, 1963 (age 63) Wyoming, U.S.
- Party: Republican
- Education: Weber State University (BIS)

Ozzie Knezovich (/kəˈnɛzəvɪtʃ/ kə-NEZ-ə-vitch; born March 30, 1963) is an American politician and law enforcement official serving as a volunteer police chief of Superior, Wyoming. He served as sheriff of Spokane County, Washington from 2006 to 2022. Knezovich is a member of the Republican Party.

== Career ==
Following the resignation of Mark Sterk in 2006, Knezovich was appointed to complete his term as sheriff of Spokane County, Washington. Knezovich had worked with the Spokane County Sheriff's Office for ten years, but was considered an outsider candidate. The local Republican Party and the outgoing sheriff both endorsed Cal Walker, the Spokane Valley Chief of Police. Walker unsuccessfully ran against Knezovich in the Republican primary later that year.

During the 2016 presidential election, Knezovich supported Donald Trump, while questioning his quality as a candidate. Knezovich stated of the 2016 presidential candidates, "I look at it, and I say, 'Is this the best we can field?' It kind of speaks to the level of people that are willing to run for office anymore."

At a March 2017 political rally, Knezovich praised President Trump and blamed former president Barack Obama for violence committed against law enforcement officers. Knezovich told the crowd, "never in my history have we been hunted and assassinated, and I blame Barack Obama." Knezovich also accused Governor of Washington Jay Inslee of violating his oath of office by signing an executive order prohibiting state agencies from assisting in enforcement federal immigration laws. The Spokesman-Review later reported that murder of law enforcement officers reached historic lows during the Obama administration, and that Inslee's executive order did not apply to sheriff's departments. Knezovich stood by his remarks.

Following a school shooting at Freeman High School in Rockford, Washington in 2017, Knezovich held a press conference in which he blamed the media and elected officials for "a counterculture of violence, a culture that is enamored with school shooting." He also criticized violent video games and gang culture, while asserting that guns were not to blame. Knezovich had previously blamed the media and activists for violence following the 2016 shooting of Dallas police officers.

In 2020, during the Republican primary for Kootenai County, Idaho, which borders Spokane County, Knezovich endorsed Kim Edmondson for sheriff. Edmondson lost the primary election to Robert Norris. Knezovich did not endorse a candidate until September 2020, when he backed independent candidate Mike Bauer, believing Norris was unqualified. However, shortly after his endorsement, Knezovich withdrew his support for Bauer after receiving an email that had connected Bauer with Ammon Bundy. Bauer denied these claims.

On July 25, 2024, Knezovich was sworn in as the volunteer police chief for the town of Superior, Wyoming. He had previously been Superior's town marshal from 1990 to 1991. In May 2025, Knezovich helped lead state and local officials in an alleged drug trafficking case.

== Electoral history ==
=== 2006 ===
Spokane County Sheriff
Party	Candidate	Votes	%
Republican	Ozzie Knezovich*	112,485	75.4
Democratic	James Flavel	36,778	24.6
Total votes		149,263	100.0

=== 2010 ===
Spokane County Sheriff
Party	Candidate	Votes	%
Republican	Ozzie Knezovich*	135,540	100.0
Total votes		135,540	100.0

=== 2014 ===
Spokane County Sheriff
Party	Candidate	Votes	%
Republican	Ozzie Knezovich*	103,443	70.9
Republican	Doug Orr	42,416	29.1
Total votes		145,859	100.0

=== 2018 ===
In 2018, Knezovich was challenged for re-election by Scott Maclay, a respiratory therapist who had legally changed his name to DumpOzzie Dot Com in protest of the sheriff. Maclay had been a frequent critic of Knezovich and a regular attendee of Spokane Valley City Council meetings. Knezovich described Maclay as a "psychopath," and was quoted as saying, "I truly expect him to try to kill me."

After advancing to the general election, Maclay died in a motorcycle crash in Idaho. According to the Spokane County Auditor, his death occurred too close to the election to have his name removed from the ballot.

Spokane County Sheriff
Party	Candidate	Votes	%
Republican	Ozzie Knezovich*	176,793	86.18
Independent Party	DumpOzzie Dot Com	28,345	13.82
Total votes		205,138	100.0
