= Sky Knight Helicopter Program =

The Sky Knight Helicopter Program is an airborne law enforcement program in Lakewood, California which began service in 1966. The unit operates using non-sworn pilots, employed by the city of Lakewood, partnered with a sworn deputy sheriff from the Los Angeles County Sheriff's Department, Lakewood station using two Robinson R44 helicopters based at Long Beach Airport, and flies about 1,040 hours per year.

== History ==
The city of Lakewood, California, Sky Knight helicopter patrol program took form in June 1966 from a suggestion by Hugh MacDonald, former aviation unit chief of the Los Angeles County Sheriff's Department. MacDonald saw an immediate need to move airborne law enforcement from special operations toward routine patrols and aerial command. With the support of Sheriff Peter Pitchess, MacDonald chose the City of Lakewood as the best site to test the idea of a helicopter patrol program. The decision involved Lakewood city officials, Lakewood Sheriff's station Captain Ted von Minden, the Hughes Tool Company (Manufacturers of the 300B helicopters to be flown in the study), and the federal Law Enforcement Assistance Administration.

One of the first two pilots in the Sky Knight program was LA County Sheriff Deputy Richard E. Waldow. A resident of Long Beach, "Dick" Waldow was a perfect candidate for this pioneering law enforcement position, having already logged many hours of helicopter and fixed-wing flight experience while serving as a US Marine during the Korean War. REWaldow Sky Knight.jpg SkyKnight in the LA River.tiff

The results of the Sky Knight program were almost immediate. During the 18-month study, crime in Lakewood went down by 11 percent while it rose 9 percent in the rest of Los Angeles County during the same period. The program was so successful that it expanded to the other cities served by Lakewood Sheriff's station.

Sky Knight became the first airborne law enforcement program in the nation to fly regularly scheduled patrols. In a continued history of firsts, Sky Knight also employed the first female law enforcement pilot, Monica McIntyre.

== Present day ==
Today, Sky Knight is completely integrated within the sheriff's tactical operations. Lakewood partners with the city of Cerritos to participate in the Sky Knight program. The two cities also contract with the Los Angeles County Sheriff's Department for law enforcement services. Participating in the Sky Knight program gives the two cities a significant advantage over using the Sheriff's Aero Bureau because the response time is so much quicker. A sheriff's helicopter on patrol in the west part of the county can take 10–15 minutes, or more, to respond to an incident in the Lakewood area. Sky Knight can respond to calls in 2 to 3 minutes.

Sky Knight responds to every type of call encountered by normal deputy sheriffs on the ground. The unit assists by acting as an aerial command post coordinating everything from burglary or robbery in progress calls to vehicle pursuits.

== Notable Incidents ==
Sky Knight has handled some of the most noteworthy emergencies in the years since its inception.

=== Aeroméxico Flight 498 ===
In 1986, Sky Knight flew continuously over the scene of the crash of Aeroméxico Flight 498 in nearby Cerritos. Sky Knight was one of the first law enforcement units at the scene and the first to provide a comprehensive assessment of the disaster. As rescue efforts continued, Sky Knight pilot Monica McIntyre was given responsibility as on-scene air traffic controller, guiding medivac helicopters to the crash site, and positioning news media helicopters away from flight corridors. The Cerritos disaster was a spectacular example of Sky Knight's abilities as a command platform and observation post.

=== The 1991 San Gabriel Flood Control Channel Incident ===
In early 1991, as unexpected spring runoff poured through the region's flood control channels, Sky Knight rescued two boys who had been swept away while bike riding in the San Gabriel River bed. Landing downstream, Sky Knight Pilot Carl Cortez and his observer, Deputy George Collins, formed a human chain to pull the youngsters from the water. More than once the force of the flow nearly brought down both men as they struggled to rescue the two boys. Finally, they brought the exhausted and cold youngsters to safety. For their courage and quick thinking, pilot Cortez and observer Collins received the 1991 Lakewood Award of Valor.

== The 2003 Lakewood Gang Shooting ==
In 2003, following a gang shooting in Lakewood, Sky Knight pilot Monica McIntyre and L.A. Sheriff's tactical observer Deputy Dale Nowicki, responded to the area. Already a recognized patrol tactics expert, Nowicki quickly located the suspect vehicle as it fled the area towards an adjacent county (Orange County, CA). While McIntyre piloted the helicopter, Nowicki was able to coordinate the ground unit response and call the subsequent pursuit. Making this particular pursuit noteworthy was that for over two hours, this extended pursuit crossed numerous city and county law enforcement jurisdictions. Additionally, two helicopters from neighboring county jurisdictions responded to assist in the pursuit. Nowicki was able to seamlessly direct new lead units from all the different agencies, coordinate the additional air units, and maintain effective command and control, thus insuring the safety of the public and ground officers. The suspect was captured after he abandoned the vehicle and ran into a house. Nowicki directed ground units to the house, and after a barricaded suspect containment, the suspect was taken into custody. For his leadership, professionalism, tactical excellence, and calm communications, Nowicki received an Award for Exemplary Service from the City of Lakewood.
