= Sherman Block =

American police officer (1924–1998)

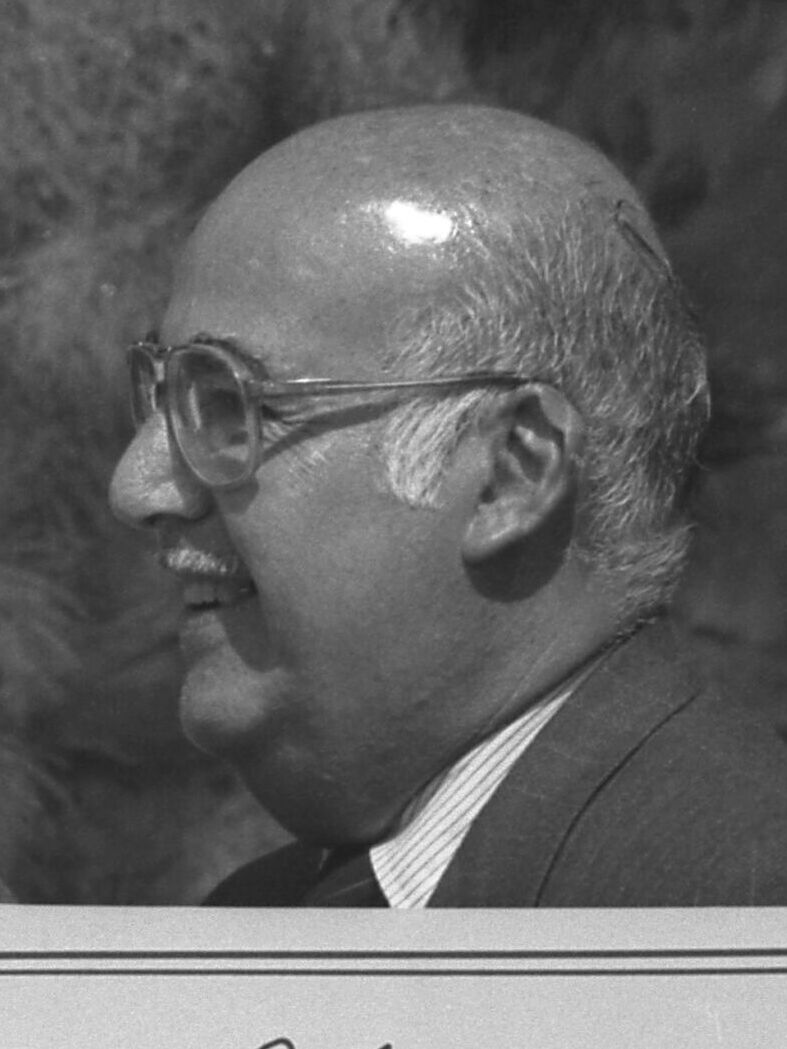
- Block in 1986
- Born: July 19, 1924; Chicago, Illinois, US
- Died: October 28, 1998 (aged 74); Los Angeles, California, US
- Education: Washington University in St. Louis
- Relatives: Berle Adams (cousin)
- Police career
- Department: Los Angeles County Sheriff's Department
- Service years: 1956–1998
- Rank: Sheriff

Sherman Block (July 19, 1924 – October 28, 1998) was the 29th Sheriff of Los Angeles County, California from January 1982 until his death. He was preceded by Peter Pitchess and succeeded by Lee Baca.

== Biography ==
Block was born to a Jewish family and grew up in Chicago. He was the grandson of Jewish immigrants from Eastern Europe. His grandfather had been a chazzan in Vilna. Block was raised in an Orthodox Jewish home. He served in the United States Army for 3 1/2 years during World War II in Europe and the Pacific. During the war, Block's father and uncle purchased a deli, where he worked after returning home from the war before establishing his own business, Block's Kosher Kitchen, on Chicago's South Side. Although initially successful, he expanded it too fast and was ultimately forced to close it. Block then moved west. He studied at Washington University in St. Louis, where he majored in engineering, before he moved to Los Angeles. He was at first employed as a counterman at a kosher deli there. In 1956, Block joined the Los Angeles County Sheriff's Department as a deputy sheriff, becoming the first deputy in the department to work his way through every rank to the top.

In 1962, Block arrested comedian Lenny Bruce for obscenity, namely using the term "schmuck" during a comedy routine. Block had been sent to one of Bruce's performances by his superiors because he spoke Yiddish and thus could follow Bruce's act, which was peppered with the language.

During his tenure he became the highest paid elected official in the United States.

In the Live Action Video for Kids/Real Wheels video, "There Goes A Police Car", Block appeared at the end of the video to tell the viewers the purposes of police officers and deputy sheriffs. He also encouraged the viewers to visit a police or sheriff's station and practice using the 911 system for emergencies.

He was held liable for indemnifications by the Los Angeles County Board of Supervisors in a civil rights class action 42 USC §1983 for punitive damages and the violation of constitutional rights.

He died during his campaign for re-election, which he was expected to win. He still obtained about one third of the vote, as Lee Baca's opponents wanted the County Supervisors to appoint his successor. Block's death broke the tradition of the incumbent Sheriff selecting his successor.

The Sherman Block Supervisory Leadership Institute (SBSLI) was created in 1988. This is a program designed to stimulate personal growth and leadership, and ethical decision-making in California law enforcement front-line supervisors. California Law Enforcement Officers who hold the rank of Sergeant are the individuals who get to attend this program.

His cousin was movie producer Berle Adams.

Police appointments
Preceded by Peter J. Pitchess	Los Angeles County Sheriff	Succeeded by Lee Baca
