= Monte Nido, California =

Unincorporated community in California, United States

- Unincorporated community
- Location within California Location within the United States
- Coordinates: 34°04′51″N 118°41′13″W
- Country: United States
- State: California
- County: Los Angeles
- Elevation: 607 ft (185 m)
- Time zone: UTC-8 (Pacific (PST))
  - Summer (DST): UTC-7 (PDT)
- Area code: 818
- GNIS feature ID: 256067

Monte Nido (Spanish for "Mount Nest") is an unincorporated community in western Los Angeles County, California, United States. Monte Nido is located in the Santa Monica Mountains, 3 miles (4.8 km) north of Malibu.

The L.A. County Fire Department fire station at Monte Nido hosts one of the LADWP's remote rainfall monitoring systems.

== History ==
Monte Nido started out as a mountain-getaway resort in the 1920s and 1930s. Named after the nearby iconic ridge of the Santa Monica Mountains, the century-old Saddle Peak Lodge restaurant has attracted a Hollywood in-crowd since Clark Gable and Errol Flynn frequented the rustic getaway when it was the Crater Camp Roadhouse. Among the famous who rented out holiday cabins here were Mary Pickford, Charlie Chaplin, and President Herbert Hoover.

There were about 150 families living in Monte Nido in 1972.
