= Compton Executioners =

Deputy Gang within the Los Angeles Sheriff's Department

- Founded by: Andy Toone
- Founding location: LASD Compton station
- Territory: Compton, California
- Criminal activities: Police corruption
- Allies: Lynwood Vikings

The Compton Executioners is a deputy gang within the Los Angeles County Sheriff's Department (LASD). In July 2021, U.S. Congressional Representative Maxine Waters called for a Department of Justice inquiry into the existence of the gang.

Members of the ‘Executioners’ are deputies operating out of the Compton station of the LASD. These deputies share a tattoo, which features a skeleton with an assault rifle and a military-style helmet. The gang was founded by former 2000 Boys member Andy Toone.

== Tattoo ==
Members of the Executioners identify themselves with a calf tattoo depicting a skeleton wearing a military-style helmet labeled "CPT" and holding a Kalashnikov rifle with '28' in Roman numerals on the magazine. The 'CPT' stands for "Compton" and the '28' represents Compton as the LASD's 28th substation.

== Membership ==
Members of the Executioners are drawn from deputies who work at the Compton station of the LASD. Knock LA has reported that the gang consists of around 80 members. Potential recruits are chosen based on past acts of violence against members of the Compton community and recruits cannot be Black or female.
