= Lee Baca =

American ex-sheriff and felon (born 1942)

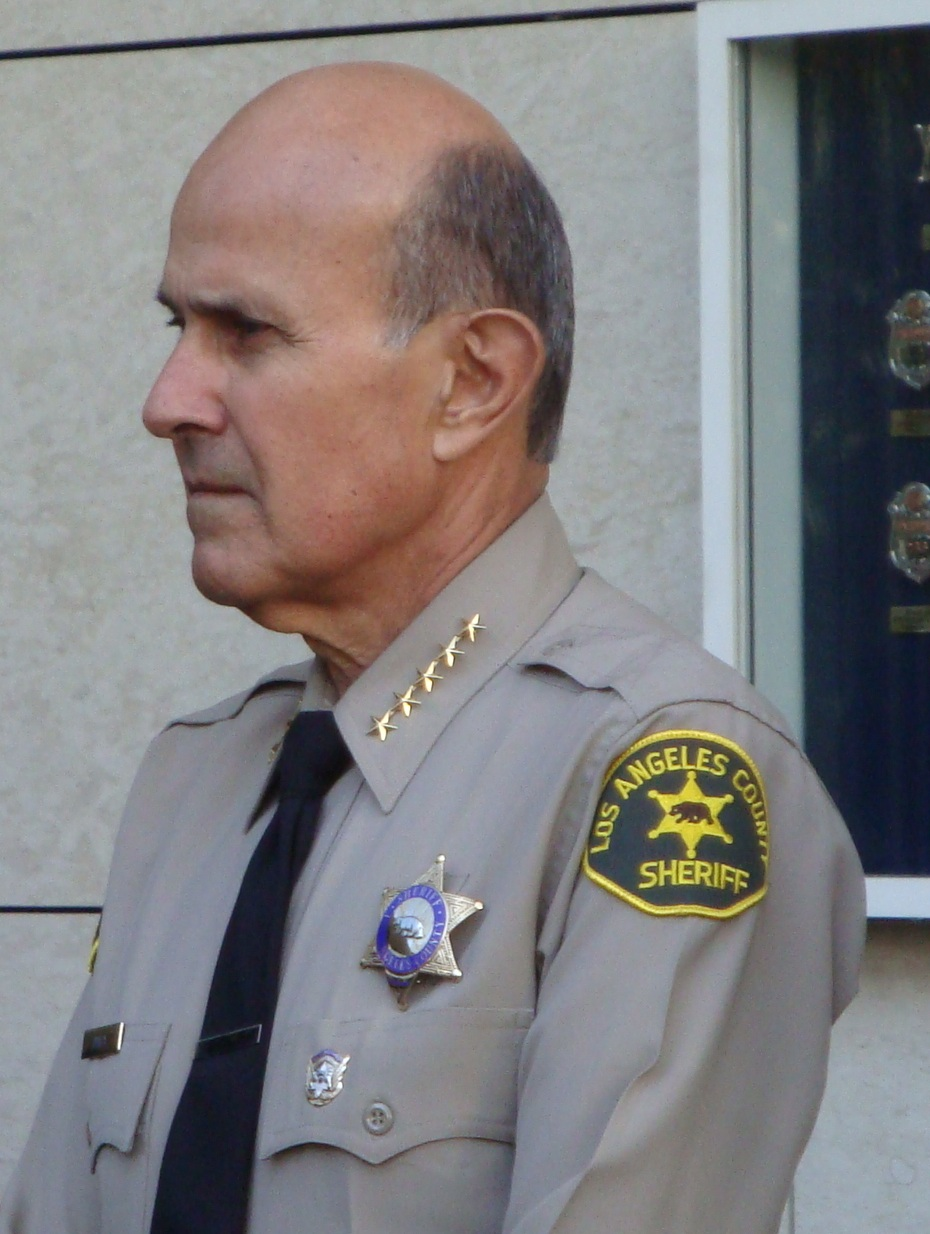
- Baca in 2011

30th Sheriff of Los Angeles County, California
- In office December 7, 1998 – January 2014
- Preceded by: Sherman Block
- Succeeded by: John Scott (interim)

Personal details
- Born: Leroy David Baca; May 27, 1942 (age 84) East Los Angeles, California, U.S.
- Party: Republican
- Spouses: Judith Howell (m. 1964, divorced) Carol Chiang (m. 1999)
- Criminal status: Released
- Conviction(s): Obstruction of justice, making false statements
- Penalty: 3 years (36 months) in federal prison
- Other name: Lee Baca
- Police career
- Country: United States
- Department: Los Angeles County Sheriff's Department
- Service years: 1965–2014
- Rank: Sworn in as a deputy — 1965; Sergeant — 1970; Lieutenant — 1975; Captain — 1981; Commander — 1987; Deputy Chief — 1992; Sheriff — 1998

Leroy David "Lee" Baca (born May 27, 1942) is a former American law enforcement officer and convicted felon who served as the 30th Sheriff of Los Angeles County, California from 1998 to 2014. In 2017, he was convicted of felony obstruction of justice and lying to the FBI.

Baca was elected Los Angeles County's 30th sheriff against his mentor Sherman Block, who had died in office days prior to the election but remained on the ballot. He was sworn in on December 7, 1998. He was re-elected to a fourth term in 2010. He was criticized for proposing a half-percent sales tax increase in 2004 to hire more deputy sheriffs, placing friends on the payroll, taking of gifts, and for releasing inmates from the Los Angeles County Jail. On May 12, 2017, Baca was sentenced to three years in federal prison for his role in a scheme to obstruct an FBI investigation of abuses in county jails. Baca reported to prison and began his sentence on February 5, 2020.

== Early life ==
On May 27, 1942, Baca was born in East Los Angeles, California. Baca's mother was a seamstress born in Michoacán and then brought to the U.S. when she was a year old. His parents divorced and Baca grew up with his grandparents Clara and Thomas Baca. Thomas Baca came from Albuquerque, New Mexico.

In 1960, Baca graduated from Benjamin Franklin High School, located in the Highland Park neighborhood of Los Angeles, California. In high school, Baca was the student senior class president.

== Education ==
Baca graduated from East Los Angeles College. In 1971, Baca received a bachelor's degree from California State University, Los Angeles. In 1974, Baca earned a Master of Public Administration degree from USC. In 1993, Baca received a Doctorate of Public Administration degree from USC School of Policy, Planning, and Development.

== Career ==
In 1964, Baca joined the United States Marine Corps Reserve.

On August 23, 1965, Baca was sworn in as a deputy sheriff trainee of the Los Angeles Sheriff's Department. Baca began his career in street patrol, custody, and recruitment, and was a staff instructor at the Sheriff's Academy. In 1981, Baca became captain of the Norwalk, California, sheriff station. On January 23, 1992, Sheriff Sherman Block promoted Baca to the rank of chief deputy. On December 7, 1998, Baca was sworn in as Los Angeles County Sheriff. On January 7, 2014, Baca resigned facing a tough re-election campaign, amid a prison-abuse scandal that eventually led to his conviction three years later.

== Policy positions ==
He opposed the California ban on shark finning and is a Republican who opposed California Proposition 8. Baca supported Secure Communities, a program by the Department of Homeland Security in which the federal government collaborates with local law enforcement to detain and deport undocumented immigrants.

=== Early release of county jail inmates ===
On November 9, 2006, Baca and Los Angeles District Attorney Steve Cooley issued a press release regarding their joint policy on early release, which requires all jail inmates to serve at least 25% of their sentence before becoming eligible for early release. In the press release, Baca said, "I also want to thank District Attorney Steve Cooley for his most valuable input on this matter. This new policy will move us forward to where one day all inmates will serve the entire time required."

Also in the press release, Cooley said, "I commend Sheriff Baca for implementing this new policy. This will assure that sentences imposed by the court will be carried out in a predictable and even-handed manner." The policy was also applauded by then Redondo Beach City Attorney Michael W. Webb, who said, "Defendants will no longer be able to routinely turn down offers that involve alternative sentences such as Cal Trans or other forms of community service."

== Notable incidents ==
=== Special reserves program ===
In 1999, Baca established a special reserves program. According to The Los Angeles Times, the program was designed to cater to celebrities, executives, star athletes, and other "notable persons". Some members of the Sheriff's Department said they were worried that the program would be abused, particularly by those seeking a backdoor way of securing a concealed weapons permit in Los Angeles County.

Within a month of Baca swearing in his first new celebrity reserve deputies, one of his recruits, Scott Zacky, had been suspended and relieved of duty for brandishing a firearm in a confrontation outside his Bel-Air home. The program would eventually be suspended. Less than six months later, another member of the special reserves program was indicted by a federal grand jury on charges of international money laundering. No well-known celebrities joined the program, and fewer than 20 little-known wealthy individuals actually participated. The program was suspended in November 2006.

=== Mel Gibson ===
On July 28, 2006, actor Mel Gibson was arrested for driving under the influence (DUI) while speeding in his vehicle with an open container of alcohol." According to the arrest report, Gibson exploded into an angry tirade when the arresting officer would not allow him to drive home. According to arresting officer notes subsequently obtained by the media website TMZ, Gibson said to the arresting officer "Fucking Jews... the Jews are responsible for all the wars in the world. Are you a Jew?" Gibson subsequently admitted in a televised interview with Diane Sawyer that the statements attributed to him were authentic.

The Los Angeles Sheriff Department initially told the press that Gibson was arrested without incident or special treatment. However, the department withheld video and audio recordings of the arrest, asserting they were exempt from California's open government laws, and the arresting officer, himself a Jew, later alleged that his superiors ordered him to excise the pages of his incident report that detailed his rant, and that his co-workers and superiors retaliated against him through ostracism and denial of promotion. Prior to his arrest, Gibson had filmed a PSA for Baca's relief committee dressed in a sheriff's uniform. Upon questioning by The Los Angeles Times about charges of celebrity favoritism, Baca denied that his department tried to cover up Gibson's behavior. At the time, The Times reported that a civilian oversight committee had decided to investigate whether Gibson had received favorable treatment because of his celebrity status or his longtime friendship with Baca.

=== Paris Hilton ===
On June 3, 2007, celebrity Paris Hilton surrendered herself to the Los Angeles Sheriff's Department to serve a 45-day sentence as ordered by Superior Court Judge Michael T. Sauer. The 45 day sentence could be reduced to as few as 23 days for good behavior. She was placed in the Lynwood facility and separated from the general population for her safety.

Around 2 a.m. on June 7, 2007, Baca's department released Hilton after serving only 79 hours of her sentence. She was allowed to return home, and her sentence was converted to 40 days of house arrest amid rumors of a medical condition, which later emerged to be psychological.

The decision to convert her sentence was made by Baca without the consultation of either the presiding judge or the prosecuting city attorney. Further complicating the matter is the initial ruling in which the judge specifically said Hilton would not be allowed to use house arrest in lieu of jail. However, Superior Court spokesman Allan Parachini did acknowledge this is normally the purview of the sheriff, saying, "Early release decisions are the province of the sheriff every day due to jail overcrowding, but not always".

The situation led the city attorney to file a petition suggesting that Baca should be held in contempt of court for his actions. Though the judge chose not to pursue any action against Baca, he did reverse the decision and returned Hilton to jail while reaffirming the original sentence length. The offer of Hilton's attorney, Richard Hutton, to brief the judge in private chambers on her condition was declined. No written evidence was produced during that court session.

Baca later described Hilton's medical condition as a deteriorating, life-threatening condition that left her speaking incoherently. Also, in testimony to L.A. County Supervisors, Baca stated that the department had called the judge prior to Hilton's release to seek the judge's assistance in obtaining from Hilton's doctors what medications she was taking, so that County Jail doctors could administer the proper medications without dangerous side-effects to calm Hilton who had medical readings of great concern by jail physicians.

Baca stated the judge tersely responded, "She's faking", and the judge abruptly hung up. This, according to Baca, left him little choice but to release Hilton with an ankle bracelet, considering she was a nonviolent offender and that her jail sentence for her infraction is unusual and excessive in L.A. County (usually "community service" sentence picking up trash along L.A. freeways) with his jails beyond capacity.

=== Lev Dermen ===
Baca is alleged to have taken a cash bribe from Lev Dermen, a suspected member of an Armenian organized crime group.

=== Relationship with Scientology ===
During Baca's time in office, he publicly endorsed and supported Narconon, a drug rehabilitation organization owned and operated by the Church of Scientology. On a number of occasions, Baca allowed his name and image to be used in advertising and promotional materials for the Los Angeles-based orgs of the Church of Scientology.

== Religious dialogue ==
In the days after the attacks of September 11, 2001, Baca, as head of the County of Los Angeles Sheriff's Department, led a series of interfaith meetings between Jews, Christians, Muslims, Sikhs and others whom he had handpicked to attend. The first meeting took place on September 12, 2001, in Monterey Park at the Sheriff's Department headquarters with 60 religious leaders. The next took place on September 20, in which California Governor Gray Davis, County Supervisor Zev Yaroslavsky and 70 others of a variety of religious beliefs participated. The next meeting was at the Museum of Tolerance on September 28, including local TV producers and directors on the stage with Muslim and Jewish leaders, in front of an audience of hand-picked-religious leaders. As a result of this meeting local television stations aired a 30-minute series of segments by 10 TV news departments. The series was called "Together" and it was used to explain the diverse cultures of Los Angeles and the need for tolerance among them. Later another meeting took place at the King Fahd Mosque in Culver City. On October 14 another meeting took place at the Islamic Center in Northridge, which hosted the Kol Tkvah synagogue of Rabbi Steven Jocobs. About 700 people, with hundreds of young children, attended. Baca created two Muslim outreach programs beginning in 2006 designed to create trust within the local Muslim community as well as hire law enforcement officers that other Muslims can identity with.

== Prisoner abuse scandal and federal conviction ==
The ACLU compiled an extensive report on prisoner abuse in the county jail system. The report documented unprecedented levels of abuse and concluded "The long-standing and pervasive culture of deputy hyper-violence in Los Angeles County jails — a culture apparently condoned at the highest levels — cries out for swift and thorough investigation and intervention by the federal government." The abuse included rape of inmates by deputy sheriffs. In early 2012, the ACLU filed suit to prevent Baca from continuing in his position. The report led to an FBI investigation, which included recruiting a jail inmate as an informant. The informant was identified by deputies, and subsequently concealed from the FBI. The investigation resulted in convictions and guilty pleas by a number of lower-ranking officers, including a retired sheriff's captain. Baca was widely considered responsible for the misbehavior.

External videos
- Former L.A. Sheriff's Cmdr. Interviewed About Baca's Failed Leadership Concerning Inmate Abuse Scandal, KTLA5, July 18, 2016

Though he was not charged in the abuse, he was charged with and pled guilty to participating in the cover-up. On February 10, 2016, Baca pled guilty to lying to Federal investigators: "lying twice about his involvement in hiding a jail inmate from FBI investigators". He also admitted knowing that his subordinates had threatened an FBI special agent. The plea was made in return for a sentence of six months.

Below is a summary of the Lee Baca case from the U.S. Attorney's office:

During the course of the investigation that was being conducted by the FBI, the U.S. Attorney's Office and a federal grand jury, a sheriff's deputy assigned to the Men's Central Jail accepted a bribe to smuggle a cellphone into the facility. The phone was delivered to an inmate who was working as an FBI informant. Jail officials later discovered the phone, linked it to the FBI and determined that the inmate was an informant. This led to a monthlong scheme to obstruct the investigation, which included members of the conspiracy concealing the informant from the FBI, the United States Marshals Service and the grand jury. Members of the conspiracy also engaged in witness tampering and harassing the FBI agent.

— U.S. Attorney's office

After Baca's February plea, California Attorney General Kamala Harris decided to reopen and investigate another inmate abuse case involving Mitrice Richardson. She was a young Black woman released in the middle of the night without any means of returning home safely, and was found dead months later not far from Malibu Sheriff station.

Baca's former undersheriff, Paul Tanaka, was also caught in the scandal. On April 6, 2016, Tanaka was convicted on conspiracy and obstruction of justice charges related to the same prison abuses.

On June 20, 2016, the U.S. Attorney's office released a court filing by Baca's attorney, claiming he had been diagnosed with Alzheimer's disease.

In July, the judge in the case rejected Baca's plea deal, deciding that a sentence of no more than six months was too lenient.

So on August 1, Baca withdrew his guilty plea. Baca was indicted again on August 5, on charges of conspiracy, obstruction of justice, and making false statements. However, the jury became "hopelessly deadlocked" with 11–1 in favor of acquittal, and on December 22, 2016, a mistrial was declared.

In a retrial, Baca was convicted on March 15, 2017. On May 12, 2017, he was sentenced to three years in federal prison. He was due to report to jail on July 25, 2017, to begin carrying out his three-year sentence, but a stay was granted the day prior pending an appeal. Baca lost his second bid for an appeal on August 23, 2017.

In February 2019, a panel of judges from the 9th Circuit Court of Appeals upheld Baca's conviction. In April, they denied his requests for another hearing. On January 13, 2020, the U.S. Supreme Court declined to hear his appeal. On February 5, Baca began serving a three-year prison sentence at Federal Correctional Institution, La Tuna, Texas. He was released from custody on January 14, 2022.

== Personal life ==
Baca and his ex-wife, Judith Howell, have two adult children. One son is David Baca, who was a sergeant with the Murrieta Police Department in Murrieta, California and retired in 2018. Baca is a longtime resident of San Marino, California, and both of his children attended San Marino High School.

In 1999, Baca married Carol Chiang. Carol Chiang came to the U.S. from Taiwan in 1979. Baca and his wife were active in various community organizations, including the Los Angeles Chinese American Museum. They were given the Historymakers Award in 2004 for visionary actions. Baca was honored by the Southern California Public Affairs Council of the Church of Jesus Christ of Latter-day Saints in 2013 for his inclusive service to the Los Angeles community. Baca's first wife and children are Latter-day Saints.

== See also ==
- Death of Mitrice Richardson, former inmate at Lost Hills Sheriff station
- Paul Tanaka, Baca's undersheriff, also convicted in relation to prison abuses
- Baca family of New Mexico

Police appointments
Preceded by Sherman Block	Los Angeles County Sheriff	Succeeded by John Scott; Interim
