= Men's Central Jail =

Jail in Los Angeles, California, United States

Men's Central Jail (MCJ)
- Interactive map of Men's Central Jail (MCJ)
- Location: Los Angeles, California; 34.0590°N 118.2321°W
- Status: Operational
- Security class: Minimum–Maximum
- Capacity: 5,276
- Population: 4,300
- Opened: 1963
- Managed by: Los Angeles County Sheriff's Department
- Website: website

Men's Central Jail is a Los Angeles County Sheriff's Department county jail for men in downtown Los Angeles, California, United States. Built in 1963, it is one of the oldest county jails in California. The Men's Central Jail is located at 441 Bauchet St., Los Angeles 90012. The Men's Central Jail houses men who are awaiting trial or who have been convicted of crimes.

The Men's Central Jail is considered one of the largest jails in the world. In May 2013, along with the adjacent Twin Towers Correctional Facility, Men's Central Jail was ranked as one of the ten worst prisons in the United States, based on reporting in Mother Jones magazine.

On July 7, 2020, the Los Angeles County Board of Supervisors voted 4–0 to pursue a plan to close the Men's Central Jail within 12 months. In voting to eventually close the 57-year-old facility, county supervisors said they wanted to focus on community-based programs to treat mental health challenges of those entering and exiting the jail system administered by the Los Angeles County Sheriff's Department. The vote came amid deliberate inmate reductions during outbreaks of COVID-19 and the Black Lives Matter movement protests over police violence and the murder of George Floyd.

== Construction and population ==
The construction of the Men's Central Jail was finished in 1963. The original building was designed to house 3,323 inmates. In 1976, an addition was added to the structure at the cost of $35 million, and by December 1990, inmate capacity was 5,276.

Men's Central Jail has severe overcrowding, leading to problems such as inmates lacking shower facilities, very short recreation times out of their cells, wearing dirty clothes for up to a week, and inmates sleeping on floors for extended periods of time. In March 1997, the inmate population was about 13,000, and saw similarly high numbers by June 2015, where the inmate population was about 17,000 and increased to 19,000 by August, where the legal limits on the jail population were only for 15,000 inmates.

=== Notable inmates ===
- Conrad Murray, Michael Jackson's doctor
- Chris Brown, recording artist
- Nick Reiner, son of actor Rob Reiner
- Danny Masterson, former actor
- D4vd, singer-songwriter
- Drakeo the Ruler, rapper
- Edward Furlong, actor
- Erik Menendez
- Geraldine Elizabeth Carmichael, automotive excutive
- Harvey Weinstein, former film producer
- Kelsey Grammer, actor
- O. J. Simpson
- Richard Goldberg, sex offender
- Richard Pryor, comedian
- Richard Ramirez
- Ron Jeremy, pornographic actor
- Scott Weiland, Stone Temple Pilots' songwriter and lead singer
- Sean Penn, actor
- Shorty Rossi, reality TV personality
- Suge Knight, record executive
- Todd Bridges, actor, Diff'rent Strokes
- Tommy Lee, Mötley Crüe's drummer
- YG, rapper

== Services ==
Men's Central Jail provides some services to its inmates. Inmates can attend self-help classes on domestic violence, alcohol abuse, and substance abuse. Religious services are provided to inmates in the wake of several ACLU lawsuits. As of 2004, selected inmates can earn a GED while incarcerated.

The jail is also one of the few in the US that has a dedicated LGBT unit known as the K6G unit.

== Violence and lawsuits ==
The ACLU has sued Men's Central Jail for major civil rights violations. The United States Department of Justice has also sued the Men's Central Jail.

In 2013, federal prosecutors charged 18 Sheriff's Deputies with excessive use of force. In June 2015, Los Angeles Sheriff's Deputies were found guilty of beating a handcuffed man at the Men's Central Jail.

== See also ==
- Rikers Island (New York City)
- Cook County Jail (Chicago)
- Harris County, Texas jails (Houston)
