= Los Angeles County Sheriff's Department =

Law enforcement agency in California, United States

County of Los Angeles Sheriff's Department
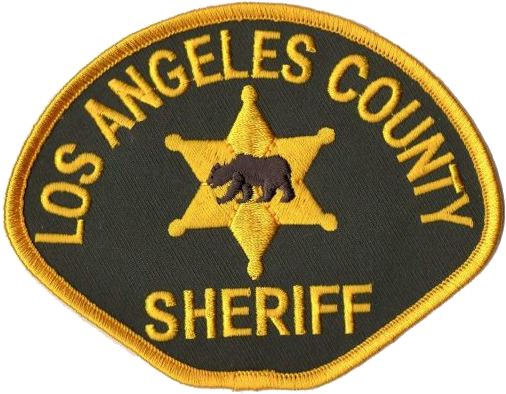
- Patch

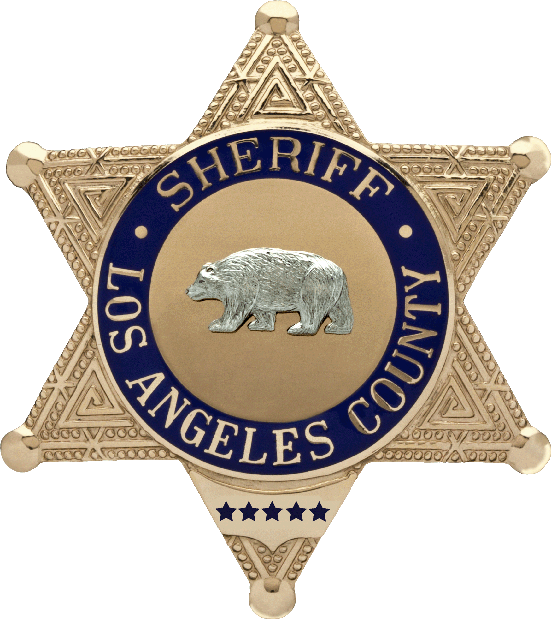
- Badge

- Flag
- Common name: Los Angeles County Sheriff's Department
- Abbreviation: LASD
- Motto: "A Tradition of Service"

Agency overview
- Formed: 1850; 176 years ago
- Employees: 20,159 (2015)
- Annual budget: US$3,303,110,000 (2019)

Jurisdictional structure
- Operations jurisdiction: Los Angeles County, California, United States
- Los Angeles County Sheriff's Department's jurisdiction
- Area: 4,083 square miles (10,575 km^{2})
- Population: 10,116,705
- Legal jurisdiction: As per operations jurisdiction
- General nature: Civilian police

Operational structure
- Headquarters: The Hall of Justice; 211 West Temple Street; Los Angeles, California
- Deputies: 10,915 sworn deputies (2015)
- Unsworn members: 9,244 unsworn members (2015)
- Agency executives: Robert Luna, Sheriff; April Tardy, Undersheriff; Myron Johnson, Assistant Sheriff; Paula Tokar, Assistant Sheriff; Holly Francisco, Assistant Sheriff; Jill Torres, Assistant Sheriff
- Operations Divisions: 4: Administrative Services; Countywide Operations; Custody Operations; Patrol Operations

Facilities
- Areas: 23: Altadena; Avalon; Carson; Century; Cerritos; Compton; Crescenta Valley; East Los Angeles; Industry; Bellflower/Lakewood; Lancaster; Lomita; Malibu/Lost Hills; Marina Del Rey; Norwalk; Palmdale; Pico Rivera; San Dimas; Santa Clarita Valley; South Los Angeles; Temple; Walnut/Diamond Bar; West Hollywood

Website
- lasd.org

The County of Los Angeles Sheriff's Department (LASD), also known as the Los Angeles County Sheriff's Department, is a law enforcement agency serving Los Angeles County, California. The LASD is the largest sheriff's department in the United States and the third largest local police agency in the United States, following the New York Police Department, and the Chicago Police Department. The LASD has approximately 19,000 employees—9,915 sworn deputies and 9,244 unsworn members. It is sometimes confused with the similarly-named but separate Los Angeles Police Department, which provides law enforcement services within the city of Los Angeles, which is the county seat of Los Angeles County, although both departments have their headquarters in downtown Los Angeles.

The department's three main responsibilities are to provide municipal police services within Los Angeles County, courthouse security for the Superior Court of Los Angeles County, and housing and transportation services of inmates within the county jail system. In addition to providing municipal police services to the unincorporated communities within Los Angeles County, it has contractual arrangements to provide police services for 42 of the 88 independent cities within Los Angeles County. The LASD also has contracts to provide police services for the Los Angeles Metropolitan Transportation Authority and Metrolink.

In 2021, it was confirmed that numerous separate gangs of deputy sheriffs within the LASD had been known to be operating since the 1970s. These gangs engaged "in a pattern of on-duty behavior that intentionally violated the law or fundamental principles of professional policing," including racial profiling, police brutality, police corruption, and other misconduct.

== History ==
The Los Angeles County Sheriff's Department, which was founded in 1850, was the first professional police force in the Los Angeles area. The all-volunteer, Los Angeles-specific Los Angeles Rangers were formed in 1853 to assist the LASD. They were soon succeeded by the Los Angeles City Guards, another volunteer group.

On December 15, 2009, the Los Angeles County Board of Supervisors voted 4–1 to merge the Los Angeles County Police into the Los Angeles County Sheriff's Department. The merger took place on June 30, 2010.

During the COVID-19 pandemic, the LASD refused to enforce mask mandates. LASD Sheriff Alex Villanueva also refused to enforce a vaccine requirement for LASD staff, stating that large parts of the LASD would refuse to comply with it and he would "...lose 5, 10% of [the LASD] workforce overnight on a vaccine mandate." In November 2021, Villanueva said only 42% of LASD staff were vaccinated against COVID-19.

== County jail system ==
The Los Angeles County Jail provides short-term incarceration services for the entire county, including Los Angeles, Glendale, Burbank, and Long Beach, all of which have their own police departments. The Men's Central Jail (MCJ) and Twin Towers Correctional Facility (TTCF) are located in a dense cluster next the rail yard northeast of Union Station. The North County Correctional Facility (NCCF) is the largest of the four jail facilities located at the Pitchess Detention Center in Castaic, California. The Los Angeles County Women's Jail, known as the Century Regional Detention Facility or the Lynwood Jail, is located in Lynwood, California.

=== Concerns and challenges ===
The Los Angeles County Jail incarcerates about 200,000 individuals each year, and with such large numbers, the jail has faced numerous problems with its facilities.

In 1988, a scandal erupted after a Los Angeles jailhouse informant demonstrated that he was able to engineer false confessions to murder from inmates he had never met before. In California, jailhouse informants have most frequently been used in murder cases.

In May 2013, the Men's Central Jail and the Twin Towers Correctional Facility (taken together) ranked as one of the ten worst jails in the United States, based on reporting in Mother Jones magazine.

One of the issues the jails faced was with visitation, exemplified by an event in the Men's Central Jail. Twenty-three-year-old male Gabriel Carillo was severely beaten and pepper sprayed by a deputy in Men's Central Jail on Saturday, February 26, 2012. Carillo was there with his girlfriend, Grace Torres, to visit his younger brother. Both Torres and Carillo illegally brought their cell phones into the jail and were caught in possession of the phones. Torres hid her cell phone in her boot and snuck it into the visitor's lobby despite signs prohibiting doing so, while Carillo claimed he forgot to remove his cell phone from his pocket. The deputies confiscated both phones shortly after, handcuffed Carillo, and took both Carillo and Torres into the break room. Carillo got into a verbal altercation with officers and claimed he was then assaulted by them.

Following the incidents, Los Angeles County Sheriff Lee Baca announced that the Men's Central Jail could be closed. Construction of a new jail has been proposed to replace the Men's Central Jail.

Another challenge that the Los Angeles County Jail faces is violence within the jail community.

Related to this issue is Los Angeles County Jail's K6G unit, which is intended to be a separate unit for gay-identified men and transgender women. Although it has been shown that this unit is successful through its lower rates of sexual violence, the creation and systematics of this unit have sparked controversy. In order to be admitted into the K6G unit, inmates must prove that they are gay. However, those who identify inmates as homosexual individuals eligible for the K6G unit rely on stereotypes constructed by society about gay men. This procedure prevents homosexual men who are not open about their sexuality, particularly those of color, from coming out as gay for fear of abuse if they do so.

Serious health concerns have begun to arise with the issue of mass incarceration in the Los Angeles County Jails. Several organizations and scholars have analyzed random samples of prisoners with illnesses and the healthcare that they receive while incarcerated. The American Public Health Association claims that some of these prisoners suffer from a variety of other disorders. They also state that more than 30% of their sample group had a severe mental disorder or a substance use disorder. The detainees that were diagnosed with severe mental disorders or substance use were often in jail because they had committed nonviolent crimes. An issue that arises with the incarceration of individuals with mental disorders is that they must be tested for competency before they can be put on trial, which can leave inmates in jail for longer than necessary.

Richard Lamb and Robert W. Grant conducted a similar study of 101 women that are imprisoned in the Los Angeles County Jail system. In this study, they concluded that 70% of them had traumatizing experiences of physical violence, 40% of these women were involved in prostitution, and 84% of the women with children were incapable of taking care of them. In addition, there were more mentally ill men in jail than there were women. In a study of male inmates, there appeared to have been issues of the "criminalization" of those whom were mentally ill.

An issue that resides in these studies is that there is uncertainty when trying to determine if these prisoners receive any beneficial treatment. In response to this issue, Dr. Terry Kupers mentions that when considering the large proportion of prisoners with significant mental illness, few of these Los Angeles County Jail inmates receive adequate mental health treatment. However, mental illnesses have been and are currently being studied in the Los Angeles County Jail. For instance, several researchers studied Bipolar I disorder and found that a way to decrease the number of inmates with the disorder is by having them participate in longer psychiatric hospital stays.

One solution to this issue could be opt-out screening and vaccinations for STIs and other infectious diseases, which has the potential to improve health conditions in jail and in surrounding communities. This can be accomplished by providing health care that many inmates, especially impoverished blacks and Latinos, would not receive otherwise. In addition, the implementation of this action would decrease the spreading of diseases from the jail to home communities. Using opt-out screenings and vaccinations can be used as a mechanism to reach out to inner city community health issues as well as provide a new area for research in the effectiveness in vaccinations and screenings.

The Los Angeles County Jail system incarcerates a large number of minority inmates. Victor Rios argues that a new era of mass incarceration has resulted in the development of a youth control complex. This complex resulted from a network of racialized criminalization, and the punishment arrived from institutions of authority that patrolled and incapacitated black and Latino youth. Rios concludes that it is not policing but the harsh policing of inner cities that marks young people from their early years, effectively stigmatizing them through negative credentials before they have an opportunity to acquire the more positive forms demanded for participation in mainstream society.

In 2021, a Los Angeles Times analysis found that in 44,000 bike stops for drugs and weapons (since 2017) that 85% were searched without reason and that the overwhelming majority of stops were non-white individuals.

== Deputy gangs ==
There are at least 18 active deputy gangs within the Los Angeles Sheriff's Department. The 1992 Kolts Commission report said they were found "particularly at stations in areas heavily populated by minorities—the so-called 'ghetto stations'—and deputies at those stations recruit persons similar in attitude to themselves."

During his tenure as Sheriff, Alex Villanueva, who according to Los Angeles County Court documents, was a member of the "Banditos" deputy gang himself, announced a "zero tolerance" policy to curb what he referred to as "deputy cliques." Villanueva has never acknowledged membership in the Banditos deputy gang, but did admit to being a member of the "Cavemen" while stationed in East Los Angeles. A 2020 county inspector general report concluded that the Banditos gang at the East LASD station were "gang-like and [that] their influence has resulted in favoritism, sexism, racism and violence."

The first deputy gang acknowledged by the LASD was the "Little Devils" in an internal memo in 1973, although they are believed to have been involved in the death of Los Angeles Times reporter and law enforcement critic Ruben Salazar during the National Chicano Moratorium March against the Vietnam War on August 29, 1970. They operated out of the East Los Angeles station and sported tattooed caricatures of a small, red devil on their left calves. They were known at the time to have at least 47 members.

The "Wayside Whities" operated out of the Peter J. Pitchess Detention Center throughout the 1980s, their alleged mission being to "bring to heel" any incarcerated black men, especially those who fought with white prisoners.

Following years of police violence in the city of Lynwood, over two dozen civil rights attorneys compiled claims and filed a class action lawsuit in 1990, in which they asked the federal court to take over the Lynwood Station, home of a deputy gang known as the Lynwood Vikings. A federal judge described the Lynwood Vikings as a neo-Nazi and white supremacist gang.

Los Angeles blog outlet Knock LA has published a database of hundreds of LASD employees found in court documents to be associated with deputy gang activity, including names of officers, gang affiliation, case number, deputy/badge/serial number, and department title. The database includes Former Undersheriff Paul Tanaka, who also served as the mayor of Gardena, California, is identified as a member of the Lynwood Vikings, and was convicted of federal obstruction charges in 2014.

In July 2021, U.S. Representative Maxine Waters called for a United States Department of Justice investigation into allegations that a violent deputy gang known as the Executioners was running the Compton station of the LASD.

== Misconduct ==
In October 1969, LASD deputies bungled a drug raid in Whittier along with officers from the California State Bureau of Narcotics and one officer from nearby Vernon. The team went to the wrong address. In the confusion, the Vernon officer, Detective Sergeant Frank Sweeny, fired his rifle. The bullet went through the floor of the apartment and killed Heyden Dyer who lived downstairs.

On February 11, 1989, deputy sheriffs in riot gear invaded the family home of GLOW professional wrestler Emily Dole, also known professionally as Mt. Fiji, in Cerritos, California during a bridal shower for Dole's sister, Melinda. Much like the Rodney King incident two years later, the event was videotaped by a neighbor, Doug Botts, showing the sheriffs beating the family. Despite her imposing physique, Dole remained in a passive stance with her arms folded in the middle of the street, where the video showed her being beaten to the ground with police batons and flashlights. All 34 members of the party, all Samoan, were beaten and arrested. The Samoan-American community was angered, contending the incident was racist in nature. The family sued the Sheriff's Department and won a $23 million settlement.

In 2006, an investigation into corruption at the department collapsed due to "the intimidation tactics of the LASD". A summary of the allegations claimed that captains in the department were ordered to collect $10,000 from each towing contractor doing business with the department. The payments were used as contributions to political causes favored by the sheriff.

In December 2009, the L.A. Times reported that L.A. County Auditor-Controller Wendy L. Watanabe's office found 348 deputies worked more than 900 hours of overtime between March 2007 and February 2008. This would equal an extra six months of full-time work. The audit found that over the last five years, the department had exceeded its overtime budget by an average of 104 percent for each year.

In September 2009, Mitrice Richardson was observed in a Malibu, California, restaurant experiencing an apparent mental health crisis. She made statements regarding being from Mars and avenging the death of Michael Jackson, and was unable to pay her restaurant bill. Out of concern for her mental health, restaurant staff called sheriff's deputies, who arrested her. She was subsequently released by deputies at 12:38 a.m., with no means of accessing her car, phone, money, or any means of caring for herself. Her naked skeletal remains were discovered approximately 11 months after her disappearance. The county settled with the family for $900,000.

According to the Los Angeles Times, in 2010, the department hired almost 300 new officers. The department later discovered about 100 of the new hires had lied on their applications. Fifteen of the new deputies cheated on the department's polygraph test. About 200 of the new deputies and guards had been disqualified by other law enforcement agencies for misconduct or having failed qualification tests. The department launched an investigation of how the media found out about the flawed hiring process.

In September 2010, three deputies (Humberto Magallanes, Kenny Ramirez and Lee Simoes) pleaded no contest to charges related to their beating of a prisoner in 2006. The three men were sentenced to various periods of parole and resigned from the department.

In December 2010, members of a widely known gang-like group of L.A. County Sheriff's Deputies known as 'The 3,000 Boys' were involved in a violent fight in the parking lot of the Quiet Cannon Restaurant in Montebello. An anonymous call made to the Montebello police department reported three Sheriff's Deputies were holding down a fourth, beating him severely. Montebello Police arrived on the scene and broke up the fight; however, no arrests were made. The '3,000 Boys' is a name referring to a gang of L.A. County Sheriff's Deputies and Jailers who have been involved in the beatings and organized fights of inmates in the 3,000 block of the Men's Central Jail in Downtown Los Angeles. In May 2011, six deputies were suspended without pay (pending termination and criminal prosecution) for the beating of Evans Tutt, an inmate who had been filing complaints about living conditions within the jail.

In January 2011, Deputy Patricia Margaret Bojorquez was sentenced to a year in custody for making a false police report against her husband and recklessly firing a gun in her home.

In April 2011, Deputy Sean Paul Delacerda was convicted of breaking into a woman's home kidnapping, assaulting her with a handgun and falsely imprisoning her.

In July 2011, the department agreed to pay a half million dollars to the family of 16-year-old Avery Cody Jr. Cody was shot by Deputy Sergio Reyes in 2009. Reyes made several statements under oath that were disproven by video of the incident. The department then agreed to settle, but admitted no guilt.

In October 2011, Deputy Mark Fitzpatrick was convicted of an on-duty sexual assault and false imprisonment during a May 2008 traffic stop. Fitzpatrick has a long history of similar complaints against him during his career with the LASD. The department agreed to pay the woman $245,000.

In January, 2012 Jazmyne Ha Eng was shot and killed by Deputy Brian Vance outside a mental-health center in Rosemead, where she was a patient. Vance said Eng charged him and the other three deputies on the scene with a hammer, making them fear for their lives. Eng was 40 years old, weighed 93 pounds and stood five feet one inches tall. An internal investigation ruled the killing justifiable, but in February 2014, the county agreed to pay $1.8 million to settle the matter.

In May 2012, part of the Gang Enforcement Team was accused of being a clique called "Jump Out Boys" after a pamphlet was discovered indicating that members would receive a tattoo after being involved in a shooting, glorifying the incident. It drew comparisons to the problematic Rampart Division of the LAPD in the 1990s, who had the same tattoo.

In June 2012, Deputy Rafael Zelaya was sentenced to six months in jail for stealing drugs from someone while on duty.

In July 2013 Eugene Mallory was fatally shot in his house while the police alleged that he ran a meth lab, no such drugs were found in his house.

In July 2013, a federal jury awarded $200,000 to a 69-year-old man who had his rib broken by two sheriff's deputies attempting to arrest him in 2009. The jury also ordered Deputy Mark Collins to pay punitive damages of $1,000.

In October 2013, Deputy Mark Eric Hibner, was convicted by a jury of two counts of domestic violence and three counts of making threats.

In December 2013, Deputy Michael Anthony Grundynt was sentenced to three years probation for a fleeing the scene of an accident in 2011. He had been driving while drunk.

In March 2014, Deputy Jose Rigoberto Sanchez pleaded no contest to one count each of rape under color of authority and soliciting a bribe. He was sentenced to eight years and eight months in prison. His rapes happened in 2010 while he was on duty.

In July 2014, six correctional officers (two deputies, two sergeants and two lieutenants) were convicted by a federal court of interfering with a federal grand jury investigation of the county jail. In 2011, the officers obstructed an FBI undercover operation which was using an inmate informant to report on brutality and misconduct by jail deputies. Overall, a total of 21 LASD officers were convicted or pleaded guilty to federal civil rights violations, obstruction of justice, conspiracy to obstruct justice, falsifying reports, bribery, and firearm violations.

== Personnel, programs and equipment ==
The Los Angeles County Sheriff's Department is the largest sheriff's department and the third largest local policing agency in the United States. There are approximately 17,926 employees; over 9,972 sworn deputies and 7,954 non sworn members (professional staff).

By sex:

- Male: 86%
- Female: 14%

By race/ethnicity:

- Hispanic: 45%
- White: 39%
- African American/Black: 9%
- Asian: 5%

As of the 2nd quarter of 2018, the Los Angeles County Human Resources Department reported a total of 15,521 employees: 4,586 White, 1,921 Black, 7,130 Hispanic, 45 American Indian/Alaska Native, 1,320 Asian, 537 Filipino, 5 Native Hawaiian/other Pacific Islander, and 40 are two or more races.

There are an additional 4,200 civilian volunteers, 791 reserve deputies and 400 explorers. On December 3, 2022, Robert Luna took the oath of office and was sworn in as the 33rd Los Angeles County Sheriff.

=== Notable deputies ===
- Lillian Copeland (1904–1964), Olympic discus champion; set world records in discus, javelin, and shot put
- Alex Villanueva – Los Angeles County Sheriff from 2018 to 2022
- {Stephen Beeler}] (1965-1986) Author: The Firestone Syndrome; a best-selling novel published by Advocate House 2002.

=== Programs ===
LASD deputies provided law enforcement services to over three million residents in an area of 3,171 square miles (8,210 km^{2}) of the 4,083 square miles on the county, both in the unincorporated county land and within the 42 contract cities.

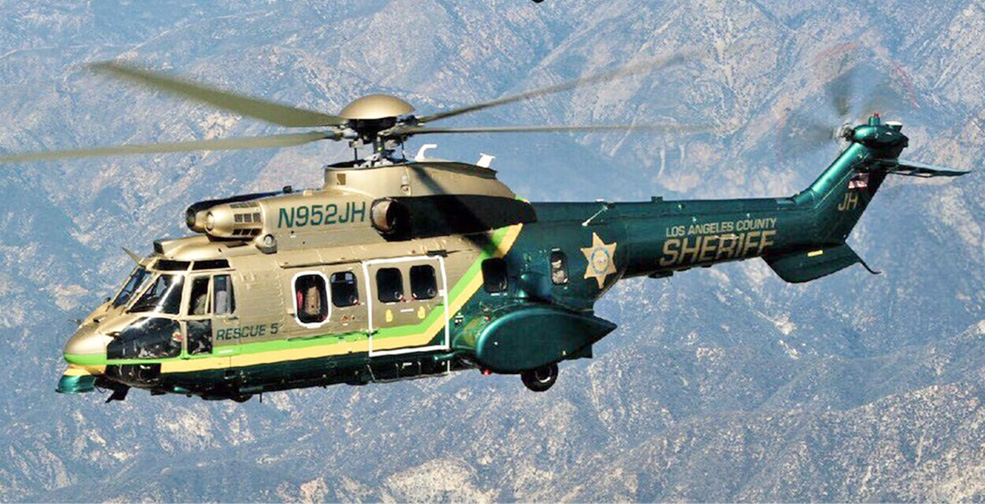
The AS332 Super Puma flying a SAR mission.

==== Aviation ====
The LASD runs an Air Rescue program. In 2012, LASD's Air Rescue 5 began replacing Sikorsky H-3 Sea Kings with 3 Eurocopter AS332 Super Pumas as primary rescue helicopters. In addition to having a fleet of three Sikorsky Sea Kings, the LASD also utilizes 14 Eurocopter AS-350 AStar helicopters and 3 Hughes/Schweizer 300 series S-300C helicopters.

The Sky Knight Helicopter Program is an airborne law enforcement program in Lakewood, California which began in 1966. The unit operates using non-sworn pilots, employed by the city of Lakewood, partnered with a sworn deputy sheriff from the Los Angeles County Sheriff's Department, Lakewood station. The unit currently operates three Schweizer 300C helicopters, based at Long Beach airport and flies about 1,800 hours per year. Today, the Sky Knight program is completely integrated within the sheriff's tactical operations. Five other cities (Artesia, Bellflower, Hawaiian Gardens, Paramount and Cerritos) contract with Lakewood to participate in the Sky Knight program. These five cities also contract with the Los Angeles County Sheriff's Department for police services.

==== Reserve program ====
The Los Angeles County Sheriff's Department supplements its full-time ranks with over 800 reserve deputies. Reserve sheriff's deputies are issued a badge, an identification card, uniforms, a Smith & Wesson M&P duty weapon, handcuffs, baton, and other equipment. Reserve deputy sheriffs must volunteer 20 hours per month of their time, with the regular compensation being one dollar per year. Reserve deputy sheriffs may also qualify for shooting bonus pay of up to $32.00 per month, and some paid special event assignments are occasionally available, as well as overtime. Like full-time deputies, reserve deputy sheriffs serve at the will of the Sheriff, must obey all departmental regulations, but do not fall into the framework of the civil service system. Reserve deputies supplement the regular operations of the Sheriff's Department by working in their choice of Uniform Reserve (Patrol), Mounted Posse, Search and Rescue or as a Specialist.

=== Equipment ===
==== Current ====
In 2013, the department transitioned to the Smith & Wesson M&P in 9mm. Shortly after the M&P's adoption, LASD deputies experienced a rash of accidental discharges in the field, later attributed by the Inspector General's office to insufficient weapon transition training for sworn personnel. In the past few years the LASD has also been issuing the M&P9 2.0 handgun as well, which is an upgraded version of the M&P9.

==== Historical ====
Prior to 1991, the standard sidearm of the LASD was the Smith & Wesson Model 15 Combat Masterpiece revolver in caliber .38 Special, with blue steel finish, four inch barrel, and adjustable sights. Deputies were permitted to purchase, at their own expense, a stainless steel version of the same weapon, the Smith & Wesson Model 67 .38 Caliber revolver. Ammunition evolved during the tenure of the .38 Caliber revolver. For most of the time period 1939–1976, the standard ammunition was a 158 grain lead round nose bullet propelled at 750 feet per second. In 1978, Remington High Velocity +P 125 grain ammunition was used. In 1985, Federal Law Enforcement Only +P+ ultra high velocity 110 grain ammunition was issued.

From 1947 on, patrol cars were issued with the Ithaca 37 Pump Action "Deerslayer" shotgun with 20 inch barrel, loaded with four rounds of "00" (double ought) buckshot. By 1973, the department had switched to a custom ordered short barreled shotgun with a 15-inch barrel, recoil pad, and glow in the dark sights. This custom shotgun was also used by certain police agencies that trained their deputies at the Sheriff's Academy, particularly Palos Verdes Police, Torrance Police and West Covina Police. In 1981, the department switched to a smaller buckshot size, #4 buckshot, to decrease the danger to bystanders.

Until the department switched to semiautomatic sidearms, Sheriff's Deputies were permitted to purchase any Colt or Smith & Wesson revolver with a 4-, 5-, or 6-inch barrel, provided only department-issued ammunition was used in the weapon. Officers were permitted to carry off duty any Colt or Smith & Wesson revolver chambered for .38 Special, typically with a 2-inch barrel. For a short period of time, the Smith & Wesson Model 59 9mm pistol was permitted to be carried off duty, or on duty as a backup weapon. Approved ammunition was Remington 115-grain jacketed hollow point.

Before 2013, the standard issue sidearm of the Los Angeles County Sheriff's Department was the Beretta 92FS in 9mm.

In the late 1990s, the LASD implemented a county-wide sound recorder/meter system, ShotStopper, to detect loud noises. The Special Enforcement Bureau (SEB) is the LASD's equivalent of a SWAT team, which was originally a creation of the nearby Los Angeles Police Department during the 1960s.

== Contract law enforcement ==
=== Cities ===
The LASD has entered into contracts with the numerous cities to serve as their police department/law enforcement agency. Forty-two of the eighty-eight cities in Los Angeles County contract with the Sheriff's Department for their complete municipal law enforcement services.

Some of the newer contract cities like Santa Clarita and West Hollywood have never had police departments. When their city governments were founded, they took over what was formerly unincorporated land, and then contracted their police responsibilities to the county sheriff. Since the department had substations in those areas, the result was to maintain the status quo.

In contrast, Compton, California, once had a police department. In 2000, the city council voted to dismantle the troubled police department and contract for police services. Compton has been at times notorious for gang violence, especially during its recent history.

City	Served by
City of Agoura Hills	Malibu/Lost Hills Station, Agoura Hills, CA (#22)
City of Artesia	Lakewood Station, Lakewood, CA (#13)
City of Avalon (Santa Catalina Island)	Avalon Station, Avalon, CA (#18)
City of Bellflower	Lakewood / Bellflower Substation, Bellflower, CA (#13)
City of Bradbury	Temple Station, Temple City, CA (#5)
City of Calabasas	Malibu/Lost Hills Station, Agoura Hills, CA (#22)
City of Carson	Carson Station, Carson, CA (#16)
City of Cerritos	Cerritos Station, Cerritos, CA (#23)
City of Commerce	East Los Angeles Station, Los Angeles CA (#2)
City of Compton	Compton Station, Compton, CA (#28)
City of Cudahy	East Los Angeles Station (#2)
City of Diamond Bar	Walnut/Diamond Bar Station, Walnut, CA (#29)
City of Duarte	Temple / Duarte Satellite Station, Duarte, CA (#5)
City of Hawaiian Gardens	Lakewood Station, Lakewood, CA (#13)
City of Hidden Hills	Malibu/Lost Hills Station (#22)
City of Industry	Industry Station, City of Industry, CA (#14)
City of La Canada Flintridge	Crescenta Valley Station, La Crescenta, CA (#12)
City of La Habra Heights	Industry Station, City of Industry, CA (#14)
City of Lakewood	Lakewood / Bellflower Substation, Bellflower, CA (#13)
City of La Mirada	Norwalk / La Mirada Substation, La Mirada, CA (#4)
City of Lancaster	Lancaster Station, Lancaster, CA (#11)
City of La Puente	Industry Station, City of Industry, CA (#14)
City of Lawndale	South Los Angeles Station (ex-Lennox Station) / Lawndale Service Center (#3)
City of Lomita	Lomita Station, Lomita, CA (#17)
City of Lynwood	Century Station, Lynwood, CA (#21)
City of Malibu	Malibu/Lost Hills Station, Agoura Hills, CA (#22)
City of Maywood	East Los Angeles Station (#2)
City of Norwalk	Norwalk Station, Norwalk, CA (#4)
City of Palmdale	Palmdale Station, Palmdale, CA (#26)
City of Paramount	Lakewood / Paramount Substation, Paramount, CA (#13)
City of Pico Rivera	Pico Rivera Station, Pico Rivera, CA (#15)
City of Rancho Palos Verdes	Lomita Station, Lomita, CA (#17)
City of Rolling Hills	Lomita Station, Lomita, CA (#17)
City of Rolling Hills Estates	Lomita Station, Lomita, CA (#17)
City of Rosemead	Temple Station, Temple City, CA (#5)
City of San Dimas	San Dimas Station, San Dimas, CA (#8)
City of Santa Clarita	Santa Clarita Valley Station, Santa Clarita, CA (#6)
City of South El Monte	Temple Station, Temple City, CA (#5)
City of Temple City	Temple Station Temple City, CA (#5)
City of Walnut	Walnut/Diamond Bar Station, Walnut, CA (#29)
City of West Hollywood	West Hollywood Station, West Hollywood, CA (#9)
City of Westlake Village	Malibu/Lost Hills Station, Agoura Hills, CA (#22)

=== Other agencies ===
LASD provides dispatch services by contract to California Department of Corrections and Rehabilitation for state parole agents. The services are provided by LASD County Services Bureau dispatchers.

Sheriff's dispatchers at the Avalon Sheriff's Station on Santa Catalina Island also provide dispatch services for the city of Avalon Fire Department.

By liaison via the Sheriff's Scientific Services Bureau, cybercrime detection and investigation often operates in conjunction with other agencies.

==== Transit contracts ====
- Metrolink
- Los Angeles MTA (L.A. Metro)
- Antelope Valley Transit Authority
- Foothill Transit

==== Community Colleges Services Bureau (#87) ====
- Los Angeles Community College District
- Antelope Valley Community College District

==== Court Services Division ====
- Prisoner Transport Services with 31 of the 58 counties in California
- Los Angeles County Marshal/Municipal Courts (Merged into LASD Court Services January 1. 1994)

==== Contract Custody Services ====
- California Department of Corrections and Rehabilitation (Housing Parole Violators)

== Rank structure ==
The following is the rank structure used by LASD.

Title	Insignia	Information
Sheriff		The sheriff is the General Manager of the LASD. The Sheriff is elected every four years.
Undersheriff		The undersheriff is second-in-command of the LASD.
Assistant sheriff		There are four assistant sheriffs;one is in charge of patrol operations,one is in charge of custody operations, one is in charge of countywide operations, and one who is responsible for acting as the chief financial & administrative officer.
Division chief		Division chiefs are in charge of a division within the LASD, which may provide specialized services (such as the detective division) or cover a geographic area (such as the North Patrol Division).
Area commander		Area commanders are in charge of an area, which typically encompasses two or three stations, or they are also in charge of a command.
Captain		Captains are in charge of a station or a bureau.
Lieutenant		Lieutenants are in charge of a patrol shift or serve as a staff officer.
Sergeant		Sergeants are responsible for supervising deputies.
Deputy Sheriff (Master Field Training Officer)		Master field training officers (MFTOs) are deputies who have permanently qualified for the position of field training new deputies.
Bonus Deputy Sheriff		"Bonus deputies" are deputy sheriffs with specialized skills or expertise that warrant providing them higher pay.
Deputy Sheriff		
Deputy Sheriff Trainee		Deputy sheriff trainees (DSTs) are non-sworn employees undergoing the 22-week-long Peace Officer Standards and Training (POST) academy.

== Members killed on duty ==
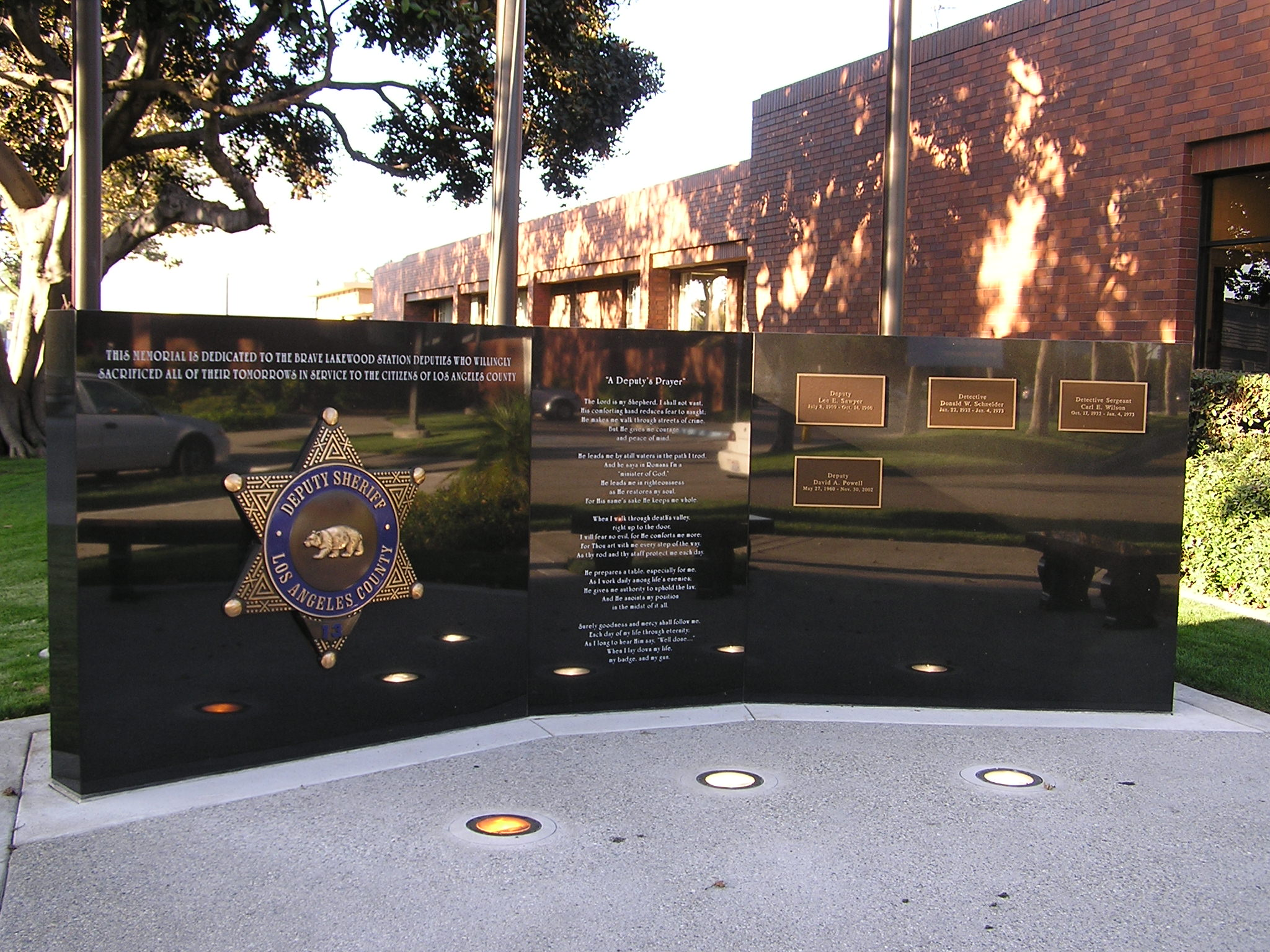
Memorial to deputies killed on duty. Located outside the LASD Lakewood Station.

As of 2023, 139 sheriff's deputies have been killed in the line of duty since the department's founding in 1850.

== Awards, commendations, citations and medals ==
For bravery

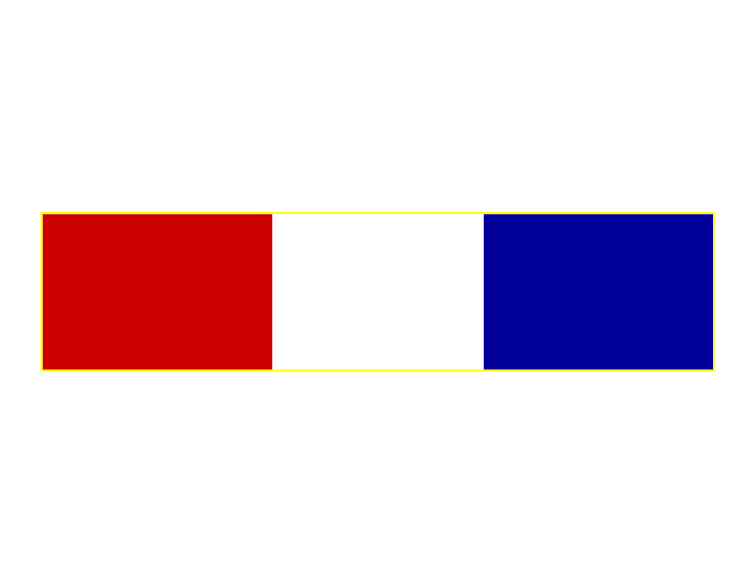
- Medal of Valor
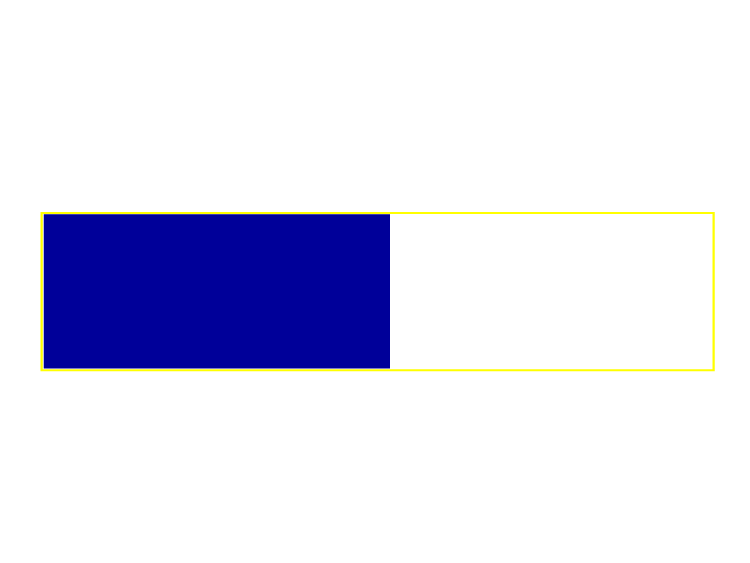
- Meritorious Conduct Gold Medal
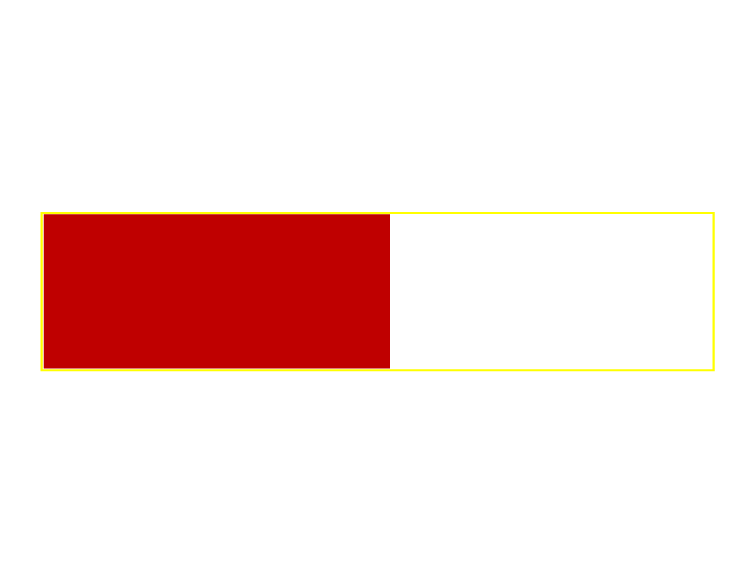
- Meritorious Conduct Silver Medal

Other

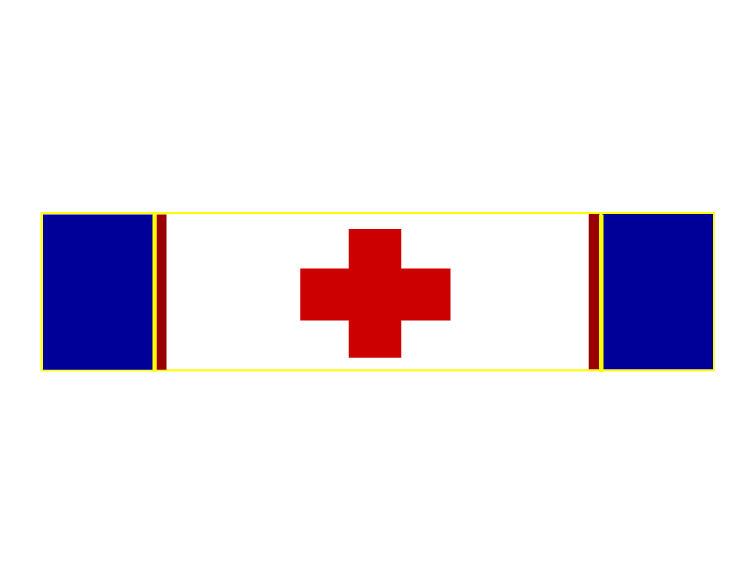
- Lifesaving Award
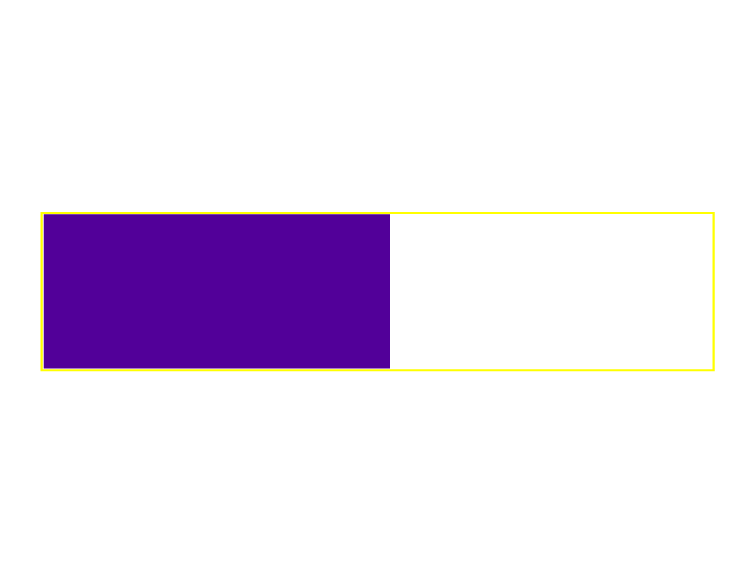
- Purple Heart Award
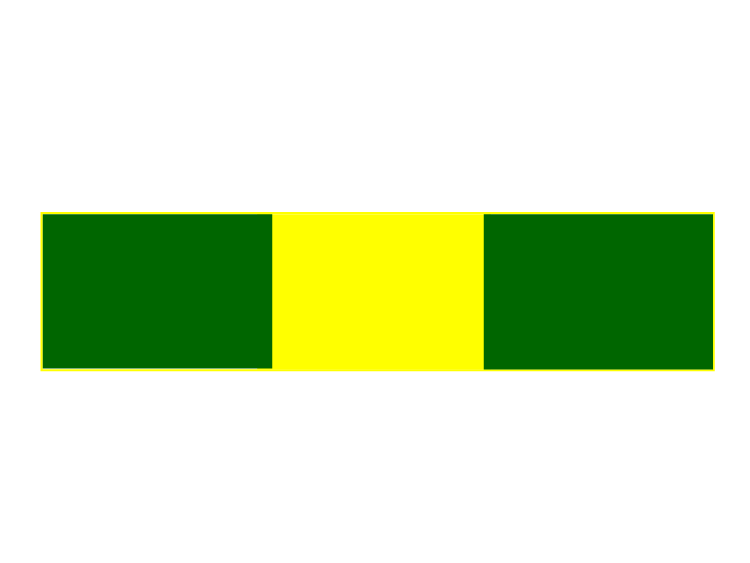
- Meritorious Service Award
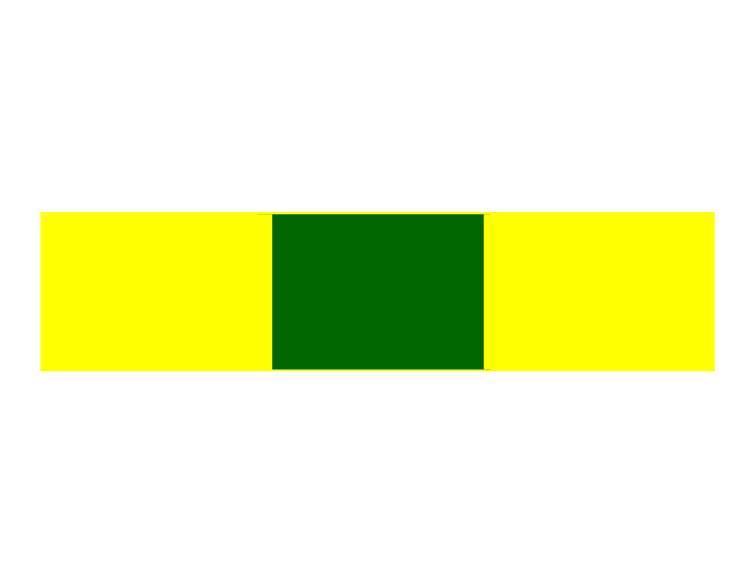
- Exemplary Service Award
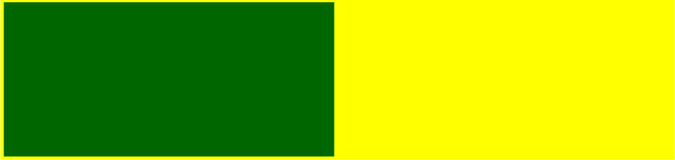
- Distinguished Service Award
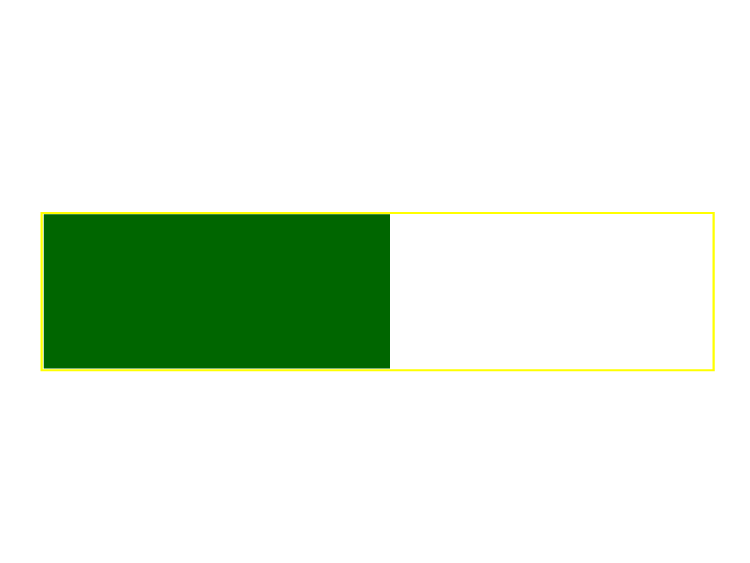
- Humanitarian Award
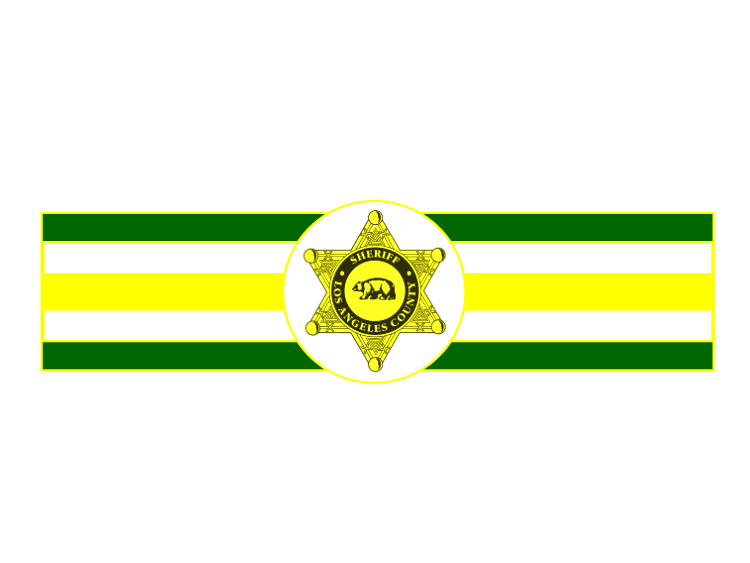
- Unit Commander Award

== In popular culture ==
- The Sheriff's Department Emergency Services Detail was depicted in the fictional television series, 240-Robert, which ran from 1979 to 1981.
- 1989 film Dead Bang stars Don Johnson as an LASD homicide detective.
- 2003 - 2004 TV series 10-8: Officers on Duty depicted a rookie deputy in the LASD.
- 2018 film Den of Thieves stars Gerard Butler as a LASD deputy.
- 2013 Video Game Grand Theft Auto 5 features a fictional representation of the LASD in the form of the Los Santos County Sheriff's Department (LSSD) which patrols the rural and desert areas of San Andreas, a parody of California.
- 2020 TV series Deputy is about a new Sheriff of Los Angeles County, the characters are mostly LA County Sheriff's Deputies, with it involving the duties that they have almost entirely.

== See also ==
- List of law enforcement agencies in California
