= Andrea Drummer =

American cannabis chef

Andrea Drummer is a cannabis chef and co-owner of the Original Cannabis Cafe, the first legal cannabis restaurant in the US.

== Early life and education ==
Drummer grew up in Fort Lauderdale, Florida in a conservative religious household. She attended Le Cordon Bleu in Pasadena.

== Career ==
Before becoming interested in cannabis cuisine, Drummer worked as a drug counselor. When she first moved to Los Angeles, she worked for an attorney who used pot daily, an experience that changed her view on marijuana. She worked for Thomas Keller and cooked under chef Neal Fraser at Redbird and Vibiana in Los Angeles. Drummer also cooked at the Ritz-Carlton in Los Angeles.

In 2012 Drummer created Elevation VIP Cooperative and began hosting private cannabis events in Los Angeles. According to High Times her culinary style combines French technique and Southern influences. She created a room service CBD menu for the James Hotel in New York City.

=== Original Cannabis Cafe ===
Drummer's partners in the Cannabis Cafe originally were the cannabis collective Lowell Herb Co. She and Lowell lobbied the city of West Hollywood for a license to open a cannabis cafe, a process that took over three years. The restaurant originally opened in 2019 as the Lowell Cafe. It was the first cannabis restaurant in the United States.US. Drummer and Lowell Herb Co parted ways in 2019, with Drummer taking over the restaurant.

=== Books ===
Drummer wrote Cannabis Cuisine: Bud Pairings of a Born Again Chef (2017), which was described by Nation's Restaurant News as a "landmark book".

Drummer co-authored Willie & Annie Nelson’s Cannabis Cookbook (2024), where she contributed writings, all recipes and 100% of the photography

=== Television ===
Drummer won the first episode of the Netflix cannabis cuisine competition series Cooking on High and appeared on Chelsea Does.

Chef Drummer Executive Produced a Spotify digital series called Breaking Bread, where she hosted celebrities like Wiz Khalifa, Noriega, Wlla, Ty Dolla, Young Miami and more.

== Recognition ==
LA Weekly called her "a pioneering leader in both the culinary and cannabis industries" and a "world-class marijuana chef".
