= Lindsey Horvath =

American politician (born 1982)

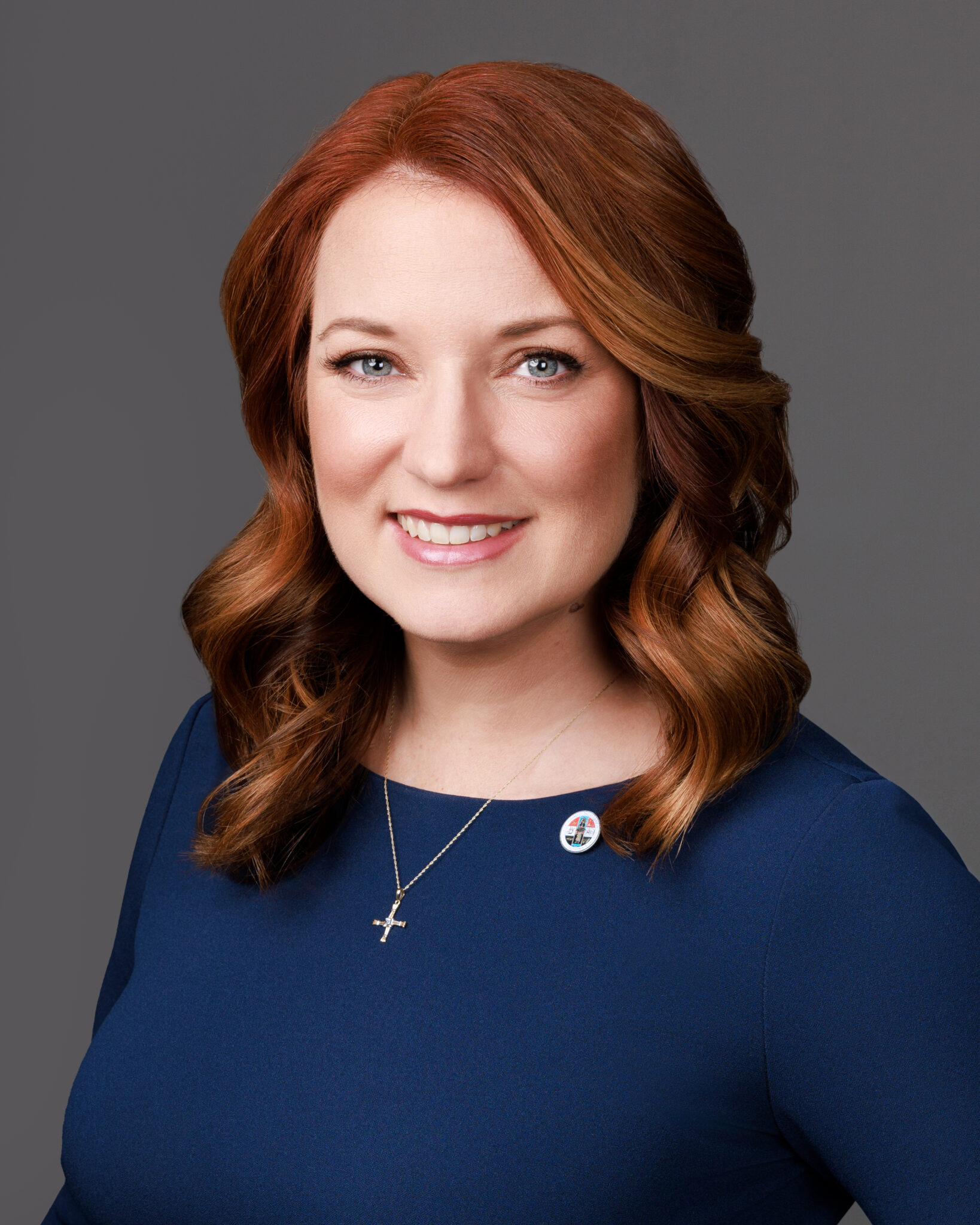
- Official portrait, 2023

Chair of Los Angeles County
- In office December 5, 2023 – December 3, 2024
- Preceded by: Janice Hahn
- Succeeded by: Kathryn Barger

Member of the Los Angeles County Board of Supervisors from the 3rd district
- Incumbent
- Assumed office December 5, 2022
- Preceded by: Sheila Kuehl

Mayor of West Hollywood
- In office May 18, 2020 – September 20, 2021
- Preceded by: John D'Amico
- Succeeded by: Lauren Meister
- In office April 30, 2015 – April 30, 2016
- Preceded by: John D'Amico
- Succeeded by: Lauren Meister

Personal details
- Born: June 30, 1982 (age 44) Painesville, Ohio, U.S.
- Party: Republican (before 2003); Democratic (2003–present)
- Education: University of Notre Dame (BA)

Lindsey Patrice Horvath (born June 30, 1982) is an American politician, advertising executive, and activist. She is currently serving as a member of the Los Angeles County Board of Supervisors for the 3rd District, which covers the San Fernando Valley and parts of the Westside and Central Los Angeles, and served as chair of Los Angeles County in 2024. She was previously a councilmember for West Hollywood, California and was twice its mayor.

== Early life and career ==
Horvath was born in 1982 in Painesville, Ohio, growing up in Wickliffe, Ohio and Las Vegas, Nevada before going to the University of Notre Dame in Indiana. She has one younger brother but comes from a large family, with her parents being the youngest of multi-sibling households. She attended Catholic schools in Ohio and private high school in Las Vegas. As a teenager, Gloria Allred and Hillary Clinton were some of her role models, both of whom she would later meet. While at Notre Dame, Horvath was a registered Republican, but switched her party affiliation to Democratic in 2003. She graduated from the University of Notre Dame in 2004 cum laude with a Bachelor of Arts in political science and gender studies. At Notre Dame, she participated in a performance of The Vagina Monologues which caused controversy with the administration, and also was vice president of the College Republicans.

She moved to Los Angeles, California after graduating from college intending to go into law school, and attended musical theater school instead. After working in advertising, she founded the Hollywood chapter of the National Organization for Women (NOW). In 2007, she was appointed to the Women's Advisory Board for West Hollywood, and was elected chair after eight months.

== Political career ==
=== West Hollywood ===
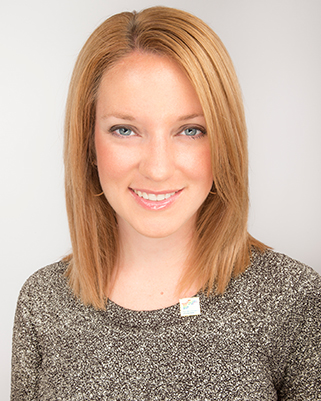
Horvath as a West Hollywood Councilmember.

On May 6, 2009, Horvath was appointed to the West Hollywood City Council after the death of Councilman Sal Guarriello, which upset some residents as Horvath had lived in the city for only two years. While in her first term in the City Council, she continued an effort she'd started before her appointment to secure funding to test DNA on a severe backlog of over 5,000 untested rape kits. On March 10, 2011, she lost her first election to John D’Amico. On March 3, 2015, she was elected back onto the City Council, defeating John Heilman. After her swearing in, councilmember John Duran filed a motion to make Horvath the mayor for the coming year, which was approved by the Council unanimously. As a councilmember and mayor, she helped approve the minimum wage of $17.64 per hour and helped with the downsizing of the number of sheriffs in the city.

On April 20, 2020, the City Council chose Horvath as mayor for a second time, with John Heilman as the Mayor Pro Tempore. She was sworn in for a second time on May 18, 2020. Her second term expired on September 20, 2021, to which her Mayor Pro Tempore, Lauren Meister, became mayor for a second time.

=== Los Angeles County Board of Supervisors ===
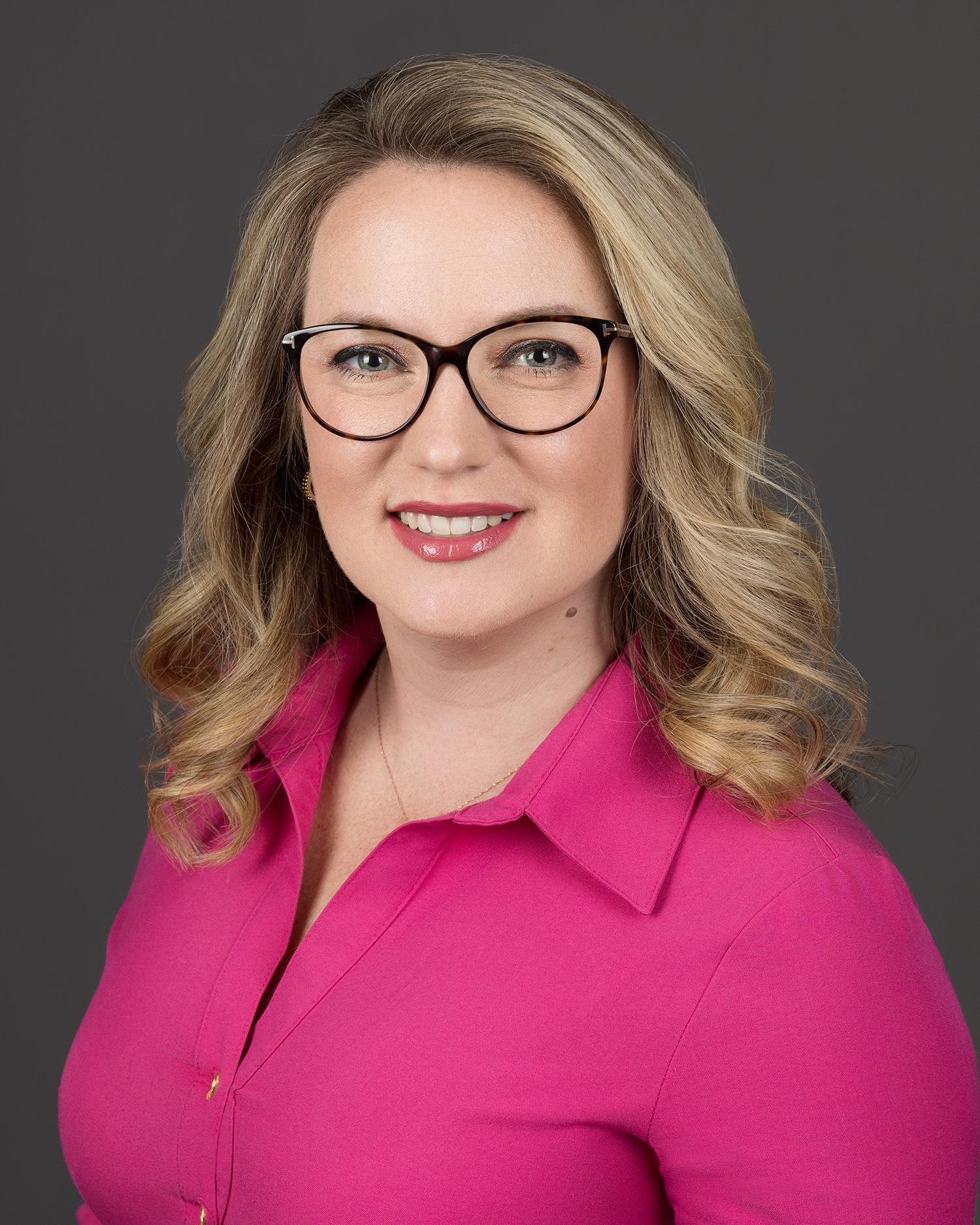
Horvath on the Board of Supervisors in 2022.

In 2021, Horvath announced that she was running to replace Sheila Kuehl on the Los Angeles County Board of Supervisors after Kuehl said she would retire. She was challenged by State Senators Robert Hertzberg and Henry Stern, with Stern being eliminated in the primary election after placing third. During her campaign, she received criticism for removing parts of her biography pertaining to West Hollywood. In the general election, Horvath upset Hertzberg with 52.97% of the vote.

==== Disaster response ====
Horvath established the Blue Ribbon Commission on Wildfire Recovery, an independent body tasked with evaluating and recommending improvements to the County’s disaster response. Released in 2025, recommended the creation of a Resilient Rebuilding Authority to coordinate future recovery efforts.

==== Environment ====
In February 2024, Horvath co-authored a motion with Hilda Solis to require county departments to prioritize plant-based food procurement by default when signing new foodservice contracts. In January 2025, Horvath and Solis co-authored a motion to recommend that departments serve a 2:1 ratio of plant-based to non-plant-based entrees and require daily vegan meal options in all county food programs. Horvath stated that increasing plant-based procurement would help reduce the county's food-based greenhouse gas emissions.

In 2025, Horvath led the development and release of the Los Angeles County Water Plan, the County’s first comprehensive water plan. The plan set a goal of achieving 80% locally sourced water supply by 2045.

==== Government reform ====
In 2024, Horvath co-authored Measure G, a charter reform measure approved by voters that expanded the Board of Supervisors, created an elected County Executive, and established an independent Ethics Commission.

The Capitol Weekly article “Change Agent: Lindsey Horvath and the massive reform of LA County governance” profiles Supervisor Lindsey Horvath’s efforts to lead and pass Measure G, a sweeping restructuring of Los Angeles County government. In November 2026, Horvath announced plans to run for the LA County Executive position.

==== Housing ====
Shortly after assuming office, Horvath authored a proclamation of local emergency for homelessness in Los Angeles County.

In the aftermath of the January 2025 Southern California wildfires, Horvath requested that state housing laws be temporarily waived in Los Angeles County. The state housing laws in question incentivized increases in housing supply. Housing advocates criticized Horvath's request, arguing that it would hinder needed housing construction in the aftermath of the fires.

Horvath also introduced emergency tenant protections and anti-price gouging measures to support residents displaced by the fires.

Political offices
Preceded by Janice Hahn	Chair of Los Angeles County; 2023–2024	Succeeded by Kathryn Barger
