= Trev Broudy =

American actor

- Born: Treve G. Broudy; October 21, 1968 (age 57); Santa Barbara, California, U.S.
- Occupation: Actor

Trev "Trev" G. Broudy (born October 21, 1968) is an American actor and former model. Broudy came to national attention when he became the victim of a violent attack in 2002, which touched off a national discussion of hate crimes, drawing comparisons to the Matthew Shepard case.

On September 1, 2002, Broudy and friend Edward Ulett were attacked after embracing outside Broudy's West Hollywood, California home by three black male assailants, Larry Walker, Torwin Sessions and Vincent Dotson. Broudy was beaten with a baseball bat and left in a coma for 10 days. In response the West Hollywood gay community organized a candlelight vigil.

Upon his regaining consciousness, Broudy's doctors determined that he had suffered permanent brain damage and was left legally blind. Part of his skull was replaced with a metal plate.

Walker, Sessions and Dotson were initially charged with attempted robbery, assault with a deadly weapon and conspiracy to commit robbery. Republican Los Angeles County District Attorney Steve Cooley declined to press hate crime charges, a decision that sparked outrage in the community. West Hollywood City Councilmember Sal Guarriello and his political consultants immediately launched a recall campaign against Cooley to demonstrate their disgust for what they believed to be Cooley's homophobia. Cooley stated that he believed the motive to be robbery, not bias, a conclusion that Broudy disagreed with. After the preliminary hearing, an additional charge of aggravated mayhem was added for each defendant.

On August 27, 2003, Walker pleaded guilty to all charges and a day later Sessions and Dotson did the same. Walker was sentenced to 13 years in prison, Dotson received a seven-year sentence and Sessions was sentenced to 21 years.

== Career ==
Prior to the attack, Broudy was best known for a small role in the independent film The Fluffer. After the attack, he narrated the 2003 VH1 special Totally Gay! in which he countered the generally light-hearted tone of the special by describing the attack and the devastating effects on his life. Broudy has appeared in a number of guest roles in a variety of television series and has started a career as a voice actor, performing in television and radio commercials and playing Cole Yeager in Tom Clancy's Splinter Cell: Double Agent and Captain America in Marvel Ultimate Alliance.
