= Wehoville =

American hyper-local news website based in West Hollywood

WEHOville (WEHOonline)
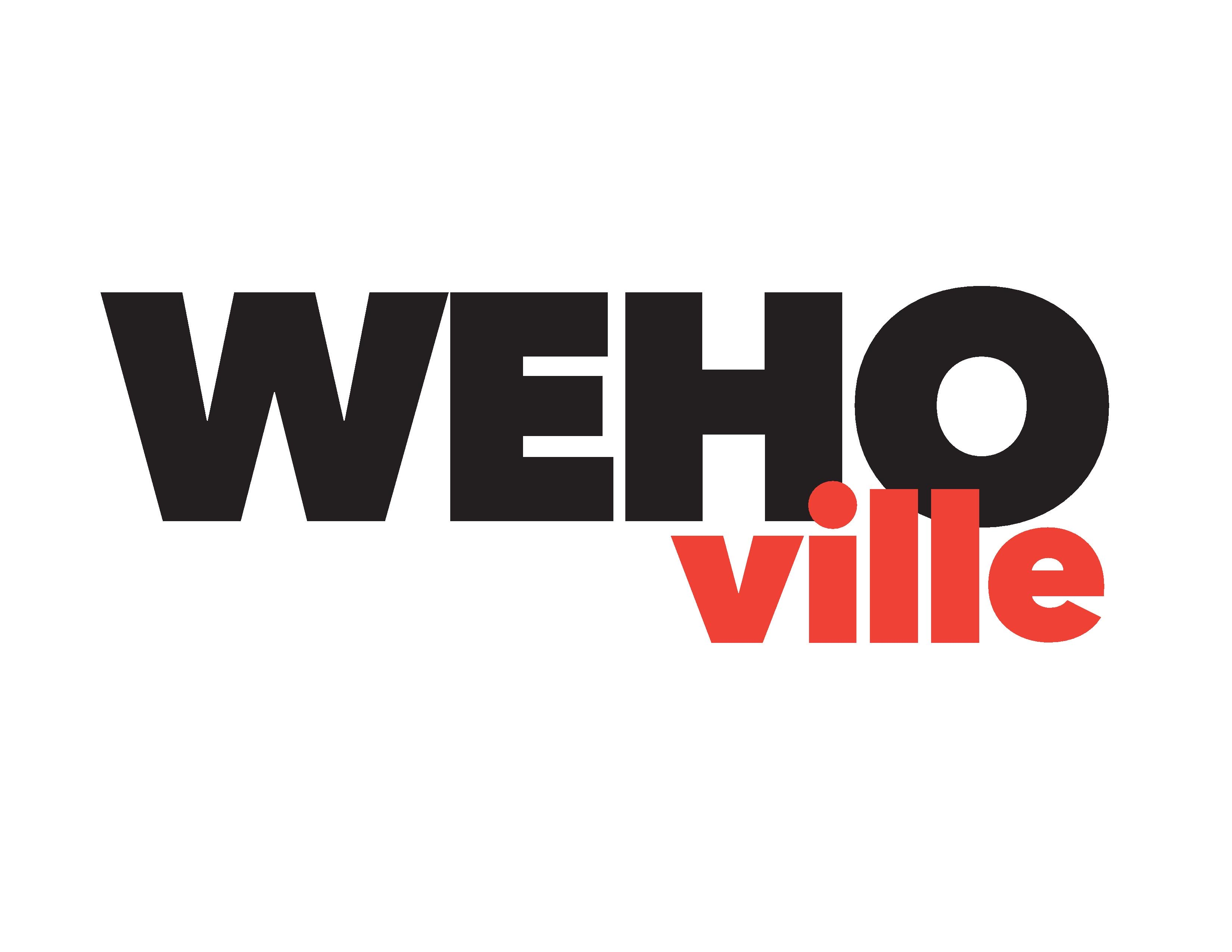
- Website type: Local news, journalism
- Available in: English
- Owner: Boystown Media Inc.
- Creator: Henry (Hank) Scott
- Editors: Brian Holt (managing editor and president of Boystown Media)
- Website: wehoonline.com
- Commercial: Yes
- Registration: Optional (for commenting)
- Launched: 2011
- Current status: Active

WEHOville (since rebranded as WEHOonline) is an American hyper-local digital news publication based in West Hollywood, California. Launched in 2011 by former newspaper executive Henry (Hank) Scott, the website covers local politics, real estate, public safety, and LGBTQ community news in West Hollywood and the surrounding Los Angeles area. It has been cited as an example of digital-only, hyper-local news media.

== History ==
=== Founding and early years ===
WEHOville was launched in 2011 by Henry (Hank) Scott, who moved to West Hollywood to start the digital-only news site. Scott had a long career in newspaper journalism before founding the site; he oversaw the launch of the first online edition of The New York Times in the mid-1990s and later established a Russian-language edition of the paper published in Moscow. Dan Watson was part of the site's early team before joining the Los Angeles Times, where he later worked as a deputy digital editor.

Under Scott's ownership the publication became known for reporting on the West Hollywood City Council, local real-estate development, and civic controversies. In 2021 the trade magazine Editor & Publisher interviewed Scott about WEHOville for a feature on building a viable business model for a hyper-local digital news website.

=== Sale and change of ownership (2020–2021) ===
Scott sold WEHOville around 2020 and 2021 through a two-step transaction rather than directly to its later publisher. In November 2020 he sold the WEHOville.com domain to KF Media, a Las Vegas corporation; in April 2021 the newly formed Boystown Media Inc. purchased the publication from KF Media. The principals associated with Boystown Media included West Hollywood retailer Larry Block, who became the publication's publisher.

Following the change in ownership the publication rebranded its primary domain to WEHOonline (wehoonline.com). Under Block, the site shifted its editorial focus toward small businesses, community events, and local personalities.

=== Editorial criticism ===
The publication's editorial direction and comment sections drew criticism from other local outlets and community figures. Independent West Hollywood outlets described WEHOonline as running negative articles and opinion pieces targeting progressive council members and questioned the site's objectivity. During Block's 2024 run for the West Hollywood City Council, an anonymous complaint to the city attorney accused him of posting comments on the site under an assumed name; Block denied the accusation, saying another commenter had impersonated him.

In 2023, founder Henry Scott published an opinion piece titled "A Eulogy to My WEHOville" in the competing outlet WEHO Times, expressing regret over selling the site and criticizing what he described as the tone of the publication under its new ownership.

=== Editorial transition (2025–present) ===
In November 2025, publisher Larry Block introduced media producer Brian Holt as the site's managing editor. Before joining the publication, Holt founded and executive-produced CHANNEL Q, an LGBTQ+ national radio and podcast network launched by Audacy in 2018, and had earlier produced radio programming for iHeartRadio.

As Block moved toward a 2026 campaign for the West Hollywood City Council, he stepped back from WEHOonline, and Holt took over its editorial operations; Holt subsequently became president of the publication's parent company, Boystown Media Inc.

== See also ==
- Media in Los Angeles
- LGBT culture in Los Angeles
