= John Duran =

American municipal politician

John J. Duran
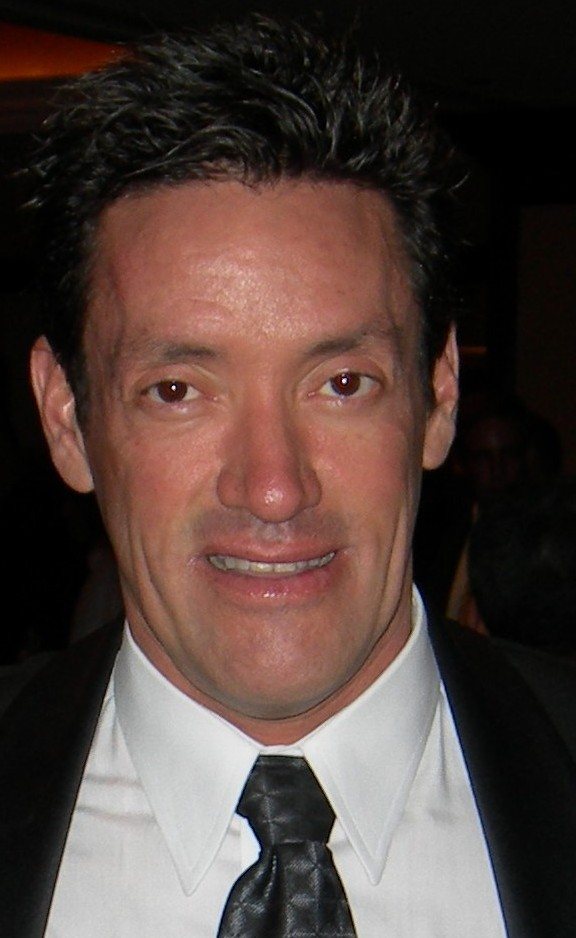
- Duran in 2007

Mayor of West Hollywood
- In office May 21, 2018 – March 4, 2019
- Preceded by: John Heilman
- Succeeded by: John D'Amico

Member of the West Hollywood City Council
- In office March 6, 2001 – December 20, 2020
- Preceded by: Paul Koretz
- Succeeded by: John M. Erickson

Personal details
- Born: John J. Duran
- Party: Democratic
- Education: California State University, Long Beach (B.A.); Western State University (J.D.)
- Profession: Lawyer

John J. Duran is an American municipal politician and a former mayor of West Hollywood, California.

== Political career ==
Duran was elected to the City Council on March 6, 2001. He succeeded outgoing City Council member Paul Koretz, who was elected to the State Assembly. He previously served on the city's Rent Stabilization Commission. Duran has a long history of involvement with the LGBT community.

One of Duran's stated concerns is alcohol and drug recovery in West Hollywood. Duran secured the site for the West Hollywood Alcohol and Drug Recovery Center. Duran also initiated a series of town hall meetings on crystal methamphetamine that has served as a model for other communities impacted.

Duran is advocating for the historic preservation of the Sunset Strip and the eventual creation of a Rock 'n' Roll Museum.

An openly gay man, Duran is a founding board member of ANGLE (Access Now for Gay and Lesbian Equality). Duran also served as president of the board of directors of Equality California (EQCA), the largest statewide LGBT civil rights organization in the U.S. In addition, Duran is a past board member of the ACLU, Lambda Legal Defense, and the National Gay and Lesbian Task Force.

Duran has worked to defend human rights. His legal cases include Kolcum v. Los Angeles County, where he successfully sued Los Angeles County for denying medication to inmates with HIV/AIDS. Duran defended the Los Angeles Cannabis Resource Center during the medicinal use of marijuana controversy. In 1998, he won the first test case of medicinal marijuana defense since the passage of California's Proposition 215. Other successful cases for Duran include People v. Green, where he successfully defended a defendant charged with assisted suicide. He also served as legal counsel for ACT UP in the late 1980s, was the trial attorney for the Los Angeles Needle Exchange Program, and defended the first amendment rights of numerous protestors.

Duran was identified as one of the 20 most influential members of the gay community by IN LA Magazine. He is one of the very few HIV-positive elected officials in the United States.

Duran is known as a strong advocate for the arts. He is a founder of the West Hollywood Chorale, and collects paintings and Disney memorabilia. Duran is writing a history of the gay rights movement in Southern California.

=== Sexual harassment allegations ===
Council assistants, known as "deputies", once served as full-time employees to the part-time West Hollywood City Council members. In 2015, Ian Owens, the deputy to Councilmember John Duran, accused John Duran of sexual harassment. The city's insurance carrier settled the case with a $500,000 payout to Owens. John Duran and Owens originally met in April 2012 via Grindr, a hook-up app for gay men, and had a sexual encounter. Duran failed to disclose this sexual encounter with Owens to human resources. The scandal became known as Deputygate.

Duran's relationship with Owens has been a major focus in the wrongful termination case of Michelle Rex, another council deputy, who says the city retaliated against her and fired her because she supported Owens' claims of mistreatment. Rex lost that suit in a jury trial in May 2017, but testimony during the trial revealed that Duran had made a sexually derogatory comment about Elyse Eisenberg, head of the West Hollywood Heights Neighborhood Association, in an email exchange with Owens. In testimony before a jury, Owens alleged other sexually improper behavior by Duran at city hall.

On February 5, 2019, the Gay Men's Chorus of Los Angeles announced that Duran would be leaving his position as a board member of that organization after multiple allegations of sexual harassment and misconduct had surfaced, including slipping his hand inside the waistband of a chorus member and making inappropriate comments. Duran stepped down as mayor on March 4, 2019.

Political offices
Preceded by Paul Koretz	Councilman, West Hollywood, California; 2001–2020	Succeeded by John M. Erickson
Preceded by John Heilman	Mayor of West Hollywood, California; 2018–2019	Succeeded by John D'Amico
