= West Hollywood West =

Residential neighborhood in California

Coordinates: 34.080°N 118.381°W

West Hollywood West is a residential neighborhood in West Hollywood, California. It encompasses the area bound by Doheny Drive and Beverly Hills on the west, Melrose Avenue on the north, La Cienega Boulevard on the east and Beverly Boulevard on the south.

The east-west streets of the area are Rangely, Dorrington, Ashcroft and Rosewood Avenues, and Bonner Drive.

The north-south streets are Doheny Drive, Almont Drive, Robertson Boulevard, Sherbourne Drive, San Vicente Boulevard and Norwich, Huntley, Westbourne, Westmount and West Knoll Drives.

The neighborhood is walkable, with cafes and restaurants, malls and movie theatres, parks, libraries, galleries, design shops and the Pacific Design Center in close proximity.

The West Hollywood West neighborhood is represented by West Hollywood West Residents Association ("WHWRA"), one of the city's largest and most organized residents associations. The purpose of the West Hollywood West Residents Association (WHWRA) is to protect the integrity and quality of life within West Hollywood West.

== See also ==
- West Hollywood, California
- Los Angeles, California
- Pacific Design Center
