= Chamberlain West Hollywood Hotel =

Coordinates: 34°05′24″N 118°22′45″W

- Interactive map of the Chamberlain West Hollywood Hotel area

General information
- Location: 1000 Westmount Dr, West Hollywood, CA 90069
- Opening: 2005
- Owner: La Salle Hotel Properties
- Management: Outrigger Lodging Services

Technical details
- Floor count: 4

Other information
- Number of rooms: 114
- Number of suites: 114
- Number of restaurants: 1

Website
- http://www.chamberlainwesthollywood.com

The Chamberlain West Hollywood is a hotel located in the centre of West Hollywood, California. The hotel has 114 suites, each with a private balcony and a gas-log fireplace. The suites average over 500 square feet (46 m^{2}) and include amenities such as 42-inch (1,100 mm) HD televisions, iHome docking stations and designer bath products. The Chamberlain Bistro, the hotel restaurant, is run by Chef Emilio Noselotl and serves American and California cuisine. Other amenities of the Chamberlain West Hollywood include a rooftop pool and boardroom.

== History ==
The hotel was originally constructed in 1970 as an apartment building which was later converted into an all-suite hotel named Le Dufy by L'Ermitage Hotels in 1983. The hotel was rebranded as the Chamberlain West Hollywood in 2005. The hotel was part of the Viceroy Hotel Group from 2005 to 2010 and underwent a $4.5 million renovation from December 2009 to July 2010. The Chamberlain West Hollywood was acquired by La Salle Hotel Properties in December 2010 for $38.5 million and is currently managed by Outrigger Lodging Services.

== Design ==
During Spring 2010, the Chamberlain West Hollywood underwent its first renovation since its opening in 2005, the renovations were overseen by Leslie Barrett of Leslie Barrett Design. The project included the redesign of the suites, hotel interiors, rooftop pool and Bistro. The redesign reflects a contemporary interpretation of sophisticated designs from the 1970s and 1980s, styles that were once eclectic, yet comfortable. Working with a palette of periwinkle and cream, with accents of gold, chocolate and bronze.
