= Sal Guarriello =

American politician

Salvatore Joseph Guarriello
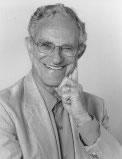
- Councilman Sal Guarriello

Councilman of West Hollywood, California
- In office May 7, 1990 – April 16, 2009
- Preceded by: Helen Albert
- Succeeded by: Lindsey Horvath

Mayor of West Hollywood, California
- In office April 7, 1997 – April 6, 1998
- Preceded by: Paul Koretz
- Succeeded by: Steve Martin

Personal details
- Born: March 2, 1919 New York City, New York
- Died: April 16, 2009 (aged 90) Los Angeles, California
- Party: Democratic
- Spouse: Rita Gionta (deceased)

Salvatore Joseph Guarriello (March 2, 1919 – April 16, 2009) was a member of the City Council of the City of West Hollywood, California. He was elected to the City Council in 1990, and reelected four times. He served four one-year terms as mayor. He was an advocate for West Hollywood residents, protected tenants of low-income housing, promoted West Hollywood's businesses, and upheld public safety.

== Early life ==
Salvatore Joseph Guarriello, son of Generoso Guarriello and Virginia (D'Argenio) Guarriello, was born March 2, 1919, in the New York City borough of Manhattan in New York state. Sal Guarriello was the fifth of six siblings; he had one sister who was the eldest, and four brothers. He was born into a Catholic, Italian family originally from Avellino; a city near Naples in southwest Italy.

At age eighteen, Guarriello began working as a guard with the United States Marshal Service transporting prisoners to federal penitentiaries from New York City to Lewisburg, Pennsylvania, and Atlanta, Georgia. At nineteen, Guarriello became a lifeguard securing and overseeing the Island Park Beach, also known as Casino Beach.

At age twenty he was recruited by a larger establishment known as Sperry Gyroscope (Sperry Corporation), a company which manufactured gauges and instruments for U.S. fighter planes. While working for Sperry Gyroscope, he met Rita Gionta, an inspector who represented the Navy's division. Gionta was the inspector who overlooked Guarriello's quality control department. Guarriello and Rita were married on November 21, 1943.

His career in the manufacturing industry was short-lived because in January 1944, two months before his twenty-fifth birthday, Guarriello was drafted into the US Military service in the Second World War.

== Military service ==
Upon being drafted into the service, Guarriello was transported to Florida to receive training as a sniper. After six months of training, he was deployed to Anzio, Italy, where the heaviest beach combats took place. Due to the high bloodshed, and the lack of medical personnel, Guarriello was appointed as a combat medic. Ironically, he was given this responsibility because of his experience as a lifeguard during his adolescence.

On April 19, 1945, Guarriello was wounded during an effort to save another comrade's life. During a heavy mortar and machine gun battle, a soldier from Guarriello's company lost his leg from a mortar explosion. As the company was retreating from the battlefield, Guarriello went back into the field to rescue the soldier. While he was showing medical attention to the wounded soldier, a mortar exploded behind Guarriello piercing him with shrapnel in his left arm and upper back. On April 26, 1945, while recovering in a hospital in Florence, the Brigadier General awarded Guarriello a Purple Heart for being wounded in the line of duty.

== Early professional career ==
After coming home from the war, Guarriello purchased a house in Long Island, New York and founded a State Farm Insurance Agency franchise. He later decided to expand his business ventures by moving out to the West Coast in 1964. Los Angeles, California, was of particular interest to Guarriello because of the large residential and automobile market. Guarriello established his Farmers Insurance Company agency franchise there and it continued to be a successful operation until he retired in December 1986, at the age of sixty-seven.

== Political career ==
As a resident of West Hollywood and longtime fixture on the Sunset Strip with his friend, the legendary Dean Martin, Guarriello joined the Coalition for Economic Survival (CES), the leading renters' rights organization in 1983. He joined CES's Steering Committee in 1986. In 1986, Guarriello became a member of the Board of Directors of the West Hollywood Community Housing Corporation (WHCHC), a non-profit corporation which rehabilitates run-down housing and builds new apartment buildings to increase the supply of affordable housing in West Hollywood. He was soon selected by his fellow Board members to serve as Treasurer of the organization. Guarriello was also featured in an A&E Television biography of the Sunset Strip.

The work of the WHCHC has been so successful that West Hollywood is replacing apartments lost to demolition with more than three times as many new affordable apartments. By January 1999, 141 low- and moderate-income housing units had been built in West Hollywood.

In 1988, Guarriello was appointed to the Rent Stabilization Commission. As a Commissioner, he helped develop policy on rent control matters and sat as judge on appeals of decisions made by Rent Stabilization Hearing Examiners. While striving to be fair and impartial, Guarriello worked hard to protect West Hollywood tenants and the City's strong rent control law. Guarriello also served on the City's Banking and Reinvestment Task Force in 1988, where he worked with local banks to improve low-cost services to seniors and small businesses.

In April 1990, with seven years of experience serving the West Hollywood community, Guarriello was elected as a member of the West Hollywood City Council. He was reelected to the West Hollywood City Council four times: in April 1994, March 1999, March 2003, and March 2007. Guarriello, a gruff but lovable character, was famous for his bust of President Harry S Truman on his modest desk and used the slogan "Give 'em Hell, Sal..." in each of his re-election campaigns. While he faced tough opposition in each of his election campaigns, Sal's support from seniors, Russians and the LGBT community gave him an electoral base and success.

Guarriello formed the Eastside Redevelopment Agency in 1997. The agency's first major project was the West Hollywood Gateway Project at Santa Monica Boulevard and La Brea Avenue. In 1998, he helped negotiate the transfer of ownership of Santa Monica Boulevard from the State of California, Department of Transportation to the City of West Hollywood. This transfer of ownership allowed the City to plan for a major rehabilitation of the Boulevard in 1999.

Guarriello was awarded the "Outstanding Community Service Award" from the Los Angeles County Commission on Aging in May 2006. Sal was a tireless fighter for the issues that mattered most to him: affordable housing and the rights of Senior Citizens. To assist with his efforts, Guarriello recruited a local public safety activist, Donna Saur, to serve as his office deputy in 1999. Saur began working with Guarriello on many issues that required more immediate legislative attention, and she faithfully remained with him until his death. In 2002, Guarriello, with the assistance of his veteran political consultants Steven Afriat and Neal Zaslavsky, began the recall process against Los Angeles District Attorney Steve Cooley after a gay resident of West Hollywood, Trev Broudy, was nearly beaten to death with a baseball bat by three men, because Cooley considered this crime a robbery rather than a hate crime. Although he himself was straight, Sal was a fierce advocate for the city's large Gay & Lesbian population, and a majority of his appointments to city boards and commissions were gay men and lesbians.

Since Guarriello served as an army combat medic in World War II, in 1998 he initiated the West Hollywood Veterans Memorial Task Force to create a permanent Veterans Memorial in West Hollywood. In the spring of 2001 the City of West Hollywood approved a Veterans Memorial intended to honor all veterans who have served the United States since the 1776 Revolution. The West Hollywood Veteran's Memorial in Holloway Park was dedicated on November 11, 2003. On September 25, 2009, the city council unanimously voted to rename the park as the Sal Guarriello Veterans Memorial Park.

Until the time of his death, Sal continued to serve on many civic boards and enjoy a good Scotch. Guarriello represented West Hollywood as a director and chairman of the County Sanitation District No. 4 representing West Hollywood, Beverly Hills, and Los Angeles. He also served as the City's delegate for the Southern California Cities Joint Powers Consortium. He was a delegate to the Joint Powers Insurance Authority, and served as a commissioner on the County Public Library Commission.

90-year-old Councilmember Guarriello died on the morning of Thursday, April 16, 2009, at Cedars-Sinai Medical Center, surrounded by his friends, family and political supporters. At the time of his death, Sal was the oldest serving city councilmember in California. On May 6, the City Council appointed former National Organization for Women Hollywood Chapter President Lindsey Horvath to complete Guarriello's unexpired term. His seat was later filled by John D'Amico, who was elected in March 2011.
