= Totally Gay! =

2003 television special

- Narrated by: Briggy Smale
- Country of origin: United States
- Original language: English

Production
- Executive producers: Randy Barbato; Fenton Bailey
- Producer: Thairin Smothers
- Running time: 44 minutes

Original release
- Network: VH1
- Release: August 18, 2003

Totally Gay! is an American television special broadcast by VH1. The special premiered on August 18, 2003. It centrally focused on gay pop culture in the United States. The content of the show included sitcoms (Will & Grace), gay icons (Kyle and Lane Carlson, who say they are not gay), and the most popular dog breed (pug).

The somewhat light-hearted tone of the show was balanced at the end by narrator Trev Broudy discussing the assault that he had suffered shortly before the program was recorded, which left him with permanent brain damage.

A follow-up documentary titled Totally Gayer premiered on March 10, 2004.
