= Original Cannabis Cafe =

- Location within Western Los Angeles

Restaurant information
- Established: October 2019
- Owners: Andrea Drummer; Renee Nahum; Houston Hospitality; Famous Farms; Lowell Herb Co; 710 Labs
- Head chef: Andrea Drummer
- Food type: Farm-to-table
- Location: 1201 North La Brea Avenue, West Hollywood, Los Angeles County, California, 90038, United States
- Coordinates: 34.092668°N 118.3466097°W
- Seating capacity: 220
- Reservations: Yes
- Other information: 10am – 10pm
- Website: cannabis.cafe

The Original Cannabis Cafe, known previously as Lowell Farms: A Cannabis Cafe until December 2019, is an indoor-outdoor restaurant located in West Hollywood, California. It is the first cannabis restaurant in the United States and opened on October 1, 2019, founded by 11 partners and investors including Houston Hospitality. The cafe has a flower menu and farm-to-table cuisine that is "designed to enhance the cannabis experience." Budtenders, also known as "flower hosts", are available to give suggestions on which strains of cannabis pair best with each meal and will roll a joint for the patrons at the table.

== Background ==
Although the Adult Use of Marijuana Act legalized cannabis in California, the proposition prohibited the use of cannabis in public places, in addition to hotels, rentals and vehicles. The West Hollywood City Council determined in 2017 that access to "safe spaces" for consuming cannabis was a social equity issue and also decided to allow places for cannabis tourists. City ordinances restrict public consumption.

In May 2018, the West Hollywood City Council opened up applications for 16 onsite cannabis consumption licenses, split into two categories; eight licenses for smoking, vaping, edibles and eight licenses for edibles only. It received more than 300 applicants who were critiqued on categories such as innovation and social equity. During the application process, Lowell Herb Co submitted an idea for "Flore Flora", a restaurant and lounge hybrid.

=== Licensing and restrictions ===
In July 2019, the West Hollywood Business License Commission had approved a cannabis consumption license to "Lowell Farms: A Cannabis Cafe," which became the first cannabis café in the United States. The restaurant is 21+ and does not serve alcoholic beverages. It cannot serve cannabis-infused foods until approved by the U.S. Food and Drug Administration, but does have pre-packaged edible cannabis available as well as other cannabis products. All items purchased at the cafe must be consumed onsite except for food. The restaurant changed its name to Original Cannabis Cafe in December 2019, also receiving "Surprise of the Year" from Eater Los Angeles' end of year awards.

== Menu and design ==
Andrea Drummer is the restaurant's chef and has stated that the menu is "designed to complement the actual cannabis that will be consumed". Original Cannabis Cafe has farm-to-table cuisine that budtenders can pair with farm-to-table cannabis to roll joints at the table. The opening menu includes entrées such as "grilled peaches and burrata, a fried chicken sandwich and white bean hummus with crudités" with desserts such as "peanut butter cookies, sweet potato beignets and crème brûlée."

The cafe partnered with community activist Renee Nahum to develop a "concept that would be a first-class representation of the ethos and social consciousness in the community of West Hollywood." Its tilework was imported from Spain and Morocco. The restaurant cost $3 million to open and seats 220 people with an air filtration system and live hanging plants inside and outside for the smoke.

== See also ==
- Legality of cannabis by U.S. jurisdiction
