= Lowell Herb Co =

American cannabis company based in California

- Industry: Cannabis
- Founded: 2017
- Founder: David Elias
- Headquarters: Santa Barbara, California
- Key people: George Allen, Chairman; Mark Ainsworth, CEO
- Products: Flower, prerolls
- Number of employees: 135+
- Website: lowellsmokes.com

Lowell Herb Co is a California-based cannabis brand owned by Lowell Farms that sells packs of pre-rolled joints in varying blends, including seasonal crops.

In 2020, California cannabis company Indus Holdings, Inc. acquired the Lowell portfolio, subsequently rebranding itself as Lowell Farms.

== Lowell Farms ==
=== Origin ===
The company claims the farm was originally established in 1909 by William "Bull" Lowell and was closed by Henry J. Finger in California in 1913. However, a 2018 profile in The New Yorker makes it clear that Lowell is a fictional character and that the company was actually established in 2017, "shortly after Proposition 64 reversed California’s marijuana prohibition."

== Operations ==
=== Expansion ===
Lowell Herb Co. debuted a "weed bouquet" in February 2017 as a Valentine's Day offering, which was available for delivery in the Los Angeles area. The company expanded the offering after its initial popularity. The bouquet is made with an ounce of Purple Princess accented with wildflowers and eucalyptus.

In June 2018, Lowell began hiring pardoned non-violent, marijuana-related offenders for package design, sales, marketing, distribution, shipping and customer service positions. The company asserted that many job applicants in the United States are removed from consideration for having misdemeanor or felony cannabis offenses. After the city of West Hollywood approved lounges and eateries for cannabis consumption, the company announced that a rooftop restaurant known as Lowell Farms: A Cannabis Cafe would open in 2019. The cafe opened on October 1, 2019, becoming the first business to secure a fully legal (at the state and local levels, marijuana still being classified as a Schedule I drug under the federal Controlled Substances Act of 1970) cannabis consumption license in the United States.

In April 2021, Lowell Herb Co. announced a licensing agreement with Ascend Wellness Holdings that would bring Lowell pre-roll products to Illinois and Massachusetts.

=== Partnerships ===
In 2019, Lowell collaborated with CJ Wallace, the son of rapper The Notorious B.I.G., and Think BIG to release The Frank White Creative Blend. The pre-roll pack was inspired by Biggie's "Frank White" alter-ego and uses a custom blend of Orange Sherbet, Banjo, and Rattlesnake Sour Diesel. Other investors include Miley Cyrus, Sarah Silverman, Mark Ronson, and Chris Rock.

== Products ==
In March 2017, the company released a weed flower crown aimed at Coachella participants. The crown featured Lowell's "Coachella Blend" cannabis and is available only to customers preordering the "Coachella pack" through Palm Springs Safe Access dispensary. After receiving a cease-and-desist letter from AEG Presents, the parent company of the music festival, concerning use of the name Coachella, Lowell changed the name of its Coachella products to "NotChilla".

Lowell introduced a "cannabis bouquet" including and stemmed cannabis as well as an Eight Nights of Chanukah pack of different cannabis strains per night during the winter of 2018.

LOWELL 35'S On Sept. 29th 2022 Lowell began sales of the Lowell 35's. Initially only available at a limited amount of dispensaries throughout California. Since launch they have become available at more dispensaries. Lowell 35's launched in three packs Trailblazer, Mind Safari, and Stargazer. Information from the site: Lowell 35's offer unparalleled quality and exceptional smokeability.
