= West Hollywood, California =

City in California, United States

- City
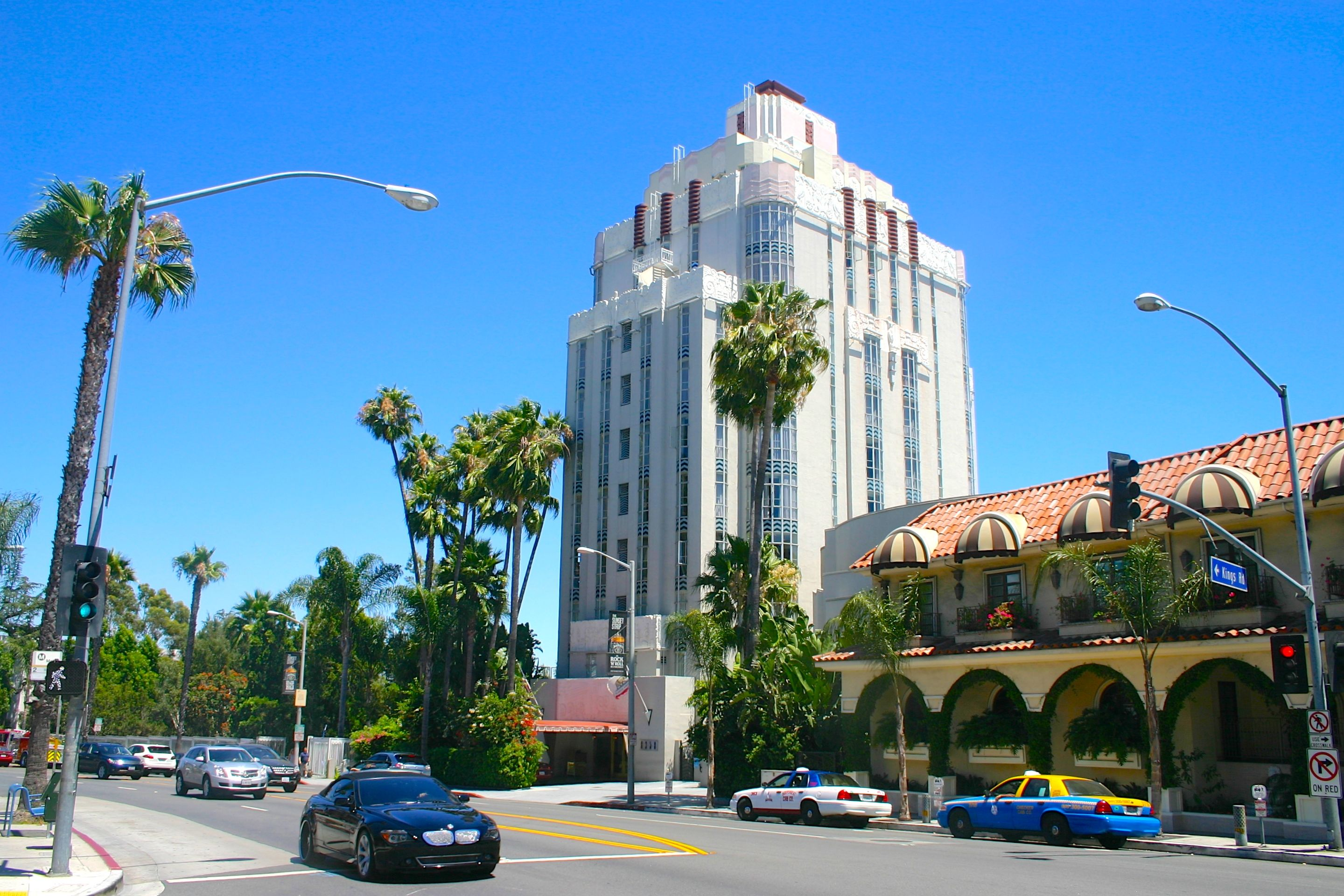
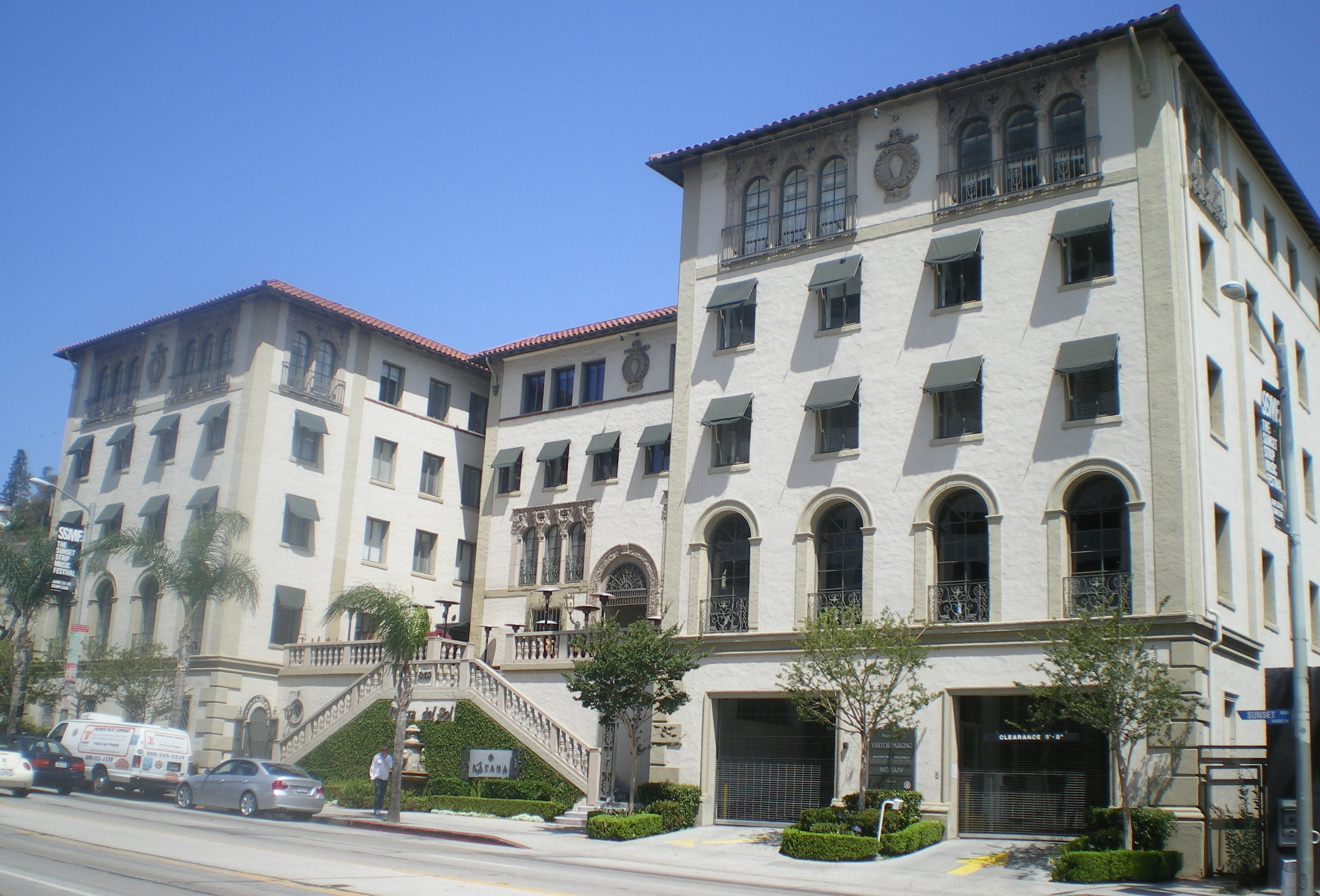
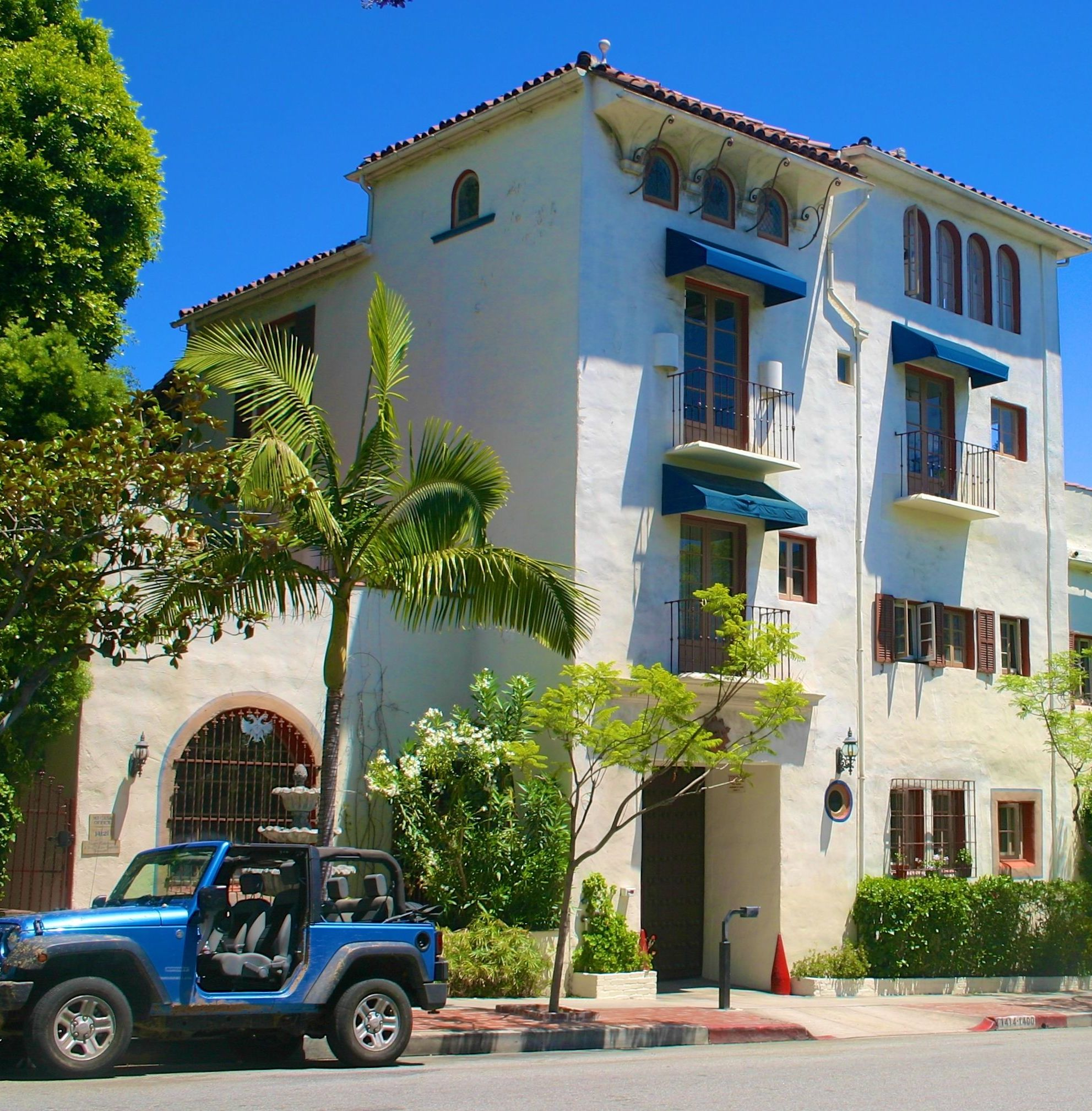
- Sunset Tower on Sunset Strip Hacienda Arms Apartments The Ronda Apartments

- Flag Seal
- Nickname: WeHo
- Motto: "The Creative City"
- Anthem: Go Go
- Location in Los Angeles County, California
- Coordinates: 34°5′16.73″N 118°22′15.49″W
- Country: United States
- State: California
- County: Los Angeles County, California
- Incorporated: November 29, 1984
- Named for: Location west of Hollywood

Government
  - Type: City Council/City Manager
  - Mayor: John Heilman
  - Mayor Pro Tem: Danny Hang
  - Councilmembers: Chelsea Lee Byers; John M. Erickson; Lauren Meister
  - City manager: Jackie Rocco

Area
  - City: 1.89 sq mi (4.89 km^{2})
  - Land: 1.89 sq mi (4.89 km^{2})
  - Water: 0 sq mi (0.00 km^{2}) 0%
- Elevation: 282 ft (86 m)

Population (2020)
  - City: 35,757
  - Density: 18,900/sq mi (7,310/km^{2})
- Time zone: UTC−8 (Pacific)
  - Summer (DST): UTC−7 (PDT)
- ZIP codes: 90038, 90046, 90048, 90069
- Area codes: 310/424, 213/323
- FIPS code: 06-84410
- GNIS feature IDs: 1652810, 2412221
- Website: weho.org

West Hollywood is a city in Los Angeles County, California, United States. Incorporated in 1984, it is home to the Sunset Strip, and located between the cities of Los Angeles and Beverly Hills. As of the 2020 U.S. census, its population was 35,757. Despite its name, West Hollywood has never been part of Hollywood or the City of Los Angeles.

== History ==
The land that is now West Hollywood lies within the traditional territory of the Tongva, who inhabited the Los Angeles Basin for centuries before European contact. Spanish colonization of Alta California began in the late eighteenth century; the Portolá expedition of 1769–1770, an overland Spanish reconnaissance from San Diego to Monterey led by Gaspar de Portolá, passed through the Los Angeles Basin in August 1769. Near what would later become West Hollywood, the party collected pitch (Spanish brea) from natural tar seeps, which they used to waterproof gear. The Spanish mission system that followed reclassified the Tongva as "Gabrielinos" after the Mission San Gabriel Arcángel, and by 1771 introduced European diseases had severely reduced the indigenous population. Here they collected pitch (brea in Spanish) from tar pits which they used to waterproof their belongings and to say Mass. The Gabrielinos are believed to have burned the pitch for fuel.

By 1780, what became the "Sunset Strip" was the major connecting road for El Pueblo de Los Angeles, and all ranches westward to the Pacific Ocean. This land passed through the hands of various owners during the next one hundred years, and it was called names such as "La Brea" and "Plummer" that are listed in historical records. Most of this area was part of the Rancho La Brea, and eventually it came to be owned by the Hancock family.

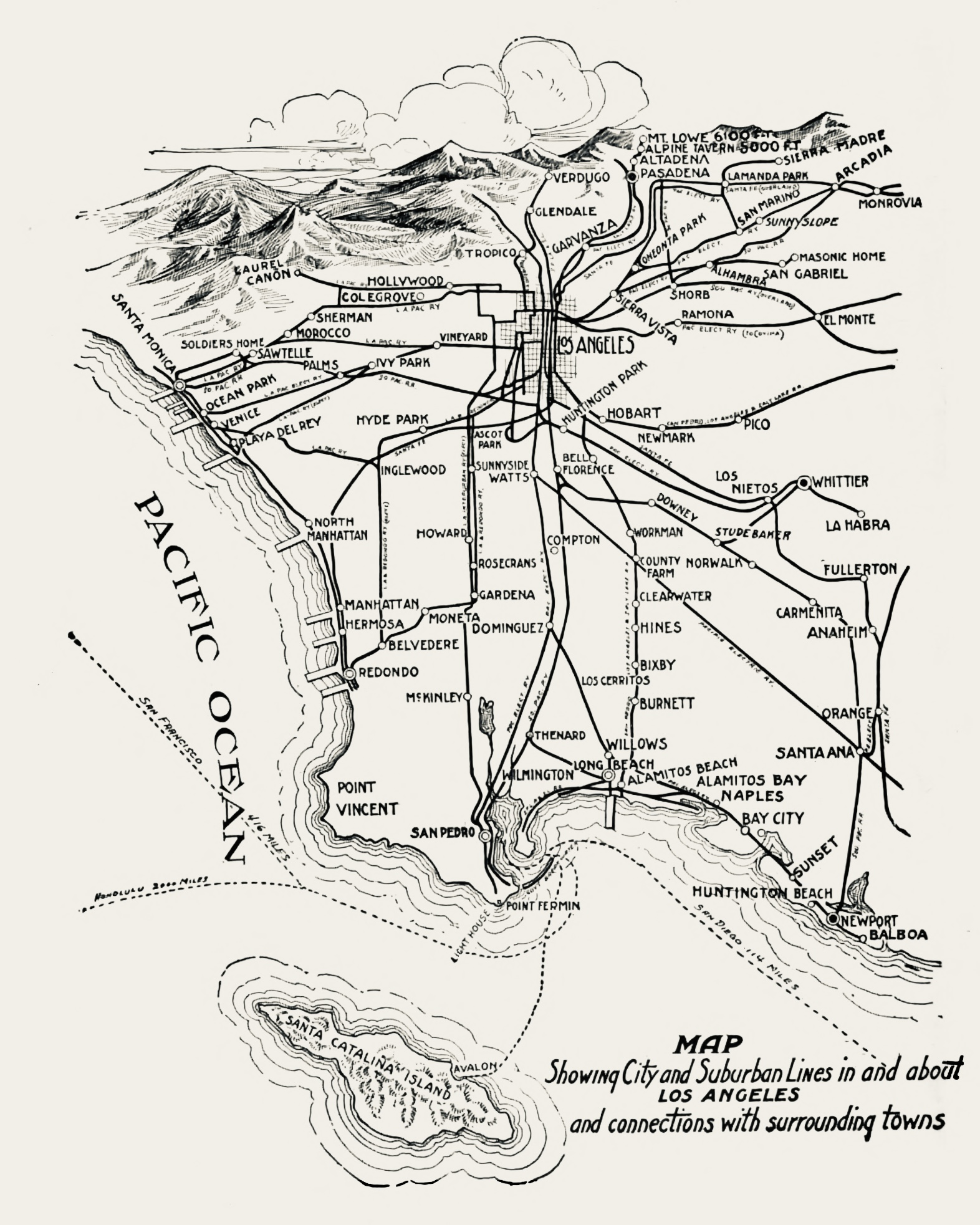
Sherman railway station, pictured on a 1912 Los Angeles map

During the final years of the nineteenth century, the first large land reconstruction of the town of "Sherman" significantly accelerated the development of the region. In what would later become West Hollywood—the town of "Sherman"—was established by Moses Sherman and his partners of the Los Angeles Pacific Railroad, an interurban railroad line which later became part of the Pacific Electric Railway system. Sherman became the location of the railroad's main shops, railroad yards, and "car barns". Many working-class employees of the railroad settled in this town. It was during this time that the city began to earn its reputation as a loosely regulated, liquor-friendly (during Prohibition) place for eccentric people wary of government interference. Despite several annexation attempts, the town elected not to become part of the City of Los Angeles. In 1925 Sherman adopted "West Hollywood," a moniker pioneered earlier in the decade by the West Hollywood Realty Board as its informal name, though it remained under the governance of Los Angeles County.

For many decades, the area that is now the City of West Hollywood was an unincorporated area in the midst of Los Angeles. Because gambling was illegal in the city of Los Angeles, but still legal in Los Angeles County, the 1920s saw the proliferation of many casinos, night clubs, etc., along Sunset Boulevard (which starts near downtown Los Angeles and runs westward). These businesses were immune from the sometimes heavy-handed law enforcement of the L.A. Police Department.

Some people connected with movie-making were attracted to this less-restricted area of the County, and a number of architecturally distinctive apartment buildings and hotels were built. Many interior designers, decorators and "to the trade" furnishing showrooms located in West Hollywood date back to the middle of the century.

Eventually, the area and its extravagant nightclubs fell out of favor. The Sunset Strip and its restaurants, saloons, and nightclubs continued to be an attraction for out-of-town tourists. During the late 1960s, the Sunset Strip was transformed again during the hippie movement which brought a thriving music publishing industry coupled with the "hippie" culture. Young people from all over the country flocked to West Hollywood.

After the dissolution of the Soviet Union, thousands of Russian Jews immigrated to the city. A majority of the 5,000 to 6,000 Russian Jews settled in two major immigration waves, 1978–79 and 1988–92. Other than New York, West Hollywood's Russian-speaking community is the most concentrated single Russian-speaking region in the United States.

The Gauntlet was a body piercing business founded by Jim Ward in West Hollywood that is considered the first business of its type in the United States and was the beginning of the body piercing industry. The Gauntlet began in 1975, with its original location in Ward's West Hollywood home, but in 1978 opened its first commercial location at 8720 Santa Monica Boulevard.

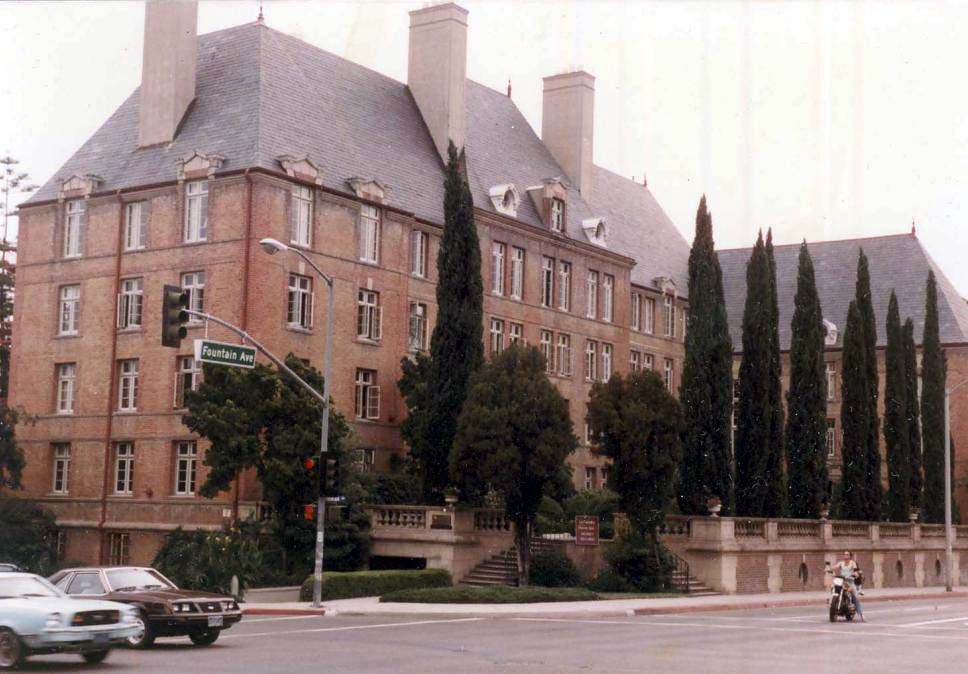
La Fontaine Building (apartments) in 1982

Due to the expiration of rent control protections in LA County, a coalition of gay men, Russian Jews, and the elderly successfully held a vote to officially incorporate the City of West Hollywood in 1984. Voters elected a city council with an openly gay majority and it immediately passed a series of rent control measures to protect its longtime citizens. West Hollywood then immediately adopted one of the strongest rent control laws in the nation.

== Geography ==
West Hollywood is bounded by the city of Beverly Hills on the west, and by neighborhoods of the city of Los Angeles: Hollywood Hills on the north, Hollywood on the east, the Fairfax District on the southeast, and Beverly Grove on the southwest. The city's irregular boundary is featured in its logo; it was largely formed from the unincorporated Los Angeles County area which had not become part of the surrounding cities.

West Hollywood benefits from a very dense, compact urban form with small lots, mixed land use, and a walkable street grid. West Hollywood has a Walkscore of 91, higher than neighboring cities in Los Angeles County. Commercial corridors include the nightlife and dining focused on the Sunset Strip, along Santa Monica Boulevard, and the Avenues of Art and Design along Robertson Boulevard, Melrose Avenue, and Beverly Boulevard.

Residential neighborhoods in West Hollywood include the Norma Triangle, West Hollywood North, West Hollywood West, West Hollywood East, and West Hollywood Heights, all of which are only a few blocks long or wide. Major intersecting streets typically provide amenities within walking distance of adjacent neighborhoods.

=== Climate ===
West Hollywood has a cool semi-arid climate (Köppen climate classification: BSk) with a pronounced Mediterranean influence in its yearly precipitation patterns.

It possesses generally sunny, year-round mild to warm weather with generally moderate humidity moderated by the Pacific Ocean, and occasional spells of high heat and very low humidity from inland Santa Ana winds. The record high temperature of 111 °F was recorded on September 26, 1963, while the record low of 24 °F was recorded on January 4, 1949. Rainfall is sparse (only 13 inches annually) and falls almost entirely during the winter months, with no precipitation for months at a time during summer months being a common occurrence. Snow is extraordinarily rare in West Hollywood, with the last accumulation occurring in 1949.

Climate data for West Hollywood, California
Month	Jan	Feb	Mar	Apr	May	Jun	Jul	Aug	Sep	Oct	Nov	Dec	Year
Record high °F (°C)	90 (32)	92 (33)	91 (33)	105 (41)	101 (38)	107 (42)	102 (39)	103 (39)	111 (44)	106 (41)	100 (38)	91 (33)	111 (44)
Mean daily maximum °F (°C)	67 (19)	69 (21)	69 (21)	73 (23)	73 (23)	77 (25)	80 (27)	81 (27)	80 (27)	77 (25)	72 (22)	68 (20)	74 (23)
Mean daily minimum °F (°C)	46 (8)	47 (8)	49 (9)	52 (11)	56 (13)	59 (15)	62 (17)	62 (17)	61 (16)	57 (14)	51 (11)	46 (8)	54 (12)
Record low °F (°C)	24 (−4)	31 (−1)	32 (0)	32 (0)	32 (0)	43 (6)	47 (8)	49 (9)	45 (7)	40 (4)	33 (1)	30 (−1)	24 (−4)
Average precipitation inches (mm)	3.19 (81)	3.05 (77)	2.66 (68)	0.58 (15)	0.26 (6.6)	0.04 (1.0)	0.02 (0.51)	0.07 (1.8)	0.08 (2.0)	0.33 (8.4)	0.94 (24)	1.90 (48)	13.12 (333)

== Demographics ==
Historical population
Census	Pop.	Note	%±
1960	28,870		—
1970	34,622		19.9%
1980	35,703		3.1%
1990	36,118		1.2%
2000	35,716		−1.1%
2010	34,399		−3.7%
2020	35,757		3.9%
U.S. Decennial Census; 1860–1870 1880-1890; 1900 1910 1920; 1930 1940 1950; 1960 1970 1980; 1990 2000 2010; 2020

West Hollywood first appeared as an unincorporated place in the 1960 U.S. census as part of the Los Angeles census county division; and then as a census-designated place in the 1980 United States census and as a city in the 1990 U.S. census

=== Racial and ethnic composition ===
West Hollywood city, California – Racial and ethnic composition Note: the US Census treats Hispanic/Latino as an ethnic category. This table excludes Latinos from the racial categories and assigns them to a separate category. Hispanics/Latinos may be of any race.
Race / Ethnicity (NH = Non-Hispanic)	Pop 1980	Pop 1990	Pop 2000	Pop 2010	Pop 2020	% 1980	% 1990	% 2000	% 2010	% 2020
White alone (NH)	31,483	30,596	28,913	26,793	25,397	88.18%	84.71%	85.41%	77.89%	71.03%
Black or African American alone (NH)	1,227	1,155	206	1,052	1,302	3.44%	3.20%	0.61%	3.06%	3.64%
Native American or Alaska Native alone (NH)	132	105	46	46	49	0.37%	0.29%	0.14%	0.13%	0.14%
Asian alone (NH)	775	1,066	2,031	1,826	2,273	2.17%	2.95%	6.00%	5.31%	6.36%
Native Hawaiian or Pacific Islander alone (NH)	775	1,066	37	30	41	2.17%	2.95%	0.11%	0.09%	0.11%
Other race alone (NH)	54	43	79	90	309	0.15%	0.12%	0.23%	0.26%	0.86%
Mixed race or Multiracial (NH)	x	x	784	949	1,889	x	x	2.32%	2.76%	5.28%
Hispanic or Latino (any race)	2,032	3,153	1,756	3,613	4,497	5.69%	8.73%	5.19%	10.50%	12.58%
Total	35,703	36,118	33,852	34,399	35,757	100.00%	100.00%	100.00%	100.00%	100.00%

=== 2020 census ===
As of the 2020 census, West Hollywood had a population of 35,757 and a population density of 18,939.1 inhabitants per square mile (7,312.4/km^{2}).

The age distribution was 4.3% under the age of 18, 4.4% aged 18 to 24, 48.9% aged 25 to 44, 26.3% aged 45 to 64, and 16.2% aged 65 or older. The median age was 40.4 years. For every 100 females, there were 127.2 males, and for every 100 females age 18 and over there were 129.0 males age 18 and over.

The census reported that 99.6% of the population lived in households, 0.4% lived in non-institutionalized group quarters, and 0.1% were institutionalized. 100.0% of residents lived in urban areas, while 0.0% lived in rural areas.

There were 23,576 households, of which 5.1% had children under the age of 18 living in them. Of all households, 16.3% were married-couple households, 9.7% were cohabiting couple households, 39.8% were households with a male householder and no spouse or partner present, and 34.1% were households with a female householder and no spouse or partner present. About 59.6% of all households were made up of individuals, and 13.3% had someone living alone who was 65 years of age or older. The average household size was 1.51. There were 5,351 families (22.7% of all households).

There were 25,821 housing units at an average density of 13,676.4 units per square mile (5,280.5 units/km^{2}). Of all housing units, 8.7% were vacant. Of occupied units, 20.0% were owner-occupied and 80.0% were occupied by renters. The homeowner vacancy rate was 2.0%, and the rental vacancy rate was 5.6%.

=== 2023 ACS estimates ===
In 2023, the US Census Bureau estimated that the median household income was $94,844, and the per capita income was $88,026. About 9.2% of families and 13.1% of the population were below the poverty line.

=== 2010 census ===
The 2010 United States census reported that West Hollywood had a population of 34,399. The population density was 18,225.6 inhabitants per square mile (7,036.9/km^{2}). The racial makeup of West Hollywood was 28,979 (84.2%) White (77.9% Non-Hispanic White), 1,115 (3.2%) African American, 103 (0.3%) Native American, 1,874 (5.4%) Asian, 34 (0.1%) Pacific Islander, 1,049 (3.0%) from other races, and 1,245 (3.6%) from two or more races. There were 3,613 residents of Hispanic or Latino ancestry, of any race (10.5%).

The census reported that 34,290 people (99.7% of the population) lived in households, 109 (0.3%) lived in non-institutionalized group quarters, and 0 (0%) were institutionalized.

There were 22,511 households, out of which 1,141 (5.1%) had children under the age of 18 living in them, 3,060 (13.6%) were opposite-sex married couples living together, 852 (3.8%) had a female householder with no husband present, 431 (1.9%) had a male householder with no wife present. There were 1,094 (4.9%) unmarried opposite-sex partnerships, and 1,321 (5.9%) same-sex married couples or partnerships. 13,434 households (59.7%) were made up of individuals, and 2,606 (11.6%) had someone living alone who was 65 years of age or older. The average household size was 1.52. There were 4,343 families (19.3% of all households); the average family size was 2.42.

There were 1,578 residents (4.6%) under the age of 18, 2,407 people (7.0%) aged 18 to 24, 16,228 (47.2%) aged 25 to 44, 9,061 (26.3%) aged 45 to 64, and 5,125 (14.9%) who were 65 years of age or older. The median age was 40.4 years. For every 100 females, there were 128.4 males. For every 100 females aged 18 and over, there were 129.9 males.

There were 24,588 housing units at an average density of 13,027.4 units per square mile (5,029.9 units/km^{2}), of which 4,976 (22.1%) were owner-occupied, and 17,535 (77.9%) were occupied by renters. The homeowner vacancy rate was 3.6%; the rental vacancy rate was 5.9%. 7,874 people (22.9% of the population) lived in owner-occupied housing units and 26,416 people (76.8%) lived in rental housing units.

=== 2009–2013 estimates ===
During 2009–2013, West Hollywood had a median household income of $52,649, with 15.8% of the population living below the federal poverty line.

=== Community studies ===
As of 2019, gay men were 33% of the city's population; a 2013 survey had estimated the gay male population at 39%.

== Economy ==
=== Top employers ===
According to the City's 2021 Comprehensive Annual Financial Report, the top employers in the city were:

No.	Employer	No. of employees
1	Los Angeles County Metropolitan Transportation Authority	559
2	Target	289
3	CityGrid Media / InterActive Corp	288
4	City of West Hollywood	240
5	1 OAK	200
6	Laz Parking	200
7	Pavilions	180
8	Argyle Hotel	165
9	Andaz West Hollywood	161
10	Whole Foods Market	153

=== Cannabis ===
Under the legalization of the sale and distribution of cannabis, the city plans to issue 40 licenses to either operate a dispensary, consumption lounge or delivery service. Eight licenses are planned in each of the following categories:

- Adult-use retail business licenses
- Consumption lounge (smoking, vaping, edibles) business licenses
- Consumption lounge (edibles only) business licenses
- Medical-use dispensary business licenses
- Business licenses for cannabis delivery services located in West Hollywood

State law does not allow local governments to regulate adults in growing, using, or transporting marijuana for personal use but commercial activities, such as growing, testing, and selling cannabis within their jurisdiction may be regulated by each city by licensing none or only some of these activities. West Hollywood's first four dispensaries, Alternative Herbal Health Services, Los Angeles Patients and Caregivers Group, Zen Healing and MedMen WeHo, were granted temporary extensions in June 2019 to operate as retail businesses through the remainder of the year.

In July 2019, the West Hollywood Business License Commission approved a cannabis consumption license for Lowell Herb Co. In September 2019, Lowell Farms: A Cannabis Cafe opened with a menu of cannabis for consumption, THC-infused drinks and meals for cannabis-enhanced sense of taste and smell. It is the first cannabis cafe in the United States and will include the expertise of cannabis sommeliers, known as "budtenders" on site.

On August 20, 2020, the Original Cannabis Cafe (previously known as The Lowell Cafe in West Hollywood) became America's first restaurant allowed to serve legal marijuana to open in California. It became one of eight establishments granted a cannabis consumption license in West Hollywood. There were reportedly over 300 applicants, and the Original Cannabis Cafe states it was granted the first license.

== Arts and culture ==
Christopher Street West is an LGBTQ pride parade and festival that was first held in June 1970 in Hollywood to commemorate the first anniversary of the Stonewall Riots in Manhattan. After incorporation, the event moved to West Hollywood for many years and was typically held the second weekend in June until it relocated back to the City of Los Angeles in 2022.

The West Hollywood Halloween Carnaval is an event that takes place annually on October 31. Once a larger event, participation has dwindled dramatically since the COVID-19 pandemic, further compounded by budgetary cuts from the city of West Hollywood, the event's sponsor.

The annual One City One Pride event was an LGBTQ Arts Festival held over a 40-day period from Harvey Milk Day, May 22 through the end of Pride Month, June 30. In 2023, the "One City One Pride LGBTQ Arts Festival" became the "WeHo Pride Arts Festival" to align with the new WeHo Pride brand. In 2024, the WeHo Pride Arts Festival downshifted from 40-days of programming to a unified weekend of programming from June 14 through June 16.

Since 1993, the City of West Hollywood and its LGBTQ+ Advisory Board have presented over 173 Rainbow Key Awards to those who have made outstanding contributions to West Hollywood’s LGBTQ+ community. These contributions, by an individual or a group, maybe in many forms, including the arts, community action, humanitarian action, sports, medicine, armed services, leadership potential, benefit to the global LGBTQ+ community, or other ways. Past honorees have included Bruce Vilanch, Abbe Land, Kenneth Hahn, Tom of Finland, Sheila Kuehl, David Cooley, Chaz Bono, West Hollywood Community Housing Corporation, Project Angel Food, Jazzmun, and Nahshon Dion.

The West Hollywood Book Fair has been held in the fall since 2001. Past participants have included Andrew McCarthy, Deepak Chopra, and Rocco DiSpirito.

Frontrunners LGBT Pride Run is a 5 km/10 km run/walk held on the Sunday morning of LGBT Pride.

The City of West Hollywood sponsors pet appreciation days including walks throughout the year, which have in the past featured pet psychics and dog activities. During Halloween, the week before October 31, animals can participate in a costume contest in West Hollywood Park. West Hollywood is near Runyon Canyon Park's hiking trail and dog park in Hollywood.

The Elton John AIDS Foundation Academy Awards Party has traditionally been held at the Pacific Design Center. It is a multimillion-dollar fundraiser for the foundation.

West Hollywood has many ongoing programs to celebrate the arts and culture of the city. The literary community is acknowledged with the year-round author series WeHo Reads, featuring new and noteworthy authors at the West Hollywood Library with a full-day literary event each fall. An annual PowPow is presented by AIDS Project Los Angeles Red Circle Project and the City of West Hollywood. This event, held at Plummer Park promotes HIV awareness and prevention among the Native communities and features dance, music, food, and educational resources.

West Hollywood inaugurated the first City Poet, Steven Reigns, during the regular City Council meeting on October 6, 2014.

Pickle Drag Queen became West Hollywood's first drag laureate on International Drag Day, July 16, 2023.

=== LGBTQ community ===
West Hollywood is the epicenter of LGBT culture in Los Angeles County. Approximately 40% of the population in the city identifies as lesbian, gay, bisexual or transgender. West Hollywood has become one of the world's top gay vacation spots for LGBTQ travelers and is at the center of Southern California gay culture, including nightlife, spas, shopping, and dining.

The city maintains expansive historical records of the LGBTQ community. The West Hollywood Library has an extensive collection of LGBTQ records, literature, and history, including the June L. Mazer Lesbian Archives, and the Ron Shipton HIV Information Center. According to an LA Times article, the ONE Archives Gallery and Museum is the first museum in Southern California exclusively dedicated to gay history.

In 2018, America's first city-wide Bi Pride event was held in West Hollywood.

== Government ==
=== Local ===
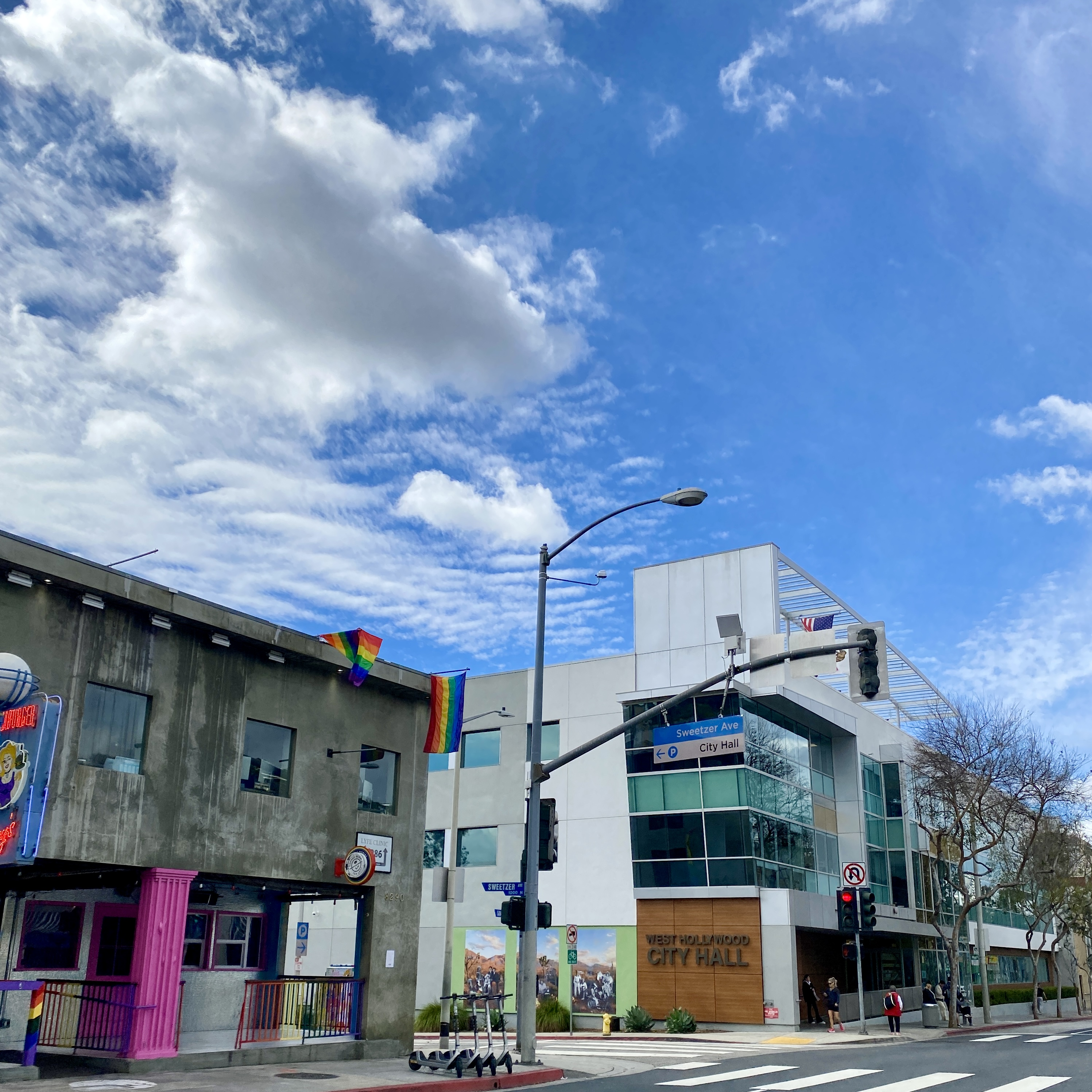
West Hollywood City Hall (2024)

The city government is headed by a five-member city council who "serve for a term of four (4) years and are elected at large. The City Councilmembers select one of their members to serve as Mayor and this office rotates among the members of Council on their yearly reorganization which occurs in April." As of August 2026, the council members are John Heilman (mayor), Danny Hang (vice mayor), Chelsea Lee Byers, John M. Erickson, and Lauren Meister.

West Hollywood was the first city in the country to have a city council with a majority of gay members.

With West Hollywood being one of the most prominent gay-friendly cities in the United States, Proposition 8 had a higher rate of rejection than it did in any other city in Los Angeles County: 86% of the city voted against the amendment, which restricted marriage to heterosexual couples.

=== State and federal representation ===
In the California State Legislature, West Hollywood is in the 24th senatorial district, represented by Democrat Ben Allen, and in the 51st Assembly district, represented by Democrat Rick Zbur.

On December 20, 2021, the California Citizens Redistricting Commission voted 14-0 in favor of a new state Assembly and Senate district maps and delivered those maps to the secretary of state on December 27, 2021. These maps take effect for California's 2022 state legislative elections, changing West Hollywood's Assembly District to AD 51 and Senate District to SD 24.

In the United States House of Representatives, West Hollywood is in California's 30th congressional district, represented by Democrat Laura Friedman.

== Education ==
=== Primary and secondary schools ===
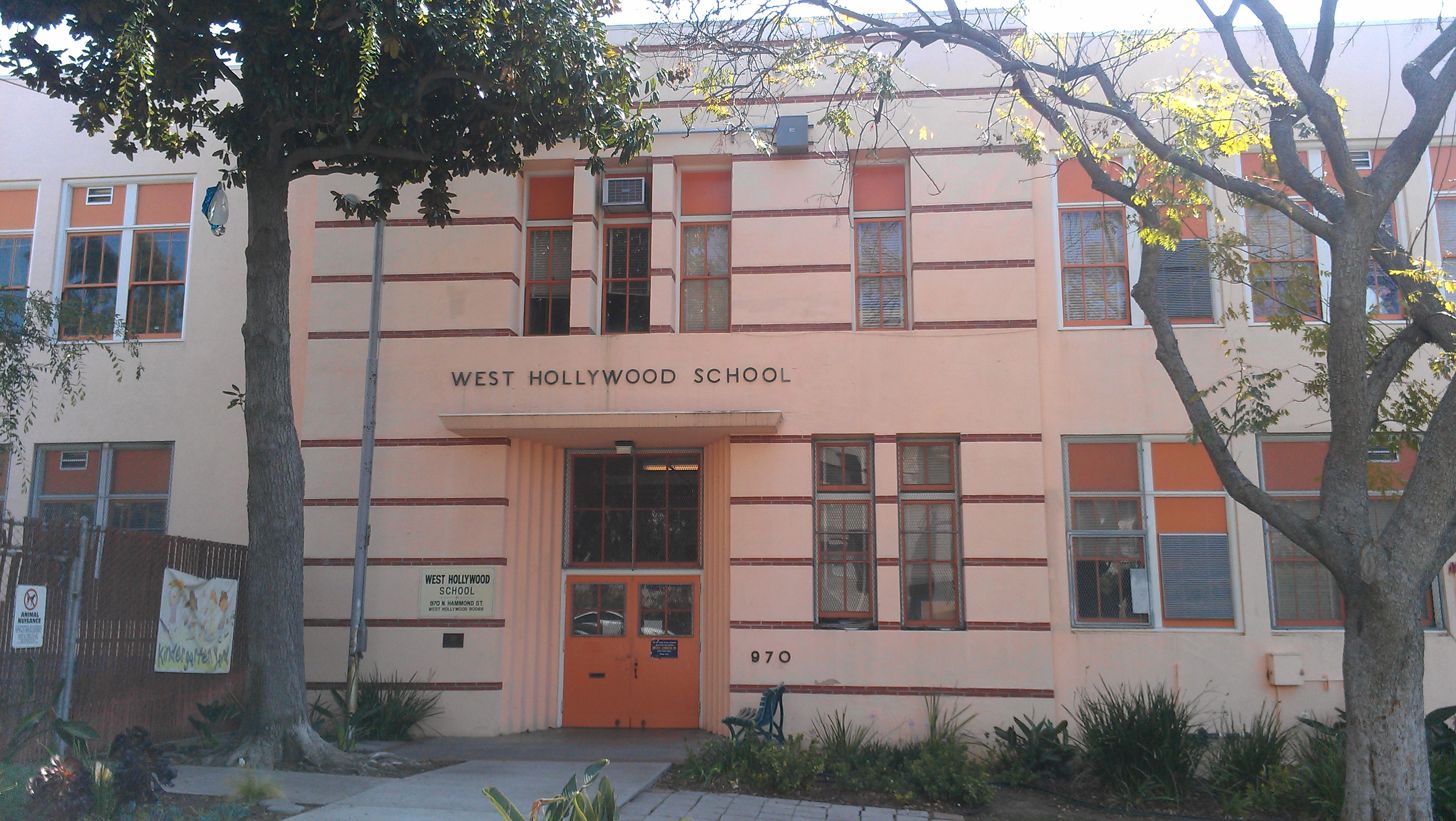
West Hollywood Elementary School

All of West Hollywood is served by the Los Angeles Unified School District. The area is within Board District 4.

Elementary schools that serve sections of West Hollywood include:

- West Hollywood Elementary School K–6
- Rosewood Avenue Elementary School K–5
- Laurel Elementary School K–8
- Melrose Elementary School K–6
- Gardner Street Elementary School K–5

(Some areas jointly zoned to Rosewood and West Hollywood)

Most of West Hollywood is zoned to Bancroft Middle School. Some portions in the south are zoned to John Burroughs Middle School. Students living in the Los Angeles area known as Beverly Hills Post Office, usually attend West Hollywood Elementary but then go to Emerson Middle School.

In 2005 the zoned high school was Fairfax High School.

Private Schools in West Hollywood:

- West Hollywood College Preparatory School (WHCP) K–12
- The Center for Early Education
- Pacific Hills School

All of West Hollywood is zoned to Fairfax High School; some areas are jointly zoned to Fairfax High School and Hollywood High School.

== Media ==
West Hollywood is served by a mix of hyperlocal news outlets, LGBT press and government media, and has been a subject and setting for the Los Angeles-area entertainment press throughout its history as an unincorporated community and as an incorporated city.

The Los Angeles Blade, a weekly LGBT newspaper and sister publication of the Washington Blade, has covered West Hollywood since its launch in 2017. The area was historically covered by Frontiers, an LGBT magazine published in Los Angeles from 1981 until it ceased print publication in 2016, and by The Advocate, which was headquartered in the region for much of its history.

Hyperlocal news coverage of the city is provided by WEHOville and WeHo Times, both online publications focused on West Hollywood civic affairs, business, real estate and LGBT community news. The city government also operates WeHoTV, a public-access cable channel and streaming service that broadcasts City Council meetings and city-produced programming. Coverage of West Hollywood as part of a broader neighborhood beat is provided by the Beverly Press and Park Labrea News, which report on West Hollywood alongside the Fairfax, Beverly Hills and Miracle Mile areas.

== Infrastructure ==
=== Transportation ===
Traffic congestion, public transport and parking are critical issues in the city due to its location between access to areas such as Greater Hollywood to the east and the San Fernando Valley to the north and the area of the Los Angeles West Side, with the Hollywood Hills creating a natural impediment to the north. Santa Monica Boulevard and Sunset Boulevard are critical east-west arteries in the metropolitan area, and Laurel Canyon Boulevard is a popular shortcut through the hills. Nearly 600 employees and 260 buses in the District 7 fleet of the LACMTA are based in a large facility on prime real estate near San Vicente Boulevard and Santa Monica Boulevard. The K Line extension to the Hollywood Bowl and the Hollywood/Highland station is planned to pass through West Hollywood, along Santa Monica Boulevard.

==== The PickUp ====
In August 2013, the City of West Hollywood launched a free Friday and Saturday night shuttle, the PickUp, connecting the eastern and western parts of the city. The goal of The PickUp is to provide an alternative to the automobile and bring an energetic and playful transit option to one of West Hollywood's busiest nighttime districts. The Public Relations Society of America Los Angeles Chapter (PRSA-LA) has recognized the City of West Hollywood with a PRism Award of Excellence in the category of New Product/Service Launch for the city's kick-off campaign for the PickUp.

==== The Sunset Trip shuttle service ====
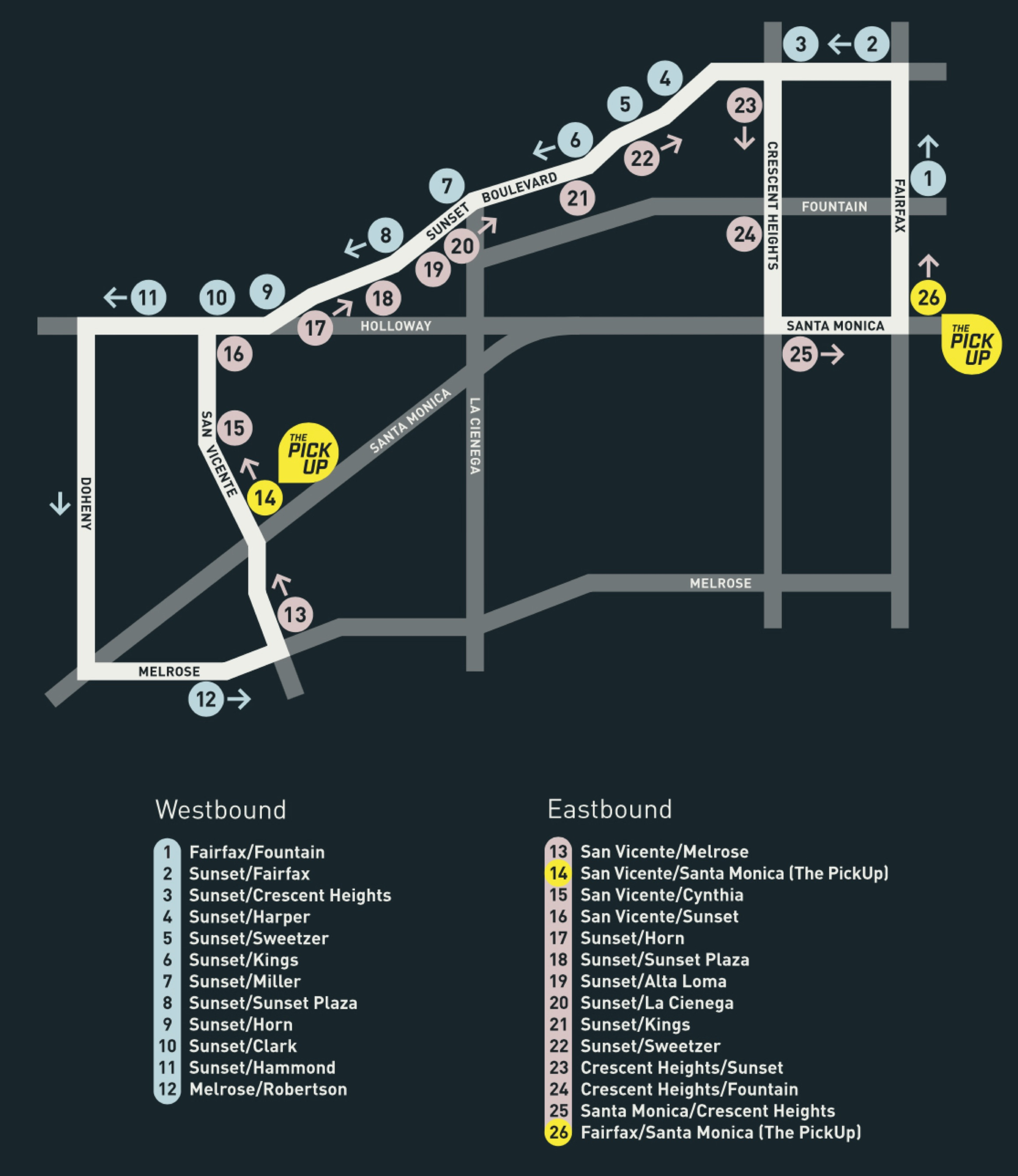
Sunset Trip route map

In June 2018, the City of West Hollywood launched a new free shuttle service called The Sunset Trip. This service focuses on shuttling riders on Sunset Boulevard, but also crosses the PickUp shuttle route to allow transfers.

=== Public health and safety ===
The Los Angeles County Sheriff's Department operates the West Hollywood Station.

The Los Angeles County Department of Health Services operates the Hollywood-Wilshire Health Center in Hollywood, serving West Hollywood.

Fire protection in West Hollywood is provided by the Los Angeles County Fire Department. LACoFD operates Station 7, the battalion headquarters, and Station 8, both in West Hollywood, as a part of Battalion 1.

Emergency Medical Services are provided by LACoFD and McCormick Ambulance.

=== Social services ===
West Hollywood, with a gay male population of about 39%, has been disproportionately affected by the HIV/AIDS epidemic which has ravaged its gay male population since the early 1980s. The city funds or subsidizes an array of services for those living with HIV or AIDS. The AIDS Healthcare Foundation parks a Mobile HIV/STD testing van outside of the city's busiest nightclubs on Friday and Saturday nights, and again on Sunday afternoons. This outreach attempts to intervene with those young people most at-risk for HIV infection. Project Angel Food receives city funding to deliver hundreds of fresh lunches and dinners daily which are prepared under the supervision of a registered dietitian who tailors the meals to meet individual client's nutritional needs. AIDS Project Los Angeles (APLA) is a national leader for AIDS policy and advocacy issues and provides assistance to clients navigating the maze of available public benefits. APLA also provides free dental, psychotherapy and pharmaceutical services. Aid for AIDS provides direct financial support by assisting clients with rent, utility and pharmacy expenses. The city also subsidizes agencies that help clients train for a return to the workforce. To further support vulnerable residents, West Hollywood's Rent Stabilization Ordinance explicitly permits tenants living with HIV/AIDS, as well as older adults and individuals with disabilities, to have up to two pets (weighing under 35 pounds) in their home regardless of a landlord's standard lease specifications.

To support a growing population of children, the municipality partners with the USDA and local schools to fund youth programs. Initiatives like "Healthy Start West Hollywood," run through the city's Social Services division, introduce pre-kindergarten through high school-age kids to the benefits of good nutrition through activities such as collective vegetable gardens and yoga.

The special needs of senior citizens and residents with disabilities are addressed through a variety of programs. City funding and subsidies support agencies such as Jewish Family Services and the Los Angeles LGBT Center to offer adult day care, roommate matching services, and nutritious meals. The West Hollywood Senior Center provides recreational programs, excursions, and socializing as well as counseling and case management.

For residents who do not have adequate insurance, local subsidies help maintain the Saban Community Clinic (formerly the LA Free Clinic) and the Los Angeles LGBT Center. Patients can access free or low-cost medical, dental, legal, and mental health services between these two sites.

Additionally, the city's Public Safety Division publishes guides on sexual assault prevention, nightclub safety, and how to access rape services.

=== Public library ===
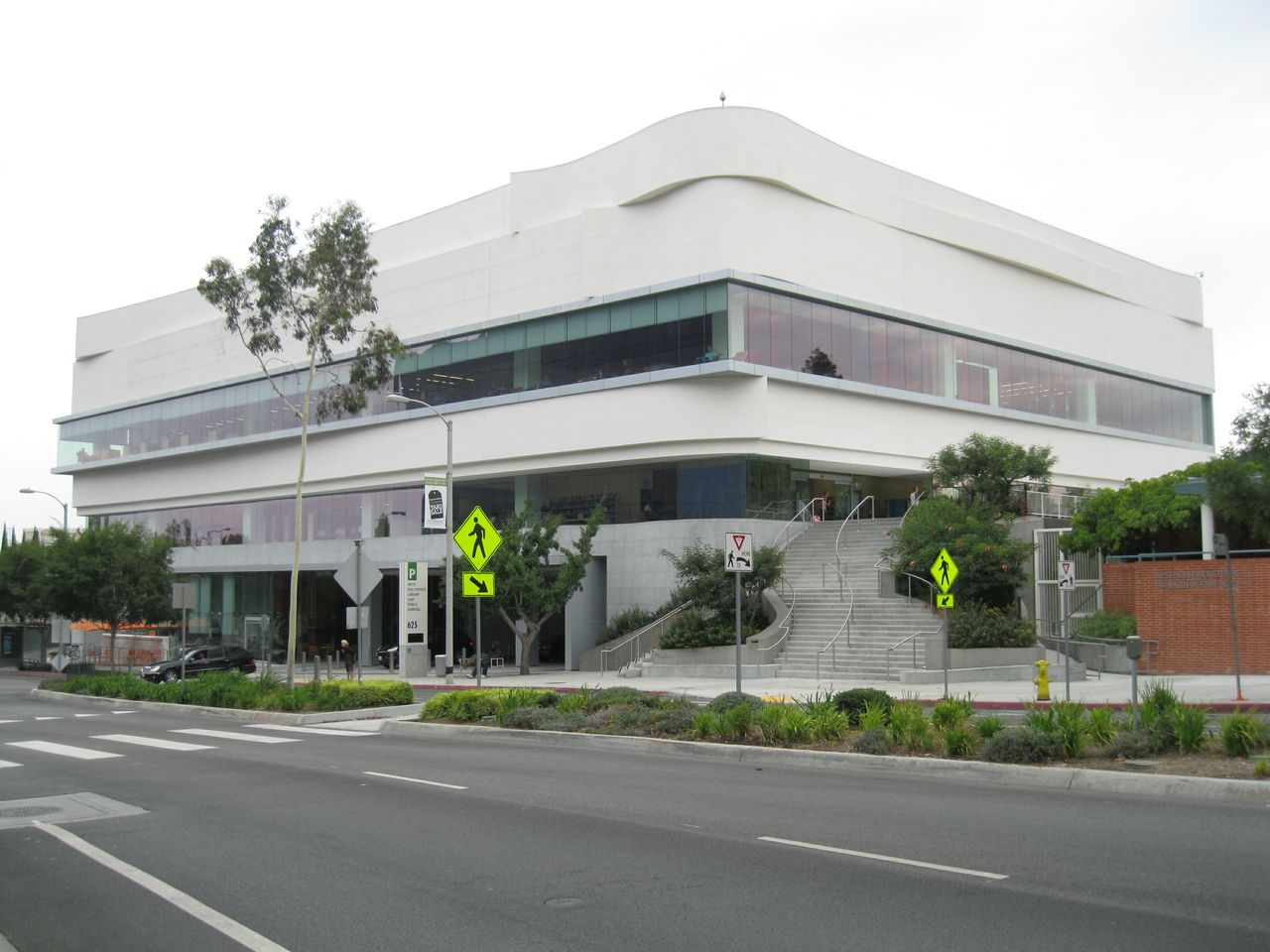
The West Hollywood Library viewed from across the street in front of the Pacific Design Center.

County of Los Angeles Public Library operates the West Hollywood Library at 625 North San Vicente Boulevard.

Until early September 2011, the library was based at 715 North San Vicente Boulevard in a building designed by architect Edward H. Fickett. On September 6, 2011, the City demolished that building, which aroused controversy among some community members, including the architect's wife.

The current library building officially opened to the public on October 1, 2011. The building, which was designed by architects Steve Johnson and James Favaro, received a favorable review in the Los Angeles Times that ended by calling it "...a tremendously encouraging achievement". Exterior surfaces of the library building and adjacent parking structure are decorated with murals by Shepard Fairey, Kenny Scharf and Marquis Lewis (aka Retna), and the interior incorporates design work by Fairey and David Wiseman.

== Notable people ==
The issue of paparazzi chasing celebrities is raised regularly and the city participates in meetings with other nearby municipalities such as Beverly Hills and Los Angeles to discuss the problem and possible actions to better control the activity. The epicenter of the Thirty Mile Zone lies just blocks to the south of the city, and is the basis for the name of TMZ on TV, a paparazzi footage-based program. TMZ moved their operations from Sunset and Crescent Heights Boulevards to Los Angeles.

On May 28, 2018, Mayor John Duran announced that Stormy Daniels would receive the "Key to the City" alongside her attorney, Michael Avenatti. “In these politically tumultuous times, Stormy Daniels has proven herself to be a profile in courage by speaking truth to power even under threats to her safety and extreme intimidation from the current Administration”, said the mayor.

Actress Drew Barrymore grew up on Poinsettia Place until the age of 7, when she moved to Sherman Oaks; she moved back to West Hollywood at the age of 14. Actor Amir Talai also resides in West Hollywood.

=== Mayors of West Hollywood ===
- Valerie Terrigno (1984–1985)
- John Heilman (1985–1986)
- Stephen Shulte (1986–1987)
- Alan Viterbi (1987–1988)
- Helen Albert (1988–1989)
- Abbe Land (1989–1990)
- John Heilman (1990–1991)
- Paul Koretz (1991–1992)
- Babette Lang (1992–1993)
- Sal Guarriello (1993–1994)
- Abbe Land (1994–1995)
- John Heilman (1995–1996)
- Paul Koretz (1996–1997)
- Sal Guarriello (1997–1998)
- Steve Martin (1998–1999)
- John Heilman (1999–2000)
- Jeff Prang (2000–2001)
- John Heilman (2001–2002)
- Sal Guarriello (2002–2003)
- Jeff Prang (2003–2004)
- John Duran (2004–2005)
- Abbe Land (2005–2006)
- John Heilman (2006–2007)
- John Duran (2007–2008)
- Jeff Prang (2008–2009)
- Abbe Land (2009–2010)
- John Heilman (2010–2011)
- John Duran (2011–2012)
- Jeff Prang (2012–2013)
- Abbe Land (2013–2014)
- John D'Amico (2014–2015)
- Lindsey P. Horvath (2015–2016)
- Lauren Meister (2016–2017)
- John Heilman (2017–2018)
- John Duran (2018–2019)
- John D'Amico (2019–2020)
- Lindsey P. Horvath (2020–2021)
- Lauren Meister (2021–2023)
- Sepi Shyne (2023–2024)
- John M. Erickson (2024–2025)
- Chelsea Byers (2025-current)

== Landmarks and distinctive places ==
Alta Loma Road is home to the Sunset Marquis Hotel with its Whisky Bar. Alta Loma Road was one of the main locations for the film Perfect. Actor Sal Mineo lived on Holloway Drive in the 1970s; he was murdered in his carport just around the corner from Alta Loma.

The western stretch of Melrose Avenue between Fairfax Avenue and Doheny Drive, marketed by the city as the "Avenues of Art and Design," concentrates interior-design showrooms, antique dealers and clothing boutiques along its length; the western end, adjacent to the Pacific Design Center, is particularly associated with high-end furniture and design.

The area around Fountain Avenue, Harper Avenue and Havenhurst Drive contains a high concentration of 1920s Spanish Revival and Art Deco apartment buildings, many by Leland Bryant. The Sunset Tower at 8358 Sunset Boulevard, one of Bryant's best-known works, was home over the years to residents including Frank Sinatra, Errol Flynn, John Wayne and Howard Hughes.

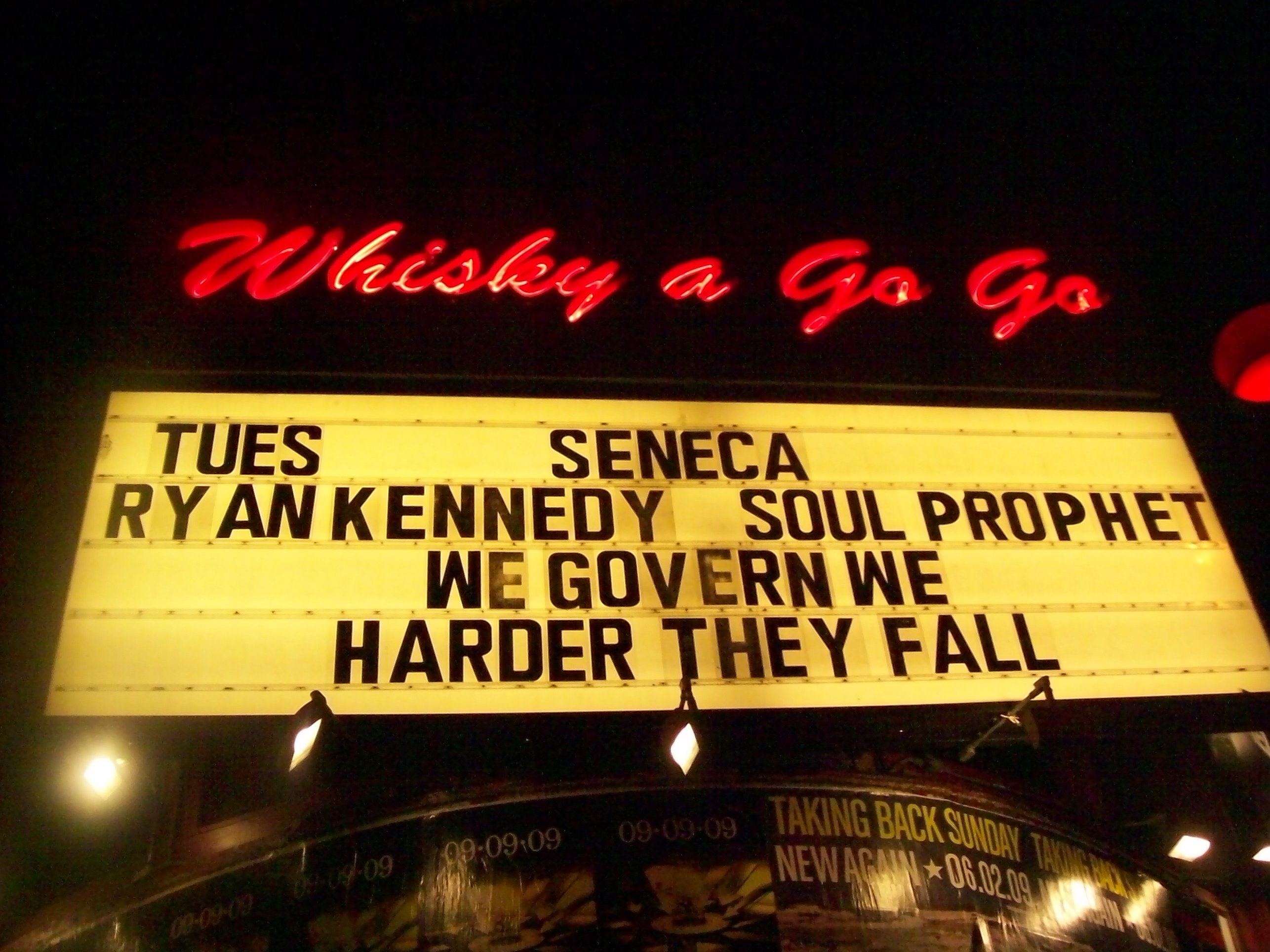
Whisky a Go Go on the Sunset Strip

Notable businesses and attractions in West Hollywood include:

- The Sunset Strip
- Hotels including the Chateau Marmont, Andaz West Hollywood, Chamberlain West Hollywood Hotel, The Charlie, Mondrian, Montrose West Hollywood, the Sunset Marquis Hotel and the Standard
- The Pacific Design Center
- Architecture including the Schindler House by Rudolf Schindler, 9200 Sunset by Charles Luckman, the Coronet Building (Piazza del Sol), and The MAK Center for Art and Architecture
- Music venues including the Whisky a Go Go, The Troubadour, The Roxy Theatre and Viper Room (the former House of Blues location closed in 2015)
- Westlake Recording Studios, where Michael Jackson recorded Thriller (1982) and Bad (1987)
- Celebrity hangouts including Soho House, the Formosa Cafe (reopened 2019), the Rainbow Bar and Grill and The Abbey Food & Bar
- Film, television and music production including Samuel Goldwyn Studio (now The Lot), which hosts the Oprah Winfrey Network, Funny or Die and Showtime
- Several parks including the historic Plummer Park
- The Comedy Store
- Sierra Towers
- Saint Victor Catholic Church
- The West Hollywood Gateway Project shopping center

== Controversies ==
=== Discrimination issues ===
Sometime in the 1940s, a sign appeared over the bar at Barney's Beanery that said "FAGOTS [sic] – STAY OUT." The message so offended locals that Life magazine did an article on opposition to the sign in 1964, which included a photograph of the owner steadfastly holding on to it. The owner died in 1968, and efforts continued to have the sign removed. The Gay Liberation Front organized a zap of the restaurant on February 7, 1970, to push for its removal. The sign disappeared that day. The sign was put up and taken down several times over the next 14 years, but the practice ended in December 1984, days after the city voted itself into existence. The then-mayor, Valerie Terrigno, the entire city council and gay-rights activists marched into Barney's and relieved the wall of the sign. It was held by Morris Kight for many years and now rests in the ONE National Gay & Lesbian Archives.

Jewel-Thais Williams, who owned the bar Jewel's Catch One, originally opened the bar in 1973 because she experienced discrimination in both heterosexual bars and gay bars because she was both black and a woman.

A resident drew national attention during the 2008 presidential election by including a Sarah Palin mannequin hung in effigy in a Halloween display. The home's decorations also featured a doll of John McCain surrounded by decorative flames in the chimney. Residents identified the display as a hate crime, but the Los Angeles County Sheriff's Department stated the display did not violate any laws.

In March 2006, agents from Immigration and Customs Enforcement and the U.S. Secret Service seized 250 fake denomination notes, each bearing a denomination of $1 billion, from a West Hollywood apartment.

=== Celebrity incidents ===
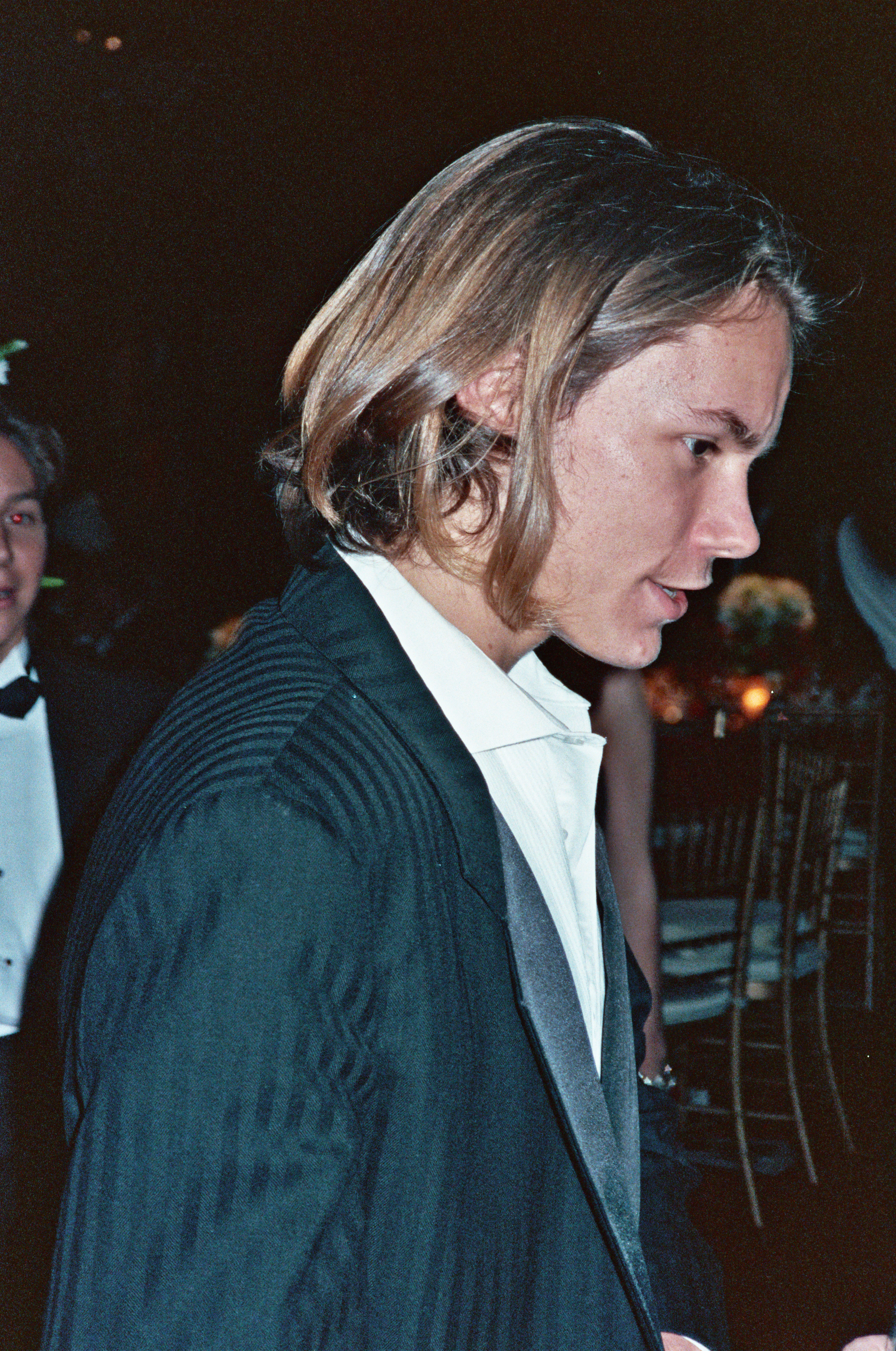
River Phoenix

On Halloween night in 1993, actor River Phoenix died at age 23 of a drug overdose at The Viper Room, a club that was opened that year and was partly owned by actor Johnny Depp until 2004.

On January 8, 2006, New Zealand film director Lee Tamahori, dressed as a woman, was arrested for allegedly offering an undercover police officer oral sex on the corner of Santa Monica Boulevard and Lodi Place. He was convicted only of criminal trespass, having pleaded no contest in exchange for other charges being dropped.

On November 17, 2006, during a performance at the Laugh Factory, a cell phone video captured Michael Richards shouting "Shut up" to a heckler in the audience, followed by repeated shouts of "He's a nigger!" to the rest of the audience (using the word six times altogether), and also making a reference to lynching.

== Legislation ==
West Hollywood has inclusionary zoning laws governing development. The city established the Affordable Housing Trust Fund in 1986 requiring developers to either provide affordable housing in new projects or pay a fee in-lieu to the city which it directs towards other affordable housing projects.

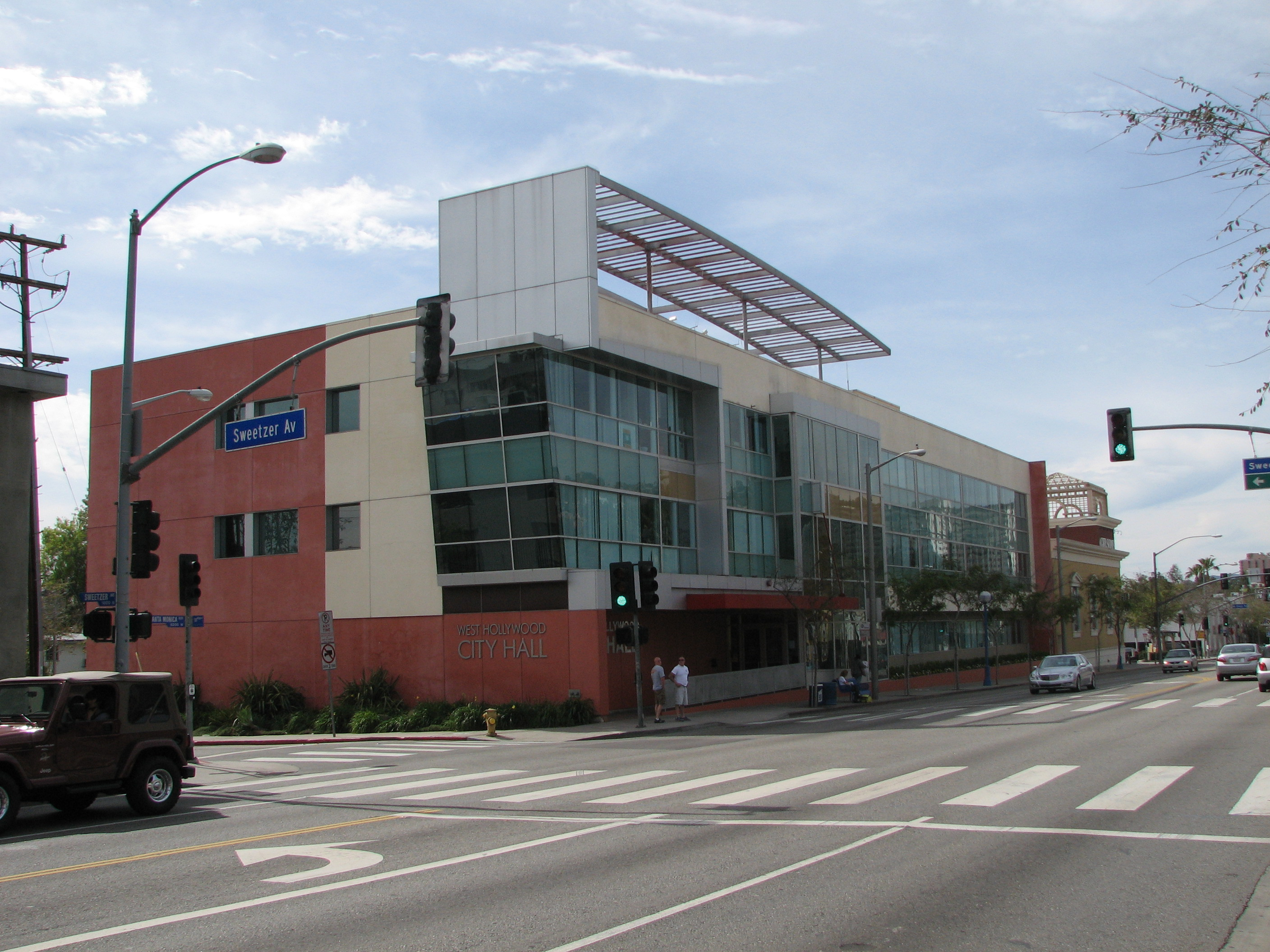
West Hollywood City Hall on Santa Monica Boulevard

In 1993 the West Hollywood City Council voted for West Hollywood to become the first official pro-choice city in America.

In 2006, the City Council passed a medicinal marijuana resolution, by a vote of 4–0, making it the first city in Southern California to adopt a lowest law enforcement priority law for cannabis offenses. The resolution stated, "it is not the policy of the City or its law enforcement agency to target possession of small amounts of cannabis and the consumption of non-medical cannabis in private by adults".

West Hollywood adopted one of the nation's first mandatory green building ordinances on October 1, 2007.

City legislation bans the sale of handguns, prohibits smoking in public places, and restricts the city from doing business directly or indirectly (via vendors) with any country known to violate human rights. The city has banned the use of gas-powered leaf blowers.

As of July 2023, West Hollywood has the country's highest minimum wage, at $19.08 per hour.

=== Animal rights ===
West Hollywood has been an early adopter of legislation to protect animal rights and welfare. In 1989, the city declared itself a "cruelty free zone" and banned the use of steel-jaw traps and cosmetic testing on animals. In 2001, it updated references to "pets" in city policy to "companions" and "owners" to "guardians". In 2003, the city became the first in the United States to ban the declawing of cats. In 2009, the city council passed a resolution supporting California's ban on foie gras, which it called a "product of animal torture," and distributed a copy of the resolution to all restaurants in the city that served foie gras.

In 2010, West Hollywood became the first U.S. city to prohibit the retail sale of dogs and cats, including from puppy mills. In 2011, it became the first city to ban the sale of new fur products; the ban took effect in September 2013 and was upheld following a court challenge in May 2014. In 2013, the city banned commercial displays and performances of wild and exotic animals, and in 2023 it banned the sale and use of glue traps for rodent control. In 2024, it adopted a policy requiring that city events and institutions serve plant-based foods by default and only offer animal source foods on request. Later that year, it endorsed the Plant Based Treaty to address greenhouse gas emissions from animal agriculture.

=== LGBTQ rights ===
In 1985, West Hollywood was the first city to create a same-gender domestic partnership registration for its residents, as well as to offer same-gender domestic partner benefits for city employees. West Hollywood's Domestic Partnerships are open to any two adults, regardless of gender, sexual orientation, place of residence, or length of relationship. These unions are treated on an equal basis with legal marriages with respect to city-level benefits and services.

Legislation prohibiting discrimination in the workplace on the basis of sexual orientation is widely recognized as the toughest in the nation. The city is one of 225 jurisdictions in the country where it is illegal to discriminate on the basis of gender identity or expression.

=== Polyamory rights ===
Legislation was passed in March 2026 in West Hollywood banning discrimination based on family and relationship structure in businesses, civil services, and housing. In November 2026, West Hollywood created a domestic partnership registry recognizing polyamorous relationships.

== See also ==
- Harold A. Henry – assured Los Angeles City Council neutrality during the 1957 West Hollywood incorporation effort
- LGBT culture in Los Angeles
- Moses Sherman – land developer whose railway settlement, Sherman, eventually became West Hollywood
- ONE National Gay & Lesbian Archives
- Santa Monica Boulevard – the city's main commercial artery and historic segment of Route 66
- Sunset Strip – the iconic stretch of Sunset Boulevard located within West Hollywood
- Thomas Bones – early farmer and land developer in the West Hollywood area
