= John Heilman =

American politician in California

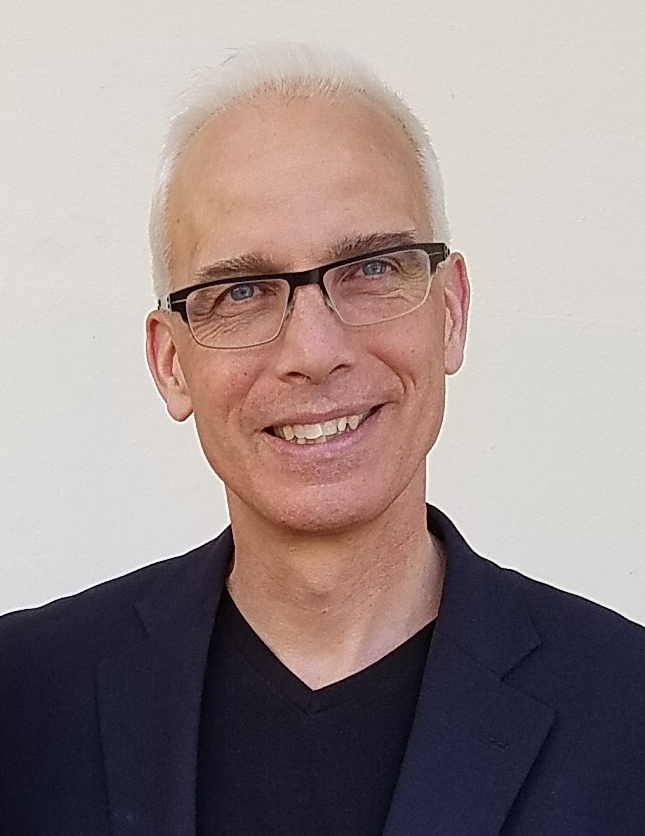
Mayor John Heilman at a fundraiser hosted by the Stonewall Democratic Club, April 2017

John William Heilman is an American law school professor and politician, currently serving as the mayor of West Hollywood, California. He has served as the city's mayor multiple times since and including 1985. (Note: The West Hollywood city government is headed by a five-member city council who "serve for a term of four (4) years and are elected at large. The City Councilmembers select one of their members to serve as Mayor and this office rotates among the members of Council on their yearly reorganization which occurs in April.")

== Education ==
Heilman holds a bachelor's degree in journalism from Northwestern University, a Juris Doctor degree from the University of Southern California, and master's degrees in public administration and real estate development.

== Political career ==
Heilman was active in the incorporation of the City of West Hollywood, and was elected to West Hollywood’s first city council in November 1984; he served multiple terms on the council. While a city council member, in 1985, he successfully introduced domestic partner legislation for city residents and employees that was passed by the city council and created the first domestic partnership registry.

He was picked as the city's second mayor in 1985, and also served as mayor in 1990, 1995, 1999, 2001, 2006, 2010, and 2017, before his current term as mayor in 2026.

== Non-political work ==
Heilman works as a law professor at Southwestern Law School and as an adjunct professor at the USC Gould School of Law.

He is a board member of the Jacaranda Foundation and of Outright International.

== Notable awards ==
He was inducted into the LGBTQ+ Victory Institute’s LGBTQ+ Political Hall of Fame in 2025.

== Personal life ==
Heilman is openly gay, and is one of America’s longest-serving elected officials to be openly gay.
