= La Flesche =

La Flesche may refer to:

== People ==
- Francis La Flesche (1857–1932), Native American ethnologist
- Joseph LaFlesche (c. 1822–1888), head chief of the Omaha tribe
- Marguerite La Flesche Diddock (1862–1945), Native American known for her work with the Office of Indian Affairs
- Rosalie La Flesche Farley (1861–1900), Native American known for advocating for autonomy of the Omaha Tribe
- Susan La Flesche Picotte (1865–1915), Native American medical doctor
- Susette La Flesche (1854–1903), Native American writer

== Other uses ==
- Susan La Flesche Picotte House, house in Nebraska
