= Rosalie, Nebraska =

Village in Thurston County, Nebraska, United States

- Village
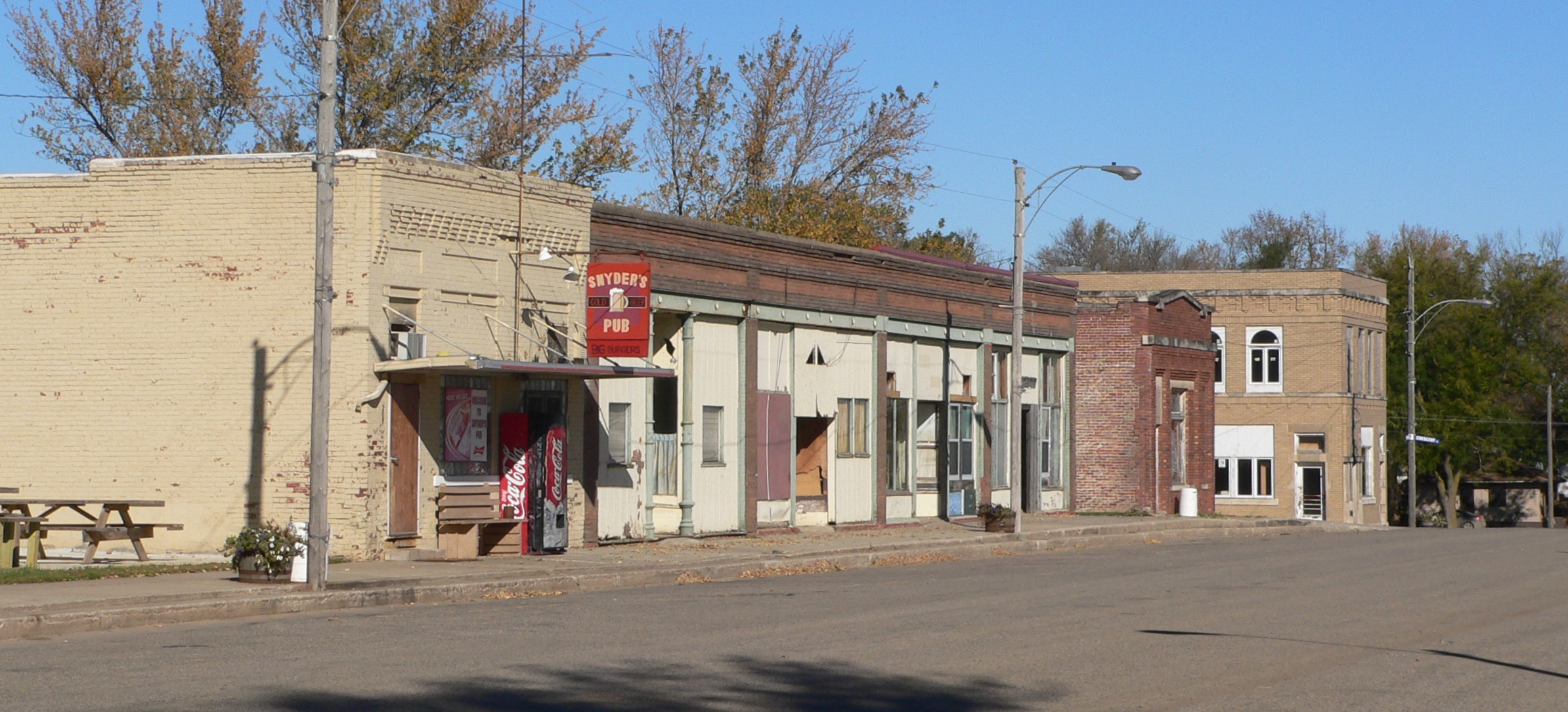
- Downtown Rosalie, October 2010

- Location of Rosalie, Nebraska

- Location within Nebraska Location within the United States
- Coordinates: 42°03′26″N 96°30′46″W
- Country: United States
- State: Nebraska
- County: Thurston
- Township: Dawes

Area
  - Total: 0.20 sq mi (0.51 km^{2})
  - Land: 0.20 sq mi (0.51 km^{2})
  - Water: 0 sq mi (0.00 km^{2})
- Elevation: 1,342 ft (409 m)

Population (2020)
  - Total: 159
  - Density: 812.1/sq mi (313.56/km^{2})
- Time zone: UTC-6 (Central (CST))
  - Summer (DST): UTC-5 (CDT)
- ZIP code: 68055
- Area code: 402
- FIPS code: 31-42250
- GNIS feature ID: 2399115

Rosalie is a village in Thurston County, Nebraska, United States, within the boundaries of the Omaha Indian Reservation. The population was 159 at the 2020 census.

== History ==
Rosalie was platted in 1906 when the Chicago, Burlington & Quincy Railroad was extended to that point.

Rosalie was named for Rosalie La Flesche Farley, a daughter of Joseph La Flesche, the last principal chief of the Omaha tribe selected by traditional means in the nineteenth century, and the only chief of part-European ancestry. After the tribe moved onto the reservation, Rosalie La Flesche became its financial manager, managing grazing leases and other transactions. She married Edward Farley of Bancroft, Nebraska. One of her sisters was the author and activist Susette "Bright Eyes" LaFlesche, who married journalist Thomas Tibbles. Another sister was Susan LaFlesche Picotte, a physician who married a Yankton Sioux man.

== Geography ==
According to the United States Census Bureau, the village has a total area of 0.20 square miles (0.52 km^{2}), all land.

== Demographics ==
Historical population
Census	Pop.	Note	%±
1910	147		—
1920	321		118.4%
1930	279		−13.1%
1940	250		−10.4%
1950	212		−15.2%
1960	182		−14.2%
1970	204		12.1%
1980	224		9.8%
1990	178		−20.5%
2000	194		9.0%
2010	160		−17.5%
2020	159		−0.6%
U.S. Decennial Census

=== 2010 census ===
As of the census of 2010, there were 160 people, 70 households, and 35 families residing in the village. The population density was 800.0 inhabitants per square mile (308.9/km^{2}). There were 83 housing units at an average density of 415.0 per square mile (160.2/km^{2}). The racial makeup of the village was 75.6% White, 1.9% African American, 16.3% Native American, 0.6% from other races, and 5.6% from two or more races. Hispanic or Latino of any race were 4.4% of the population.

There were 70 households, of which 21.4% had children under the age of 18 living with them, 34.3% were married couples living together, 7.1% had a female householder with no husband present, 8.6% had a male householder with no wife present, and 50.0% were non-families. 34.3% of all households were made up of individuals, and 20% had someone living alone who was 65 years of age or older. The average household size was 2.29 and the average family size was 3.00.

The median age in the village was 43.8 years. 20.6% of residents were under the age of 18; 6.9% were between the ages of 18 and 24; 24.4% were from 25 to 44; 26.9% were from 45 to 64; and 21.3% were 65 years of age or older. The gender makeup of the village was 52.5% male and 47.5% female.

=== 2000 census ===
As of the census of 2000, there were 194 people, 74 households, and 52 families residing in the village. The population density was 961.2 inhabitants per square mile (371.1/km^{2}). There were 91 housing units at an average density of 450.9 per square mile (174.1/km^{2}). The racial makeup of the village was 86.08% White, 11.86% Native American, and 2.06% from two or more races.

There were 74 households, out of which 31.1% had children under the age of 18 living with them, 58.1% were married couples living together, 9.5% had a female householder with no husband present, and 29.7% were non-families. 27.0% of all households were made up of individuals, and 17.6% had someone living alone who was 65 years of age or older. The average household size was 2.62 and the average family size was 3.25.

In the village, the population was spread out, with 30.9% under the age of 18, 5.7% from 18 to 24, 23.2% from 25 to 44, 18.6% from 45 to 64, and 21.6% who were 65 years of age or older. The median age was 37 years. For every 100 females, there were 98.0 males. For every 100 females age 18 and over, there were 112.7 males.

As of 2000 the median income for a household in the village was $26,094, and the median income for a family was $30,625. Males had a median income of $18,125 versus $18,125 for females. The per capita income for the village was $12,249. About 3.9% of families and 5.9% of the population were below the poverty line, including 2.0% of those under the age of eighteen and 11.1% of those 65 or over.

== Education ==
The Bancroft and Rosalie schools merged into Bancroft-Rosalie Public Schools in 1982. The combined district is based in Bancroft. In 1999, the junior-senior high school had an enrollment of 164 pupils.

In March 2024, a $17 million bond issue passed, which would drastically expand the current building in Bancroft.

== See also ==
- List of municipalities in Nebraska
