= Josephine Barnaby =

Omaha nurse and missionary

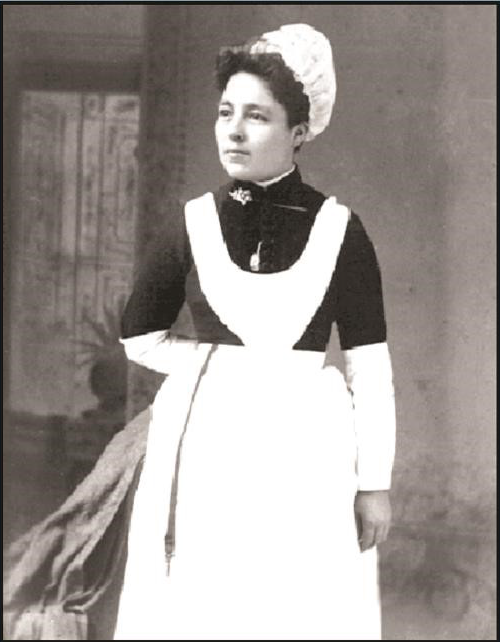
- Born: November 11, 1865; Omaha Reservation
- Died: August 2, 1915 (aged 49); Carlton
- Occupation: Writer

Josephine Erlin Barnaby von Felden (November 11, 1865 – August 2, 1915) was an Omaha nurse and missionary.

Josephine Barnaby was born on November 11, 1865 on the Omaha Reservation. She was the daughter of William Barnaby, an Omaha and Ioway man, and Juliette Barada, daughter of Omaha folk hero Antonine Barada.

She graduated from the Hampton Institute in Hampton, Virginia, in 1887. She then trained as a nurse in New Haven, Connecticut. Returning to Omaha, she worked as teacher and an assistant to Dr. Susan La Flesche Picotte.

In 1880, she published a pamphlet about the Omaha through the American Missionary Association called The Present Condition of My People.

She also worked at the Standing Rock Reservation, heading the hospital there during an epidemic, and the Fond du Lac Reservation.

Josephine Barnaby died on August 2, 1915, in Carlton, Minnesota.

== Personal life ==
In 1891, Barnaby married John von Felden, son of a German immigrant. They had five children, Guy, Gary, Ray, Carroll, and Ramona.
