= Picotte =

Picotte may refer to:

== People ==
- Louis Picotte (1780–1827), Canadian politician
- Susan La Flesche Picotte (1865–1915), Native American medical doctor
- Yvon Picotte (1941–2024), Canadian politician

== Other uses ==
- Susan La Flesche Picotte House, house in Nebraska
- Dr. Susan LaFlesche Picotte Memorial Hospital, hospital in Nebraska
