= Marguerite La Flesche Diddock =

Omaha Reservation educator

Marguerite La Flesche Picotte Diddock
- Born: Marguerite La Flesche; 1862; Omaha Reservation, United States
- Died: 1945 (aged 82–83); Walthill, Nebraska
- Citizenship: Omaha, Ponca, Nebraska

Marguerite La Flesche Diddock (1862–1945), was a Native American known for her work with the Office of Indian Affairs (OIA) and advocacy of cultural assimilation of Native Americans.

Diddock nee La Flesche was born in 1862 on the Omaha Reservation. Her father Joseph La Flesche was the head chief of the Omaha Tribe. La Flesche Farley's siblings include Susette La Flesche, Susan La Flesche Picotte, and Rosalie La Flesche Farley. Her half brother was Francis La Flesche.

La Flesche Diddock attended the Elizabeth Institute for Young Ladies in New Jersey and then attended Hampton Normal & Agricultural Institute in Virginia, graduating in 1887. In 1888 she married Charles Felix Picott who died of tuberculosis a few years after their marriage. She married a second time in 1895 to Walter Diddock with whom she had five children.

La Flesche Diddock taught for many years at the Omaha Agency government school in Nebraska. In 1896 she became a field matron for the Office of Indian Affairs (OIA) (now the Bureau of Indian Affairs), serving until 1900 when she resigned. At the time the OIA directed field matrons to instruct Native American women about Euro-American culture and traditions with the aim of accelerating the adoption of Euro-American culture within the community. La Flesche Diddock remained active in the Omaha Tribe including serving on the election board after the passage of the 19th amendment and working to bring libraries to the area.

La Flesche Diddock died in 1945 in Walthill, Nebraska.
