= Starita =

Starita is a surname. Notable people with the surname include:

- Ernesto Starita (born 1996), Italian footballer
- Joe Starita (born 1948), American journalist and historian

== See also ==
- Staritsa
