= Omaha Township, Thurston County, Nebraska =

Omaha Township
- Township
- Location in Thurston County
- Coordinates: 42°08′53″N 096°28′58″W
- Country: United States
- State: Nebraska
- County: Thurston

Area
  - Total: 44.86 sq mi (116.19 km^{2})
  - Land: 44.84 sq mi (116.14 km^{2})
  - Water: 0.019 sq mi (0.05 km^{2}) 0.04%
- Elevation: 1,201 ft (366 m)

Population (2020)
  - Total: 1,041
  - Density: 23.21/sq mi (8.963/km^{2})
- GNIS feature ID: 0838174

Omaha Township is one of eleven townships in Thurston County, Nebraska, United States. The population was 1,041 at the 2020 census.

The Village of Walthill lies within the Township.

== See also ==
- County government in Nebraska
