= Dawes Township, Thurston County, Nebraska =

Dawes Township
- Township
- Location in Thurston County
- Coordinates: 42°04′00″N 096°28′21″W
- Country: United States
- State: Nebraska
- County: Thurston

Area
  - Total: 52.82 sq mi (136.81 km^{2})
  - Land: 52.82 sq mi (136.81 km^{2})
  - Water: 0 sq mi (0 km^{2}) 0%
- Elevation: 1,410 ft (430 m)

Population (2020)
  - Total: 304
  - Density: 5.76/sq mi (2.22/km^{2})
- GNIS feature ID: 0837958

Dawes Township is one of eleven townships in Thurston County, Nebraska, United States. The population was 304 at the 2020 census.

The Village of Rosalie lies within the Township.

== See also ==
- County government in Nebraska
