= Rosalie La Flesche Farley =

Omaha Indigenous activist (1861–1900)

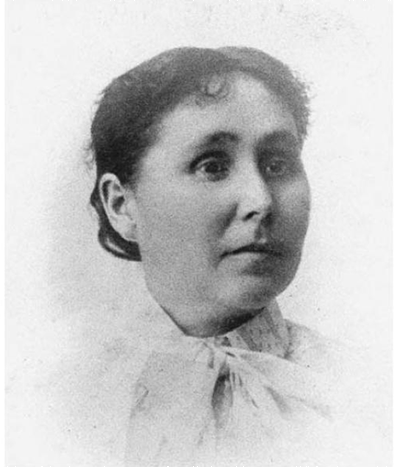
- Born: Rosalie La Flesche; 1861; Omaha Reservation, United States
- Died: 1900 (aged 38–39)
- Citizenship: Omaha, Ponca, Nebraska
- Parent(s): Joseph La Flesche and Mary Gale
- Relatives: Susette La Flesche (sister) Susan La Flesche Picotte (sister) Marguerite La Flesche Diddock (sister) Francis La Flesche (half brother)

Rosalie La Flesche Farley (1861–1900), was a Native American known for advocating for autonomy of the Omaha Tribe.

Farley nee La Flesche was born in 1862 on the Omaha Reservation. Her father Joseph La Flesche (1822–1888) was the head chief of the Omaha tribe. La Flesche Farley's siblings include Susette La Flesche, Susan La Flesche Picotte, and Marguerite La Flesche Diddock. Her half brother was Francis La Flesche.

Rosalie married Ed Farley with whom she had 10 children. The couple advocated for self-government of the Omaha people. They argued for, and prevailed in getting land allocated to individuals but retaining control of the unallocated land to the tribe rather than the state or federal government. She and her husband advocated for autonomy when other family members advocated for "assimilation". La Flesche Farley acted as business manager for the Omaha tribe when the land ownership negotiations were occurring. She was active in financial affairs of the individual members as well as the tribe as a group.

La Flesche Farley died in 1900 at the age of 39. The village of Rosalie, Nebraska is named for her.
