= Susan La Flesche Picotte House =

Historic house in Nebraska, United States

- U.S. National Register of Historic Places
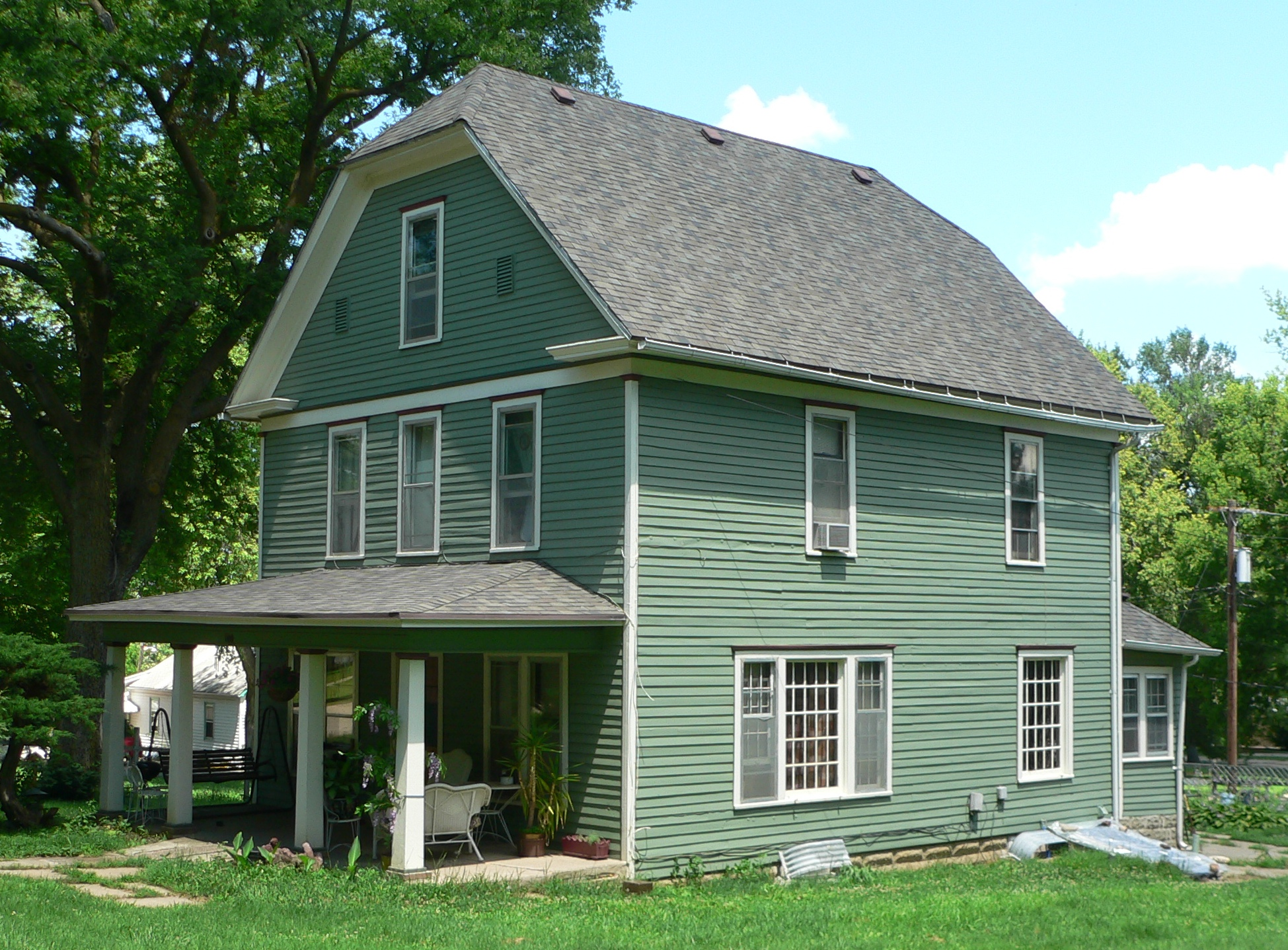

- Location within Nebraska Location within the United States
- Location: 100 Taft, Walthill, Nebraska
- Coordinates: 42°8′53″N 96°29′31″W
- Area: less than one acre
- Built: 1907
- Architectural style: Late Victorian, Folk Victorian
- NRHP reference No.: 09000905
- Added to NRHP: November 10, 2009

The Susan La Flesche Picotte House is a wood-frame house in Walthill, Nebraska built in 1907 that was a home of Dr. Susan La Flesche Picotte, the first Native American medical doctor and a political advocate for the rights of the Omaha people.

The house was listed on the National Register of Historic Places in 2009.

== Description ==
It is a two-and-a-half-story wood-frame house with simple detailing on a concrete block foundation. It is about 20 by 30 feet (6.1 m × 9.1 m) in plan, and it has a one-story addition to the rear and a one-story porch. It looks distinctive relative to simpler gable roof houses, as it has a jerkinhead which clips off the pointy end of the gable, and it has returning eaves, thus making a trapezoidal shape on the front facade above the second floor windows. As of 2009, the house had its original clapboard siding and had recently been painted green with white and maroon trim, compatible with its appearance when Susan La Flesche Picotte lived there.

Also included on the property is a carriage house/garage which housed the carriage that she used to travel in her duties as a doctor and as a tribal leader.

== History ==
Picotte lived in the home from 1907 until her death in 1915. The Dr. Susan Picotte Memorial Hospital, also in Walthill, was built in 1912–13 to serve as a facility for her practice.
