= Joe Starita =

American writing

Joe Starita is an American writer and reporter whose works of nonfiction focus on the history of Plains Indians.

Starita was born in 1948 in Lincoln, Nebraska. He graduated from Lincoln Northeast High School in 1967 and received a Bachelor of Arts Degree in English and Journalism from the University of Nebraska-Lincoln in 1978. After working as an investigative reporter for the Miami Herald and serving as New York Bureau Chief for Knight-Ridder Newspapers from 1979 to 1992, Starita returned to Lincoln as the city editor of the Lincoln Journal-Star from 1997 to 2000. From 2000 to 2021, Starita was a faculty member at the College of Journalism and Mass Communications at the University of Nebraska-Lincoln.

In 1995, Starita published The Dull Knives of Pine Ridge: A Lakota Odyssey, which followed several generations of a Lakota-Northern Cheyenne family in South Dakota. The book was nominated for a Pulitzer Prize for History.

In 2009, he published I Am a Man: Chief Standing Bear's Journey for Justice, which described the Ponca chief Standing Bear's 600-mile walk from Indian Territory in Oklahoma to ancestral Ponca lands in Nebraska for burial. This book was chosen as the selection for the statewide reading program One Book, One Nebraska in 2012. In 2022, the Cherokee Nation Film Office announced plans to create a film based on the book, although the loss of funding from the state of Nebraska in 2023 led to delays.

In 2015, Starita started a scholarship for high school seniors from Nebraska reservations called the Chief Standing Bear Journey Through Justice Scholarship.

In 2016, Starita published A Warrior of the People, the story of Susan La Flesche Picotte, the first Native American doctor in United States history.

When Lincoln Standing Bear High School was dedicated in 2024, Starita addressed a group of students to explain the legacy of the school's namesake.
