= Susette La Flesche =

Native American writer, lecturer, interpreter and artist

- Inshata Theumba "Bright eyes"
- La Flesche in 1879
- Born: c. 1854; Bellevue, Nebraska
- Died: May 26, 1903; Bancroft, Nebraska
- Occupations: Writer, lecturer, interpreter, artist
- Known for: Native American rights activism
- Spouse: Thomas Tibbles (m. 1881)
- Parent(s): Joseph LaFlesche and Mary Gale
- Relatives: Susan La Flesche (sister); Marguerite La Flesche Diddock (sister); Francis La Flesche (half-brother); Peter A. Sarpy (step-grandfather)

Susette La Flesche, later Susette LaFlesche Tibbles and also called Inshata Theumba, meaning "Bright Eyes" (c. 1854–1903), was a well-known Native American writer, lecturer, interpreter, and artist of the Omaha tribe in Nebraska. La Flesche was a progressive who was a spokesperson for Native American rights. She was of Ponca, Iowa, French, and Anglo-American ancestry. In 1983, she was inducted into the Nebraska Hall of Fame. In 1994, she was inducted into the National Women's Hall of Fame.

== Early life and education ==
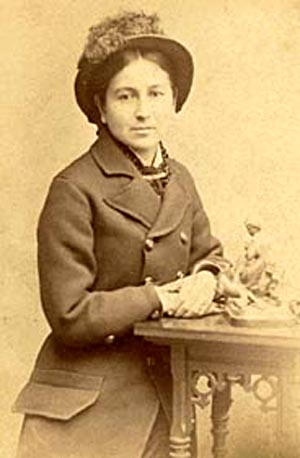

Susette, also called Inshata Theumba (Bright Eyes), was born in Bellevue, Nebraska in about 1854, the eldest daughter of five children born to Joseph LaFlesche and his wife Mary Gale. Joseph was the son of the French fur trader Joseph La Flesche, a wealthy immigrant from France, and his Ponca wife, Waoowinchtcha, reportedly a relative of the Omaha chief Big Elk. After some years of trading with the Omaha while working with Peter Sarpy, the younger La Flesche was adopted as a son by the chief Big Elk. He named him successor to his position. La Flesche, known as "Iron Eyes" became the last traditional chief of the Omaha.

The La Flesches were a "prominent, affluent and acculturated family" among the Omaha. La Flesche and Mary stressed the importance of education for their children: Louis, Susette, Rosalie, Marguerite and Susan, and "favored assimilation". They thought it offered the best future for their people. The La Flesche family supported the missionary schools and white teachers for their children.

As chief, Joseph had a second wife Ta-in-ne (Elizabeth Esau), an Omaha woman, and they married around 1856. The following year, 1857, their son Francis La Flesche was born, followed by other children.

From 1862 to 1869, La Flesche attended Presbyterian Mission Boarding Day School on the reservation where she learned to read, write, and speak in English as well as cook and sew. After the Presbyterian mission school on the reservation closed, Susette La Flesche attended Elizabeth Institute for young ladies, a private school in Elizabeth, New Jersey, where she was followed by her younger sisters Marguerite and Susan. Her writing skills were recognized and encouraged during her school years. The New York Tribune published an essay she wrote her senior year.

Susette's siblings also became professionals: Susan LaFlesche Picotte became the first Native American physician and founded the first privately funded hospital on an Indian reservation; and Rosalie La Flesche Farley became a financial manager for the Omaha nation, leasing grazing land that was excess to individual household needs. Marguerite LaFlesche Picotte was a teacher on the Yankton Sioux reservation, having married Charles Picotte. Their half-brother Francis LaFlesche became an ethnologist for the Smithsonian Institution, writing about the Omaha and the Osage, and making original recordings of their traditional songs.

== Career ==
As a young woman, Susette La Flesche became more interested in politics and soon graduated and learned how to speak English. She first worked as a teacher on the Omaha reservation. She had always wanted to become a teacher and after graduating from school at the Elizabeth Institute for Young Ladies in New Jersey. After returning home, she began to teach, first in the mission school and later at the government school on the Omaha reservation. She also established a Sunday school with the support of William and Julia Hamilton, who were noted to be the Presbyterian missionaries there since 1855.

Since her paternal grandmother and uncle were Ponca, she and her father traveled to Oklahoma to investigate conditions after the tribe's forced removal from Nebraska to Indian Territory. (The US government had reassigned the Ponca land in Nebraska to the Great Sioux Reservation.)

La Flesche worked with Thomas Tibbles, an editor with the Omaha World Herald, to publicize the poor conditions they found at the southern reservation: the Ponca had been moved too late in the year to plant crops, the government was late with supplies and promised infrastructure and improvements, and malaria was endemic in the area. Nearly one-third of the tribe died within the first two years as a result of the journey and conditions, among them the oldest son of Chief Standing Bear. The chief left the Indian Territory with some followers to bury his son in the traditional homeland of Nebraska. They were arrested and confined to Fort Omaha, by order of the federal government. Tibbles' coverage of the chief's imprisonment was instrumental in gaining Standing Bear pro bono legal services by two prominent defense attorneys, including the counsel for the Union Pacific Railroad. Standing Bear filed a suit of habeas corpus against the US government, challenging the grounds for his arrest.

In 1879 La Flesche acted as Standing Bear's interpreter during his lawsuit at Fort Omaha, Nebraska. She also testified as to conditions on the reservation in Indian Territory. Standing Bear successfully challenged the lack of grounds of his arrest and imprisonment, arguing before the United States District Court that Indians were persons under the law, and had all the rights of US citizens. Tibbles attended and reported the case, which gained national attention. Standing Bear v. Crook (1879) was a landmark civil rights case, with the judge deciding that Indians had certain rights as "persons" and citizens under the US constitution. She began serving as a witness and interpreter on other cases where Native Americans sued the U.S. government. After this trial, she received the Indian name "Bright Eyes" for her work advocating for her community.

Following the trial, La Flesche and her half-brother Francis accompanied Standing Bear and others on a speaking tour of the eastern United States, organized by Tibbles. In addition to taking turns interpreting for Standing Bear, Susette La Flesche spoke in her own right. During the tour, La Flesche and Tibbles also testified in Washington in 1880 before a Congressional committee about the Ponca removal. La Flesche spoke for the rights of Native Americans. They met prominent American writers, such as the poet Henry Wadsworth Longfellow and writer Helen Hunt Jackson. In 1881 Jackson published a book about US treatment of Native Americans entitled A Century of Dishonor, and in 1884 the novel Ramona, based on Indian issues in Southern California. Longfellow reportedly said of La Flesche, "This could be Minnehaha", referring to the legendary Indian heroine in his poem The Song of Hiawatha.

In 1887, La Flesche and Tibbles, by then married, accompanied Standing Bear on a 10-month speaking tour of England and Scotland. La Flesche continued to act as the chief's interpreter. They were heard by many who wanted to learn more about the American Indian issues in the United States.

After their return to Nebraska, LaFlesche and Tibbles became interested in the growing Ghost Dance movement and issues among the restive Sioux bands. They went to the Pine Ridge Agency in 1890 and wrote about its conditions, as well as the Wounded Knee massacre. This work was likely the peak of LaFlesche's journalism career. She continued to publish articles and columns in papers in Nebraska, including her husband's populist The Independent.

== Marriage ==
La Flesche and Thomas Tibbles were married in July 1881, after his wife Amelia Owens died. During the next 14 years, the couple spent some time in Washington, DC (1893–1895), but lived mostly in Bancroft, Nebraska to live among the Omaha. While in Washington, La Flesche wrote and lectured on Native American issues. For instance, she gave an address to the Association for the Advancement of Women, on "The Position, Occupation, and Culture of Indian Women."

In Nebraska, she spent time farming on her allotment of land as a tribal member on the Omaha Reservation and also writing. Her husband managed her father's property. They lived there most of the time. Until she died on May 26, 1903, at her home in Nebraska at the age of 49.

== Literary works ==
- "Nedawi: An Indian Story from Real Life" was published in the children's magazine St. Nicholas in 1881. "Nedawi" is thought to be the first short story written by an American Indian which was not based on legend.
- "Omaha Legends and Tent Stories", "Wide Awake" (1883), in Karen L. Kilcup, ed. Native American Women's Writing c. 1800–1924: An Anthology
- With Fannie Reed Griffin, Bright Eyes co-authored the book Oo-mah-ha Ta-wa-tha (1898), and illustrated it.
- Introduction to the novel Ploughed-Under: The Story of an Indian Chief, as Told by Himself (1881), by William Justin Harsha. She also illustrated the book, which she edited.
- Introduction to The Ponca Chiefs, by Thomas Tibbles.
- La Flesche wrote columns for the Omaha World Herald and her husband's Populist paper, The Independent.

== Legacy and honors ==
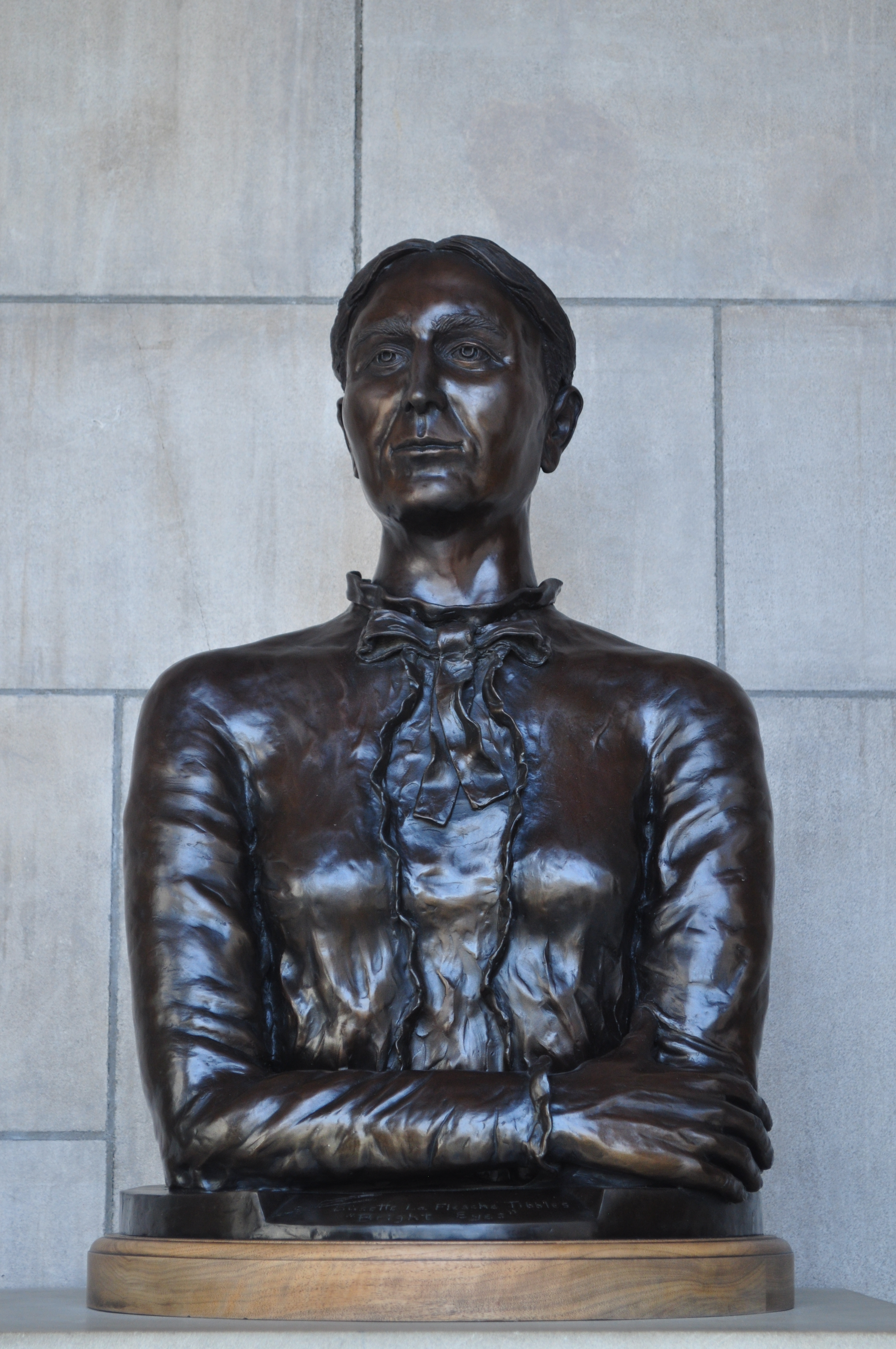
Bust of Pound created by Deborah S. Wagner-Ashton in 1984 for the Nebraska Hall of Fame.

- 1903, after her death, LaFlesche Tibbles was eulogized in the US Senate. Recognized and remembered as the first woman to speak out for the cause of Native Americans.
- 1983, in recognition of her role as a spokesperson and writer about her people, LaFlesche Tibbles was inducted into the Nebraska Hall of Fame.
- 1994, induction into the National Women's Hall of Fame.
