= Walthill, Nebraska =

Village in Thurston County, Nebraska, United States

- Village
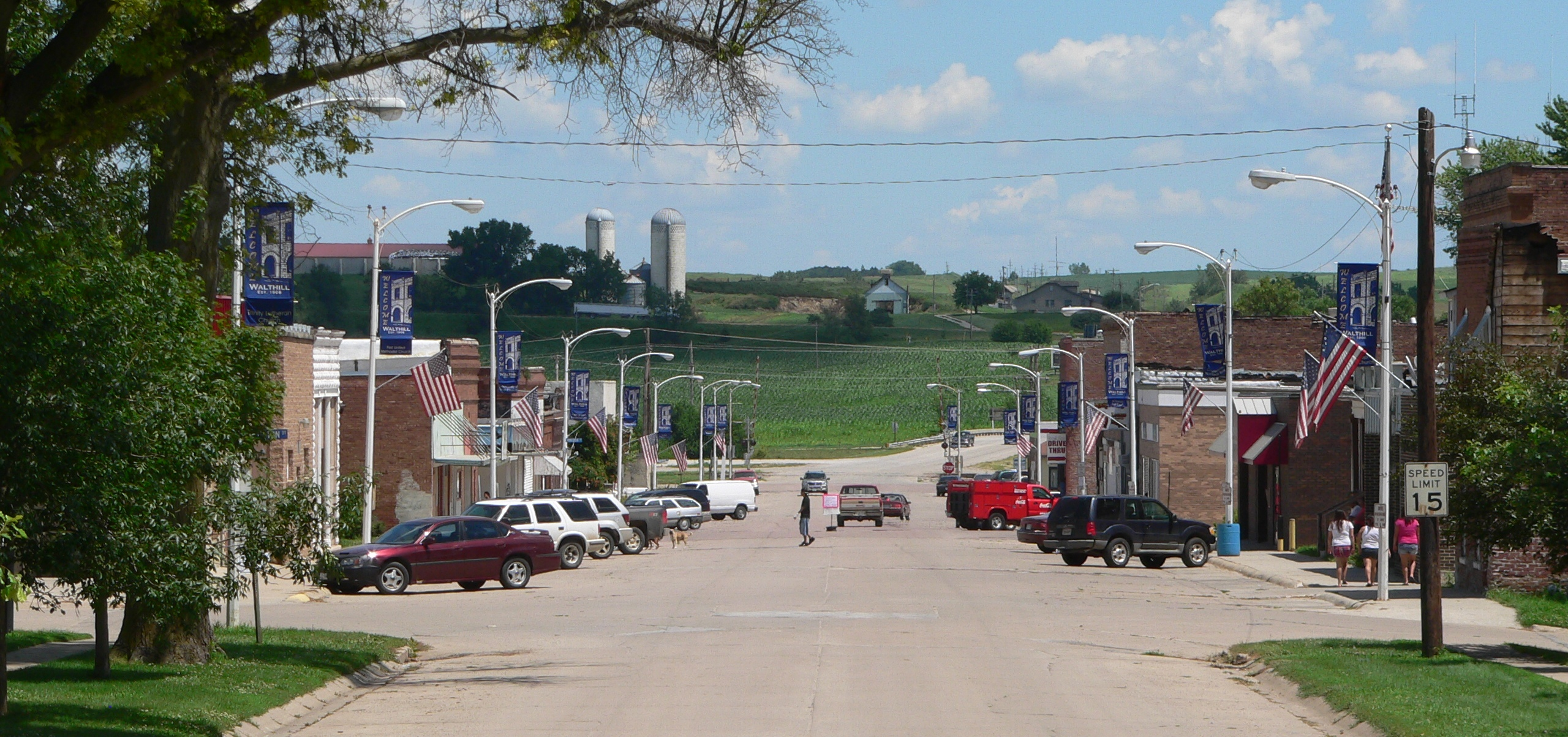
- Downtown Walthill: Main Street, looking east, July 2010

- Location of Walthill, Nebraska

- Location within Nebraska Location within the United States
- Coordinates: 42°08′56″N 96°29′34″W
- Country: United States
- State: Nebraska
- County: Thurston
- Township: Omaha

Area
  - Total: 0.43 sq mi (1.11 km^{2})
  - Land: 0.43 sq mi (1.11 km^{2})
  - Water: 0 sq mi (0.00 km^{2})
- Elevation: 1,253 ft (382 m)

Population (2020)
  - Total: 682
  - Density: 1,594.6/sq mi (615.67/km^{2})
- Time zone: UTC-6 (Central (CST))
  - Summer (DST): UTC-5 (CDT)
- ZIP code: 68067
- Area code: 402
- FIPS code: 31-51245
- GNIS feature ID: 2400090
- Website: walthill.nebraska.gov

Walthill is a village in Thurston County, Nebraska, United States, within the Omaha Reservation. As of the 2020 census, Walthill had a population of 682.

== History ==
Walthill was platted in 1906 when the Chicago, Burlington and Quincy Railroad was extended to that point. It was named for Walter "Walt" Hill, son of railroad executive James J. Hill.

== Geography ==
According to the United States Census Bureau, the village has a total area of 0.43 square miles (1.11 km^{2}), all land.

=== Climate ===
Climate data for Walthill, Nebraska (1991–2020 normals, extremes 1909–2017)
Month	Jan	Feb	Mar	Apr	May	Jun	Jul	Aug	Sep	Oct	Nov	Dec	Year
Record high °F (°C)	69 (21)	72 (22)	98 (37)	97 (36)	104 (40)	107 (42)	113 (45)	108 (42)	104 (40)	94 (34)	84 (29)	76 (24)	113 (45)
Mean daily maximum °F (°C)	30.0 (−1.1)	35.0 (1.7)	48.1 (8.9)	61.3 (16.3)	72.8 (22.7)	82.9 (28.3)	87.0 (30.6)	84.4 (29.1)	78.2 (25.7)	64.0 (17.8)	47.5 (8.6)	33.7 (0.9)	60.4 (15.8)
Daily mean °F (°C)	20.3 (−6.5)	24.7 (−4.1)	36.5 (2.5)	48.6 (9.2)	60.9 (16.1)	71.4 (21.9)	75.4 (24.1)	72.7 (22.6)	64.9 (18.3)	51.2 (10.7)	36.4 (2.4)	24.4 (−4.2)	48.9 (9.4)
Mean daily minimum °F (°C)	10.6 (−11.9)	14.3 (−9.8)	25.0 (−3.9)	36.0 (2.2)	49.0 (9.4)	59.9 (15.5)	63.9 (17.7)	61.0 (16.1)	51.6 (10.9)	38.4 (3.6)	25.3 (−3.7)	15.1 (−9.4)	37.5 (3.1)
Record low °F (°C)	−45 (−43)	−34 (−37)	−25 (−32)	0 (−18)	20 (−7)	35 (2)	37 (3)	35 (2)	20 (−7)	0 (−18)	−18 (−28)	−30 (−34)	−45 (−43)
Average precipitation inches (mm)	0.74 (19)	0.97 (25)	1.66 (42)	3.23 (82)	4.05 (103)	4.50 (114)	3.41 (87)	3.64 (92)	2.96 (75)	2.26 (57)	1.38 (35)	1.01 (26)	29.81 (757)
Average snowfall inches (cm)	6.1 (15)	8.3 (21)	5.1 (13)	2.0 (5.1)	0.1 (0.25)	0.0 (0.0)	0.0 (0.0)	0.0 (0.0)	0.0 (0.0)	0.8 (2.0)	2.9 (7.4)	6.9 (18)	32.2 (82)
Average precipitation days (≥ 0.01 in)	4.3	3.8	4.7	8.0	9.9	9.3	7.3	7.5	5.9	5.1	3.6	3.9	73.3
Average snowy days (≥ 0.1 in)	3.2	2.9	1.8	0.9	0.0	0.0	0.0	0.0	0.0	0.3	1.3	2.9	13.3
Source: NOAA

== Demographics ==
Historical population
Census	Pop.	Note	%±
1910	810		—
1920	1,145		41.4%
1930	1,162		1.5%
1940	1,204		3.6%
1950	958		−20.4%
1960	844		−11.9%
1970	897		6.3%
1980	847		−5.6%
1990	747		−11.8%
2000	909		21.7%
2010	780		−14.2%
2020	682		−12.6%
U.S. Decennial Census

=== 2010 census ===
At the 2010 census, there were 780 people, 207 households and 158 families residing in the village. The population density was 1,814.0 inhabitants per square mile (700.4/km^{2}). There were 240 housing units at an average density of 558.1 per square mile (215.5/km^{2}). The racial makeup of the village was 15.6% White, 0.6% African American, 80.9% Native American, 0.1% Asian, 0.3% Pacific Islander, 0.3% from other races, and 2.2% from two or more races. Hispanic or Latino of any race were 3.3% of the population.

There were 207 households, of which 55.1% had children under the age of 18 living with them, 38.2% were married couples living together, 26.1% had a female householder with no husband present, 12.1% had a male householder with no wife present, and 23.7% were non-families. 18.4% of all households were made up of individuals, and 7.3% had someone living alone who was 65 years of age or older. The average household size was 3.77 and the average family size was 4.33.

The median age was 24.8 years. 40% of residents were under the age of 18; 10.2% were between the ages of 18 and 24; 22% were from 25 to 44; 19.8% were from 45 to 64; and 8.2% were 65 years of age or older. The gender makeup was 49.9% male and 50.1% female.

=== 2000 census ===
At the 2000 census, there were 909 people, 284 households and 205 families residing in the village. The population density was 2,116.1 inhabitants per square mile (817.0/km^{2}). There were 308 housing units at an average density of 717.0 per square mile (276.8/km^{2}). The racial makeup of the village was 27.61% White, 67.88% Native American, 0.11% Asian, 0.99% from other races, and 3.41% from two or more races. Hispanic or Latino of any race were 6.38% of the population.

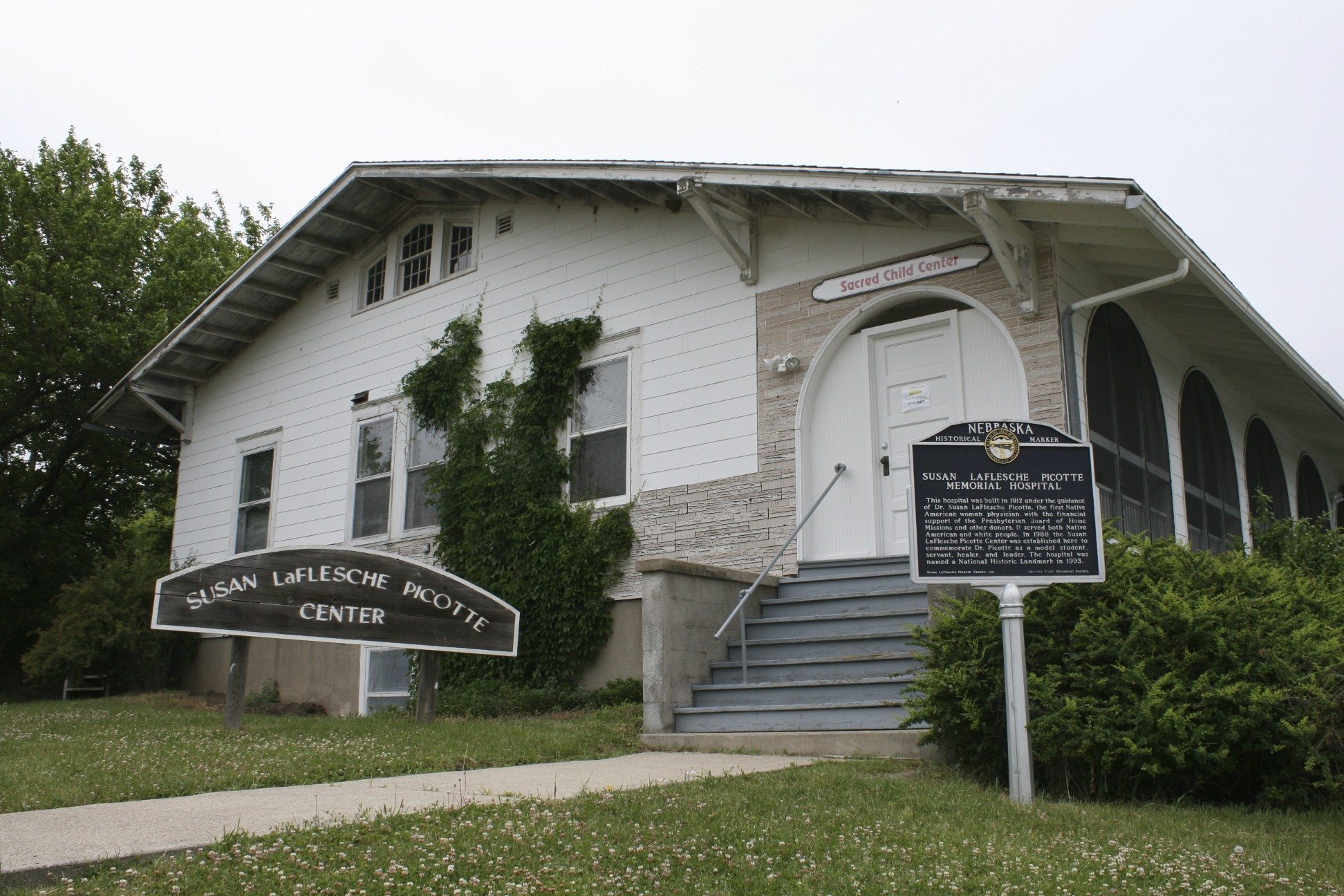
Susan La Flesche Picotte Memorial Hospital in Walthill, June 2009, designated a National Historic Landmark in 1993

There were 284 households, of which 40.5% had children under the age of 18 living with them, 41.2% were married couples living together, 22.2% had a female householder with no husband present, and 27.5% were non-families. 25.4% of all households were made up of individuals, and 12.7% had someone living alone who was 65 years of age or older. The average household size was 3.20 and the average family size was 3.80.

41.3% of the population were under the age of 18, 7.6% from 18 to 24, 25.0% from 25 to 44, 14.9% from 45 to 64, and 11.3% who were 65 years of age or older. The median age was 27 years. For every 100 females, there were 95.5 males. For every 100 females age 18 and over, there were 92.1 males.

The median household income was $28,750 and the median family income was $29,500. Males had a median income of $26,719 and females $21,500. The per capita income was $10,051. About 18.2% of families and 23.0% of the population were below the poverty line, including 26.1% of those under age 18 and 16.5% of those age 65 or over.

== Education ==
The school district is Walthill Public Schools.

== Notable people ==
- Susan La Flesche Picotte, first Native American female physician

== See also ==
- List of municipalities in Nebraska
