= Joseph LaFlesche =

American politician (1822–1888)

- E-sta-mah-za
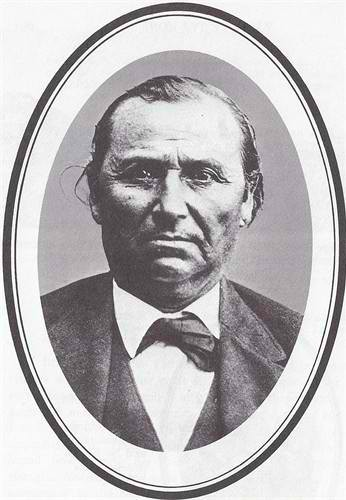
- The last recognized head chief of the Omaha tribe of Native Americans
- Born: c. 1822
- Died: 1888
- Known for: Last recognized Head Chief of the Omaha Tribe
- Children: Susan La Flesche; Susette La Flesche; Francis La Flesche

Joseph LaFlesche, also known as E-sta-mah-za or Iron Eye (c. 1822–1888), was the last recognized head chief of the Omaha tribe of Native Americans who was selected according to the traditional tribal rituals. The head chief Big Elk had adopted LaFlesche as an adult into the Omaha and designated him in 1843 as his successor. LaFlesche was of Ponca and French Canadian ancestry; he became a chief in 1853, after Big Elk's death. An 1889 account said that he had been the only chief among the Omaha to have known European ancestry.

In 1854 LaFlesche was among the seven Omaha chiefs in the delegation who went to Washington, DC for final negotiations and signed the treaty with the United States by which they ceded most of the Omaha territory. About 1856, he led his people in relocating to the Omaha reservation in what is now northeastern Nebraska. LaFlesche served as principal chief until 1888. He led during the Omaha transition to the reservation and other major social changes.

== Early life and education ==
Joseph LaFlesche, also called E-sta-mah-za (Iron Eye), was the son of Joseph LaFlesche, a French-Canadian fur trader, and Waoowinchtcha, his Ponca wife. (An 1889 account said she was related to Big Elk, chief of the Omaha.)

From the age of 10, the younger LaFlesche accompanied his father on trading trips. His father worked for the American Fur Company (AFC) and traded with the many tribes: Ponca, Omaha, Iowa, Otoe, and Pawnee, living between the Platte and Nebraska rivers. They spoke closely related Siouan languages. The father and son learned the Omaha-Ponca language from Waoowinnchtcha, and the Omaha people.

== Career ==
The younger Joseph La Flesche started working for the American Fur Company at about the age of 16 and worked for them until 1848. By then he had settled with his family and the Omaha at the Bellevue Agency. He had been adopted into the Omaha tribe as the son of Big Elk, the principal chief, after years of interaction with the people. In 1843 Big Elk had designated La Flesche as his successor, and the younger man began to study tribal ways and customs, becoming prepared to be chief. He joined the tribal council about 1849.

== Marriage and family ==
LaFlesche married Mary Gale (b. c. 1825-1826 - d. 1909), the mixed-race daughter of Dr. John Gale, a surgeon at Fort Atkinson, and his Iowa wife Ni-co-ma. When Dr. Gale was reassigned after the Army left the fort in 1827, he left Ni-co-ma and Mary behind with her family.

Joseph and Mary LaFlesche had five children together: Louis, Susette, Rosalie, Marguerite and Susan. Iron Eye and Mary believed that the future of American Indians lay in education and assimilation, including adoption of European-style agricultural methods and acceptance of Christianity. They encouraged their children to get formal educations and work for their people; in some cases, LaFlesche sent them to schools in the East.

As chief, Joseph LaFlesche could have multiple wives, and he married Ta-in-ne, an Omaha woman also known as Elizabeth Erasmus. They had a son Francis, born in 1857, followed by other children.

His grown children with Mary included activists Susette LaFlesche Tibbles; and Rosalie LaFlesche Farley, financial manager of the Omaha tribe; Marguerite La Flesche Picotte, who became a teacher on the Yankton Sioux Reservation; and the physician Dr. Susan La Flesche Picotte, the first Native American in the United States to be certified as a doctor. Susan worked with the Omaha and eventually established the first privately funded hospital on an Indian reservation for them. Rosalie Farley helped negotiate grazing treaties on unallocated land to generate revenue. She also helped tribal members with their finances, including managing donations sent by Americans from across the country. She also worked with an ethnologist from the University of Pennsylvania to collect traditions and stories from the tribes.

Their half-brother Francis La Flesche, son of Ta-in-nne, became an ethnologist for the Smithsonian Institution. Based in Washington, DC, he returned to the West to study the Omaha and the Osage. Although the siblings came to hold differing opinions on the issues related to land allotment and assimilation, they each worked to improve the quality of life for Native Americans, particularly the Omaha in Nebraska.

== Chief ==
Unlike many other tribes, the Omaha had a patrilineal kinship system, with inheritance passed through the male line. In 1843, Big Elk designated LaFlesche as his successor as a hereditary chief of the Weszhinste, one of the ten gentes of the Omaha.

The Omaha were organized into two half-tribes or moitie, which represented the Earth and the Sky. Each had five gentes or clans, which had specific responsibilities related to maintaining the tribe and cosmos. Each gens had hereditary chiefs, through the father's line, for a total of ten. One of the gens chiefs of each moitie was designated as its head; the two collaborated to maintain the balance between the two parts. Because a child was considered born to his father and his family, a man born of a white father and Omaha mother had no position in the tribe; he was considered white. To become a member of the tribe, he would have to be formally adopted by the father of a family. He could never advance to be a hereditary chief without such formal adoption, according to the traditional practices in effect at that time. There were some allowances for men to be recognized for charitable acts or gifts.

When adopted and designated by Big Elk as his successor, LaFlesche (Iron Eye) seriously studied the tribal ways and customs to prepare for becoming a chief. Big Elk served as chief until his death in 1853, and LaFlesche succeeded him. An 1889 sketch of La Flesche, first published in the Bancroft, Nebraska Journal, said he was the only person having any white blood who had been a chief of the Omaha.

In January 1854, after negotiations in full council with 60 Omaha men, the tribe reached some agreements on land cession with the US Indian agent James M. Gatewood. They had not delegated this important issue to their chiefs but, after reaching their conclusions, chose seven chiefs to go to Washington, DC for concluding meetings on the land sale. The seven chiefs were LaFlesche, Two Grizzly Bears, Standing Hawk, Little Chief, Village Maker, Noise, and Yellow Smoke. Logan Fontenelle, a Métis man born to a white father, accompanied them as an interpreter. The Bureau of Indian Affairs also had an interpreter at the meetings. For some reason, Fontenelle's name appeared first on the treaty, although the document was supposed to include only the names of the seven Omaha chiefs. Two Grizzly Bears' name did not appear. Perhaps because Fontenelle had been introduced as Two Grizzly Bears' interpreter, or because he was the only Omaha speaker who was literate in English, his name was substituted. The treaty was signed in March 1854 and quickly ratified by the US Senate.

The Indian Commissioner Manypenny and his staff forced many changes to the treaty terms, including a major reduction in the amount of money to be paid to the Omaha for their land, and a change from cash annuities to annuities that were a combination of cash and goods. Under the treaty terms, the Omaha tribe received "$40,000 per annum for three years from January 1, 1855; $30,000 per annum for the next succeeding ten years; $20,000 per annum for the next succeeding fifteen years; and $10,000 per annum for the next succeeding twelve years," to 1895. The President of the United States, based on recommendations by the US Indian Office (or the local US Indian agent), would determine annually the proportions of the annuity to be distributed in money and in goods. In practice, those decisions would be made by the US Indian Office, based on recommendations by the US Indian agent.

Unhappy with Gatewood's draft treaty, the US Indian Office replaced the agent with George Hepner in the summer of 1854. In 1855, Fontenelle and four Omaha were killed and scalped by an enemy band of Sioux while on the summer buffalo hunt on the plains. The historians B. Tong and D. Hastings contend that LaFlesche did not become principal chief until after Fontenelle's death, but accounts have varied as to the true role of Fontenelle in the tribe. Boughter writes that Hepner and LaFlesche both referred to Fontenelle as a chief after his death, but other contemporaries among the Omaha did not agree and referred to him only as the interpreter.

As chief, LaFlesche led the tribe through a period of major transition and social disruption after their move to the reservation in what is now northeast Nebraska in the Blackbird Hills. About 800 Omaha removed to the reservation. At the beginning, they built their traditional sod lodges, with the clans arrayed in customary positions around a circle. By 1881, the tribe had increased to about 1100. Many had built western-style houses. LaFlesche worked to gain the rights of citizens of the United States for the Omaha. In the late nineteenth century, the US government required American Indians to agree to give up their communal land, tribal government and membership in order to gain voting rights as US citizens. They also had to adopt certain aspects of assimilation and learn United States practices.

LaFlesche had supported the changes in land policy in a move toward severalty, believing that the tribe's members would benefit by adopting the ownership of land individually by patent rather than to continue to hold it in common as a tribe. Many in the tribe were of different opinions. In practice, the breakup of communal lands proved to be detrimental to tribal continuity and land use. LaFlesche encouraged his people to become educated in both Omaha and American ways, supporting the mission schools. Seeing how detrimental alcohol was, he prohibited it on the reservation. He and Henry Fontenelle were appointed as official traders to the Omaha under the US Indian agent.

LaFlesche was chief at a time when many of the Omaha resisted the changes that had disrupted their lives. For some time, many of the men lived on their portion of the annuities and hunting, and the women continued to cultivate varieties of corn in a communal way. The Omaha stayed in their villages rather than going out to farm the land.

But by 1880, the Omaha produced 20,000 bushels of wheat, including a surplus for sale. The following year was a poor season, and they had less than needed of all their crops. The government's estimate of sufficient land allotments for the Native Americans restricted them to dividing their lands among heirs, in portions that in future years were too small to be farmed effectively or to be developed for other purposes. In addition, when government annuities and supplies were delayed or arrived in poor condition, as was often the case, or the Indian agents made decisions restricting annuities, as did Jacob Vore in 1876, the Omaha faced much worse conditions on their reservation than in their former nomadic life.
