= Bancroft, Nebraska =

- Village
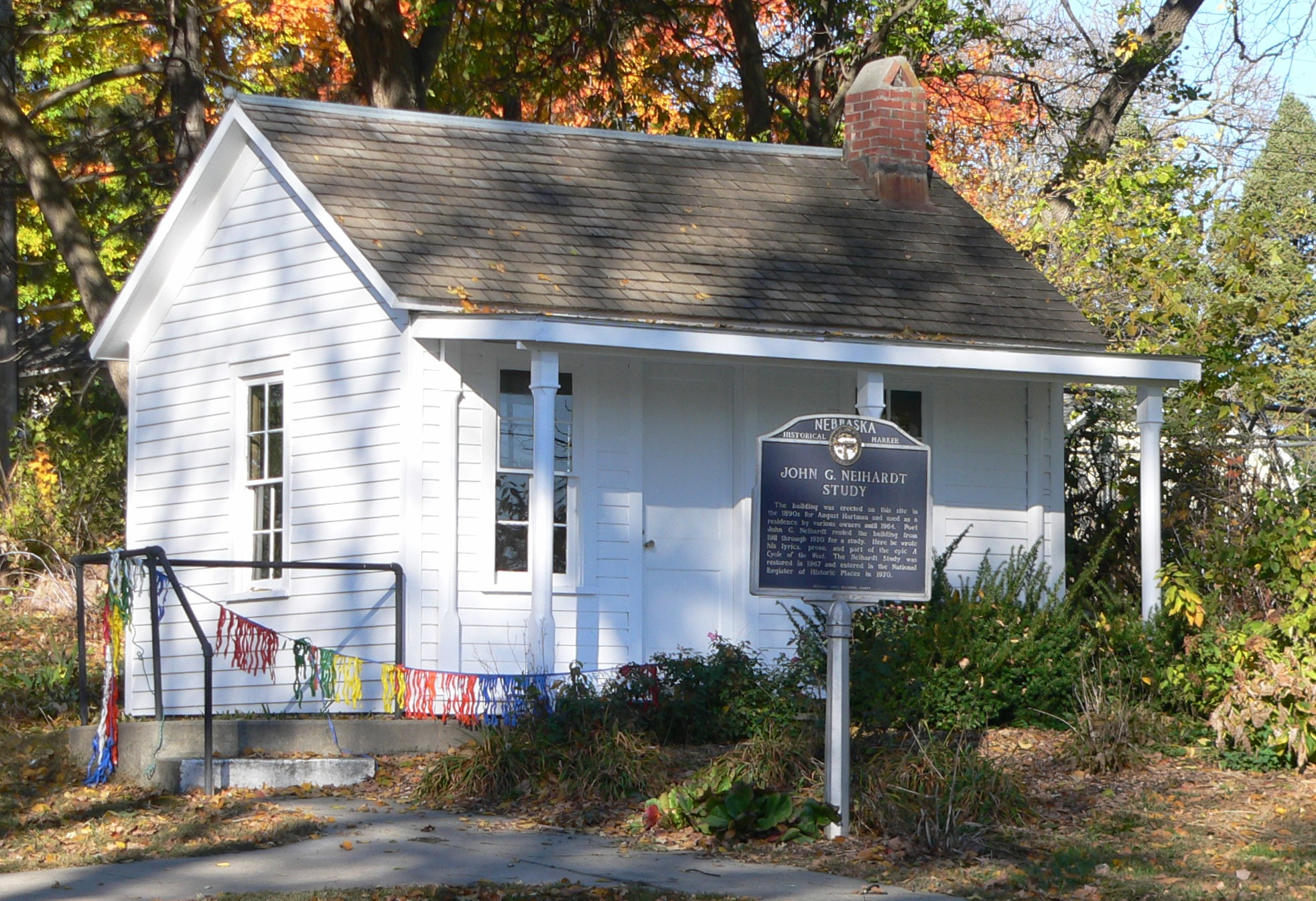
- John G. Neihardt study in Bancroft
- Motto: "Where Quality Of Life Is Still Cherished"
- Location of Bancroft, Nebraska
- Coordinates: 42°00′38″N 96°34′24″W
- Country: United States
- State: Nebraska
- County: Cuming

Area
  - Total: 0.37 sq mi (0.95 km^{2})
  - Land: 0.37 sq mi (0.95 km^{2})
  - Water: 0 sq mi (0.00 km^{2})
- Elevation: 1,345 ft (410 m)

Population (2020)
  - Total: 496
  - Density: 1,354.6/sq mi (523.01/km^{2})
- Time zone: UTC-6 (Central (CST))
  - Summer (DST): UTC-5 (CDT)
- ZIP code: 68004
- Area code: 402
- FIPS code: 31-03005
- GNIS feature ID: 2398027
- Website: www.bancroftnebraska.com

Bancroft is a village in Cuming County, Nebraska, United States. The population was 496 as of the 2020 census.

John Neihardt, who later became Nebraska's poet laureate, lived in Bancroft for twenty years and wrote many of his works there. His study is preserved at the John G. Neihardt State Historic Site in the village.

== History ==
Succeeding cultures of indigenous peoples lived in the area for thousands of years before European encounter. By the mid-eighteenth century, the Omaha tribe lived on the west side of the Missouri River throughout this area.

The settlement was originally known as Unashta Zinga, meaning "little stopping place" in a Native American language. The site that became Bancroft was homesteaded in the mid-1870s by Ford Bella Barber and Deborah (Watson) Barber, who came from Maine to settle in Nebraska. In 1880, when the Chicago, St. Paul, Minneapolis and Omaha Railway began planning a line through the area, the Barbers deeded 80 acres (32 ha) of land to the railway for the platting of a town. At that time, the approximately 25 residents were of mostly German, Irish, and Scandinavian descent; some were immigrants. When the village was platted, townspeople named it Barbersville, but the couple refused the honor. The village was named after George Bancroft. Sources differ on who this was. In her 1925 Nebraska Place-Names, Lilian Linder Fitzpatrick says that it was historian George Bancroft. However, more recent sources say that the Bancroft whose name was used was "a well-liked civil engineer with the railroad".

In 1884, 50,000 acres (20,000 ha) of the Omaha Reservation was sold to "actual residents". This brought an influx of white settlers to that portion of the reservation; and Bancroft, located at the southern edge of the reservation, profited from the increased business. The population grew until 1910, when it reached a peak of 742. The Great Depression drove many of Bancroft's residents away to larger cities; but the onset of World War II brought a revival of prosperity.

== John Neihardt ==
In 1900, the 19-year-old John G. Neihardt and his family moved to Bancroft, where he worked as assistant to a trader with the Omaha. He learned about the Omaha traditions and customs while working with them. Neihardt had already begun writing; he had published his first book, The Divine Enchantment, in 1897. His experiences among the Omaha strongly influenced his subsequent work.

In September 1903, Neihardt became co-owner and editor of the weekly Bancroft Blade. He resigned this position in January 1905; he had enjoyed writing editorials, but could not maintain interest in the stuff of local news. From that point, he devoted himself to writing fiction and poetry, quickly winning national recognition.

In 1911, Neihardt rented a one-room building for a study. In 1912, he began his epic Cycle of the West there. He continued to work in the study until 1920, when he moved to Branson, Missouri. In the following year, the Nebraska Legislature named him "Poet Laureate of Nebraska and the Plains".

Neihardt's study was restored in 1967; in 1970, it was listed in the National Register of Historic Places. In 1976, the John G. Neihardt State Historic Site was opened. Beside the studio, this includes a museum, a library, and the restored Sacred Hoop Prayer Garden. This was designed based on symbolism in Niehardt's Black Elk Speaks (1932). This has become his best-known work, based on the oral history and spiritual teachings of Black Elk, a prominent Oglala Lakota sachem or medicine man.

== Geography ==
Bancroft is located 19 miles (31 km) northeast of the county seat of West Point.

According to the United States Census Bureau, the village has a total area of 0.37 square miles (0.96 km^{2}), all land.

=== Climate ===
Climate data for Bancroft, Nebraska (coordinates:42.0149°N 96.5756°W, 1991-2020)
Month	Jan	Feb	Mar	Apr	May	Jun	Jul	Aug	Sep	Oct	Nov	Dec	Year
Average precipitation inches (mm)	0.69 (18)	0.80 (20)	1.65 (42)	3.42 (87)	4.09 (104)	4.89 (124)	3.33 (85)	3.85 (98)	3.50 (89)	2.60 (66)	1.30 (33)	1.14 (29)	31.26 (795)
Source: NOAA

== Demographics ==
Historical population
Census	Pop.	Note	%±
1890	344		—
1900	733		113.1%
1910	742		1.2%
1920	673		−9.3%
1930	660		−1.9%
1940	599		−9.2%
1950	596		−0.5%
1960	496		−16.8%
1970	545		9.9%
1980	552		1.3%
1990	494		−10.5%
2000	520		5.3%
2010	495		−4.8%
2020	496		0.2%
U.S. Decennial Census

=== 2010 census ===
As of the census of 2010, there were 495 people, 210 households, and 137 families residing in the village. The population density was 1,337.8 inhabitants per square mile (516.5/km^{2}). There were 232 housing units at an average density of 627.0 per square mile (242.1/km^{2}). The racial makeup of the village was 92.9% White, 1.8% Native American, 0.2% Asian, 2.4% from other races, and 2.6% from two or more races. Hispanic or Latino of any race were 2.4% of the population.

There were 210 households, of which 30.0% had children under the age of 18 living with them, 55.7% were married couples living together, 6.2% had a female householder with no husband present, 3.3% had a male householder with no wife present, and 34.8% were non-families. 30.5% of all households were made up of individuals, and 15.8% had someone living alone who was 65 years of age or older. The average household size was 2.36 and the average family size was 2.99.

The median age in the village was 40.9 years. 26.1% of residents were under the age of 18; 7.4% were between the ages of 18 and 24; 20.9% were from 25 to 44; 27.8% were from 45 to 64; and 18.2% were 65 years of age or older. The gender makeup of the village was 48.1% male and 51.9% female.

=== 2000 census ===
As of the census of 2000, there were 520 people, 227 households, and 138 families residing in the village. The population density was 1,417.7 inhabitants per square mile (547.4/km^{2}). There were 252 housing units at an average density of 687.1 per square mile (265.3/km^{2}). The racial makeup of the village was 97.69% White, 0.96% Native American, 0.58% Pacific Islander, and 0.77% from two or more races.

There were 227 households, of which 33.5% included children under the age of 18, 48.0% were married couples living together, 7.5% had a female householder with no husband present, and 38.8% were non-families. 37.9% of all households were made up of individuals, and 27.8% had someone living alone who was 65 years of age or older. The average household size was 2.29 and the average family size was 3.04.

The median age in Bancroft was 39 years. 28.8% of the inhabitants were under the age of 18; 4.0% were between 18 and 24; 23.1% were between 25 and 44; 18.1% were between 45 and 64; and 26.0% were aged 65 years or older. For every 100 females, there were 97.7 males; for every 100 females aged 18 or over, there were 88.8 males.

The median income for a household in the village was $28,500, and the median income for a family was $36,667. Males had a median income of $31,250 versus $20,385 for females. The per capita income for the village was $17,244. About 11.1% of families and 10.8% of the population were below the poverty line, including 5.3% of those under the age of 18 and 22.1% of those 65 and older.

== Economy ==
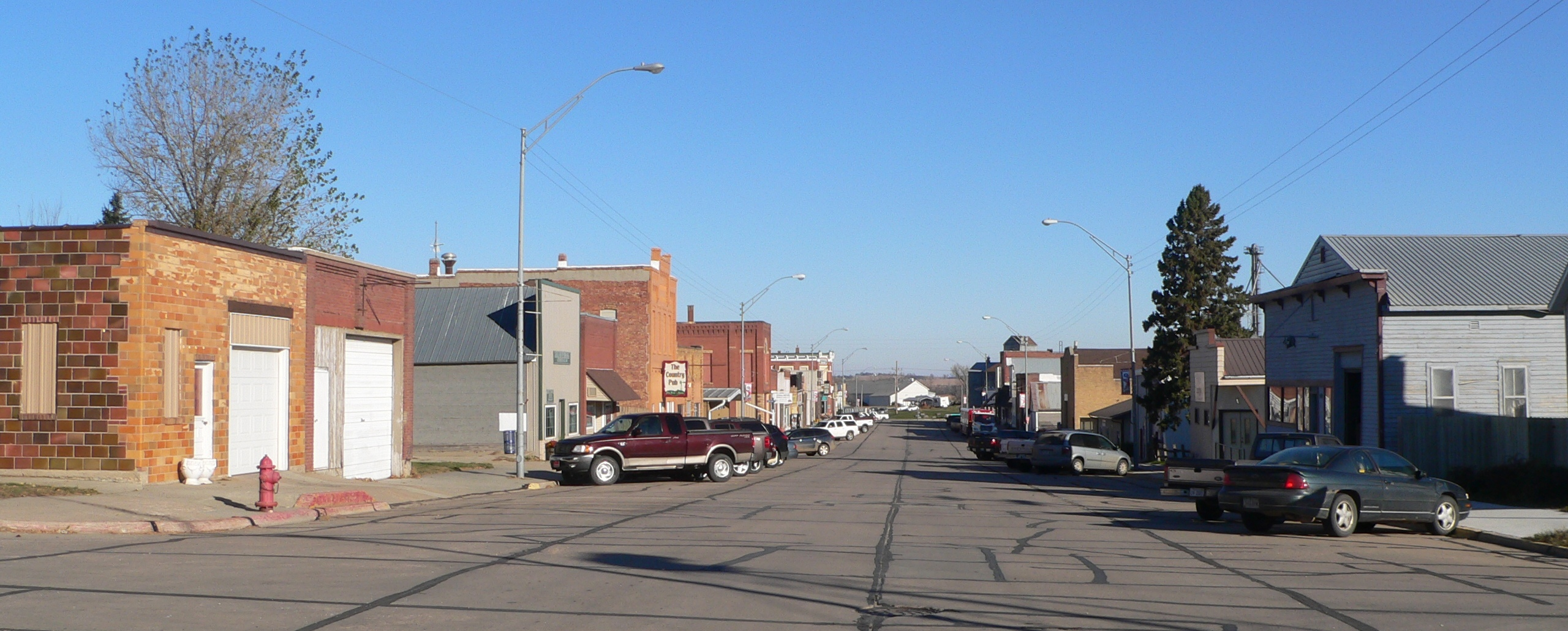
Main Street in Bancroft

The two leading employers in Bancroft are governmental: the Village of Bancroft, and Bancroft Public Schools. The larger private employers include Renz Electric, a plumbing, heating, and electric contracting firm with 15 employees; and Triple C Products, a manufacturer of agricultural implements with 12 employees.

Tourism is an important facet of Bancroft's economy; the Neihardt Center draws visitors from all over the country. Annual events at the Center include a scholarly conference the last Saturday in April and an outdoor Neihardt Day festival held the first Sunday in August.

== Education and media ==
The Bancroft and Rosalie schools merged into Bancroft-Rosalie Public Schools in 1982. The combined district is based in Bancroft. In 1999, the junior-senior high school had an enrollment of 164 pupils.

In March 2024, a $17 million bond issue passed, which would drastically expand the current building in Bancroft.

The Bancroft Public Library has a collection of 8,170 volumes.

Neihardt's newspaper, the Bancroft Blade, was absorbed by the Wisner, Nebraska Wisner News-Chronicle in 1954.

== Infrastructure and transportation ==
Bancroft is near the junction of Nebraska Highway 16 and Nebraska Highway 51. There are no Interstate or four-lane highways through or near the village.

The railway station in Bancroft closed in 1963. The nearest railroad is the BNSF Railway, 25 miles (40 km) away. The nearest river port is Sioux City, Iowa on the Missouri River, 45 miles (72 km) from Bancroft. The nearest international airport is Eppley Airfield in Omaha, 88 miles (142 km) away.

Bancroft's electric power is supplied by Cuming County Public Power District, based in West Point. Natural gas is provided by Black Hills Energy, a subsidiary of the Black Hills Corporation. The Village of Bancroft provides water and sewer services.

Fire protection is supplied by a 23-member volunteer fire department. Bancroft has one full-time and one part-time police officer.

A medical clinic in Bancroft is staffed two days a week by personnel from the Pender Community Hospital, located10 miles (16 km) away, in Pender.
