= Omaha Reservation =

Indian reservation in Nebraska and Iowa, US

Omaha Reservation Umoⁿhoⁿ tóⁿde ukʰéthiⁿ (Omaha–Ponca)
- Indian reservation
- Location of the Omaha Reservation in Nebraska

- Location in the United States
- Coordinates: 42°05′33″N 96°32′09″W
- Tribe: Omaha
- Country: United States
- State: Nebraska and Iowa
- County: Thurston County, Nebraska, Cuming County, Nebraska, Burt County, Nebraska and Monona County, Iowa
- Headquarters: Macy

Area
  - Total: 309.993 sq mi (802.88 km^{2})
  - Land: 307.032 sq mi (795.21 km^{2})
  - Water: 2.961 sq mi (7.67 km^{2})

Population (2020)
  - Total: 4,526
  - Density: 14.7/sq mi (5.7/km^{2})
- Website: Omaha Tribe of Nebraska

The Omaha Reservation (Omaha–Ponca: Umoⁿhoⁿ tóⁿde ukʰéthiⁿ) of the federally recognized Omaha tribe is located mostly in Thurston County, Nebraska, with sections in neighboring Cuming and Burt counties, in addition to Monona County in Iowa. As of the 2020 federal census, the reservation population was 4,526. The tribal seat of government is in Macy. The villages of Rosalie, Pender and Walthill are located within reservation boundaries, as is the northernmost part of Bancroft. Due to land sales in the area since the reservation was established, Pender has disputed tribal jurisdiction over it, to which the Supreme Court ruled unanimously in 2016 that "the disputed land is within the reservation’s boundaries."

== History ==
The reservation was established by a treaty at Washington, D.C., dated March 16, 1854. By this treaty, the Omaha Nation sold the majority of its land west of the Missouri River to the United States, but was authorized to select an area of 300,000 acres (470 sq mi; 1,200 km^{2}) to keep as a permanent reservation. The Omaha Nation chose an area around the Blackbird Hills and obtained the President's approval on May 11, 1855.

In a treaty on March 6, 1865, the Omaha Nation agreed to sell the northern part of the reservation to the United States for the use of Ho-Chunk refugees from Crow Creek, South Dakota who became the Winnebago Tribe of Nebraska, establishing the Winnebago Reservation just north of the Omaha Reservation. The Omahas later conveyed an additional 12,348 acres of timber land to the Winnebago Reservation through an act of Congress on June 22, 1874, and a deed dated July 31, 1874. This reduced the Omaha Reservation to its present size.

Federal legislation in the late nineteenth century caused the reservation to be allotted, ultimately enabling white settlers to buy most of the land on the reservation. An act on June 10, 1872, authorized the survey and sale of land on the western end of the reservation, but the property initially failed to attract buyers, resulting in the sale of only 300.72 acres (1.2170 km^{2}) the first year.

Through the lobbying efforts of anthropologist Alice Cunningham Fletcher, Congress passed another act on August 7, 1882, that divided the eastern portion of the reservation into individual allotments for Omaha tribal members, while authorizing the sale of land west of the Sioux City and Nebraska Railroad to settlers and speculators. Fletcher personally oversaw the allotments, allocating 76,810 acres (310.8 km^{2}) to 954 tribal members and leaving about 55,000 acres (220 km^{2}) in tribal ownership. The 1882 act on the Omaha Reservation served as a model for the Dawes Act of 1887, which authorized the similar allotment of land on reservations nationwide. An additional act on March 3, 1893, allotted most of the remaining Omaha tribal land to individual women and children who had been left out of the 1882 legislation.

The sale of land on the reservation has led to numerous jurisdictional disputes between the Omaha Nation and the white-led government of Thurston County, which is entirely within the Omaha and Winnebago reservations. Special legislation in 1916 empowered the county to assess property tax on Omaha allotments, forcing a large number of tribal members to sell or mortgage their allotment land to outsiders in order to pay back taxes. The county continued to tax tribal trust land until the 1970s, when federal courts ruled that the tribe could not be taxed without its consent.

On July 15, 2025 the Omaha Tribal Council unanimously adopted a code allowing for the sale of marijuana to adults over 21 on tribal land, including to non-tribal visitors. The reservation was the first in Nebraska to pass regulations for cannabis use.

== Geography ==
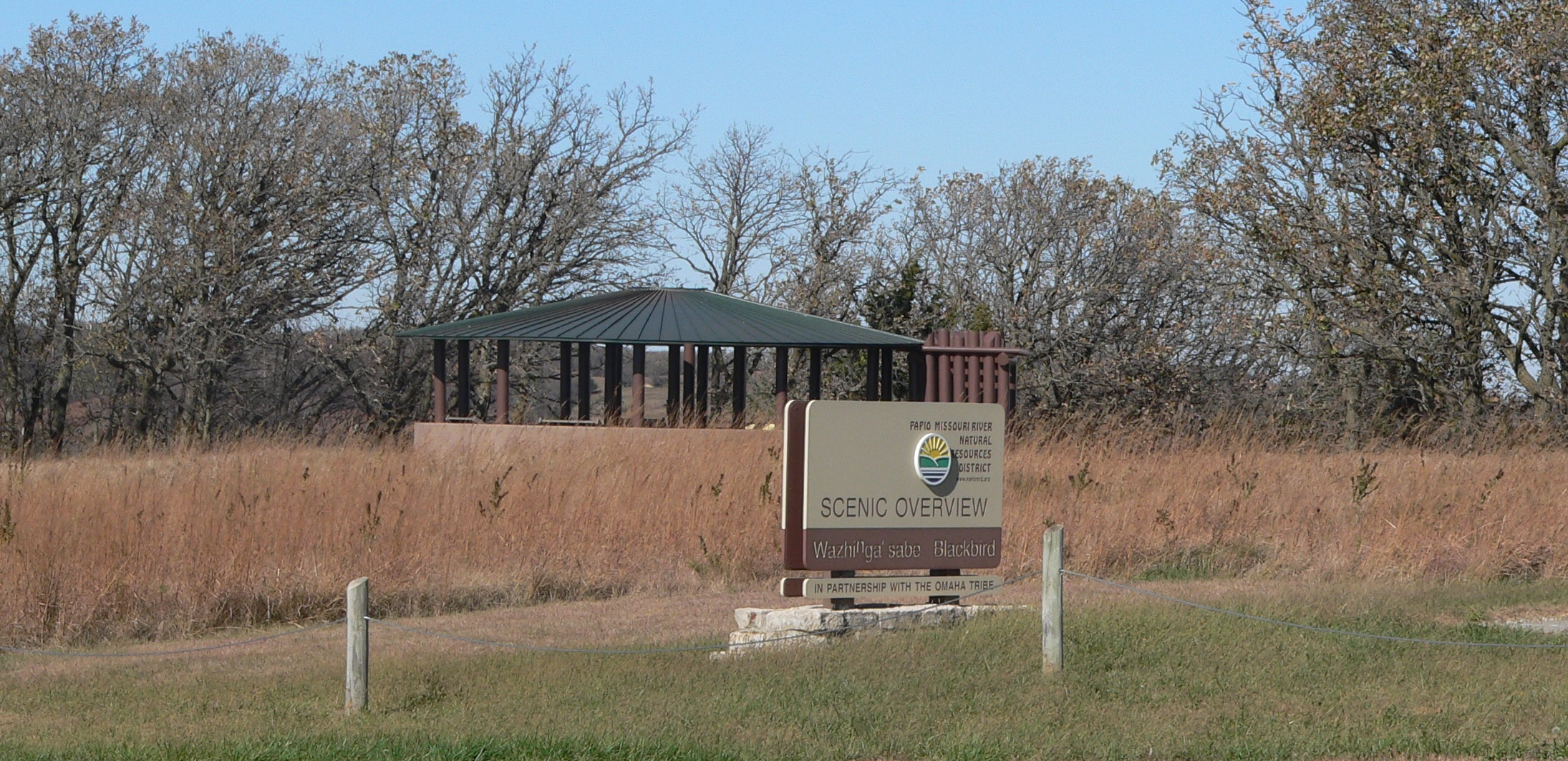
Blackbird scenic overlook on the Omaha Reservation

According to the United States Census Bureau, the reservation has a total area of 309.99 square miles (802.9 km^{2}), of which 307.03 square miles (196,500 acres; 795.2 km^{2}) is land and 2.96 square miles (7.7 km^{2}) is water.

Due to allotments in the late nineteenth century, much of the reservation is no longer tribally-owned. According to the Bureau of Indian Affairs, the Omaha Nation's trust land amounts to 27,828 acres (43.481 sq mi; 112.62 km^{2}), or about 14.2% of the total reservation land area.

== Demographics ==
As of the census of 2020, the population of the Omaha Reservation was 4,526. The population density was 14.7 inhabitants per square mile (5.7/km^{2}). There were 1,563 housing units at an average density of 5.1 per square mile (2.0/km^{2}). The racial makeup of the reservation was 47.6% Native American, 47.5% White, 0.3% Asian, 0.2% Black or African American, 0.1% Pacific Islander, 1.6% from other races, and 2.7% from two or more races. Ethnically, the population was 4.1% Hispanic or Latino of any race.

== Boundary disputes ==
Boundary claims and areas of jurisdiction have continued to be issues for the Omaha Indian Reservation. In the late nineteenth century, Congress authorized sales of land to non-Omaha in the western portion of the reservation, where European-American farmers had settled. Due to the sales and federal legislation subsequent to the treaty establishing the reservation, a Nebraska state court in 2000 ruled that the western boundary of the reservation ended at railroad tracks east of Pender, Nebraska.

The Omaha Tribe contends that Pender is within tribal jurisdiction, as Congress did not change the boundaries of reservation, which includes most of Thurston County. The tribe says that the state does not have the power to redefine the boundary set by the Omaha treaty with the US government in 1865. It holds that although Congress authorized land sales in this area, it did not diminish the jurisdiction of the tribe within the reservation boundaries. "Under Supreme Court precedent, only Congress can diminish a reservation."

Asked for its opinion on a related matter related to the Omaha Tribe's law that liquor merchants on the reservation had to pay tribal license fees and sales taxes (see section below), the Nebraska state attorney general noted its opinion, based on Congressional laws and a field ruling during the Ronald Reagan administration, that Pender was outside the reservation boundaries. It also noted that ultimately this was a matter of federal jurisdiction.

There have been continuing issues related to tribal jurisdiction in Pender and other areas along its western boundary. For instance, in 2003 the tribal police tried to stop non-Omaha people from entering the reservation from Pender. The tribe negotiated with the state in 2003–2004 related to its policing functions in this area, but the parties signed no agreement. Prior to this period, the state generally had policing functions on the roads and in Pender.

On March 22, 2016, the United States Supreme Court held, in a unanimous decision, that Pender is within the reservation's boundaries.

== Current issues ==
In December 2006, the Omaha Tribe issued notices to the seven liquor stores in Pender (which has a population of 1,000), as well as those in Rosalie and Walthill, Nebraska, informing them that as of January 1, 2007, the merchants would have to pay the Omaha Tribe liquor licensing fees and a 10 percent sales tax to continue to operate within the reservation. The executive director of the Nebraska State Liquor Commission said that he would be consulting with the state attorney general on the issue. Ben Thompson, an Omaha attorney who represents the tribe, notes that it has the legal right to establish such laws within the reservation. The Nebraska Attorney General offered the opinion that the Omaha Tribe had the authority to regulate liquor sales on its reservation and it did not interfere with the Nebraska Liquor Commission. While offering an opinion, he said the tribal boundary was a federal jurisdictional issue.

In April 2007, liquor merchants in Pender (later joined by the village) filed a federal lawsuit challenging the tribe's authority to demand the liquor taxes, based on their contention that Pender was outside the reservation boundaries. In October 2007 the US District Court ordered the parties first to take their challenge to the Omaha Tribal Courts, as part of the tribal exhaustion doctrine, and denied the plaintiffs' request for dismissal. Judge Richard Kopf said he may not be bound by the tribal court, but wanted to hear their opinion. He required the parties to report back to him regularly until a ruling was made by the Omaha Tribal Courts. While the case was pending, the judge ordered a temporary stay on the merchants' paying the liquor sales tax.

In January 2012, the plaintiffs in Pender v. Omaha Tribe filed a request with the Omaha Tribal Courts for a summary judgment due to the length of time the case had taken. The defendants had requested that no hearing be held before June 2012. The plaintiffs had submitted a report to them by an expert witness on transactions related to Pender and the western boundary. In 2008 the village had voted for a five-year, 1% sales tax to finance its lawsuit on the boundary and liquor tax, as well as to promote economic development in the town. Residents voted in May 2012 on whether to renew the sales tax, as the boundary issue continued.

== See also ==
- Native American tribes in Nebraska
- Dr. Susan LaFlesche Picotte Memorial Hospital
- Omaha Nation Public Schools
