= Nebraska Highway 116 =

State highway in Nebraska, U.S.

State Highway 116

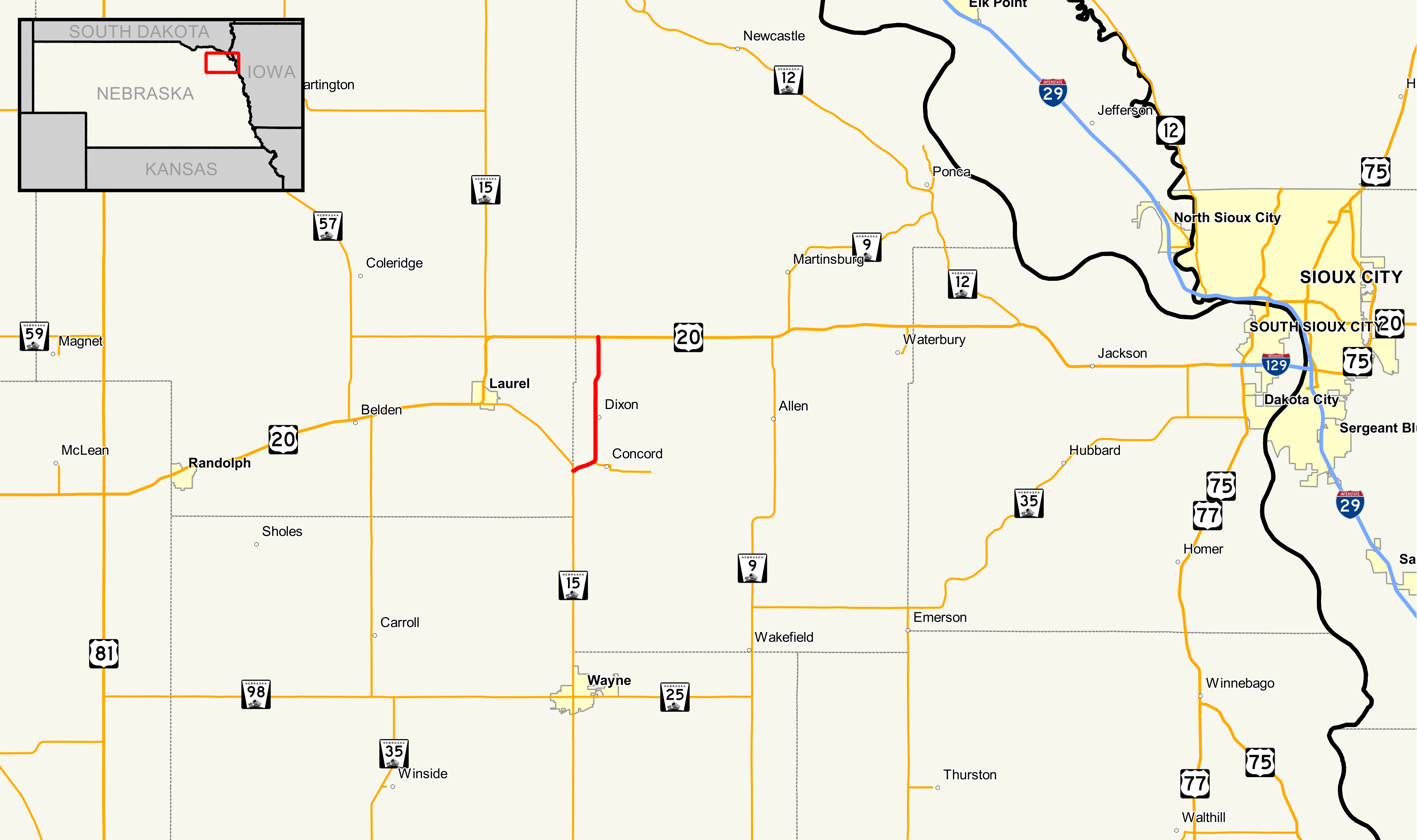
- Nebraska Highway 116 highlighted in red

Route information
- Maintained by NDOT
- Length: 6.60 mi (10.62 km)
- Existed: 1953–present
- Restrictions: 14-foot-8-inch (4.47 m) height clearance on bridge over Logan Creek Dredge

Major junctions
- South end: N-15 west of Concord
- S-26B west of Concord
- North end: US 20 north of Dixon

Location
- Country: United States
- State: Nebraska
- Counties: Dixon

Highway system
- Nebraska State Highway System; Interstate; US; State; Link; Spur; State Spurs; Recreation
← N-112	→ N-121

Nebraska Highway 116 (N-116) is a state highway in southeastern Dixon County, Nebraska, United States, that connects Nebraska Highway 15 (N-15), west of Concord, with U.S. Route 20 (US 20) north of Dixon. N-116 is a two-lane road located entirely within rural agricultural area.

== Route description ==
Prior to 1971, Nebraska Spur 26B was designated as Nebraska State Spur 1116

N-116 begins a T intersection with N-15 on the Cedar–Dixon county line, west of Concord. (N-15 heads north toward Laurel and Hartington and south toward Wayne.) From its southern terminus, N-116 heads west–northwesterly for just over one mile (1.6 km) to reach the western end of Nebraska Spur 26B (S-26B), at a T intersection (east of Concord), having crossed over the Logan Creek Dredge on a truss bridge along the way. (S-26B heads southeast 2.76 miles [4.44 km] to end at Concord.)

East of its junction with S-26B, N-116 curves to head north. After roughly 1.7 miles (2.7 km) N-116 passes along the western edge of the village of Dixon, running along Richardson Street within the community. About a block after entering Dixon, N-116 crosses over two sets of railroad tracks owned by the Nebraska Northeastern Railway.

Beyond Dixon, N-116 continues north for approximately 1.3 miles (2.1 km) to cross 870th Road. Immediately north of 870th Road, N-116 has a gradual jog to the east of about 700 feet (210 m) before resuming it course to the north. About 1.6 miles (2.6 km) farther north N-116 reaches its northern terminus at US 20. (US 20 heads east toward Jackson and South Sioux City, and then on to Sioux City in Iowa. US 20 heads west to Laurel and O'Neill. 577th Avenue continues north from the intersection as a dirt road toward Maskell,)

== History ==
A gravel road from west of Concord to US 20 has been in the state highway system since 1937. By 1948, the road was extended southwest to connect to N-15. The road became designated as N-116 by 1953, two years before the official state highway system was created.

N-116 was resurfaced in bitumen in 1964.

== Major intersections ==
The entire route is in Dixon County.

Location	mi	km	Destinations	Notes
	0.00	0.00	N-15 north – Laurel, Hartington N-15 south – Wayne	Southern terminus; T intersection on the Cedar–Dixon county line
	0.60– 0.63	0.97– 1.01	Truss bridge over the Logan Creek Dredge	
	1.01	1.63	S-26B east – Concord	Western end of S-26B
	6.60	10.62	US 20 east (872nd Road) – Jackson, South Sioux City, Sioux City (Iowa) US 20 west (872nd Road) – Laurel, O'Neill	Northern terminus
	6.60	10.62	577th Avenue north – Maskell	Continuation north from northern terminus (dirt road)
1.000 mi = 1.609 km; 1.000 km = 0.621 mi

== See also ==
- List of state highways in Nebraska
