= Young Elk =

Chief of the Omaha tribe

Young Elk was a leader of the Omaha tribe in the mid-19th-century.

The Diary of Hosea Stout describes him as the son of Big Elk, and says that he was involved in peace negotiations with a group of Mormons regarding return of six stolen horses.

The Government of Nebraska released an article focused on the historical mystery surrounding the date of death for Big Elk. In this publication, there are references to 'Big Elk the Second', with catalogue information indicating that 'Big Elk the Second' and 'Young Elk' are one and the same, describing him as: "a man of natural abilities, but took to dissipating, and died from the effects of [a] prolonged debauch at the foot of Blackbird Hill, and was buried by the grave of Blackbird in 1852."

History also mentions a son of 'Big Elk' named 'Standing Elk'. It is unclear whether this is another name for Young Elk or a sibling.

== See also ==
- Youth
- Elk
