= Logan Creek Dredge =

Coordinates: 42.0916°N 96.6771°W

Logan Creek Dredge Logan Creek, Logan Creek Ditch, New Channel Logan Creek
- Location within Nebraska
- Etymology: Logan Fontenelle

Location
- Country: United States
- State: Nebraska
- Counties: Cedar, Dixon, Thurston, Cuming, Burt, Dodge, Wayne

Physical characteristics
- Mouth: Elkhorn River
- Discharge
  - location: near Uehling
  - average: 237 cu ft/s (6.7 m^{3}/s)

Basin features
- Progression: Elkhorn–Platte–Missouri–Mississippi

Logan Creek Dredge is a canal located in northeastern Nebraska, United States, that roughly follows the natural course of the Logan Creek, but without the many meanders. Some water still flows through much of course of the former creek (and its many meanders). The former course of the creek is referred to as the Old Channel Logan Creek.

== Course ==
The Logan Creek Dredge rises southeastern Cedar County at the confluence of Middle Logan Creek and Perrin Creek, northeast of Laurel. It then flows southeast, passing through or adjacent to the towns of Concord, Wakefield, Pender, Bancroft, Lyons, Oakland, Uehling and Winside. The canal empties into the Elkhorn River in eastern Dodge County, just east of Winslow.

== Name ==
The original Logan Creek was named after Logan Fontenelle, a chief of the Omaha tribe, who was killed by Oglala Sioux in 1855.

== History ==
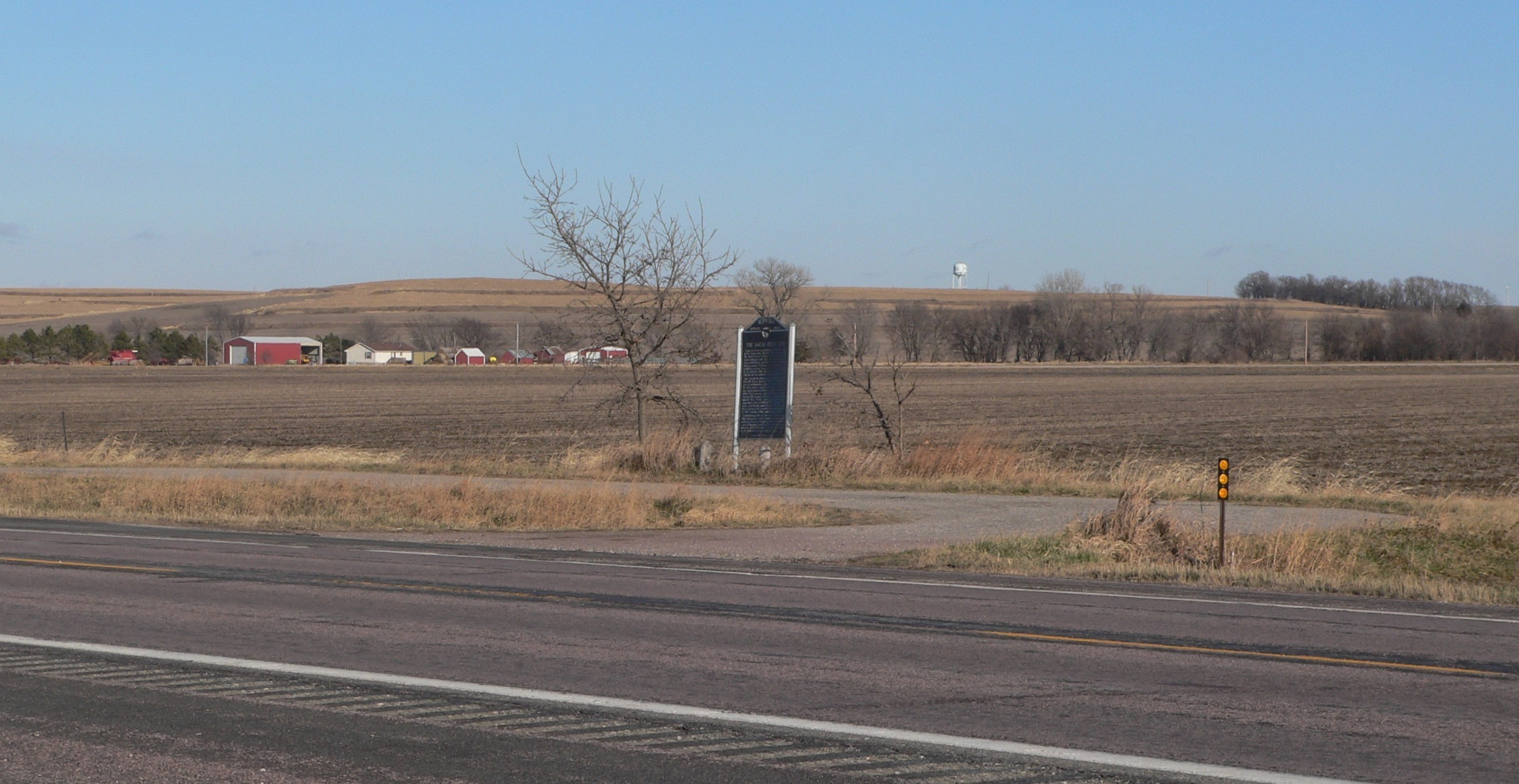
Logan Creek site historical marker, December 2015

=== Logan Creek Site ===
Logan Creek Site is located at Marker 151 on U.S. Route 77, between Uehling and Oakland in Burt County. It is managed by the Nebraska State Historical Society and was entered on the National Register of Historic Places.

=== First European settlers ===
The Aaron Arlington family was in 1857 the first to settle near the present Oakland, which was named after John Oak in 1863.

== See also ==
- List of rivers of Nebraska
