= Petersburg, Nebraska =

Village in Nebraska, US

- Village
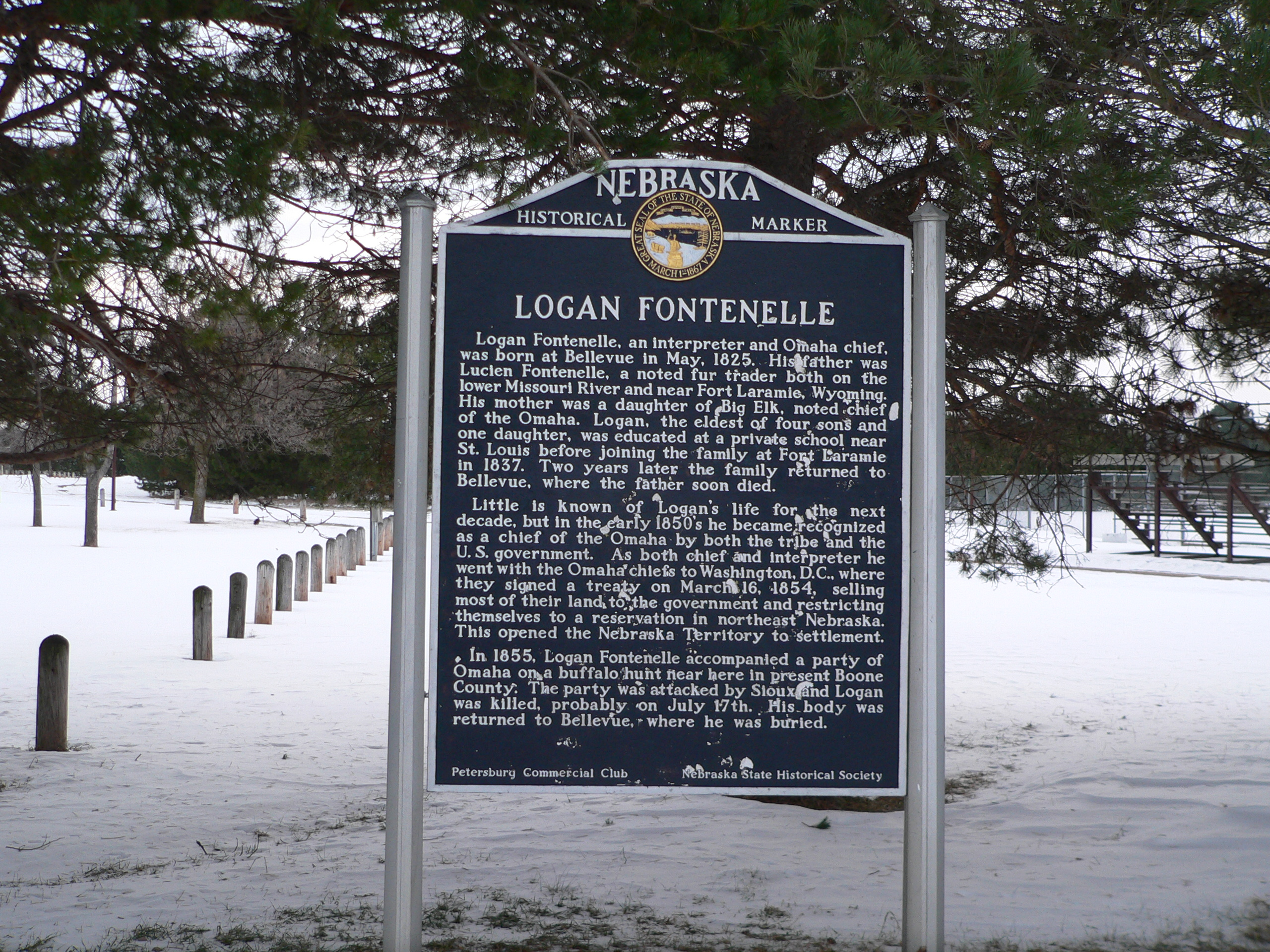
- Historical marker in Petersburg commemorating Logan Fontenelle

- Location of Petersburg, Nebraska
- Coordinates: 41°51′13″N 98°04′52″W
- Country: United States
- State: Nebraska
- County: Boone

Area
  - Total: 0.38 sq mi (0.99 km^{2})
  - Land: 0.38 sq mi (0.99 km^{2})
  - Water: 0 sq mi (0.00 km^{2})
- Elevation: 1,896 ft (578 m)

Population (2020)
  - Total: 332
  - Density: 872.1/sq mi (336.72/km^{2})
- Time zone: UTC-6 (Central (CST))
  - Summer (DST): UTC-5 (CDT)
- ZIP code: 68652
- Area code: 402
- FIPS code: 31-38995
- GNIS feature ID: 2399659
- Website: ci.petersburg.ne.us

Petersburg is a village in Boone County, Nebraska, United States. The population was 332 at the 2020 census. Petersburg is the site of a memorial to Logan Fontenelle, an Omaha chief who was killed nearby, in a skirmish with Brulé and Arapaho in 1855, at the site of the present-day Olson Nature Preserve.

== History ==
Petersburg was platted in 1887 when a branch line of the Chicago and North Western Railway was extended to that point. The community was named for John Peters, the original owner of the town site.

== Geography ==
According to the United States Census Bureau, the village has a total area of 0.37 square miles (0.96 km^{2}), all land.

== Demographics ==
Historical population
Census	Pop.	Note	%±
1900	478		—
1910	533		11.5%
1920	501		−6.0%
1930	585		16.8%
1940	657		12.3%
1950	508		−22.7%
1960	400		−21.3%
1970	370		−7.5%
1980	381		3.0%
1990	388		1.8%
2000	374		−3.6%
2010	333		−11.0%
2020	332		−0.3%
U.S. Decennial Census

=== 2010 census ===
As of the census of 2010, there were 333 people, 145 households, and 94 families residing in the village. The population density was 900.0 inhabitants per square mile (347.5/km^{2}). There were 168 housing units at an average density of 454.1 per square mile (175.3/km^{2}). The racial makeup of the village was 98.8% White and 1.2% from two or more races. Hispanic or Latino of any race were 1.8% of the population.

There were 145 households, of which 24.1% had children under the age of 18 living with them, 58.6% were married couples living together, 3.4% had a female householder with no husband present, 2.8% had a male householder with no wife present, and 35.2% were non-families. 33.1% of all households were made up of individuals, and 20% had someone living alone who was 65 years of age or older. The average household size was 2.30 and the average family size was 2.94.

The median age in the village was 46.2 years. 22.2% of residents were under the age of 18; 7.8% were between the ages of 18 and 24; 18.9% were from 25 to 44; 27.6% were from 45 to 64; and 23.4% were 65 years of age or older. The gender makeup of the village was 49.2% male and 50.8% female.

=== 2000 census ===
As of the census of 2000, there were 374 people, 165 households, and 102 families residing in the village. The population density was 1,013.5 inhabitants per square mile (391.3/km^{2}). There were 183 housing units at an average density of 495.9 per square mile (191.5/km^{2}). The racial makeup of the village was 97.59% White, 1.87% from other races, and 0.53% from two or more races. Hispanic or Latino of any race were 1.87% of the population.

There were 165 households, out of which 28.5% had children under the age of 18 living with them, 51.5% were married couples living together, 6.1% had a female householder with no husband present, and 37.6% were non-families. 37.6% of all households were made up of individuals, and 26.1% had someone living alone who was 65 years of age or older. The average household size was 2.25 and the average family size was 2.97.

In the village, the population was spread out, with 27.3% under the age of 18, 5.1% from 18 to 24, 19.3% from 25 to 44, 20.3% from 45 to 64, and 28.1% who were 65 years of age or older. The median age was 44 years. For every 100 females, there were 86.1 males. For every 100 females age 18 and over, there were 92.9 males.

As of 2000 the median income for a household in the village was $29,688, and the median income for a family was $39,792. Males had a median income of $29,375 versus $21,964 for females. The per capita income for the village was $17,312. About 3.8% of families and 8.8% of the population were below the poverty line, including 3.8% of those under age 18 and 17.1% of those age 65 or over.
