= Logan Fontenelle =

Omaha chief (1825–1855)

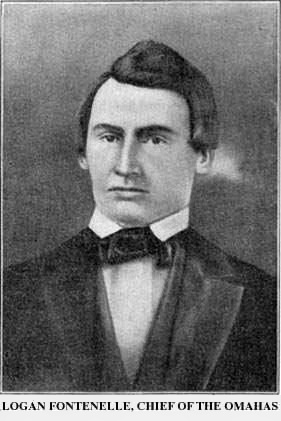
- Preceded by: Big Elk

Personal details
- Born: May 6, 1825 Fort Atkinson
- Died: July 16, 1855 (aged 30) Boone County, Nebraska
- Profession: interpreter

Logan Fontenelle (May 6, 1825 – July 16, 1855), also known as Shon-ga-ska (White Horse), was a trader of Omaha and French ancestry, who served for years as an interpreter to the US Indian agent at the Bellevue Agency in Nebraska. He was especially important during the United States negotiations with Omaha leaders in 1853–1854 about ceding land to the United States prior to settlement on a reservation. His mother was a daughter of Big Elk, the principal chief, and his father was a respected French-American fur trader.

European Americans thought Fontenelle was a chief but, because of his white father, he was not considered part of the tribe. As the Omaha had a patrilineal system, only if he had been formally adopted by a man of the tribe could he have advanced to be a chief. The Omaha considered him a half-breed because of his father, a "white man." Fontenelle lived on the reservation and died at the age of 30. He, along with five other Omaha on a tribal summer buffalo hunting trip, were attacked and killed by an enemy band of Sioux warriors.

Fontenelle acted as an interpreter in Omaha negotiations with the United States during 1853–1854 for land cessions, first in Nebraska, with 60 Omaha leaders and the US Indian agent Gatewood; they came to agreement in January 1854. Later that year, Fontenelle accompanied a delegation of seven gente chiefs of the Omaha who traveled overland to Washington, D.C., for further talks. Fontenelle was one of the signatories of the treaty, perhaps because he was the only Omaha speaker at the meeting who was literate in English. Forced to accept changes to the treaty during that trip, the Omaha chiefs agreed to cede 4,000,000 acres (16,000 km^{2}) of their land to the United States. They believed that at least, they were securing US protection from the Sioux, but were to be disappointed. Within a couple of years, the Omaha removed to a reservation in northeast Nebraska in the Blackbird Hills, essentially present-day Thurston County.

== Biography ==
=== Early years ===
Logan Fontenelle was born at Fort Atkinson, Nebraska Territory on May 6, 1825. He was the oldest son of four born to Me-um-bane, a daughter of the Omaha principal chief Big Elk (1770–1846/1853), and her husband Lucien Fontenelle, a French-American fur trader from New Orleans. Their other children were Albert (1827–1859), Tecumseh (Felix) (1829–1858) (named after the Shawnee chief), Henry (born 1831), and Susan (1833–1897). The senior Fontenelle sent his sons to St. Louis, Missouri, for European-American schooling. His daughter Susan was educated at home with her mother and family, received extended training in the local mission schools, and married Louis Neals.

In 1828, Lucien Fontenelle purchased the former Pilcher's Post, becoming the agent at what became known as Fontenelle's Post. He represented the American Fur Company on the Missouri River in what developed as Bellevue, Sarpy County, Nebraska. In 1832, with the fur trade declining sharply, Fontenelle sold the post to the US government.

It used the complex for the headquarters of the regional Indian agency, called the Upper Missouri Indian Agency or Bellevue Agency. This agency administered relations with the Omaha and other regional tribes. In the following decades, the Indian agent had the lead for negotiating with regional tribes for land cessions to the United States in order to allow sale to American settlers.

=== Return to Nebraska ===
After his father died in 1840, the 15-year-old Logan Fontenelle returned from St. Louis to Nebraska, where he began to work as an interpreter for the US Indian Agent at the Bellevue Agency. He also worked as a trader. Several years later, in August 1846 he acted as an interpreter for Big Elk when he signed an illegal treaty with Brigham Young to allow the Mormon pioneers to create a settlement on Omaha territorial lands. (The United States wanted to be a party to all treaties related to Native American territory.) Not having guns, the tribal leaders were seeking aid from the Mormons for protection from the Sioux, who had been raiding them. They likely thought it a bad deal in the end, as the Mormons consumed many of their local resources and did little to protect them.

In the spring of 1843 Logan took Gixpeaha ("New Moon,") a woman of the Omaha, as his wife. He had a house built near his father's for him and Gixpeaha. They had three daughters: Emily, born mid-winter 1845; Marie, born December 21, 1848; and Susan, born February 8, 1850. Sometime in 1846 while staying at Logan's home, Father Christian Hoecken baptized Gixpeaha and baby Emily, then "solemnized their marriage." During Christmas of 1850 Father Hoecken, back in Bellevue on a missionary errand, baptized Marie and Susan.

Fontenelle allied with the future Omaha chief Joseph La Flesche (1822–1888), a Métis fur trader who had been adopted as a son of the principal Omaha chief Big Elk. About 1848, the Omaha removed to the Bellevue Agency. By that time designated by Big Elk as his successor, LaFlesche brought his family to settle with the tribe.

About this time, LaFlesche and Fontenelle established a ferry across the Platte River near the present-day site of Columbus, Nebraska, to accommodate the increasing migrant traffic. Later, they started another ferry across the Elkhorn River near Fremont, Nebraska. After making a profit, they sold the ferries to English immigrants.

In the summer of 1854 a group of town site promoters from Quincy, Illinois, arranged for Fontenelle to select a location for their new colony. He took them to a location overlooking the Elkhorn River about forty miles northwest of Bellevue. The men asked Fontenelle the price for twenty square miles of land for their township and his reply was a hundred dollars; however, he lowered the price when the promoters decided to name the town and a nearby creek in honor of him. This town was incorporated March 14, 1855; unfortunately "the good people of Quincey were innocent of correct French pronunciation [Font-nel, ] uttered the name as a three-syllable word, and came down heavily on the second syllable." The creek was called Logan.

=== Treaty negotiations ===
The US Indian Agent James M. Gatewood had been under pressure by the government to gain a land cession from the Omaha. In turn, they wanted protection by the US government against the Sioux, who made frequent raids on them, and economic means to ensure their future. In January 1854, 60 Omaha leaders met in council to discuss the treaty; they were reluctant to delegate so important a matter even to their gente chiefs. Together, the large group of men negotiated a treaty with the US Indian Agent Gatewood. Fontenelle acted as the interpreter. The treaty included provision for payments of tribal debts to the traders Fontenelle, Louis Saunsouci, and Peter Sarpy.

The Omaha finally designated seven chiefs: Joseph LaFlesche (Iron Eye), Two Grizzly Bears, Standing Hawk, Little Chief, Village Maker, Noise, and Yellow Smoke to represent them and accompany Gatewood to Washington to conclude the negotiations, but authorized little room for changes. Fontenelle and Saunsouci went with the chiefs as interpreters. Joseph LaFlesche had been designated by Big Elk as his successor and in 1853 had become chief of the Wezhinshte gens. Both he and Fontenelle signed the Treaty of 1854, together with five gente chiefs, whereby the tribe sold nearly all its land to the government. Fontenelle may have signed in place of one of the other chiefs because he was literate in English.

The reservation was established on land in the Blackbird Hills, comprising present-day Thurston County. The terms were changed by the Bureau of Indian Affairs to be less favorable than those negotiated by Gatewood and the 60 Omaha in Nebraska. Among the changes: Omaha were to receive considerably less money for their land, and the President was to have the discretion to distribute the annuities in cash or goods, rather than all in cash as the Omaha wanted. Payments were to be made until 1895.

About 800 Omaha removed to the reservation, and their number increased over the following decades to 1100 in 1881. Under the treaty terms, the Omaha tribe received "$40,000 per annum for three years from January 1, 1855; $30,000 per annum for the next succeeding ten years; $20,000 per annum for the next succeeding fifteen years; and $10,000 per annum for the next succeeding twelve years," to 1895. The President of the United States, based on recommendations by the US Indian Office (and the agent in the field, who had the most authority in the matter), was to determine the proportions of the annuity to be received in money and in goods.

=== Death ===
In 1855 a band of Brulé Sioux killed and scalped Fontenelle and five of his party, who were part of the Omaha summer buffalo hunt, along Beaver Creek in the present-day Olson Nature Preserve in Boone County, Nebraska. John Bigelk, nephew of Big Elk, described the Sioux attack: "They killed the white man, the interpreter, who was with us." As the historian Melvin Randolph Gilmore has noted, Big Elk called Fontenelle

"a white man because he had a white father. This was a common designation of half-breeds by full-bloods, just as a mulatto might commonly be called a [black] by white people, although as much white as black by race."

Because the tribe was patrilineal, it considered children's social identity to be determined by that of the father.

Iron Eyes (Joseph LaFlesche) account of Fontenelle's death states:

"Logan could have made a dash like I did, but he laid down in the grass and attempted to fight the Sioux alone. His first shot missed, but with the second he killed a Sioux. The Sioux thought that there were two men there, and those in the front halted. Another party of about a dozen made a charge on him from behind. Logan had reloaded his gun, and as they came up he turned and killed two of them. The party that were in front dashed in before he could reload and killed and scalped him."

When the battle with the Sioux was over, the survivors found Fontenelle's remains, and Louis Saunsouci carried the body back to camp. It was wrapped in buffalo robes and placed on a travois pulled by Fontenelle's horse (recovered from the Sioux during battle.) Having sent messengers ahead, they traveled back to Bellevue.

An eyewitness account of the funeral reports that

"a procession...moved slowly along, led by Louis San-so-see [sic], who was driving a team with a wagon, in which, wrapped in blankets and buffalo robes was [Logan Fontenelle]. On either side the Indian chiefs and braves, mounted on ponies, with the squaws and relatives of the deceased, expressed their grief in mournful outcries. His remains were taken to [his] house...a coffin was made which proved to small without unfolding the blankets...he had been dead so long it was a disagreeable task. After putting him in the coffin his [squaws] who witnessed the scene, uttered the most piteous cries, cutting their ankles until the blood ran in streams. An old Indian woman...standing between the house and the grave, lifted her arms to heaven and shrieked her maledictions upon the heads of the murderers. Col. Sarpy, Stephen Decatur, Mrs. Sloan, and an Otoe half-breed, and others stood over the grave when his body was lowered. While Decatur was reading the...funeral service of the Episcopal church, he was interrupted by Mrs. Sloan, who stood by his side and in a loud voice told him 'that a man of his character ought to be ashamed of himself to make a mockery of the Christian religion by reading the solemn service of the church."

Decatur had read the funeral service due to the absence of clergy. He proceeded until the end. "After the whites, headed by Col. Sarpy, had paid their last respects, the Indians filed around the grave and made a few demonstrations of sorrow." Another account states that after the white mourners had left, the Indians had their own oratory and chanted funeral songs into the night.

After Logan died, his widow Gixpeaha went to live on the Omaha reservation, where she lived to old age. Their daughters Marie and Susan married Omaha men and raised families. His eldest daughter Emily was not married when she died in 1869.

== Chiefdom dispute ==
Some historians contend that Fontenelle was made a chief of the Omaha in 1853 after the death of Big Elk. This assertion is contradicted by Big Elk having designated Joseph LaFlesche as his successor. In addition, contemporary accounts say that Fontenelle was respected, but only the whites thought he was a chief. They were the only ones to commemorate him with honors after his death.

It appears confusion arose because he accompanied the chiefs to Washington, D.C., as an interpreter. The Bureau of Indian Affairs (BIA) also used Saunsouci as an interpreter. For some reason, the officials included Fontenelle's name as one of the seven chiefs on the treaty, which he signed, but the name of chief Two Grizzly Bears was not included, nor did he sign. Fontenelle was the only one of the group of Omaha speakers who was literate in English and could read what was on the treaty. Boughter suggests that Gatewood may have represented him to the BIA officials as a chief, or the Omaha did to increase his stature. He may also have been recognized as an honorable chief because of "charitable acts" and gifts to the tribe.

An 1889 sketch of Joseph LaFlesche in the Bancroft Journal said he was the only chief of the Omaha to have had any European blood; as noted, he was adopted as a son by Big Elk, which was the way he fully entered the tribe. Although A. T. Andreas called Fontenelle the "last great chief" of the Omaha in his 1882 history of Nebraska, the assertion of chieftainship is not supported by the evidence of tribal structure and contemporary views provided in 1919 by Melvin R. Gilmore, curator of the State Historical Society of North Dakota, and by the 20th-century historian Judith Boughter. It appears that only the whites thought Fontenelle was a chief in his own lifetime and during the decades after his death. As Gilmore noted, the Omaha had a tribal structure that had patrilineal hereditary leadership; because children belonged to their father's gens, there was no place in the tribe for a child fathered by a European or American, unless the person was officially adopted by a male of the tribe.

Dr. Charles Charvat reports in his work a passage from The Omaha Tribe that "on account of business and governmental interferences, two classes of chiefs developed in Indian tribes : one class was called regular chiefs, because they had attained their position through inheritance or through adoption by a former chief; and a second class was known as 'paper chiefs,' because they usually had some document assuring them official and extra-tribal favor...it is likely that [Logan Fontenelle] had acquired titular and other influence as the United States interpreter, and then through personal effort and natural ability attained prestige which made him a de facto chief."

== Legacy ==
Fontenelle is honored in the names of several places, and with a monument:

- Fontenelle Forest in Bellevue
- Fontanelle in Washington County, Nebraska
- Fontanelle in Adair County, Iowa
- Logan Creek (Omaha "Taspóⁿhi báte wachʰíshka") a stream flowing through Cedar, Dixon, Thurston, Cuming, Burt, and Dodge counties in Nebraska.
- Fontenelle Boulevard in Omaha was originally intended to take drivers to the town of Fontanelle, Nebraska.
- Early 1900s, Hotel Fontenelle, a grand hotel in Omaha.
- Logan Fontenelle Housing Project, Omaha
- The Fontenelle Elementary School, Omaha, and the Logan Fontenelle Middle School, Bellevue.
- A monument was erected to Logan Fontenelle in Petersburg, Nebraska, near the site of his death.
- Fontenelle Park at the intersection of Fontenelle Boulevard and Ames Avenue in North Omaha.
