= Blackbird Bend =

Omaha tribal land in Iowa, U.S.

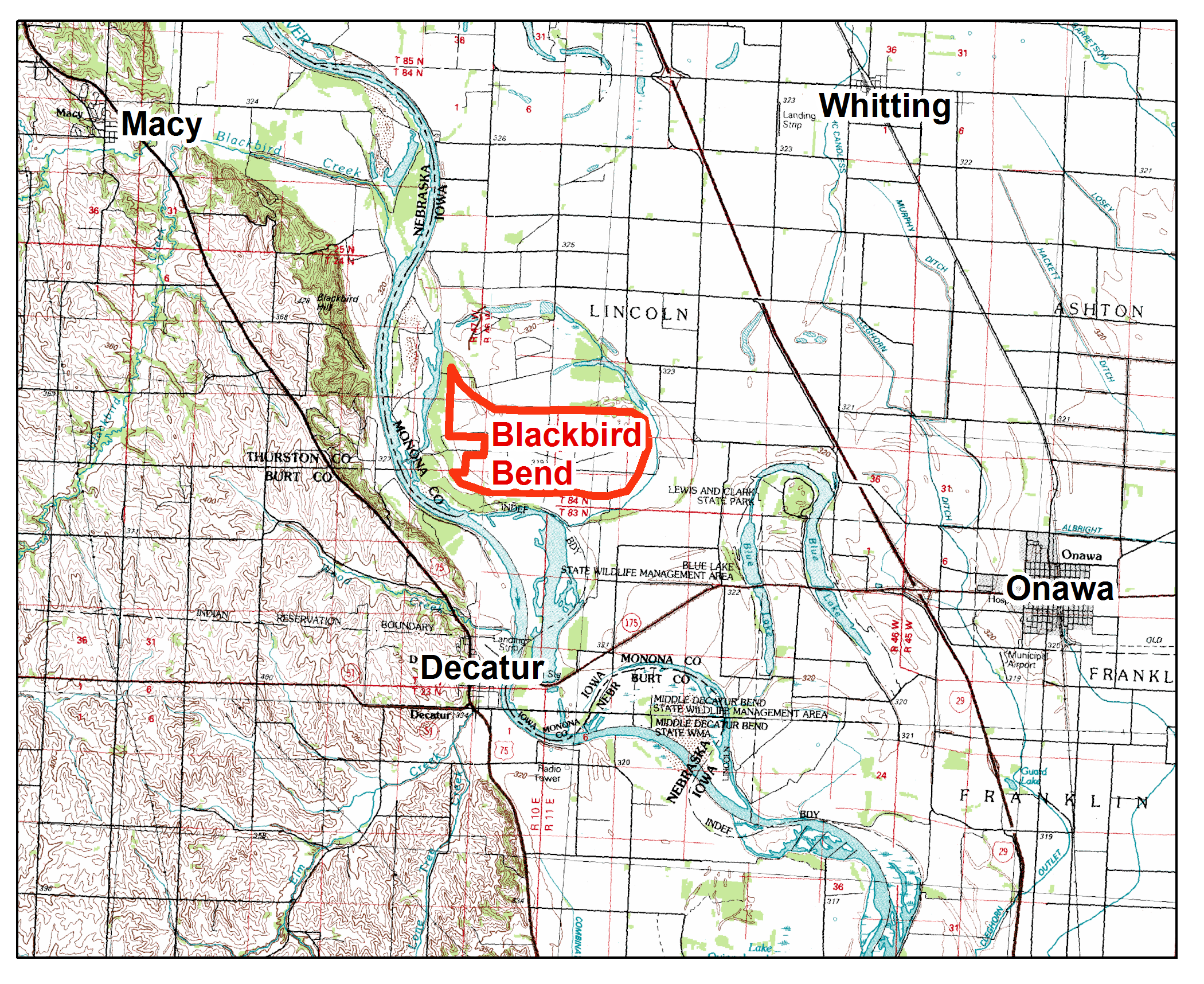
Blackbird Bend Omaha tribal lands, Monona County, Iowa.

Blackbird Bend is the name for areas in western Iowa along the Missouri River in Monona County, Iowa that have been claimed by the Omaha tribe of Nebraska and Iowa near Onawa, Iowa. The area is named for Chief Blackbird, an Omaha leader of the late 18th century. After lengthy court battles and several standoffs beginning in the 1960s, much of the area has been recognized as part Omaha tribal lands. The Blackbird Bend Casino is located on this reclaimed territory.
