= Olson Nature Preserve =

Nature preserve in Boone County, Nebraska

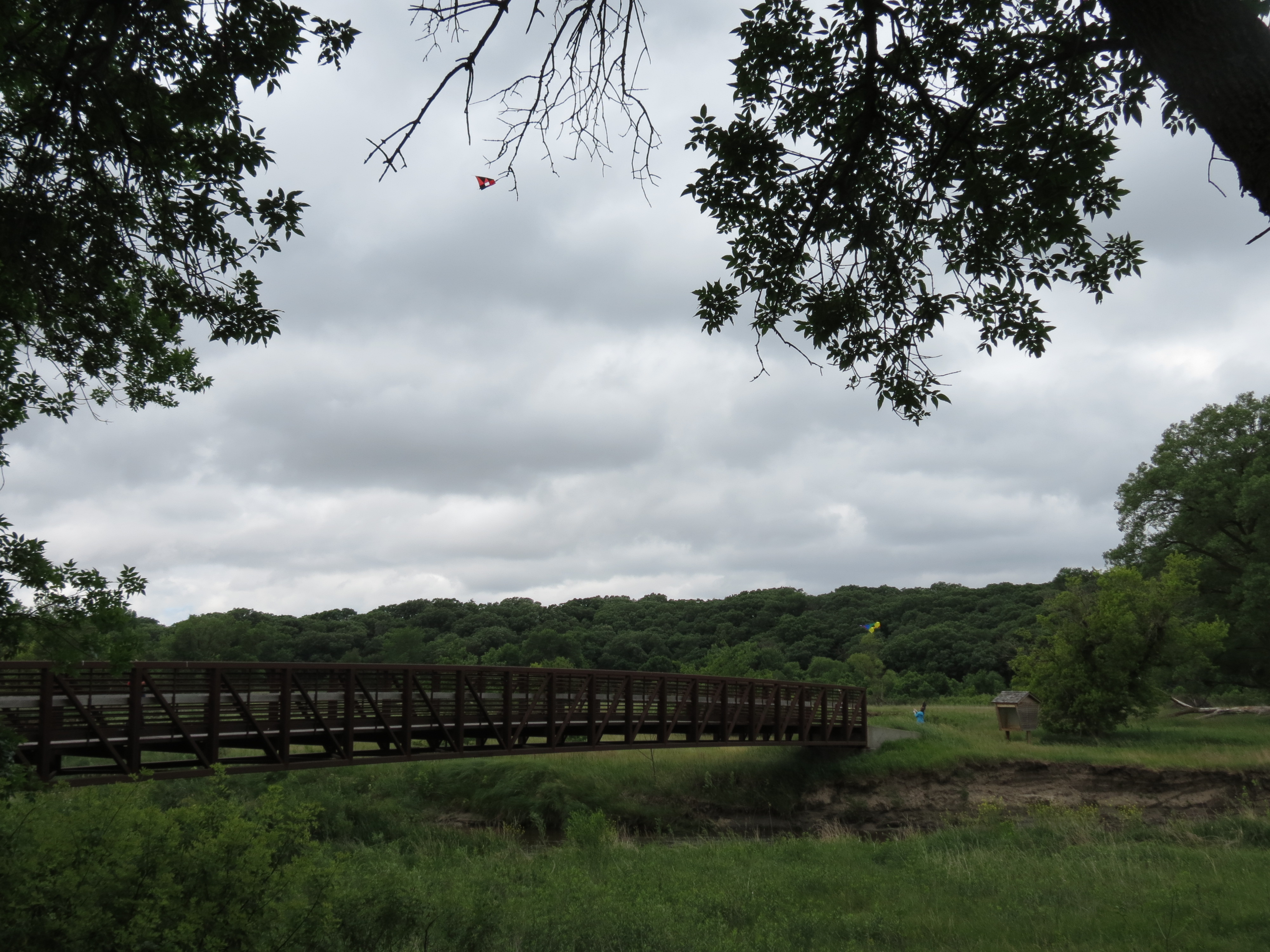
- Footbridge at Olson Nature Preserve

- Location within Nebraska
- Location: Boone County, Nebraska, United States
- Nearest city: Petersburg, Nebraska; Albion, Nebraska
- Coordinates: 41°47′59.8″N 98°6′15.9″W
- Area: 112 acres (45 ha)
- Established: 1995
- Governing body: Prairie Plains Resource Institute

The Olson Nature Preserve is a nature preserve in Boone County, in east-central Nebraska. It is located on Beaver Creek, between the towns of Albion and Petersburg. The preserve covers 112 acres (45 ha).

The preserve serves for both education and recreation. It is used by local people as an outdoor classroom for studies about natural science, local history, agriculture, and the arts; and as a recreational area providing views of the Sandhills prairie, meadows, cottonwoods, oxbow wetlands, lowland tall grass, oak forest and the loess hills by Beaver Creek.

== History ==
A farm couple, Grant and Bernice Olson, owned the Olson Nature Preserve. Having survived the drought and Depression of Boone County, the Olsons developed a successful cattle business with over 1,200 acres (490 ha) of pasture and farm ground. Over the years they allowed their land to be used by scouts and other people who liked the outdoors. The Olsons had no children, so when they died, they left their land to the Girl and Boy Scout regional councils, to the nearby town of Albion's public school system, and to a local health care organization. In 1992, a group of Boone County citizens requested that the Beaver Creek site of the Olson property be set aside for public use. A feasibility study of the development potential of a natural resources laboratory on this land was directed by Albion citizen Norm Smith and Boy Scouts Scoutmaster Quentin Mortensen, suggesting the need for an outdoor classroom.

In 1995, the Prairie Plains Resource Institute, centered in Aurora, Nebraska, took ownership of the property, agreeing to provide annual maintenance needs. Representatives of the Prairie Plains Resource Institute, educators, and community members have since then developed procedures and policies in regards to the care and upkeep of the preserve.

== Geography ==
The Olson Nature Preserve lies at the easternmost tip of the Nebraska Sandhills, and includes a half-mile stretch of Beaver Creek. A variety of ecosystems occur within the preserve, including a Sandhills rangeland area, native hardwood forest (oak and cottonwood), an oxbow wetland area, Beaver Creek and adjacent features, lowland pasture, and a sandy blowout canyon.

The preserve's closely placed ecosystems give educators and visitors a variety of species, plants, and animals to observe. The oak woodlands contain old oaks standing on their roots two to three feet in the air due to sand erosion, while the loess hills contain a source of clay matching pots from an excavated native American village in the area. Beaver Creek is shallow enough for wading during the summer, allowing aquatic plants, fish, and turtles to be observed. The diversity of habitats in the floodplain of the preserve provide for a diversity of bird species including bald eagles, snakes, and small and large mammals. Hiking trails leading up to the ridge of the oak escarpment provide a lookout point of the preserve's terrain.

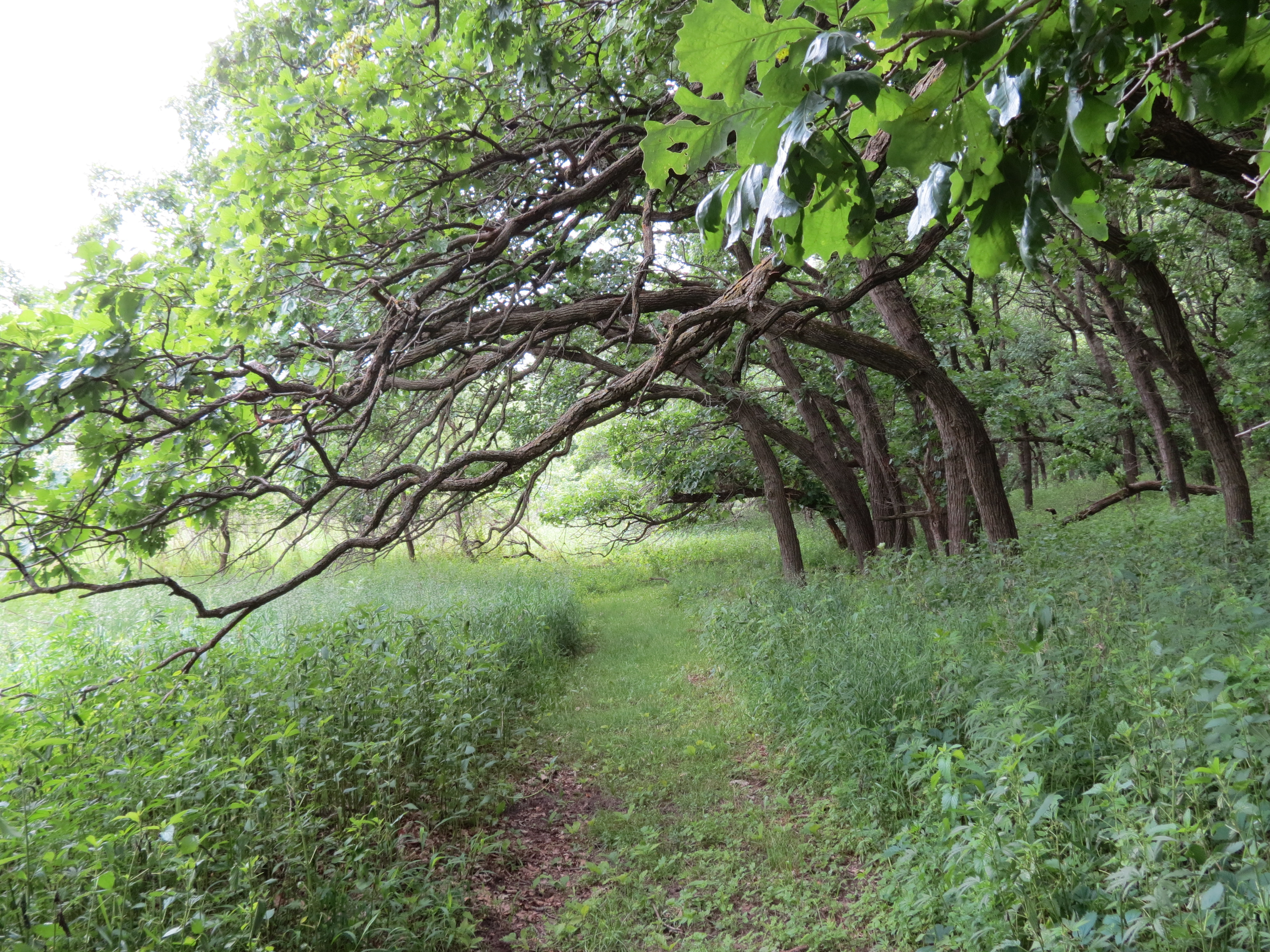
One of the trails at Olson Nature Preserve, near the oak grove.

== Improvements ==
Improvements at the preserve include a footbridge over Beaver Creek, trails, benches, portable restrooms, a kiosk, and a shelter. Prairie Plains members, locals, and Boy Scout groups often gather together for work days, performing such tasks as clearing fallen timber, mowing the grass paths, and clearing dead trees for controlled burns.

== Additional Information ==
During the 1800s, the site of the Olson Nature Preserve was considered prime summer hunting grounds for Nebraska Indians such as the Omaha and the Sioux tribes. Due to drought in 1855, as well as promises of a year's worth of food supply not met or kept by the United States government, summer buffalo hunts were often planned. In August 1855, an Omaha hunting party, including Chief Logan Fontenelle, made their way to the Boone County area in Nebraska in search of game. Camped on the banks of Beaver Creek, Fontenelle was caught away from camp and attacked in the hills of Olson Nature Preserve by a Sioux war party. According to author Mari Sandoz, Fontenelle, a well-known and respected trader of French and Omaha descent, was killed near Beaver Creek.

Educators at Boone Central High School, located in Albion, developed an annual summer enrichment program at the Olson Nature Preserve that is now offered every May. Targeting Boone County's middle school students, Boone Central educators use the preserve to conduct theater workshops, to teach photography, and to lead students in such activities as throwing boomerangs and flying kites, making insect traps, using GPS, cooking outdoors, and studying nearby Orford Pioneer Cemetery graves.

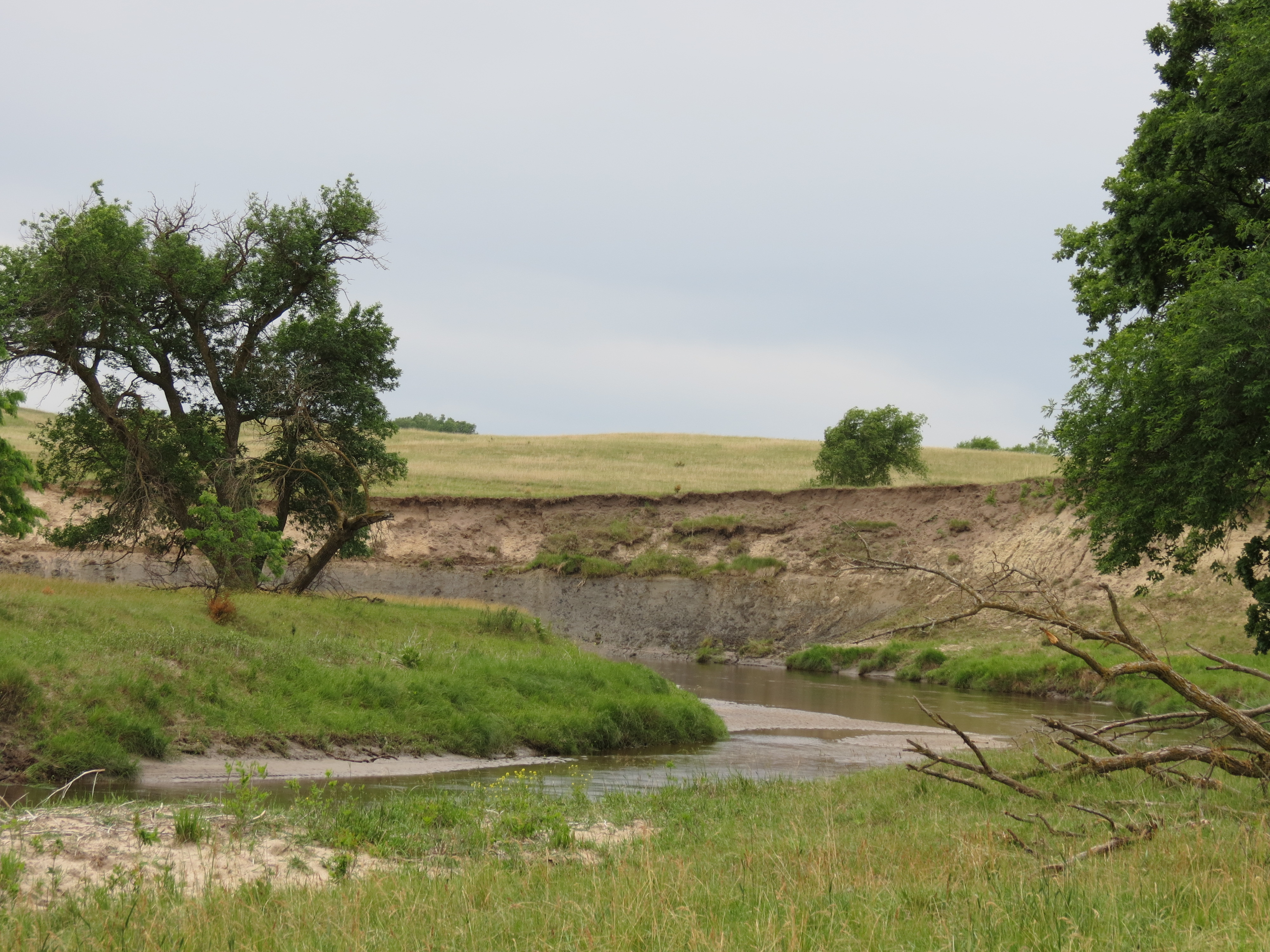
A view of Beaver Creek at Olson Nature Preserve.

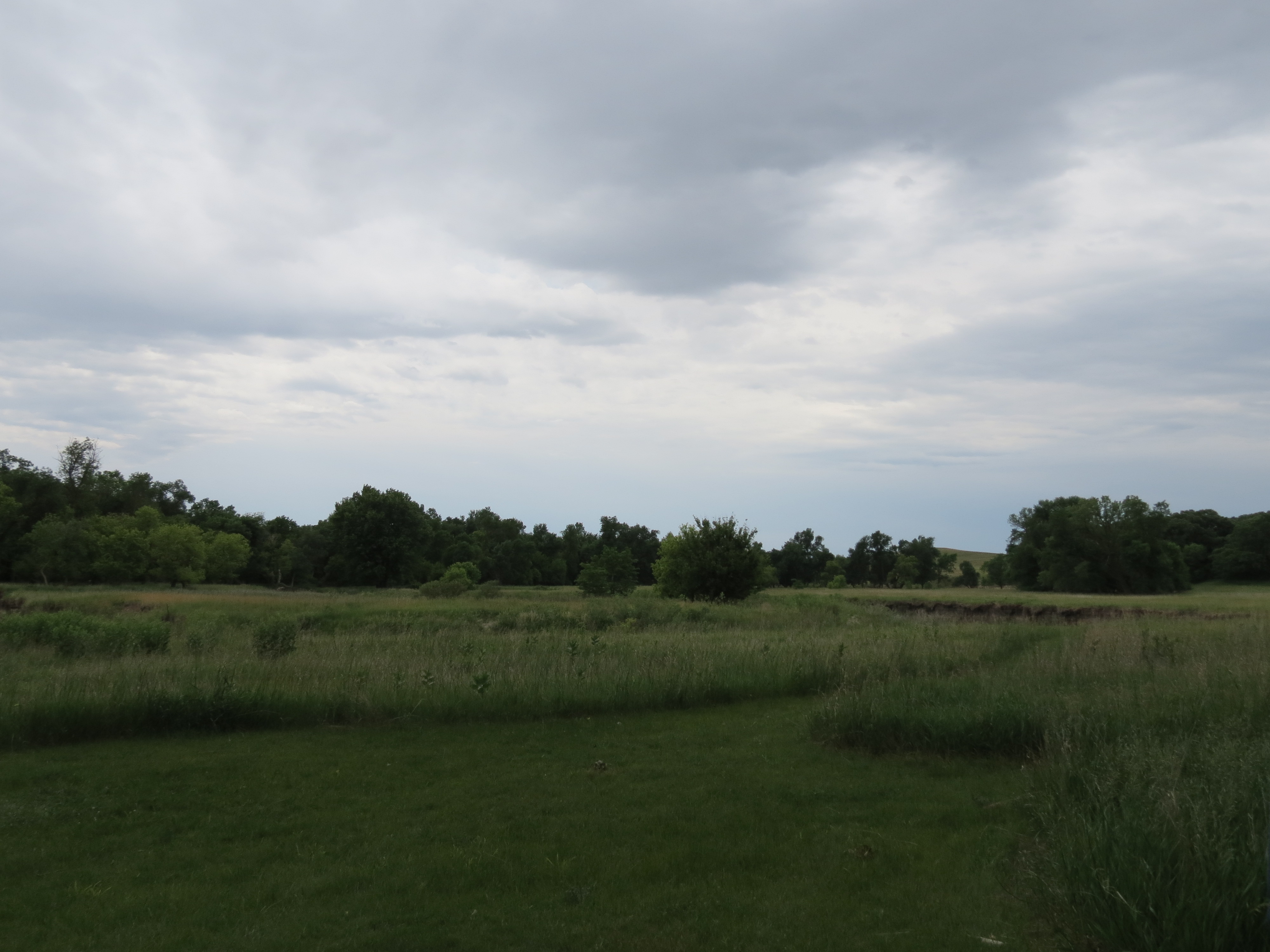
View of the Olson Nature Preserve—the low grass and Beaver Creek.
