= Big Elk =

Principal chief of the Omaha tribe

- Ontopanga
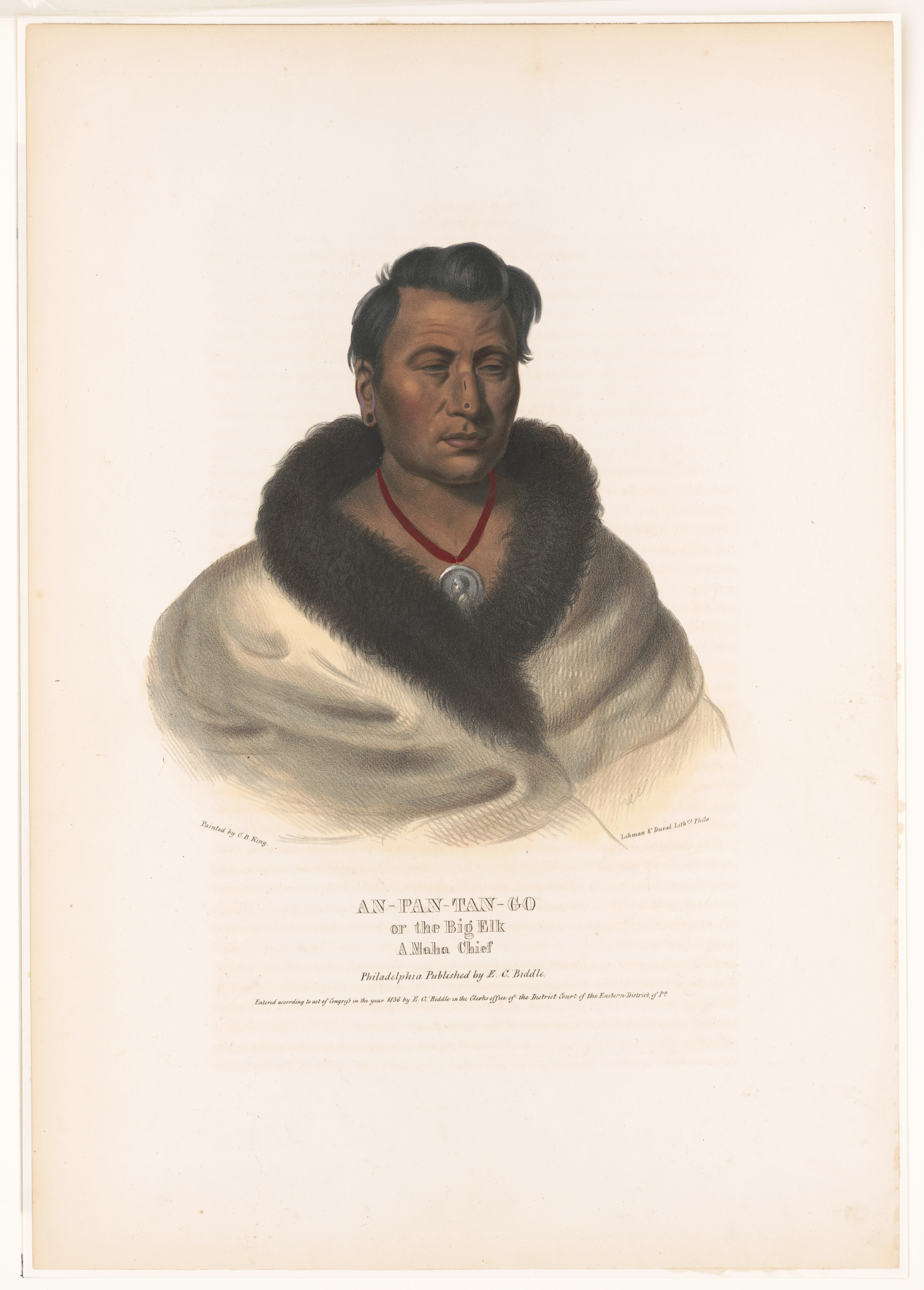
- A print of Big Elk
- Born: 1765-1775
- Died: 1846-1848
- Resting place: Bellevue Cemetery
- Known for: A chief of the Omaha Indians, warrior, orator
- Successor: Joseph LaFlesche
- Children: Standing Elk (son); Mitain(daughter); Meumbane(daughter)

Big Elk, also known as Ontopanga (1765/75–1846/1848), was a principal chief of the Omaha tribe for many years on the upper Missouri River. He is notable for his oration delivered at the funeral of Black Buffalo, the maternal grandfather of Crazy Horse, in 1813.

Big Elk led his people during a time of increasing changes, with threats from Sioux warfare, disease, and European-American encroachment. He created alliances to protect his people and prepare for a future that he thought depended on a closer relationship with the United States. He was willing to exchange land for the promise of protection for his people but was often disappointed by the failures of the US government.

== History ==
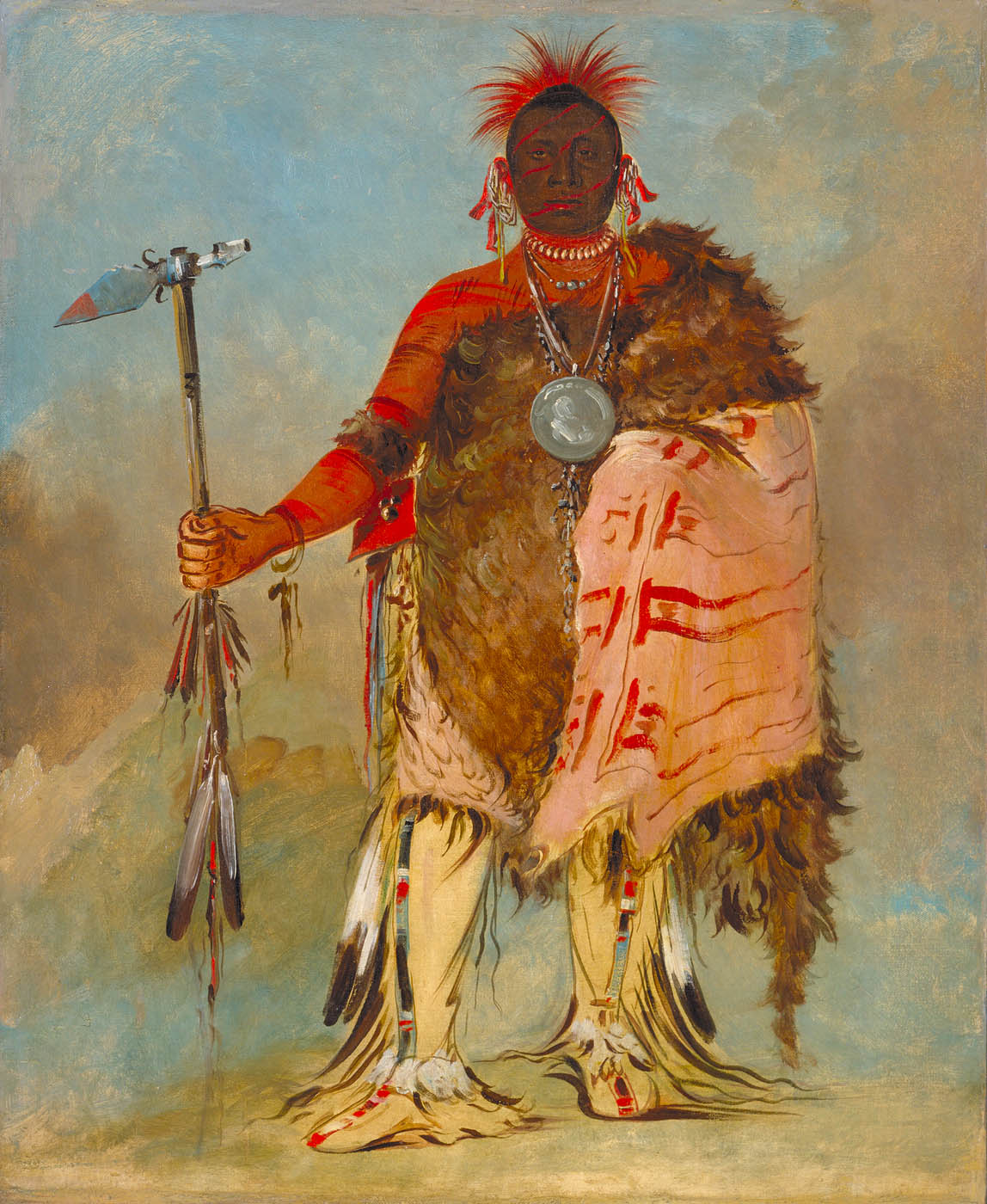
Chief Big Elk by George Catlin, 1832

Big Elk struggled to protect his people from encroachment by European Americans, but more importantly, from warfare by the Sioux. The Omaha suffered from smallpox epidemics in the early nineteenth century and were decimated because of poor immunity to the European introduced disease and also because of sporadic immunisation programmes to the indigenous peoples, even though they were most at risk. Big Elk was among the Native American allies of the United States during the War of 1812, through his relations with the French Creole trader Lucien Fontenelle from New Orleans, who served as an interpreter. The chief also was seeking United States aid for protection against the Sioux.

Big Elk admired some aspects of European-American culture and made strategic alliances through the marriages of his daughters: two married prominent European-American fur traders. His mixed-race grandson Logan Fontenelle worked with the US Indian agent as interpreter for the Omaha from the age of 15. As the Omaha had a patrilineal kinship system, Logan Fontenelle was not considered to belong to the tribe because his father was white, a man of French-American ancestry from New Orleans. The Omaha classified Fontenelle as a white man.

In 1843 Chief Big Elk had designated his adopted son Joseph LaFlesche as his successor; LaFlesche was a Métis fur trader of Ponca and French-Canadian descent, who lived for many years with the Omaha. Highly assimilated to the tribe, as Big Elk taught him its culture and the role of chief, LaFlesche served as principal chief from 1853/1855-1888. He was one of the six chiefs who signed the 1854 treaty with the US that ceded the last major portions of Omaha land. He encouraged the Omaha to become educated and to adopt some European-American ways.

Logan Fontenelle was increasingly important to the Omaha after 1853, serving as interpreter during their negotiations for land sales. Fontenelle served as interpreter to the chiefs in Washington, DC, during negotiation of their last treaty. He was one of the seven signatories to the 1854 treaty, perhaps because he was the only Omaha speaker who was fluent in English. Under this treaty, the Omaha ceded most of their land to the United States in exchange for annuities and goods. The whites considered Fontenelle a chief but, as noted above, the Omaha did not even consider him to be a member of the tribe. In 1855, he was killed by members of an enemy Sioux band while out hunting with Omaha men.

== Marriage and family ==
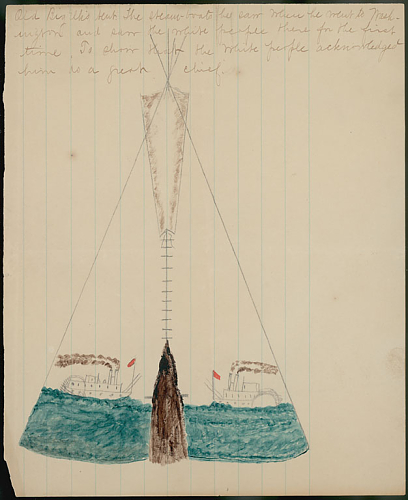
Ledger drawing by an Omaha man named George Miller of chief Big Elk's tipi. It was decorated with two painted river steam boats to symbolize his friendship with the Euro-Americans and his importance as a chief

Big Elk was married to an Omaha woman. They had a son Standing Elk and several daughters, including Mitain and Me-um-bane.

As with many other Native American tribes, the Omaha were used to absorbing captives, orphans and honored allies into their culture as adopted members. Similarly, Big Elk arranged or permitted two of his daughters to marry prominent European-American fur traders, with whom he wanted to make alliances to strengthen his family's connections. He admired some aspects of American culture and believed he could help his people by these alliances.

In 1814, during the War of 1812 between the United States and Great Britain, his daughter Mitain (also spelled Mitahne) married Manuel Lisa, recently appointed by the governor of the Missouri Territory as the US Indian agent on the Upper Missouri River. He had been a prominent fur trader in the Omaha territory for years, setting up Fort Lisa in what is now North Omaha, Nebraska. Lisa returned to the fur trade after the war's conclusion. Mitain was what was known as his "country wife", and they lived together when he wintered in the Omaha territory. At the time, Lisa was legally married to a European-American woman in St. Louis, where she lived full-time. After her death in 1817, he married a second woman of European descent in St. Louis.

Lisa and Mitain had a daughter Rosalie and son Christopher together. In 1819 Lisa took Rosalie back to St. Louis with him for Catholic schooling, but Mitain refused to give him custody of Christopher. She was supported in this by Big Elk.

About 1823–24, Big Elk's daughter Me-um-bane married the fur trader Lucien Fontenelle, from a wealthy French Creole family in New Orleans. He set up a trading post on the Missouri River near what is now Bellevue, Nebraska and lived full-time in the territory. They had five children together. Their first son Logan Fontenelle was born in 1825. He became an interpreter for the Omaha, beginning to work for the US Indian agent after his father's death in 1840. Some historians contend that the younger Fontenelle was elected a chief of the Omaha in 1853; he was documented as serving as interpreter to the chiefs during the negotiations for land sales that were taking place. While 60 Omaha chiefs had held council to negotiate with the Agent Greenwood in January 1854, Fontenelle accompanied a delegation of seven chiefs who went to Washington, DC later that year to complete negotiations for a treaty with the United States. He was one of two interpreters and the only one of the Omaha speakers to be literate in English. The Omaha ceded most of their land in exchange for annuities and goods, and resettlement on a reservation in what is now northeastern Nebraska.

Big Elk formally adopted the trader Joseph LaFlesche as his son, thus incorporating him into the Omaha. (His mother Waoowinchtcha was a Ponca and reported as a relative of Big Elk.) LaFlesche was the son of Joseph LaFlesche, a French-Canadian fur trader with the American Fur Company, who had worked for many years with the Omaha and other nations between the Platte and the Nebraska rivers. The younger LaFlesche had started accompanying his father on trading trips at age 10, and began working for the AFC at age 16. In 1843 Big Elk designated LaFlesche as his successor, and LaFlesche seriously studied the tribal ways and customs to prepare for chieftainship. LaFlesche appeared to join the tribal council about 1849, after he had settled with the Omaha at the Bellevue Agency. LaFlesche was highly assimilated and cultured, and married Mary Gale, daughter of an American surgeon and his Iowa wife. LaFlesche served as principal chief of the Omaha from 1855 to 1888. During this period of major transition after the tribe moved to a reservation, he encouraged the Omaha to become educated in English, to accept Christianity, and to adopt some European-American ways. He and Mary encouraged education for their children, and several went to school and college in the East. They became prominent reformers and leaders among the Omaha: one of the daughters became the first Native American woman physician, another became an activist and reformer for Omaha rights, and a third became financial manager for the tribe. After Mary's death about 1855, LaFlesche married Tainne, an Omaha woman. Their son Francis La Flesche (born 1857) also became educated. He worked as an ethnologist for the Smithsonian Institution in a close partnership with the anthropologist Alice Fletcher; he wrote books and research about the Omaha and the Osage, and helped preserve their traditions.

== See also ==
- Young Elk
