= Blackbird Hill =

Burial site of Omaha Chiefs in Nebraska, USA

- U.S. National Register of Historic Places
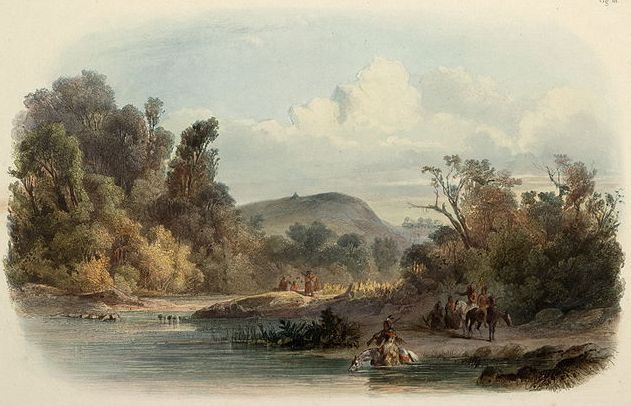
- Painting by Karl Bodmer

- Location within Nebraska Location within the United States
- Location: Off U.S. Route 75 southeast of Macy, Anderson Township, Thurston County, Nebraska
- Coordinates: 42.08°N 96.30°W
- Area: 47 acres (19 ha)
- NRHP reference No.: 79001456
- Added to NRHP: May 2, 1979

Blackbird Hill, about three miles south of Macy, Nebraska, also known as Big Elk Hill, is a historic site which was listed on the National Register of Historic Places in 1979.

It was a traditional burial site of Omaha chiefs, including Blackbird The site was visited by Lewis and Clark in 1804. It includes petroglyphs. It is on private land and is not open to the public.

It was painted by George Catlin and by Karl Bodmer.

== Popular culture ==
Blackbird Hill, particularly in Nebraska, may be associated with lost love due to it being the setting of a folktale which was popular in the early twentieth century. One account of the story was recorded in Nebraska Folklore, a pamphlet printed in 1939 as part of the Work Projects Administration's Nebraska Writers' Project.

According to the 1939 story, on a fall day in the mid-eighteenth century, members of the Omaha tribe happened upon a white man wandering their territory who was "raving mad and nearly starved." The Omaha took the man to their medicine man, who nursed the man back to health. After regaining his strength and sanity, the man decided to return to his home in the eastern United States, but first told his benefactors the story of how he had fallen into such despair. The man had been shipwrecked for five years while returning from a business venture abroad. The girl whom he had planned to marry eventually lost hope that he would ever return and instead married the man's childhood friend.

When the man returned home and learned of this, he set out to find his sweetheart, whom he assumed had moved west with her new husband to California in search of gold. When he could not find her in California, he began his journey home, heartbroken. On his return voyage, he sailed down the Missouri River and one evening landed at the foot of Blackbird Hill, where he saw a trail which he followed up the hill to a cabin. He knocked on the door and, to his surprise, his sweetheart answered. The two declared their love for each other and the woman promised to leave with him the next day.

The woman's husband returned shortly after and she told him she planned to leave him. The husband begged the woman to stay, but she would not. Mad with rage, the husband took his hunting knife from his pack and killed his wife, nearly decapitating her with the knife. Then the husband, upon realizing what he had done, gathered up his wife in his arms and carried her to a cliff on the hill. The husband flung both himself and his wife's body down the cliff into the waters of the Missouri. The man from the east had been nearby but could not stop the tragedy and instead was struck with shock upon witnessing the horrors and could not tell the Omaha anything that had happened between that night and the day he was rescued. The man returned home, but never forgot about the horrors he had seen on Blackbird Hill. The Omahas never forgot the story either, and it is said that in October, when the moon is full, one can still hear the screams of the woman on Blackbird Hill and that no grass grows where her blood was shed.

The tale is almost certainly the invention of white authors and not a story told by the Omaha, as the Omaha would have already known the site well for being the burial place of Chief Blackbird, rather than the place where two unnamed Europeans died. There are, at least in the 1939 telling, a number of historical inaccuracies. For instance, the story claims that the man found wandering the area was taken to the tribe's medicine man and placed in his wigwam. The Omaha built permanent settlements out of earth lodges and temporary housing in the form of tipis, but wigwams were not a customary form of housing for the Omaha. Furthermore, the author alleges the story took place in the mid-eighteenth century, which would place the events around 1750. In the 1750, Chief Blackbird had not yet died and been buried on Blackbird Hill. The United States was not a sovereign nation in this time period, and even after the signing of the Treaty of Paris in 1783, there was not contact between citizens of the United States and the Omaha tribe in the 1700s. While other Europeans, such as the French and Spanish, had been in contact with the Omaha since at least 1700, the American citizens did not interact with the Omaha tribe until the Corps of Discovery in 1804. The author may have confused the term eighteenth century to mean the 1800s, which is likely given that the story claims that the man went looking for his lover in California because he believed she had gone there following a gold rush, which likely refers to the 1849 California Gold Rush.
