= Blackbird (Omaha leader) =

Omaha Indian tribal chief

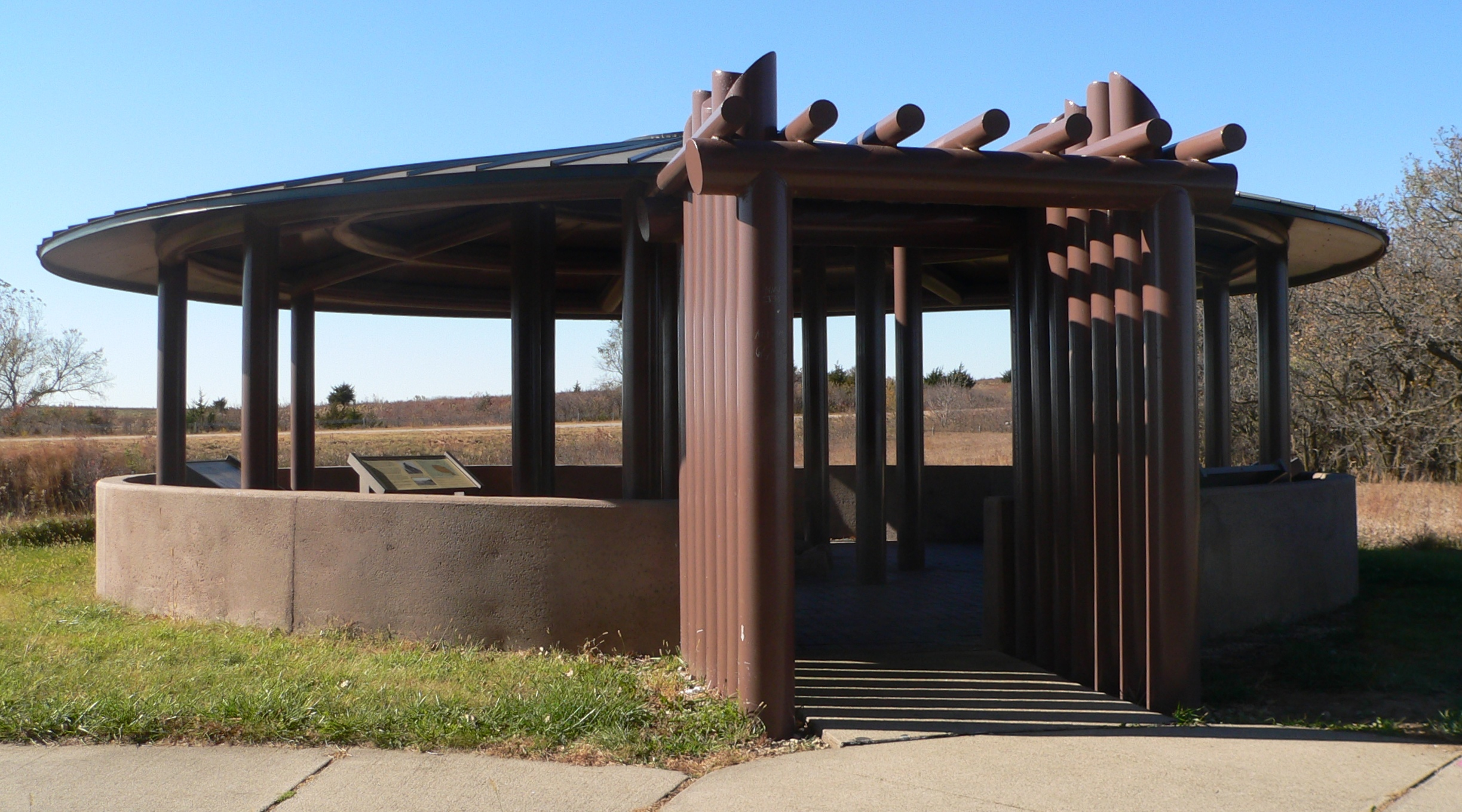
An overlook beside U.S. Highway 75 in Burt County, Nebraska is named after Blackbird; the interpretive shelter resembles a traditional Omaha lodge.

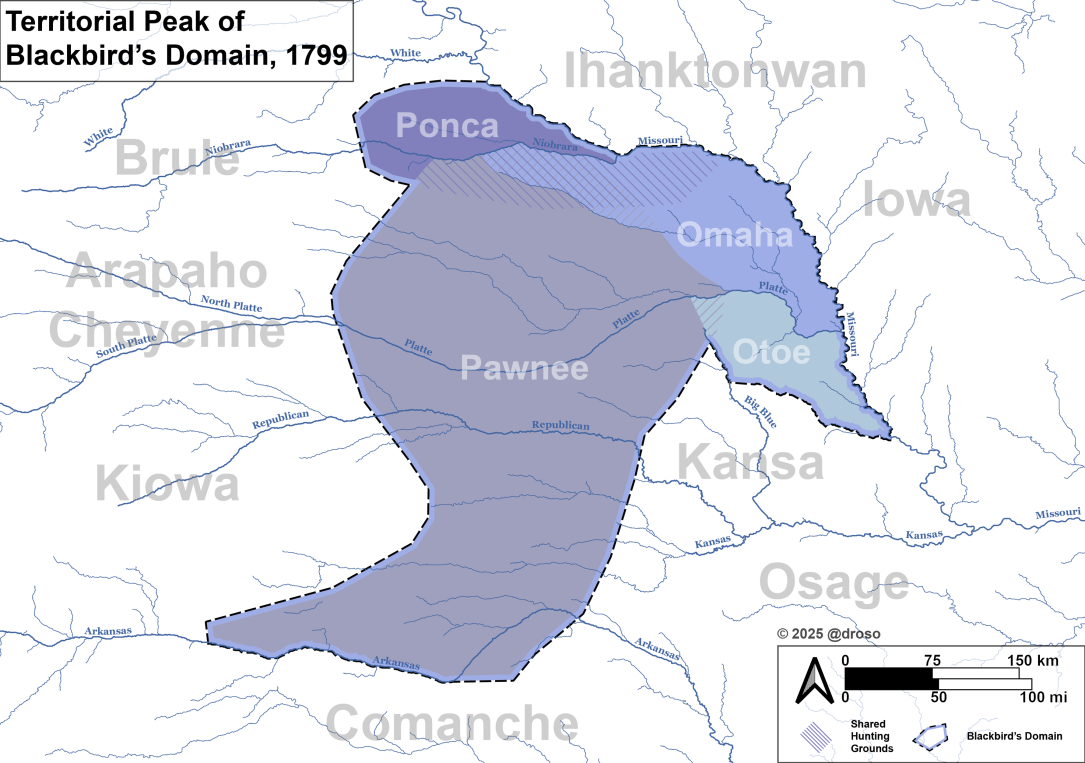
BlackBird’s Domain at its peak in 1799, shortly before his death.

Chief Blackbird (Wash-ing-guh Sah-ba) (ca. 1750 – 1800) was the leader of the Omaha Native American tribe who commanded the trade routes used by Spanish, French, British and later American traders until the late 18th century. He was one of the first of the Plains Indian chiefs to trade with white explorers and also believed to be the first of the Plains Indian chiefs to openly question white encroachment. Blackbird used trade as a means to prosperity for his people and as a way to ensure white explorers were aware that they were the guests. The Omaha were not warlike people, yet they were the first on the Great Plains to have mastered equestrianism around 1770 and were at one point, while Chief Blackbird was alive, the most powerful Indian tribe in the Great Plains.

Chief Blackbird died during a smallpox epidemic in 1800. In 1804, the Lewis and Clark Expedition members were led to Chief Blackbird's burial site, which sits on a bluff on the west side of the Missouri River, in present-day Nebraska.

Blackbird Bend in western Iowa is named for Blackbird.
