= Melvin Randolph Gilmore =

American anthropologist

Melvin Randolph Gilmore (11 March 1868 – 25 July 1940) was an American anthropologist and ethnobotanist. He is known for his work on Native American anthropological manuscripts, particularly the Pawnee people, and served as the Curator of Ethnology, Museum of Anthropology at the University of Michigan. He is known for prominent works such as Uses of Plants by the Indians of the Missouri River Region (1919) and Indian Lore and Indian Gardens (1930).

== Early life ==
Melvin Gilmore was born in Valley, Nebraska, to John R. Gilmore and Mary Louisa Concannon on March 11, 1868. He worked as a farmer and a teacher before eventually earning a Bachelor of Arts in Botany from Cotner University in 1904. He earned his Master's Degree (1909) and PhD (1914) in the same field from the University of Nebraska.

== Career ==
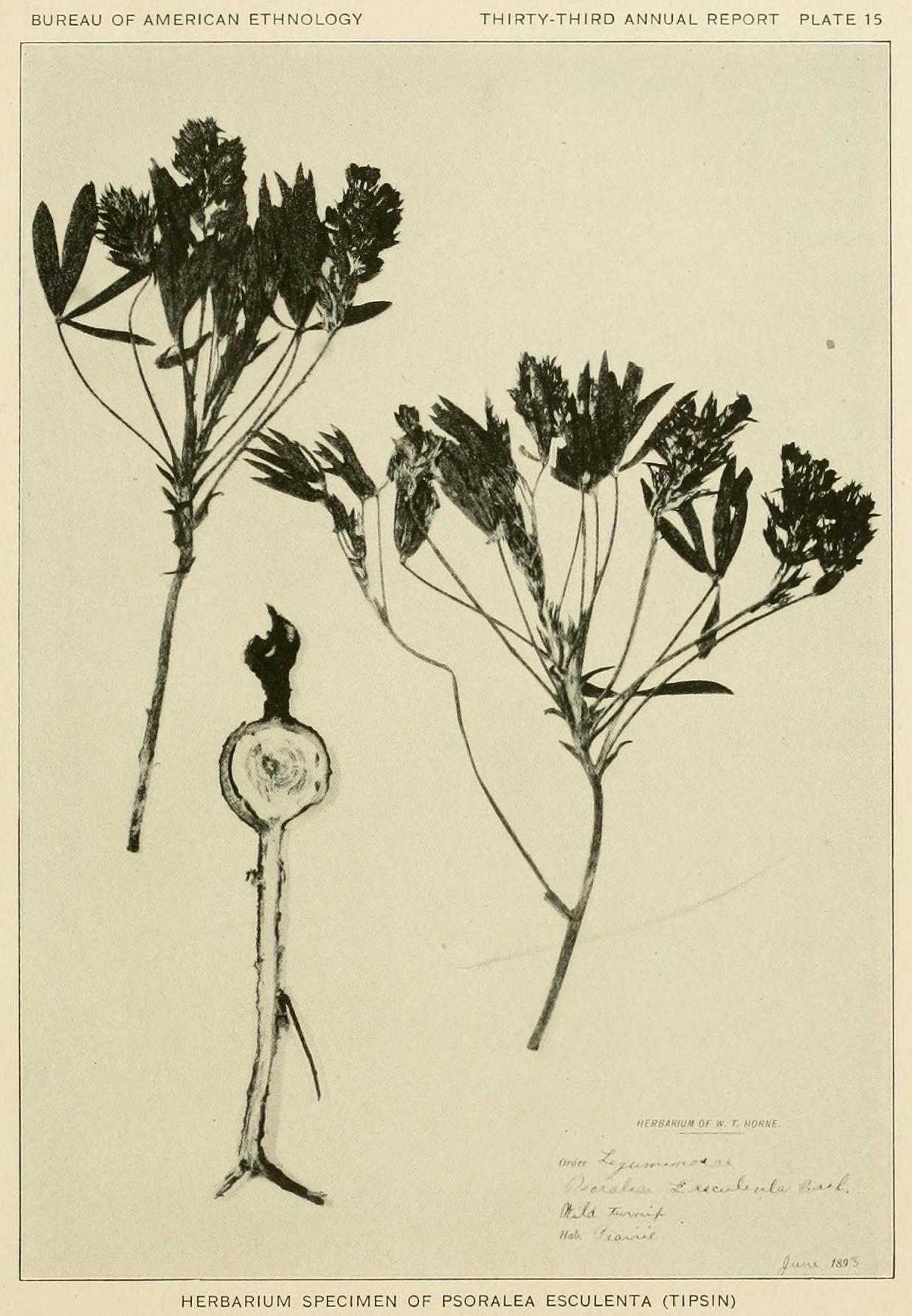
Specimen of Pediomelum esculentum, or prairie turnip, for Gilmore's “Uses of plants by the Indians of the Missouri River Region.”

Gilmore began his professional career as a professor of Biological Science at Cotner University in 1905. He left his role to become a curator with the Nebraska State Historical Society in 1911, where he served for 5 years. As curator, Gilmore studied the ethnobotany of Native Americans, focusing on Pawnee traditions and botany. He shifted organizations several times, from the North Dakota State Historical Society in 1916, the Museum of the American Indian in 1923, and finally to the Museum of Anthropology at the University of Michigan in 1929, where he became the Curator of Ethnology.

In 1930, Gilmore founded the Ethnobotanical Laboratory at the University of Michigan, which was used to study the botany of Indigenous groups in the Great Plains area. Before becoming the director of the laboratory, he established a comparative collection of plant samples. He published details of the laboratory's founding as well as his thoughts on the importance of ethnobotany in his work, The Ethnobotanical Laboratory at the University of Michigan (1932).

== Bibliography ==
- Uses of Plants by the Indians of the Missouri River Region (1919)
- Indian Lore and Indian Gardens (1930)
- The Ethnobotanical Laboratory at the University of Michigan (1932)
