= Concord, Nebraska =

Village in Dixon County, Nebraska, United States

- Village
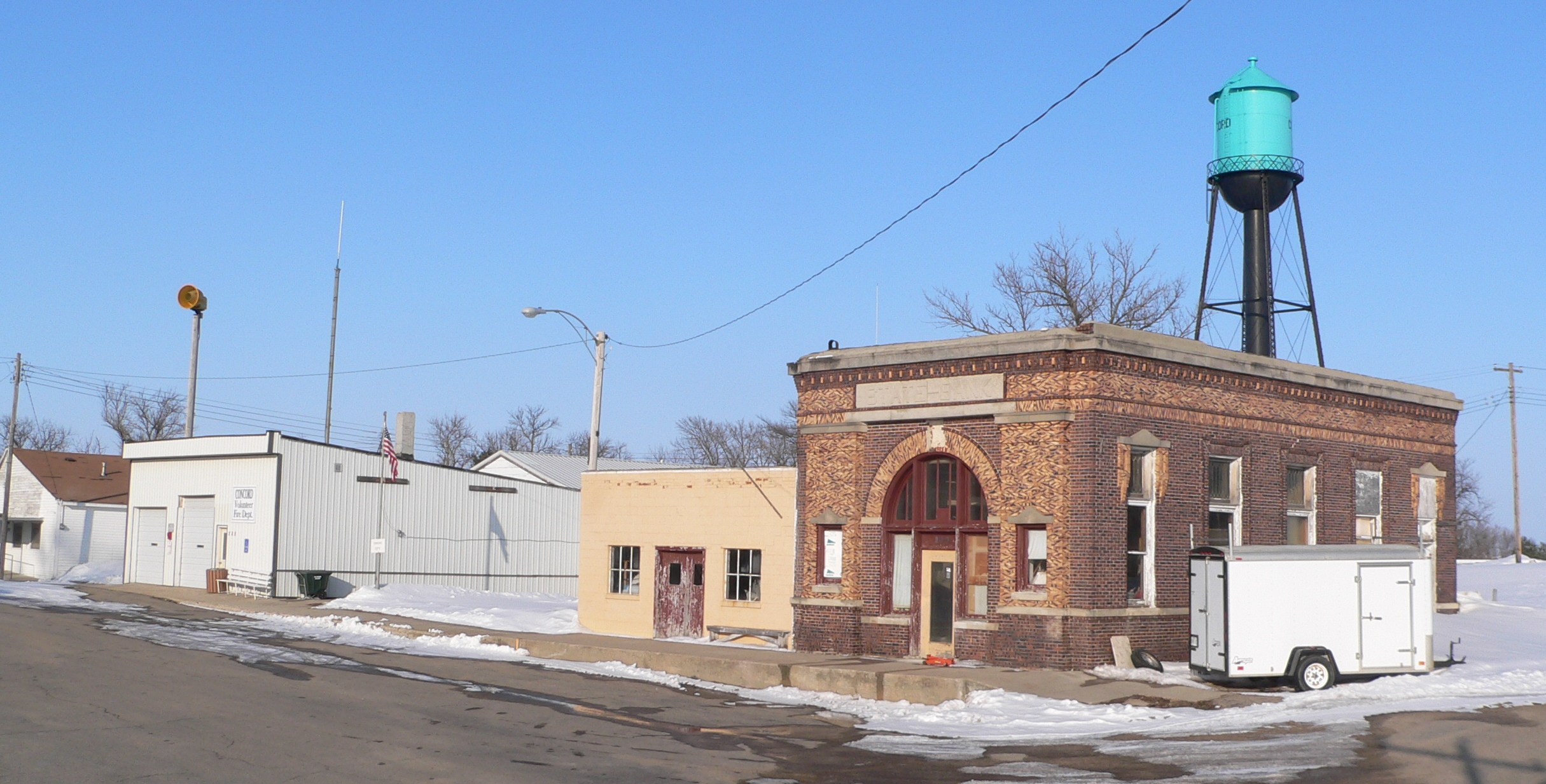
- Downtown Concord: Lincoln Street north of State Street, February 2010

- Location of Concord, Nebraska
- Coordinates: 42°23′02″N 96°59′21″W
- Country: United States
- State: Nebraska
- County: Dixon

Area
  - Total: 0.13 sq mi (0.34 km^{2})
  - Land: 0.13 sq mi (0.34 km^{2})
  - Water: 0 sq mi (0.00 km^{2})
- Elevation: 1,450 ft (440 m)

Population (2020)
  - Total: 126
  - Density: 953.0/sq mi (367.97/km^{2})
- Time zone: UTC-6 (Central (CST))
  - Summer (DST): UTC-5 (CDT)
- ZIP code: 68728
- Area code: 402
- FIPS code: 31-10250
- GNIS feature ID: 2398613

Concord is a village in Dixon County, Nebraska, United States. It is part of the Sioux City, IA–NE–SD Metropolitan Statistical Area. As of the 2020 census, Concord had a population of 126. There are two churches located in town: Concordia Lutheran Church and The Free Evangelical Church. It also hosts the Dixon County Fair on the eastern edge of town.

== History ==
In 1878, Swedish immigrants mostly from the Essex, IA area, moved this way after the extension of the railroad from Sioux City. Concord was platted in 1883 soon after the Chicago, St. Paul, Minneapolis and Omaha Railway was extended to that point. The real reasoning behind its name is unknown. Old Timers said that it was named by a wife of a railroad worker who thought the area was quiet and peaceful. It may also be named after the Battle of Concord of the American Revolutionary War. The wife of the president of the railroad may have named it after a bridge in Massachusetts. Early immigrants of Concord were predominately of Lutheran Religious backgrounds as the Catholics settled in nearby Dixon. The sale of Alcohol has never been permitted in city limits. Farming was the main source of income for many nearby residents, but the town has boasted a lumber yard, barber shop, grocery store, cafe, blacksmith, bank, auto shop, gas station and hotel. Concord High School closed in 1958. Their mascot was the Vikings in commemoration of their Swedish roots.

== Demographics ==
Historical population
Census	Pop.	Note	%±
1910	198		—
1920	261		31.8%
1930	257		−1.5%
1940	242		−5.8%
1950	194		−19.8%
1960	150		−22.7%
1970	180		20.0%
1980	145		−19.4%
1990	156		7.6%
2000	160		2.6%
2010	166		3.8%
2020	126		−24.1%
U.S. Decennial Census

=== 2010 census ===
At the 2010 census there were 166 people, 62 households, and 47 families in the village. The population density was 1,276.9 inhabitants per square mile (493.0/km^{2}). There were 67 housing units at an average density of 515.4 per square mile (199.0/km^{2}). The racial makeup of the village was 95.8% White, 0.6% African American, 3.0% Native American, and 0.6% from two or more races. Hispanic or Latino of any race were 6.6%.

Of the 62 households 35.5% had children under the age of 18 living with them, 67.7% were married couples living together, 6.5% had a female householder with no husband present, 1.6% had a male householder with no wife present, and 24.2% were non-families. 21.0% of households were one person and 6.4% were one person aged 65 or older. The average household size was 2.68 and the average family size was 3.04.

The median age in the village was 40 years. 32.5% of residents were under the age of 18; 2.3% were between the ages of 18 and 24; 22.8% were from 25 to 44; 30.1% were from 45 to 64; and 12% were 65 or older. The gender makeup of the village was 50.0% male and 50.0% female.

=== 2000 census ===
At the 2000 census there were 160 people, 65 households, and 43 families in the village. The population density was 1,247.6 inhabitants per square mile (481.7/km^{2}). There were 70 housing units at an average density of 545.8 per square mile (210.7/km^{2}). The racial makeup of the village was 98.75% White, and 1.25% from two or more races. Hispanic or Latino of any race were 4.38%.

Of the 65 households 36.9% had children under the age of 18 living with them, 58.5% were married couples living together, 7.7% had a female householder with no husband present, and 33.8% were non-families. 32.3% of households were one person and 13.8% were one person aged 65 or older. The average household size was 2.46 and the average family size was 3.16.

The age distribution was 29.4% under the age of 18, 8.8% from 18 to 24, 26.9% from 25 to 44, 18.8% from 45 to 64, and 16.3% 65 or older. The median age was 34 years. For every 100 females, there were 86.0 males. For every 100 females age 18 and over, there were 79.4 males.

The median household income was $36,875, and the median family income was $39,286. Males had a median income of $26,250 versus $15,893 for females. The per capita income for the village was $13,783. About 4.5% of families and 10.8% of the population were below the poverty line, including 15.1% of those under the age of eighteen and 8.3% of those sixty five or over.

== Geography ==
According to the United States Census Bureau, the village has a total area of 0.13 square miles (0.34 km^{2}), all land.

=== Climate ===
Climate data for Concord, Nebraska (1991−2020 normals, extremes 1957−present)
Month	Jan	Feb	Mar	Apr	May	Jun	Jul	Aug	Sep	Oct	Nov	Dec	Year
Record high °F (°C)	71 (22)	75 (24)	89 (32)	95 (35)	104 (40)	107 (42)	107 (42)	104 (40)	100 (38)	96 (36)	82 (28)	69 (21)	107 (42)
Mean maximum °F (°C)	52.6 (11.4)	57.2 (14.0)	73.8 (23.2)	83.2 (28.4)	90.1 (32.3)	95.6 (35.3)	94.8 (34.9)	93.2 (34.0)	90.1 (32.3)	85.1 (29.5)	69.2 (20.7)	53.7 (12.1)	97.7 (36.5)
Mean daily maximum °F (°C)	30.6 (−0.8)	34.9 (1.6)	48.1 (8.9)	61.2 (16.2)	72.5 (22.5)	81.6 (27.6)	85.3 (29.6)	83.7 (28.7)	77.1 (25.1)	63.8 (17.7)	47.9 (8.8)	34.7 (1.5)	60.1 (15.6)
Daily mean °F (°C)	19.9 (−6.7)	23.7 (−4.6)	36.2 (2.3)	47.7 (8.7)	59.5 (15.3)	70.1 (21.2)	73.7 (23.2)	72.1 (22.3)	63.6 (17.6)	50.6 (10.3)	36.1 (2.3)	24.1 (−4.4)	48.1 (8.9)
Mean daily minimum °F (°C)	9.3 (−12.6)	12.5 (−10.8)	24.3 (−4.3)	34.2 (1.2)	46.4 (8.0)	58.6 (14.8)	62.1 (16.7)	60.5 (15.8)	50.1 (10.1)	37.3 (2.9)	24.4 (−4.2)	13.4 (−10.3)	36.1 (2.3)
Mean minimum °F (°C)	−16.1 (−26.7)	−11.5 (−24.2)	−0.4 (−18.0)	17.1 (−8.3)	30.9 (−0.6)	46.2 (7.9)	49.5 (9.7)	46.1 (7.8)	33.4 (0.8)	18.6 (−7.4)	2.8 (−16.2)	−8.8 (−22.7)	−18.4 (−28.0)
Record low °F (°C)	−32 (−36)	−32 (−36)	−24 (−31)	−4 (−20)	21 (−6)	36 (2)	38 (3)	37 (3)	22 (−6)	7 (−14)	−19 (−28)	−28 (−33)	−32 (−36)
Average precipitation inches (mm)	0.64 (16)	0.99 (25)	1.58 (40)	2.79 (71)	4.00 (102)	4.57 (116)	3.09 (78)	3.51 (89)	2.94 (75)	2.47 (63)	1.28 (33)	0.96 (24)	28.82 (732)
Source: NOAA

== See also ==
- List of municipalities in Nebraska
