= Laurel, Nebraska =

- City
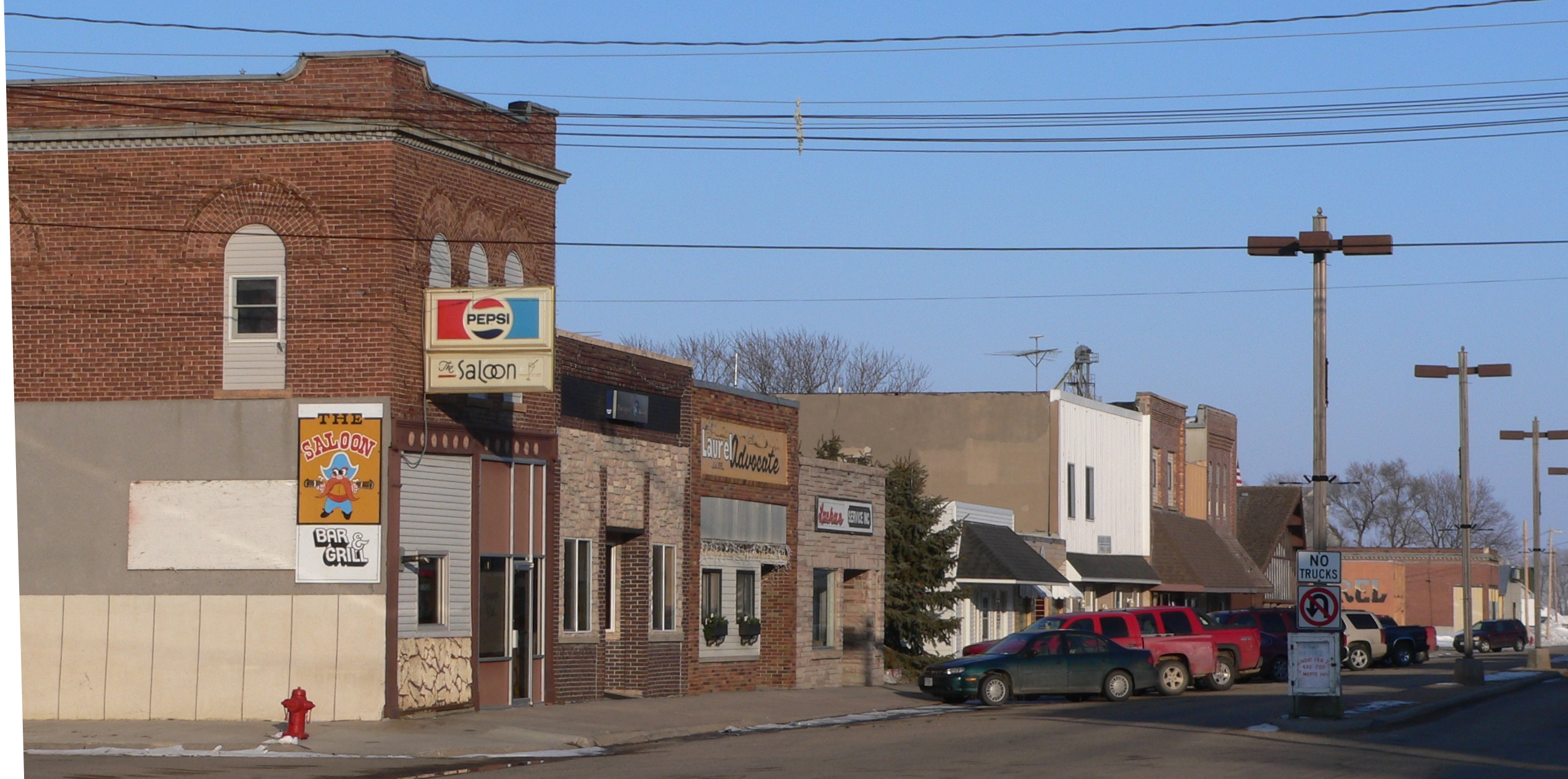
- Downtown Laurel looking east from 2nd and Elm St. prior to the Downtown Revitalization Project finished in 2021.

- Location of Laurel, Nebraska
- Coordinates: 42°25′44″N 97°05′49″W
- Country: United States
- State: Nebraska
- County: Cedar

Government
  - Mayor: Keith Knudsen

Area
  - Total: 1.35 sq mi (3.50 km^{2})
  - Land: 1.35 sq mi (3.50 km^{2})
  - Water: 0 sq mi (0.00 km^{2})
- Elevation: 1,493 ft (455 m)

Population (2020)
  - Total: 972
  - Estimate (2021): 968
  - Density: 718.4/sq mi (277.37/km^{2})
- Time zone: UTC-6 (Central (CST))
  - Summer (DST): UTC-5 (CDT)
- ZIP code: 68745
- Area code: 402
- FIPS code: 31-26350
- GNIS feature ID: 2395644
- Website: Official City website

Laurel is a city in Cedar County, Nebraska located at the merger of Highway 20 and Highway 15 in the northeast corner of the state. Laurel sits roughly 40 miles east of Norfolk, Nebraska, west of Sioux City, Iowa, and south of Yankton, South Dakota. Wayne State College in Wayne, Nebraska is 15 miles south of Laurel. Its population was 975 at the 2020 census.

== History ==
Laurel was founded circa 1893. It was originally named Claremont Junction. The present name is after Laura Martin, the daughter of one of the founders.

In 2021 the city completed its last phase of a $2.6 million Downtown Revitalization Project which included removing the median from and pouring new concrete on East 2nd (Main) Street, widening the downtown sidewalks, and constructing a new city hall which houses the city offices, senior center, and can be used for parties and events.

Also in 2021 the city opened its new fire hall in thanks to fundraising and donations. The new fire hall holds up to seven fire engines, two ambulances, and has storage, a classroom, and common area spaces. The volunteer fire department and EMS are housed out of the hall.

Laurel was the site of a quadruple murder that occurred on August 4, 2022. A 53-year-old woman was shot to death in her own home, which was then set on fire. A house three blocks away was then broken into several minutes later, where an elderly couple and their daughter were also shot and killed before their home was also set on fire. Laurel resident Jason Jones was arrested shortly after and charged with their murders. He was convicted in 2024 and sentenced to death in 2026. His wife Carrie was later arrested as well and charged with aiding him in the murders. She was convicted in 2025 and sentenced to life imprisonment. The murders were the town's first homicide since 2005 and the first multiple murder since a double homicide in 1918.

In 2024, Laurel finished construction on their school building which houses the elementary and high school students. The former high school was demolished, a new addition was added, and the remainder of the school that still stood was completely renovated. This was part of a $25 million bond that passed in 2021 by a single vote, 596–595.

== Schools ==
Laurel is located within the Laurel-Concord-Coleridge School District. Currently the Elementary and High School are based in Laurel. Their mascot is the Bears.

== Churches ==
Laurel is served by four community churches:

- Faith Community Church, Nondenominational Christianity
- Immanuel Lutheran Church, Lutheran Church-Missouri Synod
- United Lutheran Church, Association of Free Lutheran Congregations
- United Presbyterian Church, Presbyterian Church (USA)

== Demographics ==
Historical population
Census	Pop.	Note	%±
1900	514		—
1910	514		0.0%
1920	830		61.5%
1930	864		4.1%
1940	861		−0.3%
1950	944		9.6%
1960	922		−2.3%
1970	1,009		9.4%
1980	1,031		2.2%
1990	981		−4.8%
2000	986		0.5%
2010	964		−2.2%
2020	972		0.8%
U.S. Decennial Census

=== 2010 census ===
At the 2010 census, 964 people in 415 households, including 263 families, lived in the city. The population density was 983.7 inhabitants per square mile (379.8/km^{2}). The 474 housing units had an average density of 483.7 units per square mile (186.8 units/km^{2}). The racial makeup of the city was 96.8% White, 0.2% African American, 0.2% Native American, 0.3% Asian, 1.2% from other races, and 1.2% from two or more races. Hispanics or Latinos of any race were 2.4%.

Of the 415 households, 26.3% had children under 18 living with them, 56.4% were married couples living together, 5.3% had a female householder with no husband present, 1.7% had a male householder with no wife present, and 36.6% were not families. About 33.5% of households were one person and 16.4% were one person aged 65 or older. The average household size was 2.26, and the average family size was 2.90.

The median age was 44.7 years; 22.6% of residents were under 18; 6.4% were between 18 and 24; 21.3% were from 25 to 44; 25% were from 45 to 64; and 24.7% were 65 or older. The gender makeup of the city was 48.0% male and 52.0% female.

=== 2000 census ===
At the 2000 census, 986 people in 414 households, including 264 families, were in the city. The population density was 1,072.5 inhabitants per square mile (414.1/km^{2}). The 466 housing units had an average density of 506.9 units per square mile (195.7 units/km^{2}). The racial makeup of the city was 99.49% White, 0.20% Native American, 0.10% Pacific Islander, 0.10% from other races, and 0.10% from two or more races. Hispanics or Latinos of any race were 0.30%.

Of the 414 households, 26.3% had children under 18 living with them, 56.3% were married couples living together, 6.3% had a female householder with no husband present, and 36.0% were not families. About 32.9% of households were one person, and 22.9% were one person 65 or older. The average household size was 2.28, and the average family size was 2.91.

The age distribution was 23.3% under 18, 6.3% from 18 to 24, 20.4% from 25 to 44, 19.8% from 45 to 64, and 30.2% 65 or older. The median age was 45 years. For every 100 females, there were 85.0 males. For every 100 females 18 and over, there were 79.1 males.

The median household income was $29,722, and for a family was $35,662. Males had a median income of $26,731 versus $20,833 for females. The per capita income for the city was $16,500. About 6.0% of families and 8.4% of the population were below the poverty line, including 10.0% of those under age 18 and 7.2% of those age 65 or over.

== Notable people ==
- Mark Calcavecchia, professional golfer
- James Coburn, actor
