= Brett Chapman =

Native American attorney from Oklahoma (born 1983)

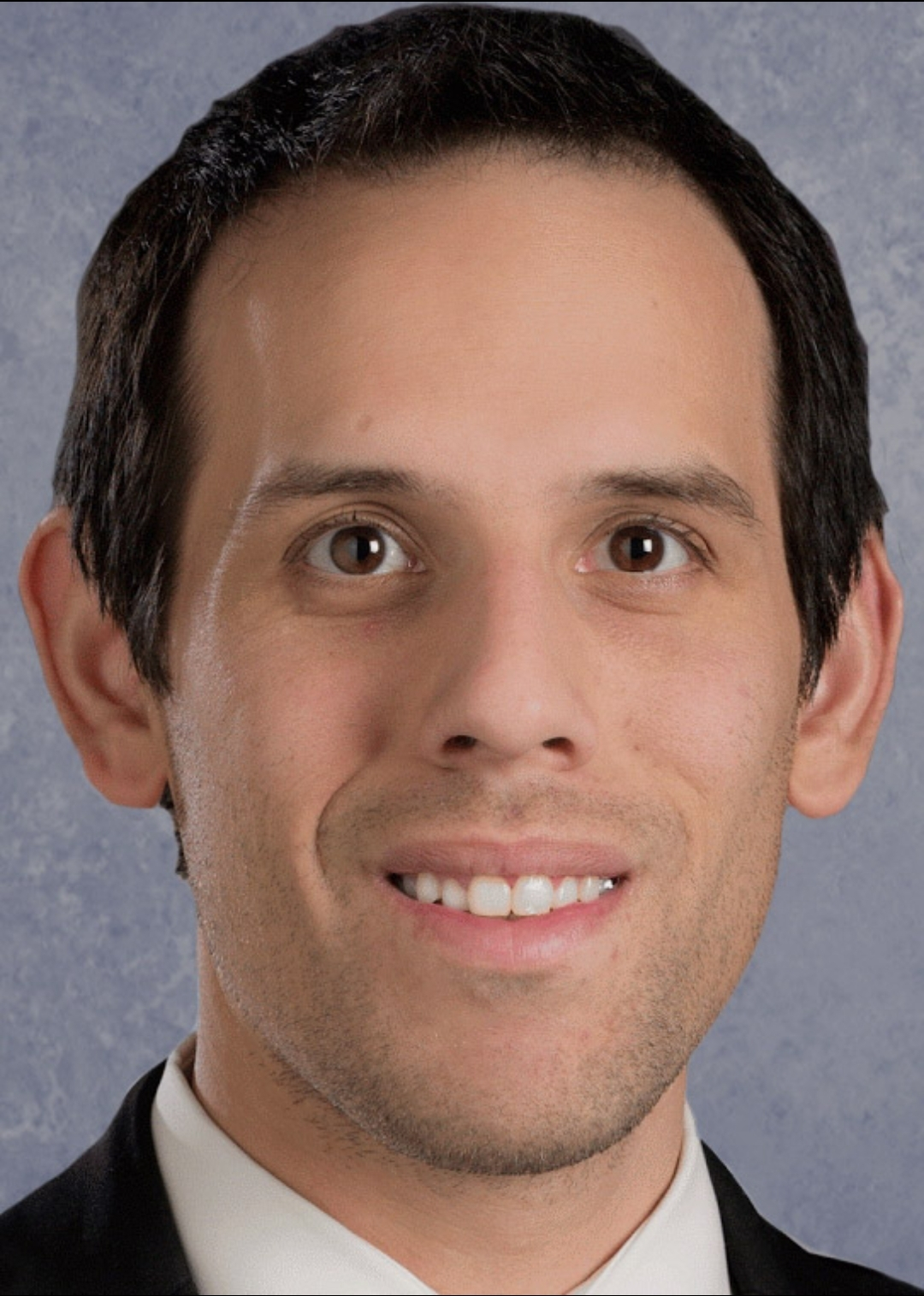
- Born: July 1983 (age 42); Oklahoma
- Citizenship: Pawnee Nation and U.S.
- Education: University of Oklahoma (BS); University of Tulsa (JD)
- Occupation: Attorney
- Years active: 2010–present
- Known for: Native American advocacy
- Website: brettachapman.com

Brett Chapman (born 1983) is a Native American attorney from Oklahoma. He is a direct lineal descendant of Chief White Eagle (1840–1914), and a public figure who frequently is interviewed and speaks on Native American civil rights and self-determination.

== Family history and early life ==
Chapman was born and raised in Oklahoma. He is an enrolled citizen of the Pawnee Nation and is of Ponca and Kiowa heritage. He is a direct lineal descendant of Chief White Eagle, "the celebrated chief of the Ponca tribe of Plains Indians, known for his vocal objection to the confinement of his people on reservations and his role in the subsequent ruling for equality for the Indian people in the 1870s." White Eagle was hereditary chief during the Ponca Trail of Tears in 1877. This forced removal killed over 300 people. Among the dead were White Eagle's wife and four of his children. Also dead was White Eagle's father Chief Iron Whip who signed the broken treaty with President Abraham Lincoln in 1865 and was the first Native American in a presidential inaugural parade at the Second inauguration of Abraham Lincoln.

White Eagle and Standing Bear fought the United States for the freedom to leave the confinements of their reservation in the Indian Territory and return to their ancestral lands in Nebraska. In the landmark 1879 civil rights case Standing Bear v. Crook, the Ponca became the first Native Americans to be legally recognized as "persons" under the meaning of the law and granted civil rights under the Constitution. The controversy over the Ponca Trail of Tears also forced President Rutherford B. Hayes to end Andrew Jackson's fifty year old policy of Indian removal that began in 1830 with Jackson's now controversial Indian Removal Act. White Eagle was credited for being responsible for the change in government policy.

Chapman attended a public school in rural Oklahoma and earned his bachelor's degree at the University of Oklahoma in 2007 and his J.D. degree at the University of Tulsa College of Law in 2010.

== Career ==
Chapman began his career as an Assistant District Attorney in Oklahoma and prosecuted homicides, violence against women, and crimes against children. In 2012, the Oklahoma rape crisis center Help in Crisis presented Chapman with the Mark Keeley Award for Most Outstanding Male Domestic Violence Advocate by an Oklahoma for championing the cause against violence in Eastern Oklahoma. In 2015, Chapman prosecuted two cases that resulted in published law in Oklahoma's highest appellate court. In the first, Chapman led an appeal that made Oklahoma law regarding when police officers may make arrests or conduct temporary detentions based on information provided by anonymous informants in State v. Alba, 341 F.3d 91, 401 (Okla. Crim. App 2015). On the appeal of the second case, the Oklahoma Court of Criminal Appeals upheld the constitutionality of a 2010 Oklahoma law that creates a zone of safety around certain locations frequented by children such as schools, childcare facilities, playgrounds, and parks by restricting registered sex offenders from being within 500 feet of those locations. Weeks v. State, 362 P.3d 650 (Okla. Crim. App. 2015).

Chapman later moved into civil practice where he represented railroad companies and now maintains a practice in Tulsa focused on criminal defense and civil rights litigation.

=== Native American advocacy ===
Chapman is also a public advocate for Native Americans on the issues of sovereignty, the Native American mascot controversy, and the proper representation of Native Americans in both a historical and contemporary context. He was interviewed by The Daily Oklahoman about the significance of the placement of a bronze statue of Chief Standing Bear in the National Statuary Hall at the U.S. Capitol, as a central figure in Standing Bear v. Crook (1879) for which Native Americans were recognized as persons with equal rights as other Americans. Chapman stated in a December 2019 public radio interview by PRI The World that Turkish president Recep Tayyip Erdogan was appropriating Native American history after Erdogan made a public statement that he would formally recognize Native American genocide in retaliation for the U.S. Senate recognition of the 1915 Armenian genocide.

==== Native American mascot controversy ====
In 2018, Chapman led the effort to retire a Native American mascot at Maine West High School in Des Plaines, Illinois after seeing an image of a student wearing a Chief Illiniwek costume performing a leaping dance at a high school assembly. Chapman discovered that administrators at Maine West had been claiming for years to have the endorsement of the Cherokee Nation to use the Native American imagery. After verifying that no such endorsement ever existed, he contacted a journalist at the Chicago Tribune, setting off social media chain reaction that brought Maine West into the long-running national debate over cultural appropriation. The Tribune ran the story on the front page of the April 6, 2018 edition with Chapman saying the mascot "trades on stereotypical images to serve as entertainment." Chapman said this particular case was especially egregious because "these educators claim to have some moral authority from a nation, from a legally recognized tribe" to use the imagery, which he called "complete malarkey." Maine West's Native American student population—though a small percentage of the overall population—backed the effort to remove the mascot and reached out to Chapman, providing him with other examples of offensive imagery from inside the school such as murals and totem poles by April 10. Chapman told reporters that "continuing to sanction the dance would be akin to the school choosing to honor a tradition of mockery over its students." The controversy continued for the next three weeks until Maine West announced the retirement of the Native American mascot and imagery on May 1, 2018. Many in favour of keeping the mascot expressed dismay, saying the decision was "really disheartening" while others accused detractors of "wiping away history." Chapman told the Tribune, "I commend the local administration for taking action very quickly" after administrators said their decision to make a change was in keeping with "the broader cultural shift" over Native American-themed mascots. On June 19, 2019, the Journal & Topics reported that all signs of Native American-themed imagery at Maine West was "fading away" in an article that included a photograph of a worker painting over a large Native American mural inside the school.

In 2019, Chapman advocated against the controversial Life of Washington mural by Victor Arnautoff in San Francisco and applauded the June 2019 decision to paint over offensive imagery of George Washington and American settlers stepping over the dead body of a Native American.

==== Self-determination ====
In 2019, Chapman met with the President of Catalonia Quim Torra in Washington during the European leader's official visit to the United States. (Note: ABC: "Torra chose very well who he met on the visit to the US, which began on Sunday and ends this Thursday. On Monday, he gave a lecture at Martin Luther King High School at Stanford University. Yesterday he was seen at a Washington restaurant with attorney Brett A. Chapman, a Native American rights defender and descendant of Standing Bear, a mythical Indian chief who fought for the freedom of his people. He then met with, among others, the respected Congressman Lewis, who marched with Martin Luther King in the 1960s.") Torra, Chapman, and linguist Josep Alay discussed mutual issues facing Native Americans and Catalonia including language revitalization, cultural identity, human rights, and Catalonia's non-violent movement to determine its own future as a unique people in Europe. Chapman also requested that the Government of Catalonia denounce all Catalan-speaking colonizers who participated in Spanish abuses during the Spanish colonization of the Americas. Afterward, Torra tweeted "Catalans always stand by the rights of Native American Nations," and on April 29, 2019 the Government of Catalonia issued a condemnation of "the abuses committed against the populations and original peoples of the Americas" during European colonization, saying it "deplored" the role played by Catalan slave-traders.

On November 28, 2018, Chapman led Native American criticism of Spanish foreign minister Josep Borrell after he claimed the United States "only had to kill four Indians" to achieve independence and national unity. According to European media, "After quoting what he describes as a 'shocking idiocy,' Chapman asked 'what's the matter with this man?'" and Carles Puigdemont — the former President of Catalonia now in exile following the 2017 Catalan independence referendum — responded to Chapman, saying "'what's the matter with this man?' is exactly the same question most Catalans ask themselves." In an interview with Barcelona media, Chapman said Borrell's comments exhibited "pure ignorance" and pointed to Spain's historical treatment of Native Americans saying, "Borrell should know that Spain killed a lot more people than four Indians." The following day, Spanish Foreign Minister Borrell issued an apology to Native Americans — in English. (Note: EFE: "Last Monday I referred in an excessively colloquial way, which I regret, to the almost annihilation of Native Americans in the present-day US by the colonizers,' Borrell said by way of an apology in a statement late Wednesday. 'This was done in the context of explaining that setting up a federal union in North America was easier than in Europe because, apart from sharing the same language, the original colonies had not fought bloody wars among themselves for centuries, which is what happened in the Old World. Instead, they engaged in the killing of the original inhabitants of North America,' he added. Borrell said the killings had been done in large numbers 'and should not be belittled. All my respect and sympathy to the Native American community,' he added.")

==== Representation of Native Americans on present-day and historical issues ====
Chapman criticizes unfair or historically inaccurate portrayals of Native Americans in popular culture, including in 2019 criticism of historian David McCollough following the release of his book The Pioneers: The Heroic Story of the Settlers Who Brought the American Ideal West. Chapman told the Associated Press that McCullough merely repeated the same stereotypes to justify stealing Native American land that the pioneers did when they stole it.

Chapman advocates for Native Americans in the national debate over the removal of statues, memorials and murals. Chapman points to the 2018 decision by the Republican-controlled Nebraska Legislature to remove a statue of a white male (William Jennings Bryan) from the National Statuary Hall Collection at the United States Capitol in favor of fellow Ponca Chief Standing Bear as setting the standard in representing Native Americans in the proper light, saying the non-partisan decision to honor a significant event in American history "will help spread the story and better help all Americans to understand our story."

He advocates changing Columbus Day to Native American Day or Indigenous Peoples' Day. In 2018, the Republican-controlled Oklahoma Legislature passed a law changing the name of Columbus Day to Native American Day; however, former Oklahoma governor Mary Fallin vetoed that legislation claiming that "combining a new Native American Day designation with the current Columbus Day holiday could be viewed as an intentional attempt to diminish the long-standing support of November being proclaimed annually as Native American Heritage Month." Chapman said Fallin's veto of a nonpartisan bill "defied logic" and was a slap in the face to Native Americans in Oklahoma to deny them a day to commemorate their unique history.

In 2019, the Philadelphia Inquirer interviewed Chapman for a Memorial Day article about 2nd Lt. Benjamin Hodgson, an officer with the 7th Cavalry buried in Philadelphia. Hodgson died at the Battle of the Little Bighorn alongside George Armstrong Custer in 1876. Chapman was asked whether Americans should honor soldiers who fought not in defense of country, but to dispossess native peoples of their land and their lives. Chapman responded, "I don't think American soldiers who oppressed Native Americans should be honored, any more than Confederate soldiers should be honored for defending slavery. The excuse that American soldiers were just following orders during the Indian Wars is an excuse that is no longer acceptable. They knew what they were doing." Chapman proposed that any such memorial should feature an explanatory plaque to offer a native perspective on any American soldier involved in the Indian Wars: "They largely believed in the mission, which was fully rooted in white supremacism, as that was the foundation of the Indian policy of the United States. A full and fair understanding of history will help Americans understand Native Americans."

== See also ==
- Native American mascot controversy
- Standing Bear
- Catalan independence movement
