= 1904 Populist National Convention =

- 1904 presidential election
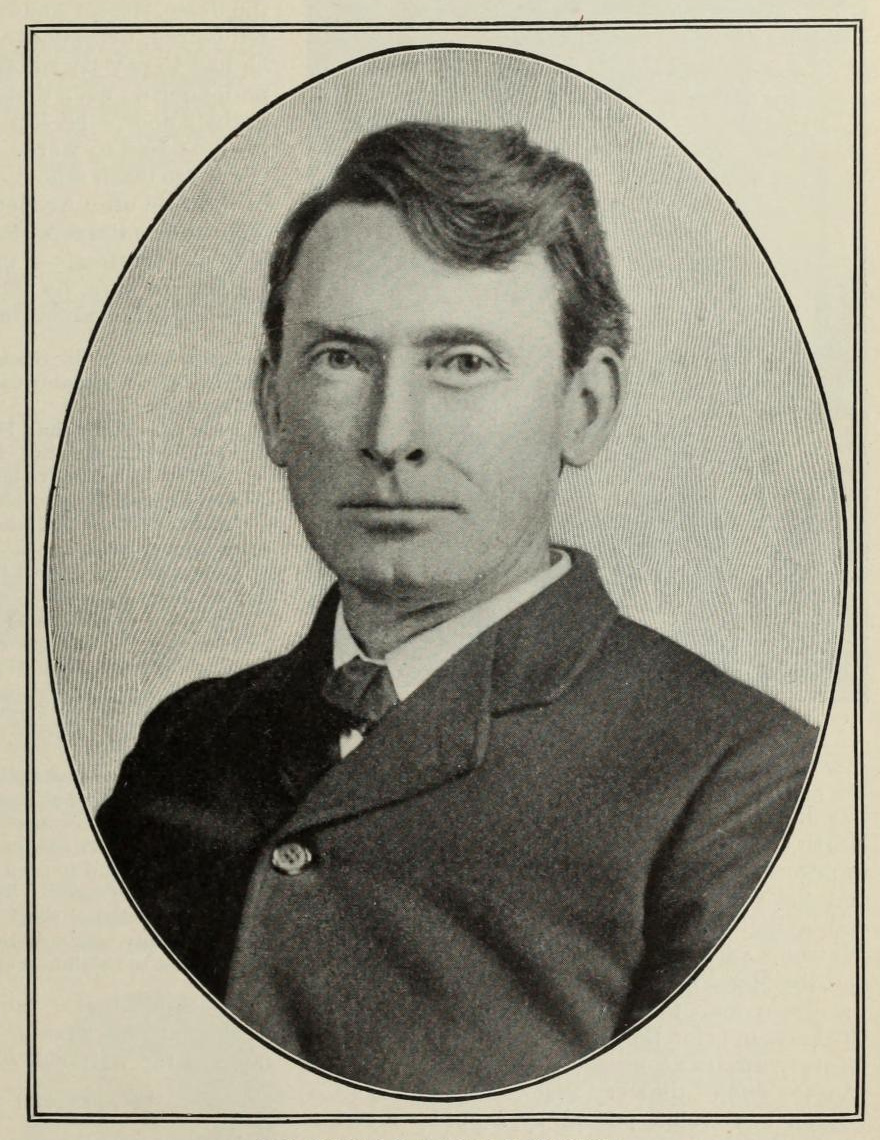
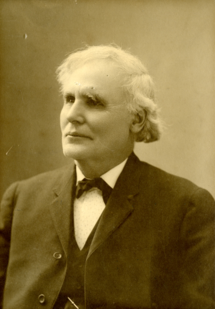
- Nominees (Watson and Tibbles)

Convention
- Date(s): July 4–6, 1904
- City: Springfield, Illinois
- Venue: Illinois State Arsenal

Candidates
- Presidential nominee: Thomas E. Watson of Georgia
- Vice-presidential nominee: Thomas Tibbles

The Populist Party held their presidential nominating convention for the 1904 United States presidential election in Springfield, Illinois from July 4 to 6, 1904.

== Logistics ==
The convention was held in the State Arsenal in Springfield, Illinois, which was considered to be a relatively sizable venue.

Former U.S. Congressman Luman Hamlin Weller of Iowa served as the temporary chairman at the start of the convention. J. H. Edmiston was appointed chair of the Committee on Resolutions.

Among the notable speakers at the convention was William V. Allen, former U.S. Senator from Nebraska.

== Nomination ==
In the preceding 1896 and 1900 elections, the party had co-endorsed the Democratic presidential nominee William Jennings Bryan in an electoral fusion arrangement. In 1904, however, the Populists were dissatisfied with the failure of Bryan to emerge as a contender at the 1904 Democratic National Convention, and in response chose to nominate their own unique ticket separate from that of the Democrats.After two ballots, Thomas Watson was selected as the party's presidential candidate and Thomas Tibbles was selected as his running mate.

Presidential ballotting	1st	2nd
Thomas E. Watson	334	698
William V. Allen	319	0
Samuel W. Williams	45	0

Vice-presidential ballotting	1st
Thomas H. Tibbles	698
