= John Lee Webster =

American lawyer

- Born: John Lee Webster; March 18, 1847; Harrison County, Ohio, US
- Died: September 2, 1929 (aged 82); Omaha, Nebraska, US
- Education: Mount Union College
- Occupation: Lawyer
- Years active: 1868-1929
- Known for: landmark Standing Bear case
- Spouse: Josephine Leah Watson

John Lee Webster was a prominent Nebraska lawyer who, with Andrew Jackson Poppleton, freed Ponca Chief Standing Bear from Army custody in a landmark decision in which it was held that the American Indian is a "person" within the meaning of the U.S. Constitution, entitled to its guarantee of due process of law. Webster has been described as one of Nebraska's greatest lawyers.

== Early years ==
John Lee Webster was born in New Rumley, Harrison County, Ohio, March 18, 1847. At age 17, he enlisted in the Union army during the Civil War. Serving with the 107th Ohio Infantry in the Shenandoah Valley and Washington DC areas, he was a member of a gun crew in the heavy artillery at Fort Simpson, Virginia, across the Potomac River from Washington, when it was feared that Confederate General Robert E. Lee would capture the city. Webster also saw service at Harper's Ferry and near Richmond. After the war, Webster enrolled at Mount Union College, Ohio, and graduated in law from Washington College, Pennsylvania.

== Legal career ==
Webster moved to Omaha in 1869, where he began his successful law practice.

Within three years, in 1872 at age 25, he was elected to the Nebraska state legislature. He was instrumental in securing the passage of a bill calling for a constitutional convention. Although it was vetoed by the governor, when the Nebraska Constitutional Convention subsequently met in 1875, Webster, at age 28, was elected its president.

Webster was made Omaha city attorney in 1887-1888. He was involved in many of the most important lawsuits brought in the city and served as general counsel for the Metropolitan Utilities District and for the Omaha and Council Bluffs Street Railway Company.

From 1905 to 1921, Webster was a member of the National Conference of Commissioners on Uniform State Laws.

Webster was famous for his lectures on Alexander Hamilton and on the U.S. Constitution. He spoke before the bar associations of Nebraska, Iowa, Colorado, and Minnesota.

=== Trial of Standing Bear ===
Webster was approached in the spring of 1879 by Thomas Henry Tibbles, assistant editor of the Omaha Daily Herald, who was concerned about the welfare of members of the Ponca tribe at Fort Omaha. They had been detained for their failure to return to Indian Territory under orders from the U.S. government. Tibbles was sympathetic to the plight of the tribe, which sought to return to tribal lands on the Niobrara River in northeastern Nebraska. He also approached Andrew J. Poppleton, counsel for the Union Pacific Railroad. Webster and Poppleton both agreed to represent Ponca Chief Standing Bear and the tribe without a fee, in a lawsuit to compel the government to justify their arrest. In a landmark ruling in Standing Bear v. Crook, U.S. District Court Judge Elmer S. Dundy held that "an Indian is a person within the meaning of the law" and that Standing Bear was being held illegally. He issued a writ of habeas corpus, which is an order to release someone held illegally. The most significant aspect of the ruling, according to some historians, concerned the legality of the Army's detention of Standing Bear. Judge Dundy concluded that no such authority existed in an act of Congress or in a treaty with the Ponca tribe, either to detain him, to remove him by force, or to force him back to the Indian Territory.

=== Star Route cases ===
Webster was appointed a special assistant United States attorney in the prosecution of the "Star Route" cases, a series of federal prosecutions in the early 1880s involving high-level corruption in the U.S. Post Office Department and fraudulent contracts for delivering mail in remote western territories.

=== Supreme Court cases ===
Over a quarter century, Webster appeared before the Supreme Court of the United States in a number of cases having significant legal impact.

The earliest among them, Marsh v. McPherson was a seminal case that explored critical issues related to contract law, including the delivery of possession, breach of warranties, and the appropriate measure of damages resulting from such breaches. Frost v. Spitley clarified the limited effect of quitclaim deeds in U.S. property law. Boyd v. Thayer and Elk v. Wilkins contributed to the development of legal principles of U.S. citizenship. Webster successfully defended a Chinese national against deportation in Liu Hop Fong v. U.S., and represented the government in Sloan v. U.S., which clarified the Supreme Court's appellate jurisdiction in a case involving a treaty. He brought before the court a controversy involving the purchase of private waterworks, in City of Omaha v. Omaha Water Co. In Shallenberger v. First State Bank of Holstein, Webster represented banks that challenged the Nebraska bank deposit guaranty law.

== Civic life ==
In 1888, Governor John Milton Thayer appointed Webster to represent Nebraska at the celebration in New York City of the centennial of George Washington's inauguration as president of the United States, held April 29-May 1, 1889.

In 1898, Webster addressed the opening of the Trans-Mississippi and International Exposition, held in Omaha.

In 1916, Webster was named the 22nd king of Ak-Sar-Ben, prominent Omaha civic and philanthropic organization.

Webster served for six years as president of the Nebraska Historical Society. In that position, he proposed a semi-centennial celebration of the 1867 admission of Nebraska into the Union. The celebration would include a historical pageant symbolizing the development of Nebraska and the relationship of the state to the opening and settlement of the West. The pageant took place in Omaha in October 1916, at which President and Mrs. Woodrow Wilson were present. More than 100,000 persons witnessed the Omaha celebrations. The ceremonies in Lincoln took place at the University of Nebraska commencement in June 1917, at which former President Theodore Roosevelt gave an address.

Until a few months before his death in 1929, Webster headed a committee seeking to create a World War I memorial in Omaha. Webster Street in Omaha is named in his honor.

== Political life ==
In 1889, Webster was said to have been highly endorsed and recommended for appointment to U.S. Supreme Court following the death of Associate Justice Stanley Matthews. He refused offers of appointment by President William McKinley to the posts of solicitor general of the United States, minister to Venezuela, and assistant secretary of war.

Webster was named chairman of the Nebraska delegation to the 1892 Republican National Convention, and was an at large delegate from Nebraska to the 1896 convention.

In 1904, the Nebraska State Republican Convention declared for the nomination of Theodore Roosevelt for president of the United States and endorsed Webster for vice-president.

== Personal life ==
In 1868, Webster married Josephine Leah Watson, whom he met in college. They had one daughter, Flora, born in 1875.

Webster died on September 2, 1929, at age 82, after a long illness.
