= Thomas Tibbles =

American abolitionist, writer, journalist, Native American rights activist and politician

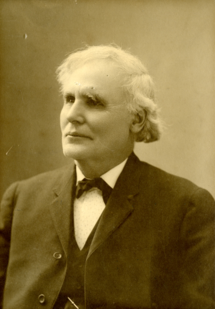

Personal details
- Born: May 22, 1840 Washington County, Ohio, U.S.
- Died: May 14, 1928 (aged 87) Omaha, Nebraska, U.S.
- Party: Populist
- Spouses: Amelia Owen (m. 1861; died 1879) Susette La Flesche (m. 1881; died 1903) Ida Belle Riddle (m. 1907)

Thomas Henry Tibbles (May 22, 1840 – May 14, 1928) was an American abolitionist, writer, journalist, Native American rights activist, and politician who was born in Ohio and lived in various other places in the United States, especially Nebraska. Tibbles played an important role in the trial of Standing Bear, a legal battle which led to the liberation of the Ponca tribe from the Indian Territory in Oklahoma in the year 1879. This landmark case led to important improvements in the civil rights of Native Americans throughout the country and opened the door to further advancement.

== Early life ==
Tibbles was born on May 22, 1840, near Athens, Ohio to William and Martha (Cooley) Tibbles. After moving to Winterset, Iowa, in 1854 to study law, Tibbles joined a guerilla abolitionist militia group led by James H. Lane, the Free-State Militia in 1856 at the age of 16. Later, he became a member of the company of John Brown and was in all the prominent battles during the two-year "Bleeding Kansas" conflict, a slavery-related border conflict, on the side of the abolitionists. Taken prisoner by pro-slavery forces, he was sentenced to be hanged but escaped, though he lost part of his ear to a musket ball. After the end of the Kansas hostilities, he spent some time with the Omaha, even accompanying them in a conflict with the Sioux.

After his time as a soldier, he studied at Mount Union College in Alliance, Ohio from 1858 until the beginning of the U.S. Civil War is 1861. On 1 October this same year, Tibbles married his first wife, Amelia Owen, Freedom, Pennsylvania, with whom he had his first two children, Eda Tibbles in 1868 and May Tibbles in 1870. During this time, he joined the Union forces as a scout in the states of Kansas and Missouri, and was assigned to break up gangs of horse thieves. One such gang, led by Charles Quantrell, captured and tortured him, though he was rescued again by his comrades. By the end of the war, Tibbles would rise to the rank of Major. For parts of the war, he worked as a wartime correspondent for national newspapers. Other than the brief time he spent as a circuit preacher (1871–1874), this would be the beginning of Tibbles' long career in the newspaper industry.

Of himself, Tibbles wrote that he was "Raised on the frontier and preferred not to be educated," and, "He carried perhaps the marks of more gunshot and other wounds… than any other one man in a thousand miles... He was one of the best shots with a revolver in the west."

== Career ==
=== Preacher ===
After his military service, he used the religion classes from Mount Union College and became a Methodist preacher. As a gun-toting circuit preacher, he rode around Missouri and Nebraska on horseback, preaching as he went. Eventually, he "grew disenchanted with Methodist restrictions," and became Presbyterian, building a church and gathering a congregation in Omaha, Nebraska. In 1874, Tibbles discovered that many Nebraskans were on the brink of starvation due to a drought and subsequent crop failure. Through fundraising and a public speaking tour alongside Rev. G. W. Frost, Tibbles succeeded in raising over $80,000 in relief for those affected. He continued working for various newspapers in Omaha while preaching. Tibbles would retire from the ministry in 1877 to pursue social justice through journalism full-time.

=== Reporter ===
Initially working as a journalist for the Omaha Daily Bee, Tibbles eventually settled at the Omaha Daily Herald, where he would become the assistant editor. This was where he was working when, at one A.M. on March 30, 1879, he was approached by General George Crook about the dire legal situation of the Ponca people.

== Trial of Standing Bear ==
=== Ponca plight ===
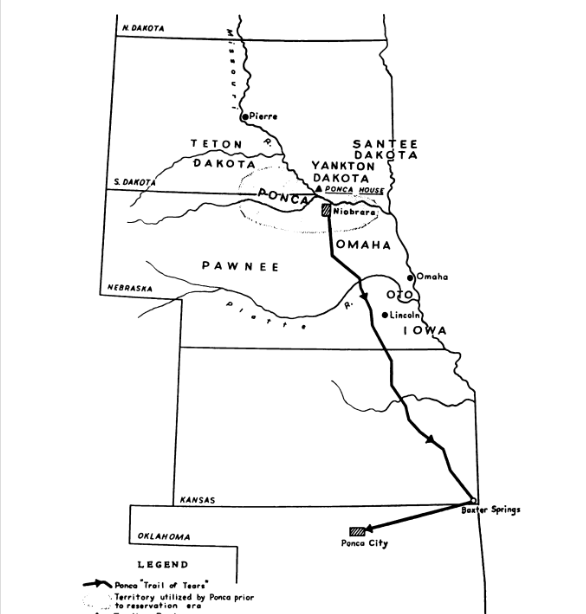
Ponca Trail of Tears map from "The Ponca Tribe" by James H. Howard

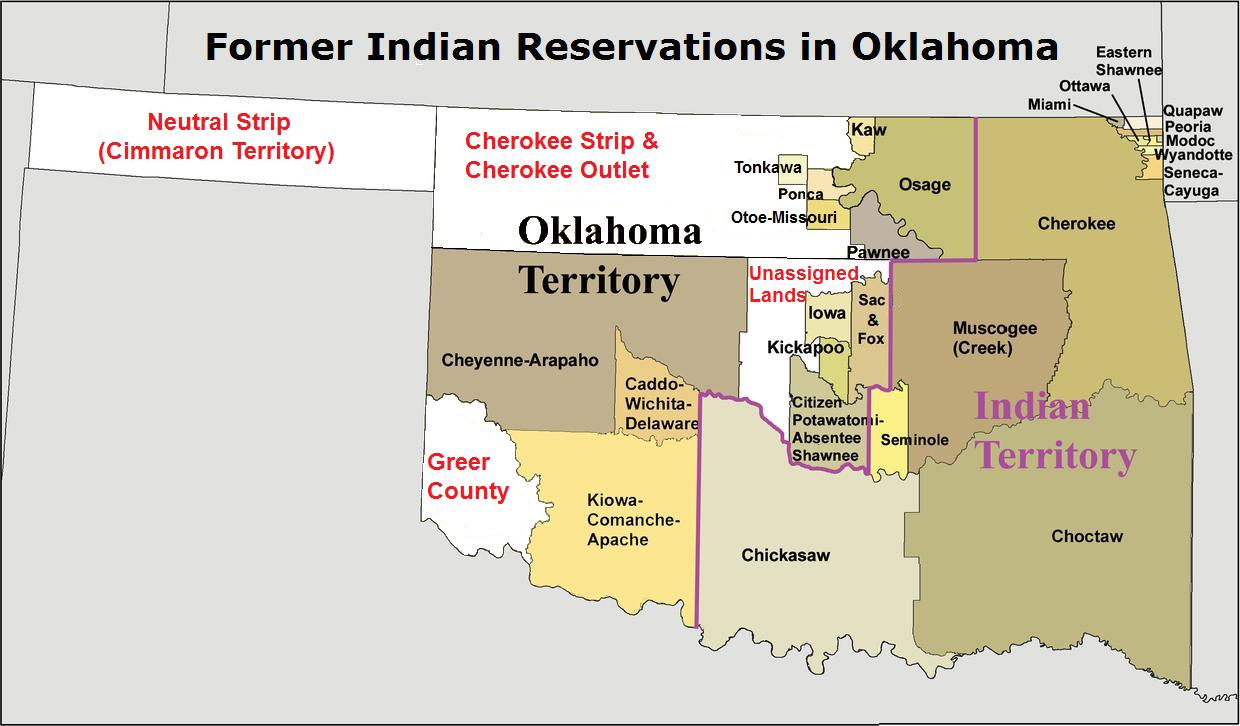
The scant reservation that was given to the Ponca people is seen here towards the northernmost limit of modern-day Oklahoma. They would find this land to be largely uninhabitable.

As assistant editor of the Omaha Daily Herald, Tibbles was instrumental in bringing the case of Standing Bear, Chief of the Ponca, and the tribe itself before the United States District Court at Fort Omaha in 1879. In a "flagrant violation" of a preexisting treaty, the government had mistakenly turned over the Ponca's ancestral lands in Nebraska to the Sioux tribe, forcing the Ponca to walk some 500 miles southward to the Oklahoma Indian Territory. According to the account given by Standing Bear, his people were taken to the Indian Territory where they struggled to survive. Although the Omaha tribe, who were closely related to the Ponca and spoke the same language, had given them 30 acres of good land, the government would not allow them to take it. Due to malaria, extreme weather, and insufficient government assistance, approximately one-third of the tribe had not survived the conditions of the reservation during the approximately two years that they spent there. Standing Bear lamented, "we had nothing to do but sit still, be sick, starve, and die."

=== Tibbles' involvement ===
Tibbles met the acquaintance of Standing Bear on March 30, 1879, after the Chief and some 30 Ponca were placed under arrest and were being held by order of the U.S. Secretary of the Interior, Carl Schurz, for fleeing from the Indian Territory to their original lands. General George Crook, who objected to his orders to arrest the group, met secretly with Tibbles in his office and implored him to take up their case, insisting that he was the only one who could save them. Standing Bear, whose people faced starvation, wanted his land back, as well as "plows and axes and wagons" and a legal contract that their land would never again be taken from them.

"General, if I once went into such a fight as that, I should never give up till I won or died. It would require at least five years and cost thousands of dollars... you're asking a great deal of me." -Thomas Tibbles

Making a decision to take up the cause of the Ponca tribe, Tibbles began to raise awareness of their dire situation by publishing their story in the major surrounding newspapers. Through his efforts and those of Susette La Flesche, Standing Bear's daughter and a well-educated Omaha interpreter who raised awareness of the issue by speaking to local church congregations, they obtained pro-bono legal representation for Standing Bear in court and raised national awareness of the case. John Lee Webster and A. J. Poppleton, the attorneys who represented Standing Bear, filed a writ of habeas corpus on behalf of the Chief, and their case was heard during a two-day session commencing on April 28th, 1879 in the U.S. District Court at Fort Omaha.

=== Trial ===
The case for the government was that Native Americans did not qualify as "persons" under U.S. law, and as such did not have basic rights of citizenship, such as the right to sue the federal government. Additionally, they argued that the Ponca's way of life was not truly being obstructed by the government's regulations. The attorneys who represented Standing Bear argued that the Ponca were trying to "[adopt] the ways of the whites" through agriculture and obedience to U.S. law and they insisted that the Ponca qualified as citizens under the newly ratified 14th Amendment.

=== Verdict ===
Judge Elmer Dundy ruled in favor of Standing Bear, concluding that Native Americans had citizenship rights. He declared that they have the right to sue the government, that the U.S. Army had no right to take them from their land, and ordered the immediate release of the 30 incarcerated Ponca being held at Fort Omaha. Most importantly, it was decided that "...An Indian is a PERSON within the meaning of the laws of the United States..." and that they "Have the inalienable right to 'life, liberty and the pursuit of happiness' so long as they obeyed the law." Indian rights activism would become Tibbles' legacy as he continued his activism for the rest of his life.

== Political involvement and death ==
=== After the trial ===
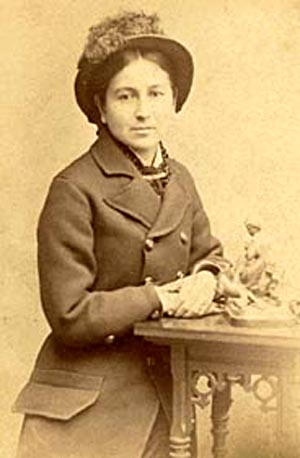
Susette "Bright Eyes" La Flesche, married to Thomas Tibbles on June 29, 1881. Remembered as an influential speaker on Native rights.

Once the trial of Standing Bear was over, Thomas Tibbles would continue to campaign for equal treatment for Native Americans. During the summer of 1879 until early September of the same year, he went on a speaking tour to Chicago and Boston raising awareness of the plight of the Poncas, in addition to the other tribes in the Nebraska territory, as well as lobbying for Native American citizenship. He would set off on another tour with Chief Standing Bear, his son, Woodworker, and his daughter Bright Eyes, who had served as Standing Bear's interpreter at the trial and was also known as Susette La Flesche. This tour also went through Chicago and Boston, and this time included New York City. While traveling, Tibbles would get word that his wife had suddenly died from peritonitis. In 1880, Tibbles published his first book under the pseudonym "Zylyff", The Ponca Chiefs: An Account of the Trial of Standing Bear.

Thomas Tibbles and Susette La Flesche would be married on June 29, 1881, the same year Tibbles published his second book, Hidden Power, this time under his own name. They would initially settle in Omaha in a sod house with a farm. Both Tibbles and his new wife would continue lecturing throughout 1882–83, and they successfully lobbied for Congress to grant the Omaha tribe permanent individual allotments, though some of them would be dissatisfied about the way the land was divided. From 1883 to 1885, they moved to Washington, D.C. where they continued to lecture on Native American subjects. They would also go on a speaking tour in England and Scotland in 1886.

In 1888, Tibbles returned as a reporter to the Omaha Daily Herald, where on a visit to Pine Ridge Agency in 1890, he would be an eyewitness to and at the forefront of the massacre at Wounded Knee, where he reported the tragedy to the world. His work as a journalist would continue for many different newspapers, including working as a Washington correspondent from 1893 to 1895.

=== Populism and the vice-presidential nomination ===
After his work in Washington was finished, Tibbles returned to Nebraska and became very involved in the Populist movement, becoming the editor-in-chief of The Independent, a weekly Populist newspaper. He would become increasingly active in the Populist movement until, in 1904, he was nominated to be the vice-president on the Populist ticket, though his ticket did not win. This was just a year after his wife's death on May 26, 1903.

=== Post-election ===
In 1905, Tibbles would write his third and final book, Buckskin and Blanket Days, which was his autobiography. He also married his third and final wife, Ida Belle Riddle, in 1907 after the death of La Flesche. He would continue his active involvement in the Populist movement, including editing other newspapers for the party, from 1905 to 1910; after which he returned once again to the Omaha World Herald until his retirement in 1928. He died on May 14, 1928, and was buried in Bellevue Cemetery, Bellevue, Nebraska, and Ida was later buried alongside him.

== Works ==
- Thomas Henry Tibbles (1881). Hidden Power. G. W. Carleton & Co.
- Thomas Henry Tibbles (1879). The Ponca Chiefs. Lockwood, Brooks & Co.
- Thomas Henry Tibbles (1957). Buckskin and Blanket Days: Memoirs of a Friend of the Indians. Doubleday. (Tibbles' autobiography written in 1905)
