= Paladine Roye =

American painter

Paladine H. Roye (Pon-Cee-Cee)
- Born: December 8, 1946; White Eagle, Oklahoma
- Died: May 25, 2001 (aged 54); Enid, Oklahoma
- Education: self-taught
- Known for: Painting

Paladine Roye (1946–2001) was a Native American painter.

== Background ==
Paladine H. Roye was born December 8, 1946, in White Eagle, Oklahoma. He was a full blood, enrolled member of the Ponca Tribe of Indians of Oklahoma. His Ponca name was Pon-Cee-Cee, which means "watch out for this one." He graduated from high school and served in the United States Marine Corps during the Vietnam War era.

== Artwork ==
He became a full-time painter in 1979, working in acrylic, watercolor, gouache, and prints. Paladine Roye often collaborated with his brother, Burgess Roye.

== Honors ==
In 1982, to celebrate 75 years of Oklahoma statehood, the Garfield County Historical Society and the Museum of the Cherokee Strip held Indian Week. They featured art by Paladine and Burgess Roye, and their mother, Doris Roye. In 1996, the pair painted large murals on the Garfield County, Oklahoma courthouse in order to pay off fines for a DUI.

Roye's work has been featured in the following publications: Medina in 1981, The Indian Trader in September 1982, Southwest Art in July 1989. His work was shown in the 1984 film Native American Images by Carol Patton Cornsilk.

Roye was awarded Best of Show in 1986 and Best Graphic in 1988 by the Colorado Indian Market in Denver, Colorado. The same year Roye also won 1st place at the Red Earth Festival's Indian art competition in Oklahoma City, Oklahoma.

Collections of his work can be viewed at the Gilcrease Museum in Tulsa, Oklahoma. His work has also been exhibited at the Cherokee National Museum's Trail of Tears art show in Tahlequah, Oklahoma; the Heard Museum Guild Indian Fair and Market in Phoenix, Arizona; the Inter-tribal Indian Ceremonials in Church Rock, New Mexico; the Twin Cities Indian Market and Juried Art Show by Indian Arts of America in Saint Paul, Minnesota; and the American Indian Arts Council's Festival and Market in Dallas, Texas.

== Death ==
Roye died on May 25, 2001.
