= White Eagle, Oklahoma =

- Unincorporated community and Census designated place
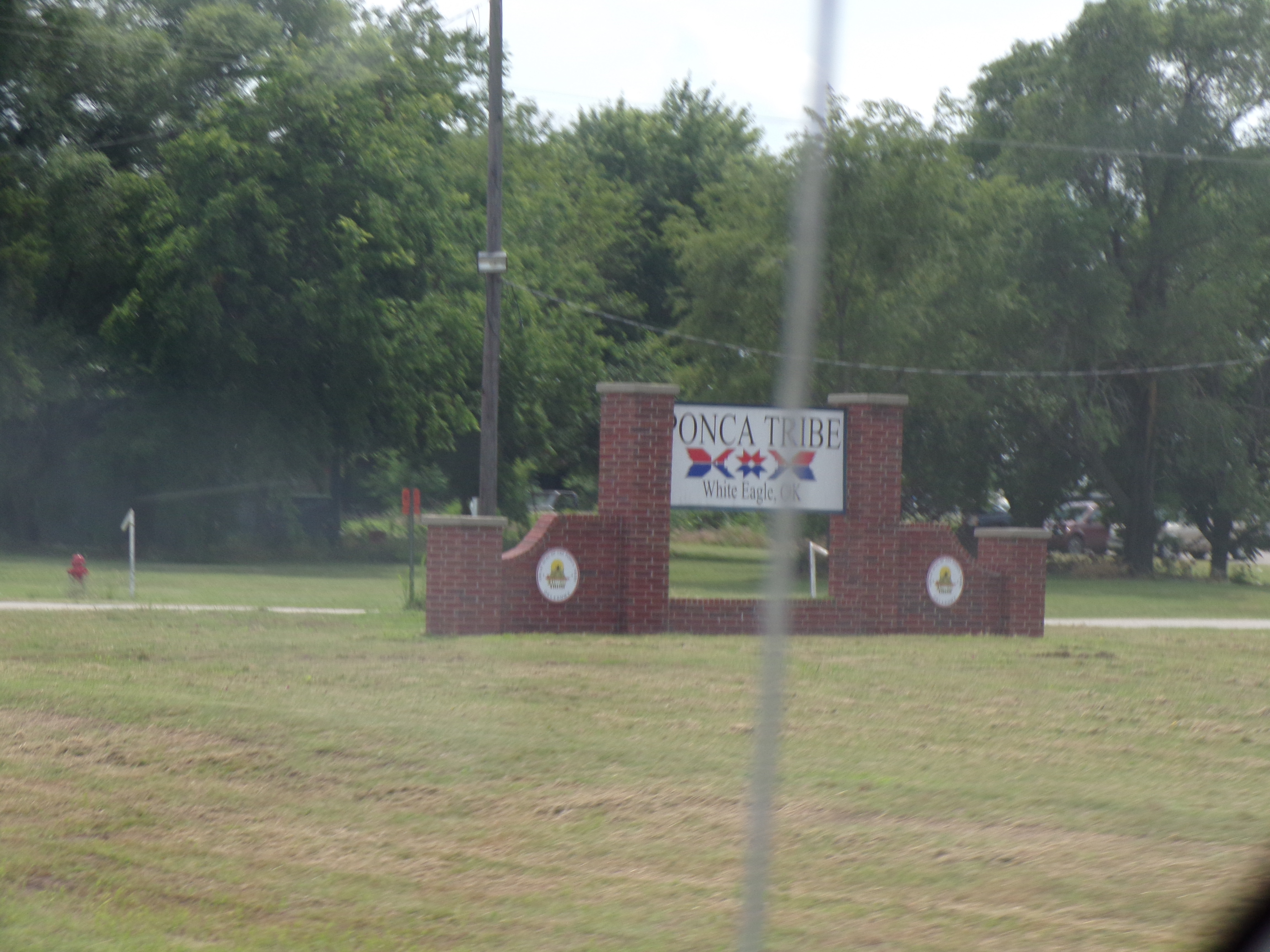
- Ponca Tribe Sign in White Eagle

- Location within Oklahoma Location within the United States
- Coordinates: 36°37′36″N 97°04′52″W
- Country: United States
- State: Oklahoma
- County: Kay

Area
  - Total: 5.87 sq mi (15.20 km^{2})
  - Land: 5.87 sq mi (15.20 km^{2})
  - Water: 0 sq mi (0.00 km^{2})
- Elevation: 925 ft (282 m)

Population (2020)
  - Total: 520
  - Density: 89/sq mi (34/km^{2})
- Time zone: UTC-6 (CST)
  - Summer (DST): UTC-5 (CDT)
- Area code: 580
- FIPS code: 40-80750
- GNIS ID: 2805362

White Eagle is an unincorporated community and Census designated place in Kay County, Oklahoma, United States. As of the 2020 census, White Eagle had a population of 520.

== History ==
White Eagle was named for the Ponca principal chief, White Eagle (ca. 1840-1914), who led the Ponca to their reservation in Indian Territory. Other names for the town are Ponca, White Eagle Agency, and Whiteagle.

== Geography ==
White Eagle is located in southeastern Kay County, just east of the Salt Fork and approximately one and one quarter miles west-northwest of the confluence of the Salt Fork with the Arkansas River. The community is on U.S. Route 177, five miles south of Ponca City.

== Demographics ==
Historical population
Census	Pop.	Note	%±
2020	520		—
U.S. Decennial Census

=== 2020 census ===
As of the 2020 census, White Eagle had a population of 520. The median age was 33.0 years. 34.0% of residents were under the age of 18 and 12.7% of residents were 65 years of age or older. For every 100 females there were 95.5 males, and for every 100 females age 18 and over there were 81.5 males age 18 and over.

0.0% of residents lived in urban areas, while 100.0% lived in rural areas.

There were 158 households in White Eagle, of which 38.6% had children under the age of 18 living in them. Of all households, 32.3% were married-couple households, 22.2% were households with a male householder and no spouse or partner present, and 34.2% were households with a female householder and no spouse or partner present. About 24.0% of all households were made up of individuals and 13.9% had someone living alone who was 65 years of age or older.

There were 163 housing units, of which 3.1% were vacant. The homeowner vacancy rate was 0.0% and the rental vacancy rate was 0.0%.

Racial composition as of the 2020 census
Race	Number	Percent
White	86	16.5%
Black or African American	0	0.0%
American Indian and Alaska Native	407	78.3%
Asian	0	0.0%
Native Hawaiian and Other Pacific Islander	0	0.0%
Some other race	16	3.1%
Two or more races	11	2.1%
Hispanic or Latino (of any race)	31	6.0%

== Government ==
White Eagle is the headquarters for the Ponca Tribe of Indians of Oklahoma.

== Education ==
It is in Ponca City Public Schools, which operates Ponca City High School.

== Notable people ==
- Paladine Roye, Ponca painter, 1946-2001
