= Standing Bear =

Native American leader (c. 1829–1908)

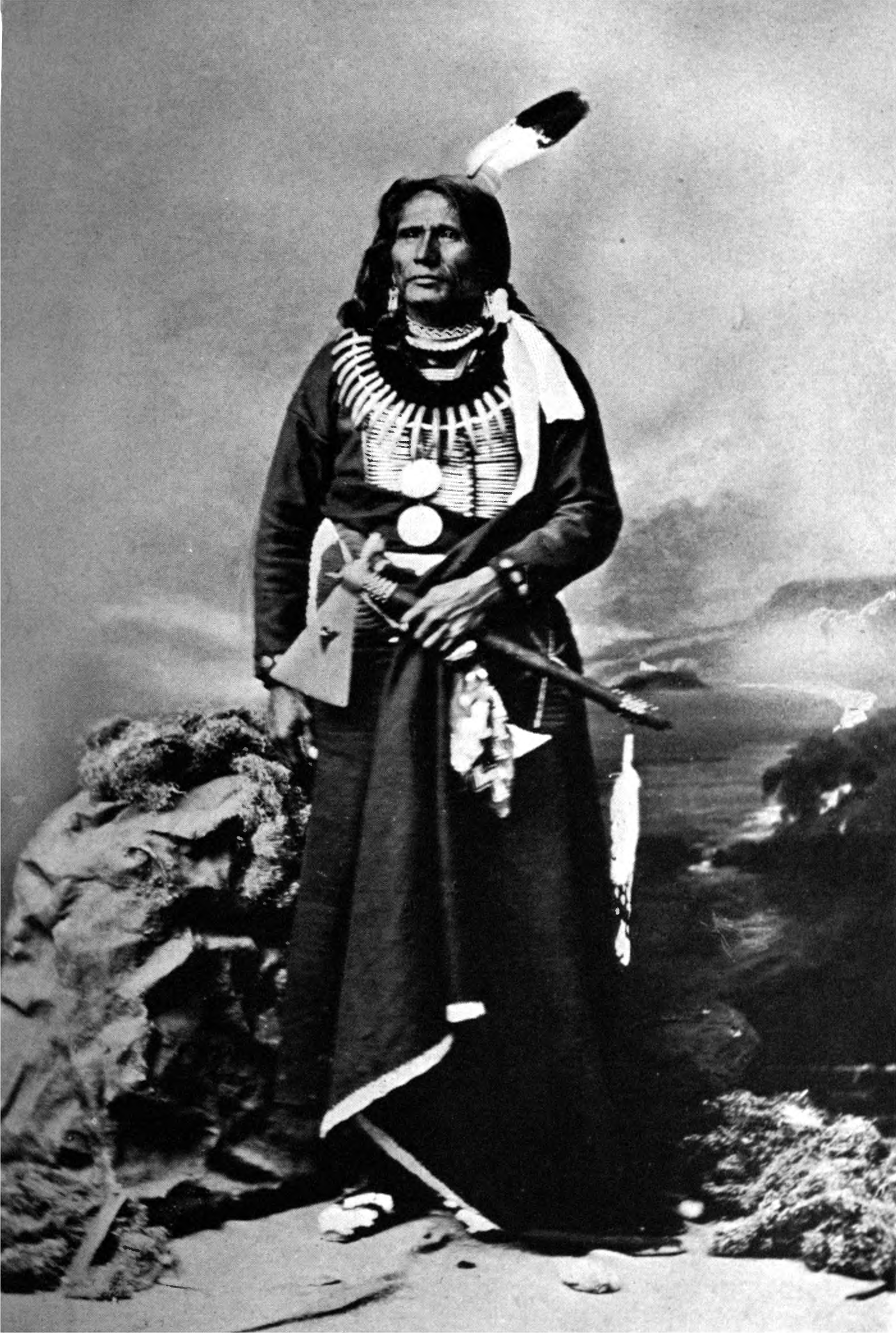
- Born: 1829
- Died: 1908 (aged 78–79)
- Occupations: Chief and Native American civil rights leader
- Known for: First Native American judicially granted civil rights under American law

Standing Bear (c. 1829–1908; Ponca official orthography: Maⁿchú-Naⁿzhíⁿ or Macunajin; other spellings: Ma-chú-nu-zhe, Ma-chú-na-zhe or Mantcunanjin, pronounced [mãtʃuꜜnãʒĩꜜ]) was a Ponca chief and Native American civil rights leader who successfully argued in U.S. District Court in 1879 in Omaha that Native Americans are "persons within the meaning of the law" and have the right of habeas corpus, thus becoming the first Native American judicially granted civil rights under American law. His first wife Zazette Primeau (Primo), daughter of Lone Chief (also known as Antoine Primeau), mother of Prairie Flower and Bear Shield, was also a signatory on the 1879 writ that initiated the famous court case.

== Background ==
By 1789, when Juan Baptiste Munier acquired trading rights with the Ponca, they had villages along the Niobrara River near its mouth, and ranged as far east as present-day Ponca, Nebraska, at the mouth of Aowa Creek. A smallpox epidemic caused the population of the Poncas to fall from around 800 to approximately 200 at the time of the Lewis and Clark Expedition in 1804.

When Standing Bear was born circa 1829, the Ponca traditionally raised maize, vegetables, and fruit trees in these sites during the summer. They ranged westward for the winter bison hunt. The hunts brought them into frequent contact with their traditional enemies, the Brulé and Oglala Lakota. Sometimes the Ponca allied with their enemies to raid Pawnee and Omaha villages, but they also suffered raids by them.

In Standing Bear's childhood, Brulé raids forced the Ponca to rely more on agriculture and less on the winter bison hunt. In his adolescence, the tribe split into two villages: Húbthaⁿ ('Fish Smell', pronounced [huːꜜblᶞã]), near the mouth of Ponca Creek; and Wáiⁿ-Xúde ('Grey Blanket', pronounced pronounced [waꜜĩ xuꜜde]), on the northwest bank of the Niobrara. Standing Bear learned the ways of the men, how to hunt and fish, and prepared to take his place in the tribe.

In 1859, when Standing Bear was a young man, the Kansas-Nebraska Act of 1854 had encouraged a flood of European-American settlers, and the United States government pressured the Nebraska tribes to sell their land. At the same time, they were suffering raids from the north by the Brulé and Oglala. Because tribal land claims overlapped, the Omaha treaty of 1854 included a cession of a 70-mile-mile-wide strip (110 km) of land between Aowa Creek and the Niobrara, which was also claimed by the Ponca.

By 1862, white settlers were quickly moving in and building the town of Niobrara where the Ponca summer corn fields had been. The Brulé raids from the north cut off the winter hunting grounds and forced the Ponca to abandon Húbthaⁿ. In 1858, under this pressure, the Ponca ceded much of their lands to the United States. They reserved the land between Ponca Creek and the Niobrara, approximately between present-day Butte and Lynch, Nebraska.

The land to which the Ponca moved proved unsuitable; poor farming conditions led to persistent famine. They were still subject to raids by hostile tribes. The Ponca spent years attempting to hunt and raise crops and horses near their old village of Húbthaⁿ and the town of Niobrara. The government failed to provide the mills, personnel, schools, and protection that it had promised by the 1858 treaty. It did not keep up with the increasing Ponca tribal enrollment in distribution of annuities and goods. Relatives sought annuity payments, people lost resources to sickness and starvation, and raids from hostile tribes were frequent.

In 1865 a new treaty allowed the Ponca to return to their traditional farming and burial grounds, in the much more fertile and secure area between the Niobrara and Ponca Creek east of the 1858 lands and up to the Missouri River. With the Treaty of Fort Laramie (1868), however, the government illegally gave the new Ponca reservation to the Santee Dakota as part of its negotiation to end Red Cloud's War. The government soon began to seek to remove the Ponca to Indian Territory.

== Marriage and family ==
Prior to the 1877 removal, Standing Bear had married Zazette Primeau (Primoux), and had become a leader in the tribe. He and his wife Zazette had several children, including Prairie Flower and Bear Shield (born 1862), both of whom died during 'Removal' (1877) or right after (1879).

In the 1900 Census, Standing Bear resided in Raymond Township, Knox County, Nebraska with his family listed (all born in Nebraska):

Standing Bear age 71 (born May 1828); Zazette Bear age 63, wife (born March 1836) (mother of 0 children, 0 living); Lali [Laura, nee Premeaux] Bear age 31, second wife (born 1868) (mother of 7 children, 5 living); Fanny Bear age 15, daughter (born 1884); Lucy Bear age 14, daughter (born 1889); Fisher Bear age 11, son (born 1892); Jennie Bear age 6, daughter (born Feb 1894); Henry Bear age 4, son (born Aug 1895).

== Standing Bear v. Crook ==
The Ponca paramount chief White Goose, Standing Bear, and other Ponca leaders met with U.S. Indian Agent A. J. Carrier and signed a document allowing removal to Indian Territory (present-day Oklahoma). White Eagle and other Ponca leaders later claimed that because of a mistranslation, he had understood that they were to move to the Omaha Reservation, not to the Indian Territory.

In February 1877, ten Ponca chiefs, including Standing Bear, accompanied Inspector Edward C. Kemble to Indian Territory to view several tracts of land. After viewing lands on the Osage Reservation and the Kaw Reservation, the chiefs were unhappy with what they were shown, and asked to return home without looking at the Quapaw Reservation. Angry at what he called the Ponca chiefs' "insubordination", Kemble refused to take them home until they had viewed all the land. Instead, eight of the chiefs decided to return home on foot. Kemble visited the Quapaw Reservation and selected it as the removal destination. In April, Kemble headed south to the Quapaw Reservation near present-day Peoria, Oklahoma, with those Ponca willing to leave. In May, the remainder of the tribe was forced to move, including Standing Bear and his family.

The Ponca arrived in Oklahoma too late to plant crops that year, and the government failed to provide them with the farming equipment it had promised as part of the deal. In 1878 they moved 150 miles (240 km) west to the Salt Fork of the Arkansas River, south of present-day Ponca City, Oklahoma. By spring, nearly a third of the tribe had died due to starvation, malaria, and related causes. Standing Bear's eldest son, Bear Shield, was among the dead. Standing Bear had promised to bury him in the Niobrara River valley homeland, so he left to travel north with about 30 followers.

When they reached the Omaha Reservation in Nebraska, they were welcomed as relatives. Word of their arrival in Nebraska soon reached the government. Under orders from the Secretary of the Interior, Carl Schurz, who also directed the Bureau of Indian Affairs, Brigadier General George Crook had the Ponca arrested for having left the reservation in Indian Territory. The army took Standing Bear and the others to Fort Omaha, where they were detained. Although the official orders were to return them immediately to Indian Territory, Crook was sympathetic to the Ponca and appalled to learn of the conditions they had left. He delayed their return so the Ponca could rest, regain their health, and seek legal redress.

Crook told the Ponca story to Thomas Tibbles, an outspoken advocate of Native American rights (who had once served under John Brown). Tibbles, an editor of the Omaha Daily Herald, publicized the Poncas' story widely. Omaha attorney John Lee Webster offered his services pro bono and was joined by Andrew J. Poppleton, chief attorney of the Union Pacific Railroad.

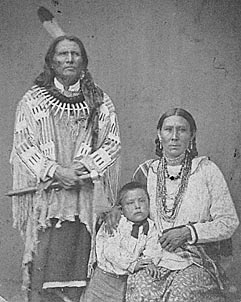
Standing Bear, Zazette Primeaux Bear, and child

They aided Standing Bear, who in April 1879 sued for a writ of habeas corpus in U.S. District Court in Omaha, Nebraska. Acting as interpreter for Standing Bear was Susette LaFlesche, an accomplished and educated bilingual Omaha of mixed-race background. The case is called United States ex rel. Standing Bear v. Crook. General Crook was named as the formal defendant because he was holding the Ponca under color of law.

As the trial drew to a close, the judge announced that Chief Standing Bear would be allowed to make a speech in his own behalf. Raising his right hand, Standing Bear proceeded to speak. Among his words were, "That hand is not the color of yours, but if I prick it, the blood will flow, and I shall feel pain," said Standing Bear. "The blood is of the same color as yours. God made me, and I am a Man."

On May 12, 1879, Judge Elmer S. Dundy ruled that "an Indian is a person" within the meaning of habeas corpus. He stated that the federal government had failed to show a basis under law for the Poncas' arrest and captivity.

It was a landmark case, recognizing that an Indian is a "person" under the law and entitled to its rights and protection. "The right of expatriation is a natural, inherent and inalienable right and extends to the Indian as well as to the more fortunate white race," the judge concluded.

Years later, blind and in failing health, the attorney Poppleton reflected on his final court plea for Standing Bear: "I cannot recall any two hours' work of my life with which I feel better satisfied."

The army immediately freed Standing Bear and his followers. He went to Poppleton's residence and presented him with what was described as a "magnificent headdress." Standing Bear was quoted as saying, "If I had to pay you I could never get enough to do it." The case gained the attention of the Hayes administration, which provided authority for Standing Bear and some of the tribe to return permanently to the Niobrara valley in Nebraska.

== Lecture tour ==
Between October 1879 and 1883, Standing Bear traveled in the eastern United States speaking about Indian rights in forums sponsored by Indian advocate and former abolitionist, Wendell Phillips. Susette (Bright Eyes) LaFlesche, later married to Henry Tibbles, and her brother Francis, who later became an ethnologist with the Smithsonian Institution, accompanied Standing Bear on the speaking tour. The LaFlesche siblings took turns acting as his translator. Tibbles also was part of the party. During his lecture tour, Standing Bear won the support of poet Henry Wadsworth Longfellow and other prominent Americans.

== Later years ==
After returning from the east, Standing Bear resided at his old home on the Niobrara. He farmed near 170 other Ponca who had been allowed to resettle there.

In 1893 Standing Bear worked for Buffalo Bill's Wild West show in Chicago and visited the World's Columbian Exposition where he rode the Ferris Wheel in full ceremonial headdress.

He died in 1908 of oral cancer and was buried on a hill overlooking the site of his birth. Today the federal government recognizes two tribes of the people: the Ponca Tribe of Nebraska and the Ponca Tribe of Oklahoma.

== Legacy and honors ==
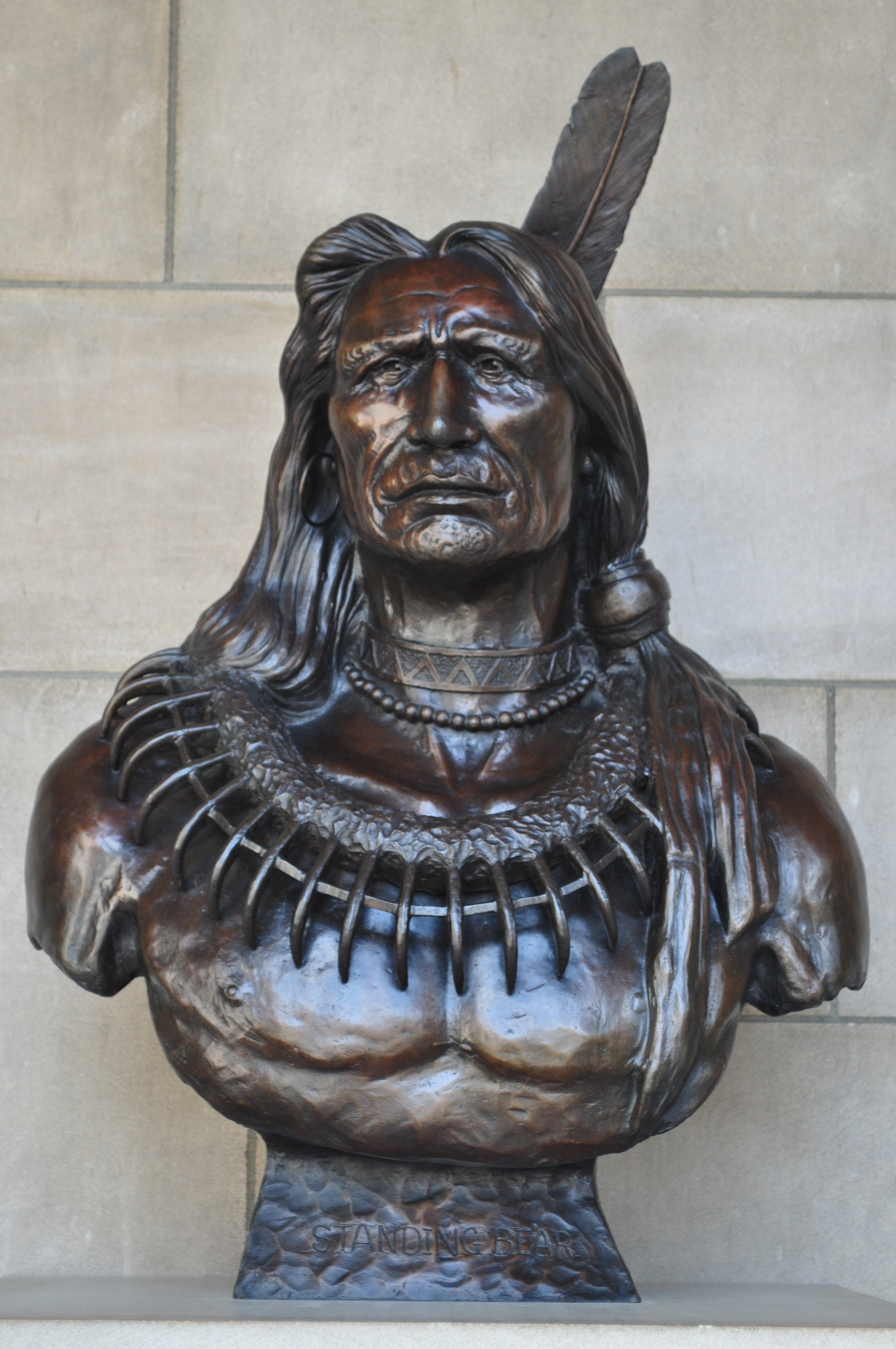
A bust of Standing Bear, created by Ted Long in 1980 to commemorate Standing Bear being a member of the Nebraska Hall of Fame.

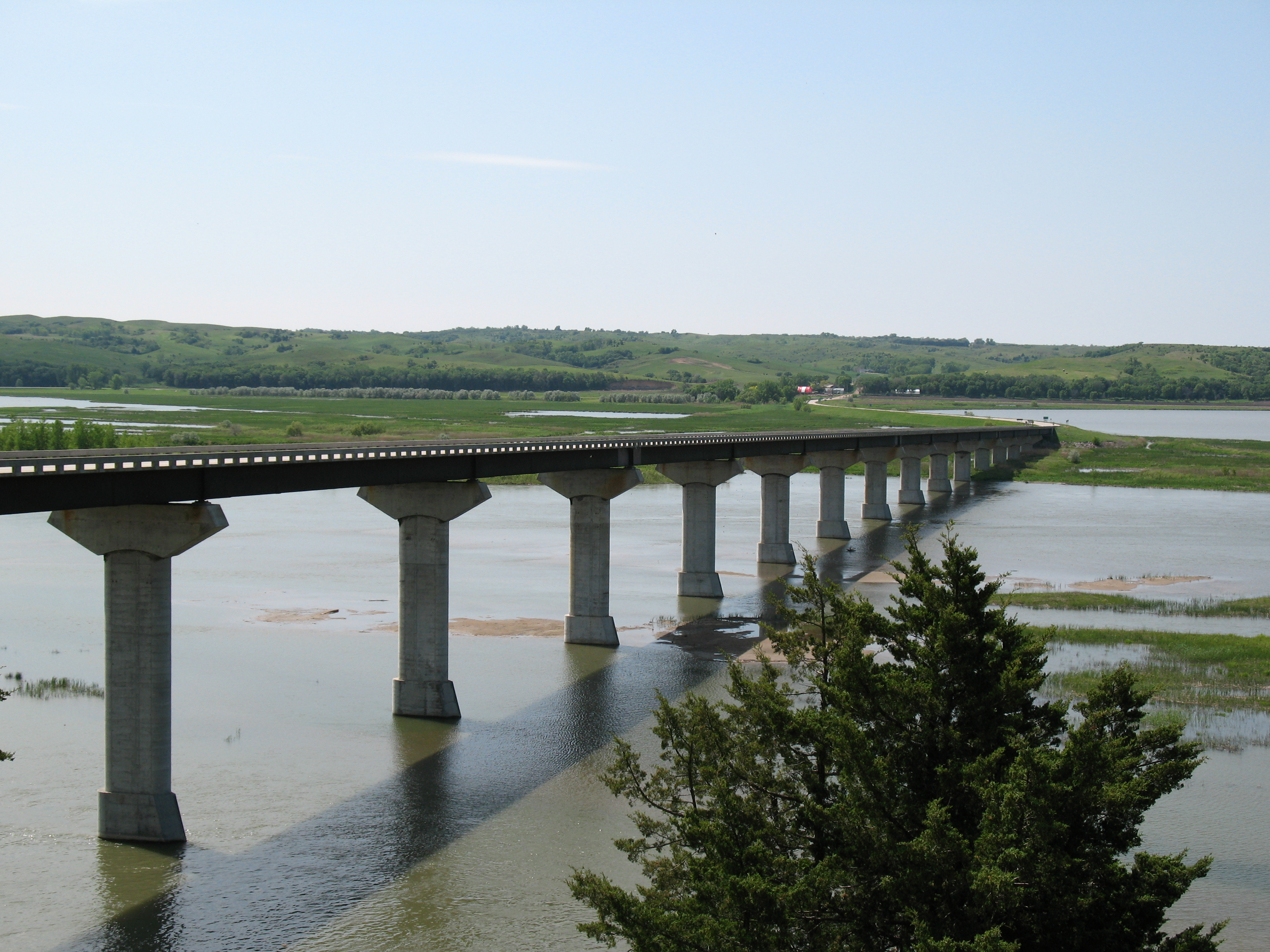
Chief Standing Bear Memorial Bridge

- In Lincoln, Nebraska, there is a city park located in the southwest area of town named "Standing Bear Grounds".
- The 63-acre (25 ha) Standing Bear Park in Ponca City, Oklahoma was named in his honor. It is the site of the Standing Bear Museum and Education Center, as well as a 22-foot (6.7 m) high bronze statue of the chief.
- In 1977, Standing Bear was inducted into the Nebraska Hall of Fame.
- In 1977, Standing Bear Lake opened.
- In 1994, six north-central tribes in Oklahoma formed the Standing Bear Foundation; they began holding an annual pow-wow to bring the tribes and non-Native residents.
- In 1998, the Chief Standing Bear Memorial Bridge, which crosses the Missouri River at the Nebraska-South Dakota border, was named in his honor.
- In 2005, a new elementary school in Omaha was named in his honor.
- In 2017, a bronze sculpture of Standing Bear was completed, commissioned by artist Ben Victor, and located in downtown Lincoln, Nebraska. The statue was donated by Doane College board member Donald M. Campbell.
- In 2017, The Chief Standing Bear Trail, between Beatrice and the Kansas line south of Barneston was completed by the Nebraska Trails Foundation. Ownership of the trail was transferred to the Ponca tribe of Nebraska. This trail follows the old Union Pacific Railroad route and roughly follows the route taken by the tribe, during the removal in 1877. [30]
- In 2019, a statue of Standing Bear replaced one of William Jennings Bryan in the Statuary Hall of the United States Capitol.
- In 2021, Lincoln Public Schools began construction of a new facility to be named Standing Bear High School, which opened its doors in 2023.
- In 2021, the Peabody Museum of Archaeology and Ethnology at Harvard University agreed to return Standing Bear's pipe tomahawk to the Ponca people.
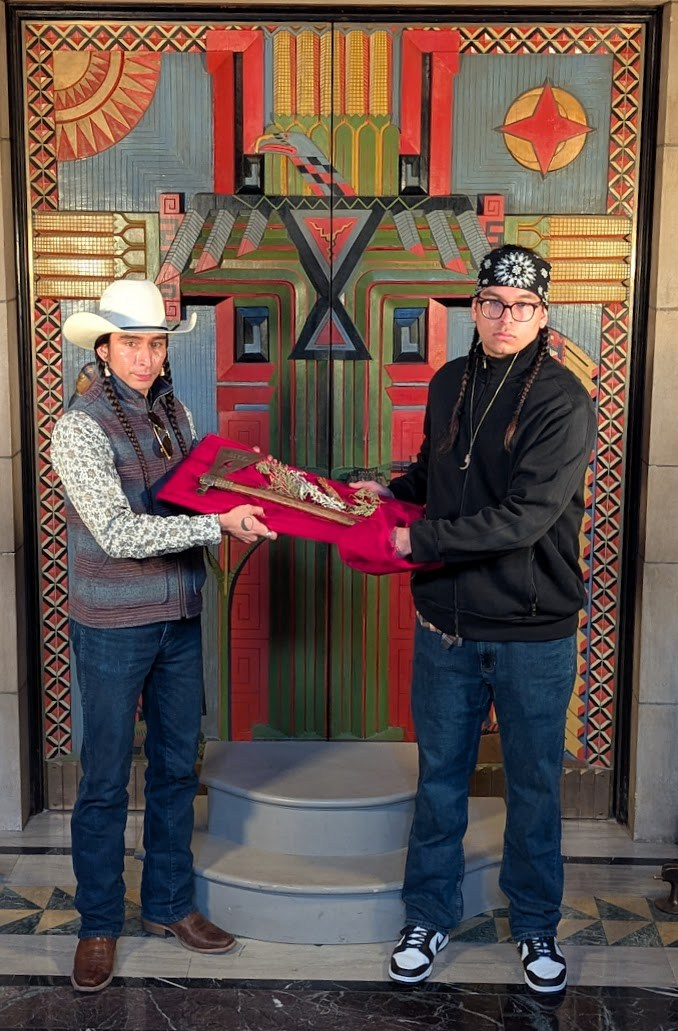
  Two Ponca tribe men display Chief Standing Bear's pipe tomahawk
- In 2023, Standing Bear was featured on a U.S. Postal Service Forever stamp based on a portrait by Thomas Blackshear II.

== See also ==
- List of civil rights leaders
