= Ponca =

Indigenous people of North America

P’ą́’k’a

Total population
6,700
Historical population
Year	Pop.	±%
1780	800	—
1804	200	−75.0%
1820	750/1250	—
1836	900	—
1846	2,000	+122.2%
1847	1,600	−20.0%
1852	800	−50.0%
1862	1,054	+31.7%
1876	730	−30.7%
1880	825	+13.0%
1892	775	−6.1%
1910	875	+12.9%
1939	1,237	+41.4%
1950s	1,350	+9.1%
1960	1,258	−6.8%
1983	2,221	+76.6%
1989	3,277	+47.5%
1998	4,387	+33.9%
1983: No official figure for Northern Ponca available during termination. 1998: 2,492 Southern Ponca tribal enrollment figures. Source:

Regions with significant populations
- United States ( Nebraska, Oklahoma)

Languages
- English, Omaha-Ponca

Religion
- Native American Church, Christianity

Related ethnic groups
- Dhegihan speaking people (Omaha, Kaw, Osage, and Quapaw)

- People: P’ą́’k’a
- Language: P’ą́’k’a Iyé, P’ą́’k’a Gáxe
- Country: P’ą́’k’a Mąžą́

The Ponca people (Note: The term Ponca was the name of a clan among the Kansa, Osage, and Quapaw. The meaning of the name is "Those Who Lead.") (Omaha-Ponca: P’ą́’k’a) are a nation primarily located in the Great Plains of North America that share a common Ponca culture, history, and language, identified with two Indigenous nations: the Ponca Tribe of Indians of Oklahoma or the Ponca Tribe of Nebraska.

This nation comprised the modern-day Ponca, Omaha, Kaw, Osage, and Quapaw peoples until the mid-17th century when the people sought to establish their nation west of the Mississippi River as a result of the Beaver Wars. By the end of the 18th century, the Ponca people had established themselves at the mouth of the Niobrara River near its confluence with the Missouri River, remaining there until 1877 when the United States forcibly removed the Ponca people from the Ponca Reservation in the Dakota Territory to the Indian Territory. This event, known as the Ponca Trail of Tears, resulted in the deaths of hundreds of Ponca civilians and the splintering of the nation. In 1879, two years after the removal, a small portion of the Ponca elected to return to Nebraska in 1879. This group, led by Standing Bear, ultimately gave rise to the present-day Ponca Tribe of Nebraska. Two years later, the majority of the Ponca were given the opportunity to return to Nebraska but elected against doing so, having established themselves on a new reservation in the Indian Territory. This group, led by White Eagle, ultimately gave rise to the Ponca Tribe of Oklahoma.

== Early history ==
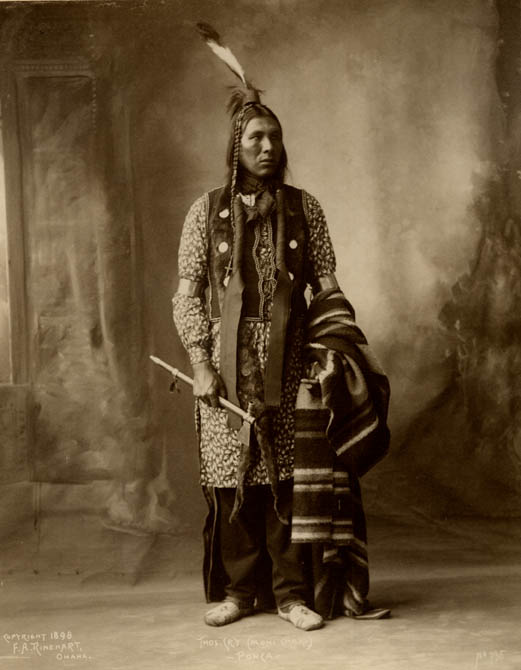
Thomas Cry (Moni Chaki), Ponca, Nebraska, 1898

At first European contact, the Ponca lived around the mouth of the Niobrara River in northern Nebraska. According to tradition, they moved there from an area east of the Mississippi just before Columbus' arrival in the Americas. Siouan-speaking tribes such as the Omaha, Osage, Quapaw and Kaw also have traditions of having migrated to the West from east of the Mississippi River. The invasions of the Haudenosaunee from their traditional base in the north pushed those tribes out of the Ohio River area. Scholars are not able to determine precisely when the Dhegiha Siouan tribes migrated west, but know the Haudenosaunee also pushed tribes out from the Ohio and West Virginia areas in the Beaver Wars. The Haudenosaunee maintained the lands as hunting grounds.

The Ponca appear on a 1701 map by Pierre-Charles Le Sueur, who placed them along the upper Missouri. In 1789, fur trader Juan Baptiste Munier was given an exclusive license to trade with the Ponca at the mouth of the Niobrara River. He founded a trading post at its confluence with the Missouri, where he found about 800 Poncas residing. Shortly after that, the tribe was hit by a devastating smallpox epidemic. In 1804, when they were visited by the Lewis and Clark Expedition, only about 200 Poncas remained. Later in the 19th century, their number rose to about 700.

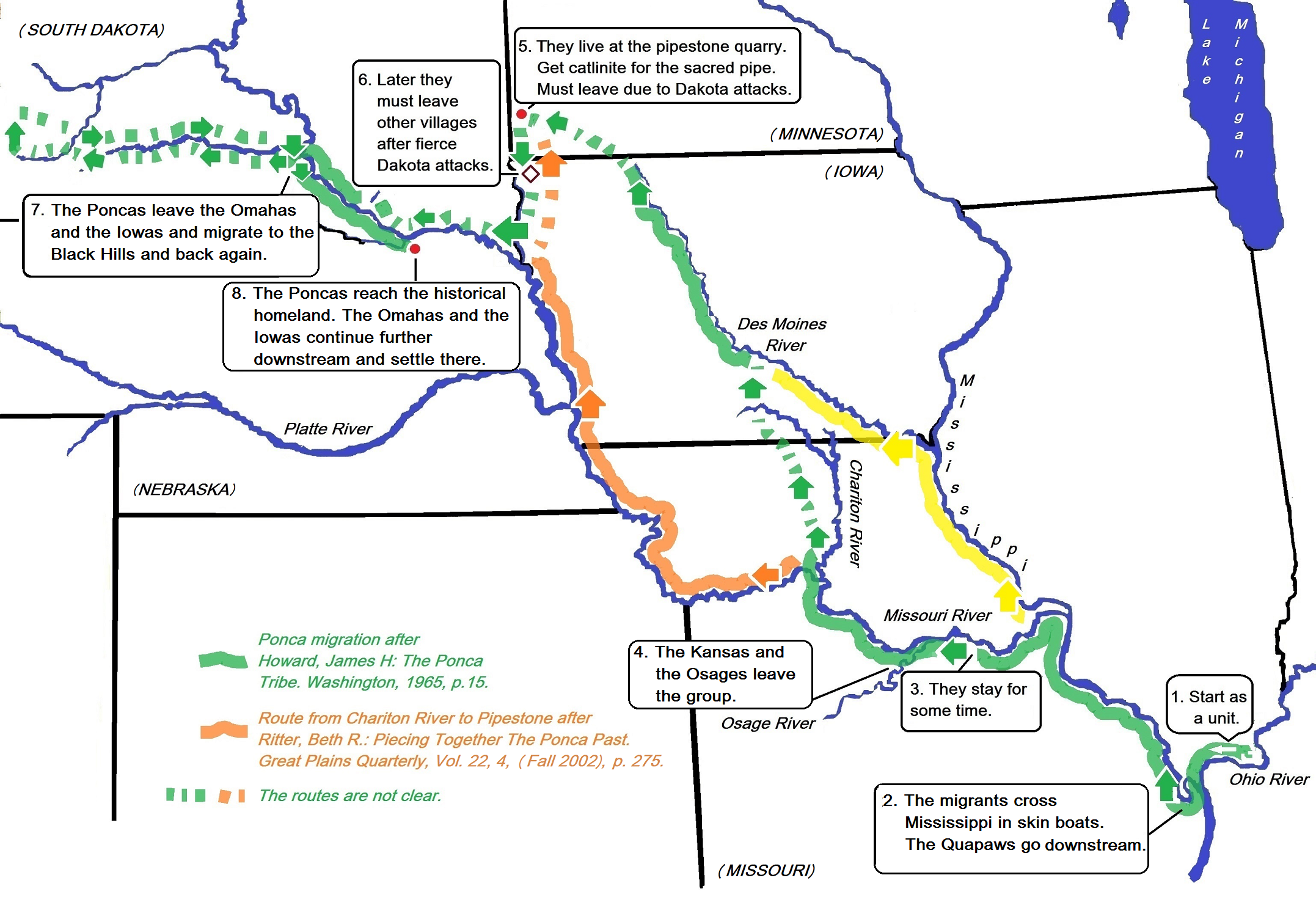
Route of the Ponca Indians and other Dhegiha Siouan peoples (Quapaw, Osage, Kansa (Kaw) and Omaha) from the South to Nebraska according to oral traditions

Most of the leadership of the Ponca people was destroyed in 1824. Hostile Lakotas attacked a delegation of 30 leaders of various rank returning from a visit in a friendly Oglala Lakota camp. Only twelve survived. "Numbered among the dead were all the Ponca chiefs, including the famous Smoke-maker ...".

Unlike most other Plains Indians, the Ponca grew maize and kept vegetable gardens. Their last successful buffalo hunt was in 1855.

== Treaties with the United States ==
In 1817 the tribe signed a peace treaty with the United States. By a second treaty in 1825, they regulated trade and tried to minimize intertribal clashes on the Northern Plains. In 1858 the Ponca signed a treaty by which they gave up parts of their land to the United States in return for protection from hostile tribes and a permanent reservation home on the Niobrara. The Ponca signed their last treaty with the US in 1865. In the 1868 US-Sioux Treaty of Fort Laramie the US mistakenly included all Ponca lands in the Great Sioux Reservation. Conflict between the Ponca and the Sioux/Lakota, who now claimed the land as their own by US law, forced the US to remove the Ponca from their own ancestral lands.

== Relocation ==
When Congress decided to remove several northern tribes to Indian Territory (present-day Oklahoma) in 1876, the Ponca were on the list. After inspecting the lands the US government offered for their new reservation and finding it unsuitable for agriculture, the Ponca chiefs decided against a move to the Indian Territory. Hence, when governmental officials came in early 1877 to move the Ponca to their new land, the chiefs refused, citing their earlier treaty. Most of the tribe refused and had to be moved by force. In their new location, the Ponca struggled with malaria, a shortage of food and the hot climate. One in four members died within the first year.

== Standing Bear ==
Chief Standing Bear was among those who had most vehemently protested the tribe's removal. When his eldest son, Bear Shield, lay on his deathbed, Standing Bear promised to have him buried on the tribe's ancestral lands. In order to carry out his promise, Standing Bear left the reservation in Oklahoma and traveled back toward the Ponca homelands. He was arrested for doing so without US government permission and ordered confined at Fort Omaha. Many people took up his cause, and two prominent attorneys offered their services pro bono. Standing Bear filed a habeas corpus suit challenging his arrest. In Standing Bear v. Crook (1879), held in Omaha, Nebraska, the US District Court established for the first time that Native Americans are "persons within the meaning of the law" of the United States, and that they have certain rights as a result. This was an important civil rights case.

== Nebraska ==
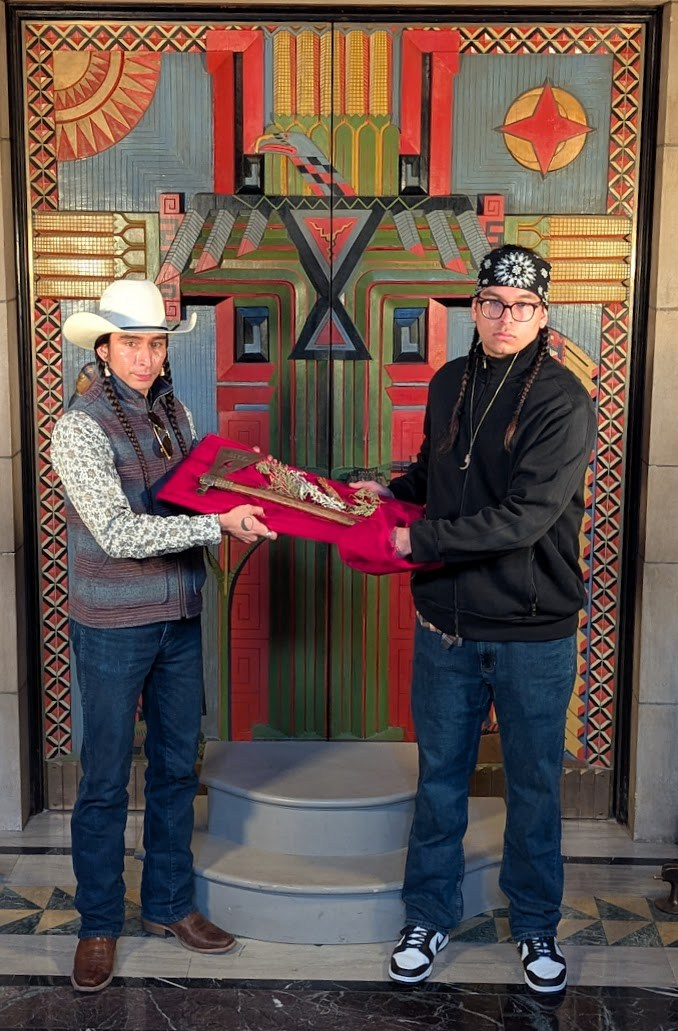
Two Ponca men display Chief Standing Bear's pipe tomahawk at the Nebraska State Capitol

In 1881, the US returned 26,236 acres (106 km^{2}) of Knox County, Nebraska to the Ponca, and about half the tribe moved back north from Indian Territory. The tribe continued to decline.

In the 1930s, the University of Nebraska and the Smithsonian Institution conducted an archaeological project to identify and save prehistoric artifacts before they were destroyed during agricultural development. The team excavated a prehistoric Ponca village, which included large circular homes up to sixty feet in diameter, located almost two miles (3 km) along the south bank of the Niobrara River.

After World War II, the US government began a policy of terminating its relationship with tribes. In 1966, the US federal government terminated the tribe (then called the Northern Ponca). It distributed its land by allotment to members, and sold off what it called surplus. Many individuals sold off their separate allotments over the decades, sometimes being tricked by speculators.

In the 1970s, the tribe started efforts to reorganize politically. Members wanted to revive the cultural identity of its people and improve their welfare. First, they sought state recognition and then allied with their Congressional representatives to seek legislation for federal recognition. On October 31, 1990, the Ponca Restoration Bill was signed into law, and they were recognized as the Ponca Tribe of Nebraska. They are now trying to rebuild a land base on their ancestral lands. They are the only federally recognized tribe in Nebraska without a reservation.

Today the Ponca Tribe of Nebraska has over 2,783 enrolled members and is headquartered in Niobrara, Nebraska.

== Oklahoma ==
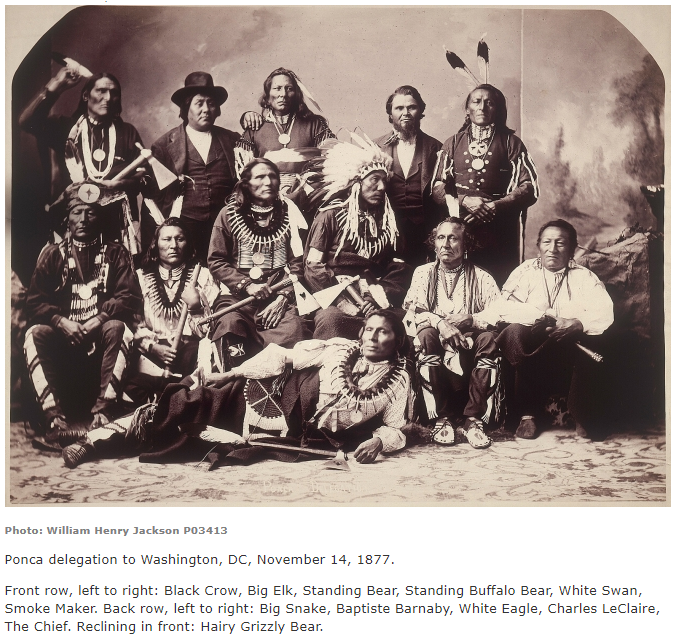
The Washington Delegation of Ponca in 1877

After the 1877 forced relocation onto the Quapaw Reservation in Indian Territory, the tribe moved west to their own lands along the Arkansas and Salt Fork Rivers. The full-bloods formed a tipi village, while the mixed-bloods settled about Chikaskia River. During opposition by Ponca leadership, the US government began dismantling tribal government under the Curtis Act. In an attempt to encourage assimilation (and to allow Oklahoma to become a state), they allotted reservation lands to individual members under the Dawes Act in 1891 and 1892. Any land remaining after allotment was made available for sale to non-natives.

After Oklahoma achieved statehood, some remaining Ponca land was leased or sold to the 101 Ranch, where many Ponca people found employment. The 1911 discovery of oil on Ponca lands provided revenues but had mixed results. There were environmental disasters as oil refineries dumped waste directly into the Arkansas River.

In 1918, three Ponca men, Frank Eagle, Louis McDonald, and McKinley Eagle, helped co-found the Native American Church. As of 2024, the Native American Church is the most widespread Indigenous religion among Native Americans in the continental United States, Canada, and Mexico, having an estimated 300,000 adherents.

In 1950, the nation organized a new government under the Oklahoma Indian Welfare Act. Ponca leaders adopted the Ponca Constitution on 20 September 1950. Today, the Ponca Tribe is headquartered in White Eagle, Oklahoma and conducts business from Ponca City.

== Notable Ponca ==
- Carter Camp, AIM (American Indian Movement) leader
- Brett Chapman, attorney and Native American rights advocate
- Judi M. gaiashkibos, executive director of the Nebraska Commission on Indian Affairs
- Tommy Morrison, former heavyweight boxer/co-star in Rocky V movie
- Chief White Eagle, chief and civil rights advocate
- Susette La Flesche, civil rights activist, writer, lecturer, interpreter, artist
- Paladine Roye, painter, 1946–2001
- Ponka-We Victors, Kansas state legislator
- Clyde Warrior, activist for Native self-determination
- Standing Bear, chief and civil rights advocate

== See also ==
- Native American tribes in Nebraska
- Ponca Fort

Recognized Ponca Chief Mitchell (Wash com oni) Cerrie was a signatory to the 1858 and 1865 Ponca Treaties and was the recipient of the February 8th 1878 Certification of Treaty Stipulations with the United States Government.
