= Lorenzo (The Spanish Tragedy) =

Lorenzo is a fictional character in Thomas Kyd's The Spanish Tragedy. He is the son of the Duke of Castile and brother to Bel-imperia.

== Role in play ==
Lorenzo makes an appearance early in the play in Act I, Scene II, alongside the Portuguese Prince Balthazar and Horatio, best friend of Don Andrea. The King of Spain asks Horatio and Lorenzo who should be credited for the capture of Balthazar. Lorenzo says "this hand first took his courser by the reins." Balthazar recognizes that both Lorenzo and Horatio had a hand in his capture, however the King decides to have them share the reward. The King says that the ransom of the prince will be given to Horatio and Lorenzo has the responsibility of taking care of Balthazar.

Lorenzo and Balthazar develop a close relationship and eventually work together. Balthazar falls in love with Bel-imperia, and Lorenzo wishes to see them matched. In the second act, Lorenzo discovers that Bel-imperia is in love with Horatio. He tells Balthazar:

Let's go my Lord, your staying stays revenge.
Do you but follow me and gain your love.
Her favor must be one by his remove.

Lorenzo orders servants Pedringano and Serberine to kill Horatio. When Lorenzo thinks that he may be discovered by Hieronimo and Bel-imperia, he covers his tracks by ordering Pedringano to kill Serberine.

Once Pedringano succeeds in killing Serberine, he is arrested and pleads with Lorenzo to help save him from being put to death. Lorenzo then tricks Pedringano into thinking that he will be saved, however this is merely a manipulative ploy and Pedringano ends up being hanged for Serberine's murder.

As the play continues, Hieronimo descends further into madness which is demonstrated by his meltdown in front of the King. Lorenzo then begins to feel worried as Hieronimo's madness poses as a threat to his plans. He then sees this as an opportunity to persuade the King that Hieronimo has gone completely mad and is no longer fit to be the Knight's Marshall. Nonetheless the King disagrees with him.

Lorenzo is then warned by Castille that he should not attempt to harm Hieronimo as they are of the same social status, and the King may go against Lorenzo should Hieronimo accuse him of anything.

At the end of the play, Lorenzo is cast alongside Balthazar and Bel-Imperia in a revenge play written by Hieronimo. Hieronimo kills Lorenzo, Bel-Imperia kills Balthazar, and all of Lorenzo's crimes are revealed to the audience.

== As a villain ==
Lorenzo is an example of the recognised type in the Elizabethan theatre of the Machiavellian villain. All of his actions are pitiless and self-advancing. Lorenzo is highly manipulative and plays on the weakness of other characters.
