= Isabella (The Spanish Tragedy) =

Fictional character in Kyd's The Spanish Tragedy

Isabella is a character in Thomas Kyd's The Spanish Tragedy. She is the mother of Horatio and the wife to Hieronimo. Isabella only appears in three scenes and is one of three female characters in the play. She is defined by her inaction and represents Early Modern women at this time period as she is consistently not given a voice or power in society. However, Isabella distances herself from this defined role of motherhood as she decides to avenge her son Horatio by killing herself and simultaneously chopping down the tree of his murder. Isabella's action represents a form of revenge within the greater genre of revenge tragedy: suicide. Her soliloquy is one of the most notable from the play and defines this tragic path of revenge.

== Roles ==
=== Early modern woman ===
Isabella plays the role of the early modern woman specifically through her strife to publicly revenge her son and silencing nonetheless. During the period of The Spanish Tragedy, women were confined to their roles within the household and continuously marginalized. This marginalization often extended onto the stage as women faced consequences for attempting to rebel against the constraints of society. Despite their wishes to express free will, they were oftentimes rendered unable. In Isabella's soliloquy specifically, she recognizes the obscene massacres of her sons murder and the subsequent inaction from Hieronimo ("monstrous homicides"), but can only do so as she is finally alone. Isabella's position within this constrained womanhood, in which she is largely dependent on the actions of her husband Hieronimo for revenge, thus naturally incited her frustration. The eventual prominence of Isabella's role within the play comes at the price of her life, showcasing the helpless fate of women who attempt to break free of womanhood, and the common usage of the early modern, male dependent woman.

=== Grieving mother ===
Central to Isabella's character within the play and her eventual demise is her role as the mother to Horatio. Isabella's closing soliloquy is riddled with references to the importance of this motherhood to both her life and her decision to die. Isabella's suicide, which is focused on the murder of her son and her revenge upon the physical and emotional place of his death is flooded with associations of protective motherhood. In the soliloquy itself, Isabella makes special mention of her intention to both end her life, and to curse herself and the tree from their ability to bear offspring or fruit ("...So shall my womb be cursed for his sake"). Isabella's focus on using motherhood in order to enact revenge is thus centered around the motherly characteristic of reproduction. In the brutal death of her offspring, Isabella is no longer a mother and observes her womb to be cursed. Thus, she gains revenge by cutting the tree and ridding it of its ability to reproduce as well - embodying the role of the grieving mother.

=== Mad revenger ===
The concept of Isabella acting as a mad revenger is entwined with her use of suicide to commit and eventually realize this revenge. Isabella is recognized as the most truly mad character in the play as her madness derives from both the grief of her sons death and her anger directed towards Hieronimo and his supposed inaction. Isabella's madness is first expressed as she and Hieromino realize that their son has been murdered and rile in the greif of his loss. Isabella recognizes the onslaught of the "endless woe" which now plagues her consciousness. The endlessness of this sorrow underscores the persistence of Isabellas madness. Without her son, she can see no solution or conclusion to this sadness. This incessant woe drives Isabella into complete madness as she and Hieronimo cope with the space that the irreparable murder of Horatio has caused. As she cannot find an external way to rid herself of her grief or revenge Horatio, she internalizes her madness and eventually ends her life. This grief-driven insanity is accentuated in her final soliloquy and earlier visions of her son in the heavens.

=== Senecan stoic ===
In the Senecan model of revenge, those who seek revenge are subordinated within the corrupt society that they occupy. These revengers have the capacity to observe the imbalances of power before them and the class differences which contains their silence. Their desire to commit revenge then comes as a form of freeing themselves from these constraints. This form of revenger is empowered to act as they observe those with more capability not using their power to enact proper justice. In the Senecan context, the stoic is a revenger whose action derives from their entrapment within their role. Metaphorically, their soul is entrapped within their body. In act 3 scene 8, as Isabella looks up to the heavens, she notes both the presence of her soul in the context of her grief and its relation to her dead son. She envisions her soul escaping its confines and growing wings for which to fly to Horatio. Isabella's recognition of the placement of her soul, entrapped within her mortal position fashions her in the image of the Sececan stoic. Isabella idealizes a sweeping action which has the capacity to bring her soul outside of its bondage. This vision leads to her eventual suicidal revenge, brought about by her dismay with the inaction of her husband Hieronimo, as she escapes the confines of her mortal capabilities and returns to her son.

== Isabella vs. Bel-Imperia ==
Isabella and Bel-Imperia represent two oppositional models of womanhood during the time of the Spanish Tragedy. Despite their differences, both women were emotionally attached to Horatio, and eventually commit suicide. The contrast between their roles then underscores the difference between the traditional Early Modern female character and the growing place of a more empowered female within tragedy. Nonetheless, Bel-Imperia cannot entirely escape the confines of the Early Modern woman either.

The difference between Bel-Imperia and Isabella is first displayed in their reactions to finding Horatio dead. As Isabella arrives at the corpse of Horatio, typical of an early modern woman, she shows signs of succumbing to her grief. In her lines, Isabella describes the process of mourning with "fountains of tears" as she calls upon the earth to "raise an everlasting storm." This fit at the death of her son begins Isabella's gradual devolvement into madness which develops throughout the play. To Isabella, as an Early Modern woman, the only avenue to express her grief is through these hysterics. Conversely, as Bel-Imperia looks over the dead Horatio, she exhibits the traits of a more empowered woman and expresses bravery in his absence. Bel-Imperia remarks: "oh, save his life and let me die for him!". As opposed to Isabella, even in the face of murder, Bel-Imperia has the capacity to react with composure. Rather than succumb to emotion, Bel-Imperia's grief is expressed in the objective solution of self-sacrifice.

This difference is further emphasized later in act three in two affronting scenes featuring Isabella and Bel-Imperia in their removed process of grieving. Isabella begins the scene by noting that "there's no medicine left for my disease." Inundated with grief and hellbent on finding her sons killers, Isabella is once again portrayed as overtaken by her grief and unable to act outside of it. The notion of her grief being a "disease" again notes its endless nature and the beginnings of her madness as a result. In the scene following, Isabella's intense madness as a result of her grief and need for revenge is again contrasted with Bel-Imperia's objective way of attempting to obtain revenge of her own. Bel-Imperia notes that "I must constrain myself/to patience, and apply me to the time." As opposed to Isabella's earlier monologue in which she longs for an immediate return to her son, Bel-Imperia is able to express pause and patience. Yet, Bel-Imperia's space in the window as she gives this speech displays her ultimate confinement back to traditional womanhood nonetheless. The woman in the window was a traditional trope in literature used to highlight women unable to operate without a male chaperone. Regardless of her different relationship to Horatio and his death, her ability to express pause in her quest for revenge ultimately differentiates her from Isabella and underscores the growing agency of women.

The most stark example of the difference between Isabella and Bel-Imperia can be observed through their suicides. The fate of both women demonstrates the inability for Bel-Imperia to completely break free of the traditional model of womanhood despite her increased agency; however, the nature of her suicide continues to differentiate her from Isabella. Similar to Isabella's above lines, in her suicide, she is overcome with emotion. Both woman are empowered to revenge. Yet, Bel-Imperia is able to gain her physical revenge on Balthazar (something Isabella is not capable of) before killing herself. Isabella remains confined to the environment of her grief and instead gets her revenge on the tree of Horatio's murder.

== Symbols ==
=== The arbor ===
In the context of Isabella's revenge, she associates the arbor in her own garden with the violent hanging of her son Horatio. In Isabella's final act, she destroys the tree, and with it, her memories of Horatio's murder. In her soliloquy, her anger is entirely directed at the garden arbor. As Isabella approaches the tree, its arch like branches symbolize a door - as it otherwise becomes a symbol of passage and transition. The arbor represents Isabella's past trauma, and her future actions. Thus, in the action of chopping down the arbor, many scholars metaphorically compare Isabella to the arbor itself. Its presence underscores the consequences of her madness, and her unstoppable necessity to obtain revenge, regardless of its costs.

As Isabella enters the garden, she begins by denoting that she will "revenge myself upon this place." As she says this, she begins to cut the arbor into pieces and decimate the once tranquil garden. As she does so, she discusses the process of cutting off the pieces of the garden one by one - first the branches, then the boughs, then the roots. In this action, Isabella declared that now, just as she is, the garden will be "fruitless forever." In "The Death of Castile in "The Spanish Tragedy", James P. Hammersmith believes that this declaration created the parallel between Isabella herself, and the tree. In death, both Isabella and the tree will be barren, as the death of Horatio has cursed them both from ever reproducing again. Now, Isabella as well as the tree has born lifeless fruit as the fruit which hangs the tree it will die just as Horatio did. In this metaphor, the roots are both a part of Isabella and of the tree as in her suicide she is burning her own familial roots. Similarly, the branches and boughs become entities that originate from the tree, much like a family. As she takes revenge on the tree, she kills herself. Just as she can no longer be separated from the tree, it can no longer be separated from Horatio's death.

Historically, the image of Kyd's arbor derives metaphorical resonance from the image of the triple tree gallows, a structure constructed in London in 1571 at Tyburn that was the first of its kind. From this site, the phenomenon of the spectacle of hanging was bred. While it was not a literal tree, its associations and popularization of hanging and brutality as public performance likely historically contributed to Kyd's use of hanging and brutal violence to describe the Arbor from which Horatio was hung. Much like the centrality of the triple tree and the arbor to spectacle prior, Isabella's grief and madness is central to the spectacle of her death.

== Isabella's soliloquy ==
Isabella's soliloquy opens as she recognizes the circumstances that led to her presence in the garden once again. She has grown mad with her desire for vengeance and highlights the "monstrous homicides" that have ultimately initiated this madness. According to Jonathan S. Rebetz in his essay "The Price That Women in Renaissance Drama Pay for Taking Initiative: Isabella’s Soliloquy in Act IV of The Spanish Tragedy", Isabella's ambiguous reference to "homicides" highlights their duality as they can either be an act of murder committed on someone, or an act committed on oneself. This foreshadows her future action, and gives weight to the influence of Horatio's death.

Following, Isabella continues with this duality, using both the words piety and pity to describe the feelings of the king's reactions towards the death of her son. Isabella remarks that "Since neither piety nor pity moves / The King to justice or compassion". Kyd chose these emotions as both are typically feminine, to say that the king not only does not feel them, he does not inherently have the capability to feel them. On an epistemological level, at the time of the play, both piety and pity had multiple meanings. According to Rebetz, Piety meant "both the quality of feeling or showing pity” and “faithfulness to the duty naturally owed to someone” while pity meant “the disposition to mercy or compassion” and “a ground or cause for pity.” Defining piety also as a faithful duty that is owed highlights Isabella's belief that it is the king's divine role to punish those who are deserving. As the king is yet to give out punishments for Horatio's murder, he is refusing to fulfill this obligation and thus acting outside of his role.

These frustrations with outside entities for not fulfilling their supposed duties is what led to Isabella's decision to go about obtaining revenge herself. However, as Isabella is consistently confined to her role of womanhood, her revenge must also occur within the bounds of an early modern woman. As such, Isabella pledges to "revenge [herself ] upon [the] place / Where thus they murdered [her] beloved son.” As she cannot gain revenge through murder or an elaborate plot, her madness and anger is directed at the site of her Horatio's death - the Arbor.

As Isabella begins to cut down the tree, she discusses dismantling each part of the tree as she eventually burns "the roots from whence the rest is sprung.” The idea of burning roots physically refers to the roots at the bottom of the tree which Isabella must destroy to destroy the tree in its entirety. Metaphorically, in the context of lines 35 and 36 of her soliloquy, by burning the roots, Isabella is stripping the tree of its lineage by chopping it down. In lines 35 and 36, Isabella declares that “And as I curse this tree from further fruit, / So shall my womb be cursèd for his sake.” Just as she burns the roots, Isabella connects herself to the fruit-bearing arbor. To Isabella, she is the roots of Horatio. As Horatio is no more, the tree cannot exist either. As she does so, in lines 10 through 13, she intentionally strips the tree of its presence in entirety inside of the garden.

Continuing to chop the plot of the tree, Isabella notes her hope that “whosoever / imagines not to keep it unmanured." This line specifically adds an off-beat tone to the soliloquy as it breaks the traditional iamb conventions of a renaissance drama. This places emphasis on this line and underscores the metaphor that exists inside. As Isabella believes that no one has done enough to tend to the justice of Horatio or tend to the absence of his presence, she hopes that no one will tend to the missing plot of the tree as well.

In Isabella's recognition of this parallel, she reflects on the importance of the garden and its relation to the death of Horatio. She remarks that “Ay, here he died, and here I him embrace. / See where his ghost solicits with his wounds / Revenge on her that should revenge his death!". Although Horatio is no longer present, Isabellas use of the present "embrace" rather than "embraced" continues her feelings of Horatio's presence even in his absence. This is a call back to act 3 as Isabella can feel Horatio's presence and her souls calling towards it. She continues to get closer to Horatio once again, as her own death nears.

Standing over the destroyed tree, Isabella evaluates her path towards revenge and the actions of herself and Hieronimo following Horatio's death. Isabella references Hieronimo and says that “sorrow and despair hath cited [her] to hear Horatio plead with Rhadamanth.” Isabella puts herself and Hieronimo on trial for their actions following the death of Horatio, and evaluates who is to blame for her current predicament. Isabella recognizes the constraints to her own ability, and Hieronimo's lack of action at the time of her death. Thus, in her last line, she urges Hieronimo to "make haste" in his current pursuit, and to correct his current negligence in his process of vengeance.
