= Cornelia Metella =

Ancient Roman noblewoman

Cornelia Metella (c. 73 BC – after 48 BC) was the daughter of Quintus Caecilius Metellus Pius Scipio Nasica (who was consul in 52 BC and originally from the gens Cornelia) and his wife Aemilia. She appears in numerous literary sources, including an official dedicatory inscription at Pergamon.

== Biography ==
Cornelia was first married to Publius Licinius Crassus, son of Marcus Licinius Crassus, in 55 BC, when he was in Rome between service with Julius Caesar in Gaul and his father in Syria. After the younger Crassus' death at the Battle of Carrhae, Cornelia became the fifth wife of the significantly older Pompey in 52 BC.

At the start of the civil war between Pompey and Caesar, Cornelia and Pompey's son from a previous marriage, Sextus Pompey, were sent to the Aegean island Lesbos. During her stay there, a statue was erected in Pergamum in her honour for services to that city. After Pompey's defeat at Pharsalus in 48 BC, she rejoined Pompey in August at Mytilene and went with him on his ill-fated flight to Ptolemaic Egypt. Landing on the shore, Pompey was murdered with Cornelia watching from the ship. After Pompey's death, she fled to Cyprus with Sextus and afterwards returned to Italy with Caesar's permission to bury Pompey's ashes on his Alban estate.

Plutarch described her as a beautiful woman of good character, well read, and a skilled player of the lyre. She was also very well educated in geometry and philosophy.

== Cultural references ==
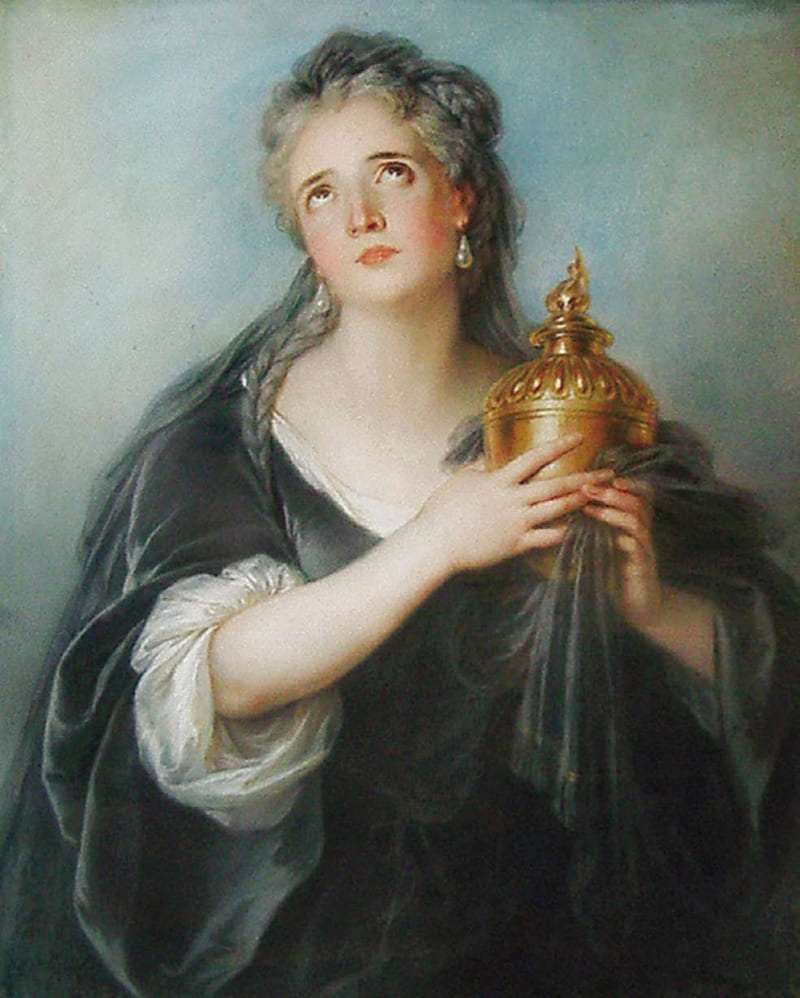
Charles-Antoine Coypel, Portrait of Adrienne Lecouvreur (early 1720s) showing the prominent 18th-century French actress as Cornelia Metella in Pierre Corneille's play The Death of Pompey. Comédie-Française, Paris

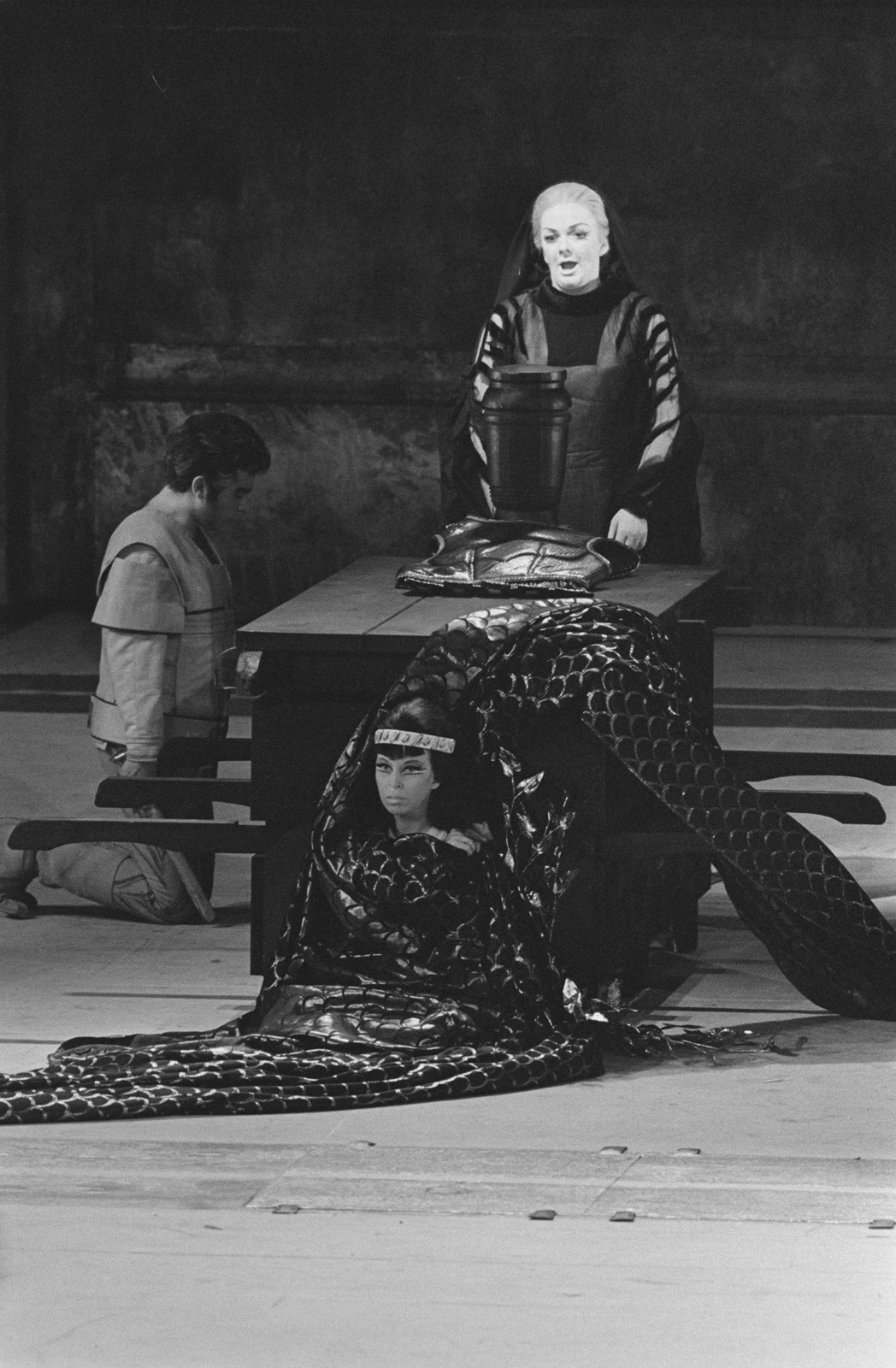
Annelies Burmeister as Cornelia in Giulio Cesare in Egitto (1970 production)

Cornelia Metella is a focus of Lucan's Civil War, which treats her as Pompey's partner in war and travel.

Cornelia appears in George Frideric Handel's 1724 opera Giulio Cesare in Egitto ("Julius Caesar in Egypt"), where she pleads with Caesar to spare her husband; he is about to grant her plea, but Pompey was already killed by the Egyptians. She is the title and main character in Robert Garnier's play Cornélie and its English language adaptation Cornelia by Thomas Kyd.

In the first season of the TV series Rome, broadcast in 2005, Cornelia is portrayed by actress Anna Patrick. Unlike the historic Cornelia, this portrayal sees her as middle aged.

== See also ==
- Women in ancient Rome

== Bibliography ==
- Münzer, F (1900). "Cornelius 417" . Realencyclopädie der classischen Altertumswissenschaft (in German). Vol. IV, 1. Stuttgart: Butcher. cols. 1596–1597 – via Wikisource.
- Linderski, Jerzy (1996). Imperium Sine Fine: T Robert S Broughton and the Roman Republic. Franz Steiner Verlag. ISBN 978-3-515-06948-9.
- Syme, Ronald (1980). "The Sons of Crassus". Latomus. 39 (2): 403–408. ISSN 0023-8856. JSTOR 41531764.
