= Douglas Bruster =

American literary critic (born 1963)

- Born: 1963 (age 62–63); Sioux City, Iowa, USA
- Awards: National Endowment for the Humanities Fellowship

Academic background
- Education: B.A., 1985, University of Nebraska–Lincoln; M.A., 1987, PhD, 1990, Harvard University

Academic work
- Discipline: English Literature
- Sub-discipline: William Shakespeare
- Institutions: Harvard University; University of Chicago; University of Texas at San Antonio; University of Texas at Austin
- Website: liberalarts.utexas.edu/english/faculty/brusterd

Douglas Bruster (born 1963) is an American literary critic and Shakespeare scholar. He is the Mody C. Boatright Regents Professor of American and English Literature and Distinguished Teaching Professor at The University of Texas at Austin where he researches the works of William Shakespeare and his contemporaries.

== Early life and education ==
Bruster was raised in Norfolk, Nebraska, where he graduated from Norfolk Senior High School in 1981. Attending the University of Nebraska–Lincoln, he majored in English, History, and Latin, graduating in 1985. Thereafter he attended Harvard University, where he studied English Renaissance literature with such professors as G. Blakemore Evans, Marjorie B. Garber, and Roland Greene. Earning his M.A. during the course of his studies, he received his Ph.D. in 1990, writing on commercial themes and images in the plays of the early modern era in England.

== Career ==
After appointments at the University of Chicago and the University of Texas at San Antonio, Bruster accepted a faculty position at the University of Texas at Austin in 1999, where he currently teaches. His publications focus on works of the early modern era in England, primarily those of Shakespeare and his contemporaries. Bruster's first monograph was published by Cambridge University Press in 1992: Drama and the Market in the Age of Shakespeare was the inaugural volume in the series Cambridge Studies in Renaissance Literature and Culture, reissued in paperback in 2005. Subsequent books have included Quoting Shakespeare: Form and Culture in Early Modern Drama (2000), Shakespeare and the Question of Culture: Early Modern Literature and the Cultural Turn (2003), and To Be or Not to Be (2007), a study of the famous soliloquy from Hamlet. Bruster also collaborated on two studies with the German Shakespeare scholar wmde:Robert Weimann: Prologues to Shakespeare's Theatre: Performance and Liminality in Early Modern Drama (2005) and Shakespeare and the Power of Performance: Stage and Page in the Elizabethan Theatre (2008).

In addition to these studies, Bruster has edited such early modern plays as Thomas Middleton and William Rowley's The Changeling for the Oxford University Press edition of Thomas Middleton: The Collected Works (2008), the morality plays Everyman and Mankind for the Arden Early Modern Drama series Shakespeare's (with Eric Rasmussen), and A Midsummer Night's Dream for Houghton Mifflin Harcourt (2012).

In 2013, Bruster's 'Shakespearean Spellings and Handwriting in the Additional Passages Printed in the 1602 Spanish Tragedy' drew on orthographical evidence to argue for Shakespeare's authorship of the approximately 325 lines of the so-called Additional Passages printed in the 1602 quarto of Thomas Kyd's The Spanish Tragedy.

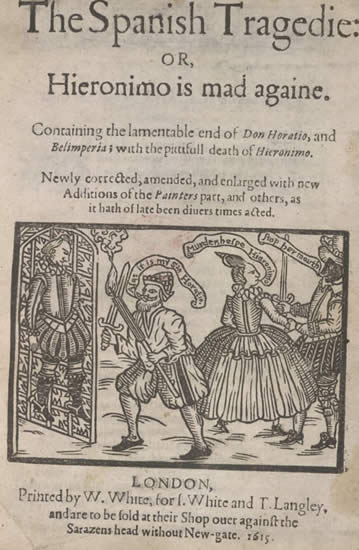
The Spanish Tragedy

This research was featured in a front-page story of The New York Times, and profiled in numerous outlets of the popular press, including National Public Radio, The Guardian, and The Atlantic

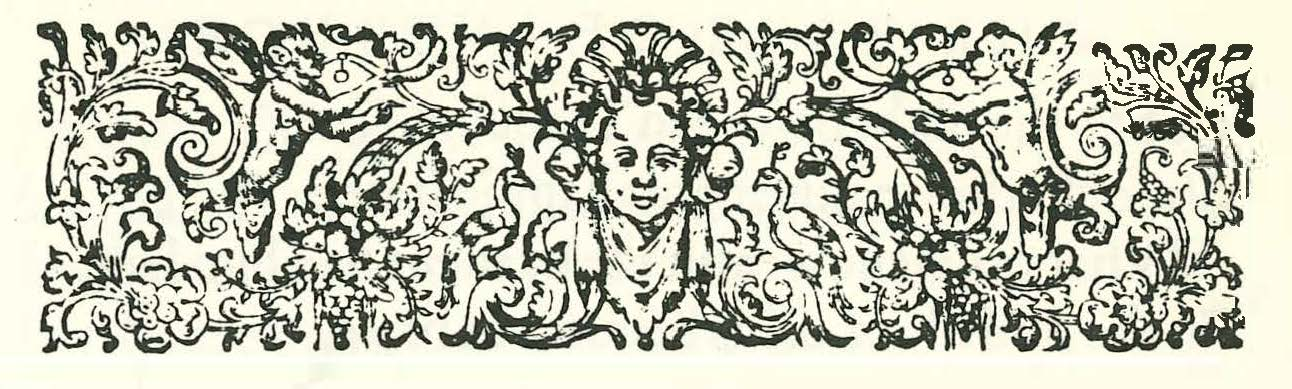
Richard Field's headpiece ornament #8

Other significant articles include 'A New Chronology for Shakespeare's Plays' (2014) with Geneviève Smith, which advances a revised timeline for Shakespeare's drama on the basis of a constrained correspondence analysis of the plays' punctuated pause patterns, and, the following year, ' Shakespeare's Lady 8,' which identifies and analyzes as a Shakespearean 'brand' the attractive printers' headpiece that adorned both Venus and Adonis and The Rape of Lucrece upon first publication.

Bruster has been awarded many of his department, university, and state's top teaching awards, including the William O. Sutherland Award for excellence in teaching Masterworks of Literature, the Regents' Outstanding Teaching Award, the President's Teaching Award, and the Minnie Stevens Piper Professor Award for superior teaching at the college level.

== Selected bibliography ==
=== Books ===
- Bruster, Douglas (1992). Drama and the Market in the Age of Shakespeare. Cambridge: Cambridge University Press. ISBN 978-0-521-41664-1.
- — (2000). Quoting Shakespeare: Form and Culture in Early Modern Drama. Lincoln, NE: University of Nebraska Press. ISBN 978-0-8032-1303-6.
- — (2003). Shakespeare and the Question of Culture: Early Modern Literature and the Cultural Turn. New York and Houndmills, Basingstoke: Palgrave Macmillan. ISBN 978-0-312-29438-0.
- — (2004). Prologues to Shakespeare's Theatre: Performance and Liminality in Early Modern Drama. Abingdon, Oxon: Routledge. ISBN 978-0-415-33443-3. (with Robert Weimann)
- — (2007). To Be or Not to Be. London and New York: Continuum. ISBN 978-0-8264-8997-5.
- — (2008). Shakespeare and the Power of Performance: Stage and Page in the Elizabethan Theatre. Cambridge and New York: Cambridge. ISBN 978-0-521-89532-3. (with Robert Weimann)
