= Dr. Susan LaFlesche Picotte Memorial Hospital =

- Dr. Susan Picotte Memorial Hospital
- U.S. National Register of Historic Places
- U.S. National Historic Landmark
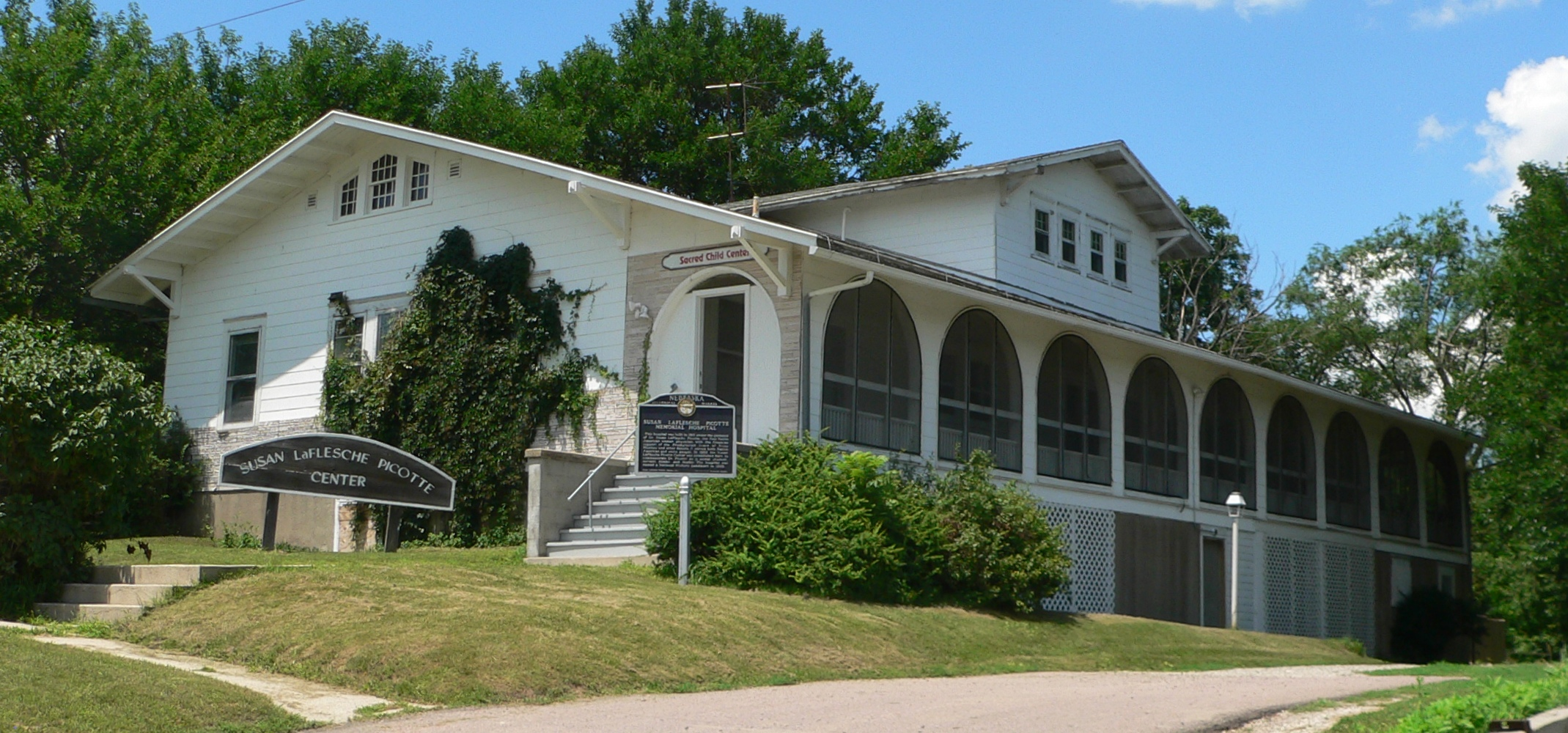
- Front of the hospital

- Location within Nebraska Location within the United States
- Location: 503 Matthewson St., Walthill, Nebraska
- Coordinates: 42°9′6″N 96°29′41″W
- Built: 1912
- Architect: William L. Steele
- Architectural style: Craftsman
- NRHP reference No.: 88002762

Significant dates
- Added to NRHP: December 16, 1988
- Designated NHL: April 19, 1993

Dr. Susan LaFlesche Picotte Memorial Hospital, also known as Walthill Hospital or Dr. Susan Picotte Memorial Hospital, is a former hospital building at 505 Matthewson Street in Walthill, Nebraska, on the Omaha Indian Reservation. The hospital was developed by Dr. Susan LaFlesche Picotte (1865–1915), the first female Native American medical doctor. Built with money raised by Picotte from various sources, it was the first hospital for any Indian reservation not funded by government money. It served the community as a hospital until the 1940s, and has had a variety of other uses since. It was declared a National Historic Landmark in 1993.

== Description and history ==
The Picotte Hospital building is located on the western fringe of Walthill, on the north side of Matthewson Street near its junction with Sawyer Street. The building was designed by architect William L. Steele in 1912 and built in 1912–1913. Set on a concrete foundation on a hill overlooking Walthill, the one-and-one-half-story hospital was built in the American Craftsman style of architecture. Typical of Craftsman style, it features a low-pitched, shingled (originally wood-shingled) roof, wide eaves with large braces beneath, exposed roof rafter tails, and a centered gabled dormer. A prominent screened porch runs the entire length of the front (east side) of the structure, bounded by columns that support the roof.

Susan LaFlesche Picotte was born into the Omaha tribe in 1865. Her father, Joseph LaFlesche, was the tribe's last recognized chief, and saw to it that his children were well educated and could integrate into white society. Trained in medicine at the Women's Medical College of Pennsylvania, she returned to the reservation, where she eventually became its primary medical provider. The hospital was built through her fundraising efforts, which yielded the $8,000 needed from a variety of private philanthropic sources. The building was a working hospital until the late 1940s, after which it served a variety of functions since, including a museum. As of 2013, it housed Mi'Jhu'Wi Ministries, a nonprofit providing services to the people of the Omaha Reservation. In 2017, Judi M. gaiashkibos, executive director of the Nebraska Commission on Indian Affairs, set up a committee of Picotte's descendants and community leaders from the Omaha tribe, to help plan the restoration of hospital. Using funding raised from the United States Department of Agriculture and private donations, the hospital was renovated and redesigned to house a medical clinic, museum, and cultural center.

== See also ==
- List of National Historic Landmarks in Nebraska
- National Register of Historic Places listings in Thurston County, Nebraska
