= Andrea (The Spanish Tragedy) =

Andrea is the Spanish nobleman and lover of Bel-imperia whose ghost returns to look upon the events of The Spanish Tragedy, by Thomas Kyd.

== Overview ==
The ghost of Don Andrea opens the play with a monologue describing the circumstances of his death in battle and his descent into the underworld. Andrea laments that he was killed by the Portuguese Prince Balthazar and taken away too soon from his love Bel-imperia. He makes his way to the court of Pluto, where Proserpine acts as his judge.

== Influence upon Hamlet ==
The ghost of Andrea was an influence upon the ghost of King Hamlet in William Shakespeare's Hamlet, who tells Prince Hamlet that he needs to avenge his father's death. While King Hamlet is a driving force upon the plot of Hamlet, however, Andrea's "ghost and his theme, which was to be the core of the play, are superfluous; and, indeed, need never have been introduced".

== Andrea and Revenge ==
Awake, Revenge, if love, as love hath had,
Have yet the power or prevalence in hell!
Hieronimo with Lorenzo is joined in the league
And interprets our passage to revenge.
Awake, Revenge, or we are woe-begone. (3.14.13-17)

Andrea and the personified Revenge serve as the chorus of the play. Andrea comes back to tell the audience of his struggles, and Revenge is the supernatural being that oversees the play's descent into tragedy. Andrea does not control the revenge plot; Revenge continually reminds Andrea to be patient in his desire for vengeance. As Christopher Crosbie has suggested, the ghost of Andrea is concerned not simply with revenge but with social status and courtly ambition.
