= Norfolk Senior High School =

Public high school in Norfolk, Nebraska

Coordinates: 42.0402°N 97.4143°W

- 801 Riverside Blvd., Norfolk, NE 68701

Information
- Type: Public high school
- School district: Norfolk Public School
- NCES School ID: 317443001311
- Principal: Jason Settles
- Teaching staff: 80.30 (FTE)
- Grades: 9–12
- Enrollment: 1,359 (2023-2024)
- Student to teacher ratio: 16.92
- Colors: Maroon and white
- Athletics conference: Heartland Athletic Conference
- Nickname: Panthers
- Information: 402-644-2529
- Website: School website

Norfolk Senior High School is a public high school in Norfolk, Nebraska. The school had an enrollment of 1,359 in the 2023–2024 academic year.

== Athletics ==
Norfolk Senior High School is a member of the Nebraska School Activities Association and competes in the Heartland Athletic Conference. The school mascot is the Panther.

State championships
Season	Sport	Number of championships	Year
Fall	Football	1	1994
Fall	Cross country, boys	0	
Fall	Cross country, girls	2	2008, 2009
Fall	Volleyball	0	
Fall	Softball	0	
Fall	Golf, girls	3	1996, 1998, 2012
Fall	Tennis, boys	1	1973
Fall	Unified bowling	1	2019
Winter	Basketball, boys	2	1987, 2017
Winter	Basketball, girls	0	
Winter	Swimming & Diving, boys	0	
Winter	Swimming & Diving, girls	0	
Winter	Wrestling, boys	0	
Winter	Wrestling, girls	1	2025
Winter	Bowling, boys	0	
Winter	Bowling, girls	0	
Spring	Baseball	0	
Spring	Soccer, boys	0	
Spring	Soccer, girls	0	
Spring	Track and field, boys	1	1979
Spring	Track and field, girls	0	
Spring	Golf, boys	1	2018
Spring	Tennis, girls	0	
Total		13	

== Notable alumni ==
- Douglas Bruster, 1981
- Johnny Carson, 1943
- Judi M. gaiashkibos (née Upton)
- Jared Schuurmans
- Thurl Ravenscroft, 1932
