= The Spanish Tragedy =

Play by Thomas Kyd

Title page of the 1615 edition

The Spanish Tragedy, or Hieronimo is Mad Again is an Elizabethan tragedy written by Thomas Kyd between 1582 and 1592. Highly popular and influential in its time, The Spanish Tragedy established a new genre in English theatre: the revenge play or revenge tragedy. It is considered one of the most influential plays of the Renaissance theatre. The play contains several violent murders and personifies Revenge as its own character. The Spanish Tragedy is often considered to be the first mature Elizabethan drama, a claim disputed with Christopher Marlowe's Tamburlaine, and was parodied by many Elizabethan and Jacobean playwrights, including Marlowe, William Shakespeare and Ben Jonson.

Many elements of The Spanish Tragedy, such as the play-within-a-play used to trap a murderer and a ghost intent on vengeance, appear in Shakespeare's Hamlet. (Thomas Kyd is frequently proposed as the author of the hypothetical Ur-Hamlet that may have been one of Shakespeare's primary sources for Hamlet.)

== Performance ==
=== Early performances ===
Lord Strange's Men staged a play that the records call Jeronimo on 23 February 1592 at The Rose for Philip Henslowe, and repeated it sixteen times to 22 January 1593. It is unlikely, however, that the performance in February 1592 was the play's first performance, as Henslowe did not mark it as 'ne' (new). It is unclear whether Jeronimo was The Spanish Tragedy, or The First Part of Hieronimo (printed in 1604), the anonymous "prequel" to Kyd's play. (Note: Sidney Lee and Hartley Coleridge, from internal evidence, consider Jeronimo to be a lost earlier work by Kyd (giving rise to the alternative title Jeronimo is mad again), whereas Frederick Boas and Rudolf Fischer consign authorship to a later, anonymous hack writer capitalising on Kyd's success.) The two plays were staged as pairs (over consecutive performances) in March and May 1597.

English actors performed the play on tour in Germany in 1592. (Note: The Admiral's Men temporarily split up in 1592 while playgoing in London was prohibited because of a new plague outbreak. Their patron, Admiral Lord Howard, issued passports to "Mes jouers et servitors" (My players and servants), and actor Robert Browne led a small troupe to Germany.) The Admiral's Men revived Kyd's original on 7 January 1597, and performed it twelve times to 19 July; they staged another performance jointly with Pembroke's Men on 11 October of the same year. The records of Philip Henslowe suggest that the play was on stage again in 1601 and 1602.

The play became a popular hit in Germany and The Netherlands. Playwright Jakob Ayrer produced a translation into German before 1600, which appeared in an anthology of his plays in 1618. Everaert Siceram included scenes in his Dutch translation of Orlando Furioso, published Antwerp, 1615.

=== Modern performances ===
The Spanish Tragedy was performed at London's National Theatre, first in 1982 at the Cottesloe Theatre, with Michael Bryant in the role of Hieronimo, directed by Michael Bogdanov. It transferred to the Lyttelton Theatre in 1984.

The Royal Shakespeare Company performed The Spanish Tragedy in May 1997 at the Swan Theatre, directed by Michael Boyd. The cast included Siobhan Redmond as Bel-imperia, Robert Glenister as Lorenzo, Peter Wight as Hieronimo, Jeffry Wickham as the King of Spain. The production later transferred to The Pit at London's Barbican in November 1997.

An amateur production of The Spanish Tragedy was performed 2–6 June 2009 by students from Oxford University, in the second quad of Oriel College, Oxford. Another amateur production was presented by the Hyperion Shakespeare Company 21–30 October 2010 with students from Harvard University in Harvard's New College Theatre. In November 2012, Perchance Theatre in association with Cambridge University's Marlowe Society staged a site-specific production in King's College Chapel, Cambridge. In October/November 2013, the Baron's Men of Austin, TX performed the work in a near-uncut state, with period costumes and effects, at Richard Garriott's Curtain Theatre, a mini replica of the Globe Theatre. Another amateur production was presented by the Experimental Theater Board of Carleton College 27–29 May 2015.

Other professional performances include a modern-dress production staged at the Arcola Theatre in London in October–November 2009, directed by Mitchell Moreno, with Dominic Rowan as Hieronimo, as well as a production in Belle Époque era costume, staged by Theatre Pro Rata in Minneapolis in March 2010, directed by Carin Bratlie.

The play has been produced a number of times on radio by the BBC:

- 11 October 1953, BBC Third Programme, with Cecil Trouncer as Hieronimo, Denise Bryer as Bel-Imperia and Peter Coke as Lorenzo.
- 2 March 1969, BBC Radio 3, with John Laurie as Hieronimo, Rosalind Shanks as Bel-Imperia and Anthony Jacobs as Lorenzo.
- 6 November 1994, BBC Radio 3, with Oliver Cotton as Hieronimo, Kristin Milward as Bel-Imperia and Jonathan Cullen as Lorenzo. This production marked the 400th anniversary of Kyd's death.
- 12 November 2023, BBC Radio 3, with Robert Glenister as Hieronimo, Joanna Vanderham as Bel-Imperia and Sandy Grierson as Lorenzo.

== Publication ==
In the "Induction" to his play Bartholomew Fair (1614), Ben Jonson alludes to The Spanish Tragedy as being "five and twenty or thirty years" old. If taken literally, this would yield a date range of 1584–1589, a range that agrees with what else is known about the play. The exact date of composition is unknown, though it is speculated that it was written sometime between 1583 and 1591. In a review of academic debate on the topic, Lukas Erne summarises the conclusions as pointing to a completion date before 1588, noting that the play makes no reference to the Spanish Armada, and because of possible allusions to the play in Nashe's Preface to Greene's Menaphon from 1589 and The Anatomie of Absurdity from 1588 to 1589. Kyd's biographer J. R. Mulryne, while acknowledging that evidence is scant, concludes that the year 1587 remains the most likely year for completion of the play.

Kyd's play was entered into the Stationers' Register on 6 October 1592 by the bookseller Abel Jeffes. The play was published in an undated quarto, almost certainly before the end of 1592; this first quarto was printed by Edward Allde—and published not by the copyright holder Jeffes, but by another bookseller, Edward White. On 18 December that year, the Stationers Company ruled that both Jeffes and White had broken the guild's rules by printing works that belonged to the other; both men were fined 10 shillings, and the offending books were destroyed so that the first quarto of The Spanish Tragedy survives in only a single copy. Yet the Q1 title page refers to an even earlier edition; this was probably by Jeffes, and no known copy exists.

The popular play was reprinted in 1594. In an apparent compromise between the competing booksellers, the title page of this, the second, quarto credits the edition to "Abell Jeffes, to be sold by Edward White". On 13 August 1599, Jeffes transferred his copyright to William White, who issued the third edition that year. White in turn transferred the copyright to Thomas Pavier on 14 August 1600 and Pavier issued the fourth edition (printed for him by William White) in 1602. This 1602 quarto ("Q4") contains five additions to the preexisting text. Q4 was reprinted in 1610, 1615 (two issues), 1618, 1623 (two issues), and 1633.

== Authorship ==
All of the early editions are anonymous. The first indication that the author of the play was Kyd was in 1773 when Thomas Hawkins, the editor of a three-volume play-collection, cited a brief quotation from The Spanish Tragedy in Thomas Heywood's Apology for Actors (1612), which Heywood attributes to "M. Kid". The style of The Spanish Tragedy is considered such a good match with Kyd's style in his other extant play, Cornelia (1593), that scholars and critics have universally recognised Kyd's authorship.

In 2013, scholar Douglas Bruster theorised that some awkward wordings in the "additional passages" of the 1602 fourth edition resulted from printers' errors in setting type from the (now lost) original manuscript. Furthermore, after examining the "Hand D" manuscript (widely accepted as in Shakespeare's handwriting) from the play Sir Thomas More, Bruster argued that the speculated printers' errors resulted from reading a manuscript written by someone with Shakespeare's "messy" handwriting, thus bolstering the likelihood that Shakespeare wrote the additional passages.

== Characters ==
Figures in the Frame

- The ghost of Don Andrea
- An embodiment of Revenge

Spain

- The Spanish King
- Don Cyprian, Duke of Castile, the King's brother
- Don Lorenzo, the Duke of Castile's son
- Bel-imperia, the Duke of Castile's daughter
- Pedringano, Bel-imperia's servant
- Christophil, Don Lorenzo's servant
- Don Lorenzo's page boy
- Don Hieronimo, Knight Marshal of Spain
- Isabella, his wife
- Don Horatio, their son
- A servant to Don Hieronimo
- A maid to Isabella
- Don Bazulto, an elderly man
- General of the Spanish army
- Three watchmen
- A deputy
- A hangman
- A messenger
- Three citizens

Portugal

- The Portuguese Viceroy
- Prince Balthazar, his son
- Don Pedro, the Viceroy's brother
- Alexandro and Villuppo, Portuguese noblemen
- The Portuguese Ambassador
- Serberine, Balthazar's serving-man
- Two noblemen of Portugal
- Two Portuguese citizens (Portingales)

In Hieronimo's play

- Soliman, Sultan of Turkey (played by Balthazar)
- Erasto ("Erastus"), Knight of Rhodes (played by Lorenzo)
- Bashaw (played by Hieronimo)
- Perseda (played by Bel-imperia)

== Setting ==
The Spanish Tragedy primarily takes place in Spain.

Due to many unknowns surrounding the authorship of The Spanish Tragedy, it is currently unknown whether the play was written before or after the armada in 1588. Scholars believe the play was written before 1588, due to the lack of any mention of the armada.

The play is set against the backdrop of the unification of Spain and Portugal, which was carried out as Philip II of Spain ascended to the throne in Portugal. The battle in which Balthazar is captured before the play starts is one which occurred in the fallout of the annexation.

Despite intense anti-Spain sentiment in England, Kyd's play does not portray Spain as a society particularly bereft of morals or laws. This is exemplified by the Spanish king's treatment of Balthazar as his prisoner: "yet free from bearing any servile yoke, for in our hearing thy deserts were great, and in our sight thyself art gracious" (I.ii.148-150).

While the setting of the play is a result of a notable political conflict, it does not contribute to the violence and revenge that actually takes place directly within the play.

== Plot ==
Before the play begins, the Viceroy of Portugal rebelled against Spanish rule. A battle took place in which the Portuguese were defeated and their leader, the Viceroy's son Balthazar, killed the Spanish officer Andrea before being taken captive by the Spanish. Andrea's ghost and the personification Revenge itself are present onstage throughout the entirety of the play and serve as chorus. At the end of each act, Andrea bemoans the series of injustices that have taken place and then Revenge reassures him that those deserving will get their comeuppance. The Ghost of Andrea and Revenge open the play in Act 1 and close the play in Act 5 with descriptions of the Classical underworld. There is also a subplot concerning the enmity of two Portuguese noblemen, one of whom attempts to convince the Viceroy that his rival has murdered the missing Balthazar.

The King's nephew Lorenzo and Andrea's best friend Horatio dispute over who captured Balthazar. Though it is made clear early on that Horatio defeated Balthazar and Lorenzo has essentially cheated his way into taking partial credit, the King leaves Balthazar in Lorenzo's charge and splits the spoils of the victory between the two. Horatio comforts Lorenzo's sister, Bel-imperia, who was in love with Andrea against her family's wishes. Despite her former feelings for Andrea, Bel-imperia soon falls for Horatio. She confesses that her love for Horatio is motivated partially by her desire for revenge: Bel-imperia intends to torment Balthazar, who killed her former lover Andrea.

Meanwhile, Balthazar is falling in love with Bel-imperia. The Spanish king decides that a marriage between Balthazar and Bel-imperia would be an excellent way to repair the peace with Portugal. Horatio's father, the Marshal Hieronimo, stages an entertainment for the Portuguese ambassador. Lorenzo, suspecting that Bel-imperia has found a new lover, bribes her servant Pedringano and discovers that Horatio is the man. He persuades Balthazar to help him murder Horatio during an assignation with Bel-imperia. Hieronimo and his wife Isabella find the body of their son hanged and stabbed, and Isabella is driven mad. (Revisions made to the original play supplement the scene with Hieronimo briefly losing his wits as well.)

Lorenzo locks Bel-imperia away, but she succeeds in sending Hieronimo a letter, written in her own blood, informing him that Lorenzo and Balthazar were Horatio's murderers. Hieronimo's questions and attempts to see Bel-imperia convince Lorenzo that he knows something. Afraid that Balthazar's servant Serberine has revealed the truth, Lorenzo convinces Pedringano to murder Serberine, then arranges for Pedringano's arrest in the hopes of silencing him too. Hieronimo, appointed judge, sentences Pedringano to death. Pedringano expects Lorenzo to procure his pardon, and Lorenzo, having written a fake letter of pardon, lets him believe this right up until the hangman drops Pedringano to his death.

Lorenzo manages to prevent Hieronimo from seeking justice by convincing the King that Horatio is alive and well. Furthermore, Lorenzo does not allow Hieronimo to see the King, claiming that he is too busy. This, combined with his wife Isabella's suicide, pushes Hieronimo past his limit. He rants incoherently and digs at the ground with his dagger. Lorenzo goes on to tell his uncle, the King, that Hieronimo's odd behaviour is due to his inability to deal with his son Horatio's newfound wealth (Balthazar's ransom from the Portuguese Viceroy), and he has gone mad with jealousy. Regaining his senses, Hieronimo, along with Bel-imperia, feigns reconciliation with the murderers, and asks them to join him in putting on a play, Soliman and Perseda, to entertain the court.

When the play is performed, Hieronimo uses real daggers instead of prop daggers, so that Lorenzo and Balthazar are stabbed to death in front of the King, Viceroy, and Duke (Lorenzo and Bel-imperia's father). He cast the play in such a way that both himself and Bel-imperia could exact their own revenge by actually killing the murderers. Bel-imperia chooses to stab herself during the play too, although this was not Hieronimo's intention for her. Hieronimo tells everyone of the motive behind the murders, bites out his own tongue to prevent himself from talking under torture, and kills the Duke of Castille and then himself. Andrea and Revenge are satisfied, and promise to deliver suitable eternal punishments to the guilty parties.

== Influences ==
Many writers influenced The Spanish Tragedy, notably Seneca and those from the medieval tradition. The play is ostensibly Senecan with its bloody tragedy, rhetoric of the horrible, the character of the Ghost and typical revenge themes. The characters of the Ghost of Andrea and Revenge form a chorus similar to that of Tantalus and Fury in Seneca's Thyestes. The Ghost describes his journey into the underworld and calls for punishment at the end of the play that has influences from Thyestes, Agamemnon and Phaedra. The use of onomastic rhetoric is also Senecan, with characters playing upon their names, as Hieronimo does repeatedly. Hieronimo also references the Senecan plays, Agamemnon and Troades, in his monologue in Act 3, scene 13. The character of the Old Man, Senex, is seen as a direct reference to Seneca.

The play also subverts typically Senecan qualities such as the use of a ghost character. For Kyd, the Ghost is part of the chorus, unlike in Thyestes where the Ghost leaves after the prologue. Also, the Ghost is not a functioning prologue as he does not give the audience information about the major action on stage nor its conclusion. The Ghost is similar to those in metrical medieval plays who return from the dead to talk about their downfall and offer commentary on the action. Revenge is akin to a medieval character that acts as a guide for those on a journey.

Additionally, Don Andrea himself subverts the Senecan tradition. Andrea lacks the history of family violence which Tantalus has in Thyestes. Their introductions are also different, with Andrea being notably excited and curious to watch revenge play out.

== Allusions ==
The Spanish Tragedy was enormously influential, and references and allusions to it abound in the literature of its era. Ben Jonson mentions "Hieronimo" in the Induction to his Cynthia's Revels (1600), has a character disguise himself in "Hieronimo's old cloak, ruff, and hat" in The Alchemist (1610), and quotes from the play in Every Man in His Humour (1598), Act I, scene iv. In Satiromastix (1601), Thomas Dekker suggests that Jonson, in his early days as an actor, himself played Hieronimo.

A companion play to The Spanish Tragedy was anonymously published in 1605 entitled The Spanish Comedy or The First Part of Hieronimo. The play spans from Don Andrea's departure for Portugal to demand the payment of tribute and an end to the uprising, and his untimely murder. Only parts of the text have been preserved. The play takes place before The Spanish Tragedy chronologically, although it was published more than a decade later. Due to the author's anonymity, there is debate between scholars about whether this was a companion piece also written by Kyd or another writer's attempt to contribute to the story themselves.

Allusions continue for decades after the play's origin, including references in Thomas Tomkis's Albumazar (1615), Thomas May's The Heir (1620), and as late as Thomas Rawlins's The Rebellion (c. 1638).

In modern times, T. S. Eliot quoted the title and the play in his poem The Waste Land. The play is performed in Orhan Pamuk's 2002 novel Snow, where the murder of the performance director, Sunay, is likened to the death of Horatio in the play.

== 1602 additions ==
The White/Pavier fourth quarto of 1602 added five passages, totalling 320 lines, to the existing text. The most substantial passage is an entire scene, usually called the painter scene, since it is dominated by Hieronimo's conversation with a painter; it is often designated III, xiia, falling as it does between scenes III, xii and III, xiii of the original text. Scholars have proposed various identities for the author of the revisions, including Dekker, John Webster, and Shakespeare—"Shakespeare has perhaps been the favourite in the continuing search..."

John Marston appears to parody the painter scene in his 1599 play Antonio and Mellida, indicating that the scene must have been in existence and known to audiences by that time. Henslowe's diary records two payments to Ben Jonson, dated 25 September 1601 and 22 June 1602, for additions to Jeronymo (although the expansion may have been made earlier, when Henslowe and the Admiral's Men revived the production in 1597). Henslowe's first payment to Jonson was £2 and the second £10 (which would include a standard £6 for Richard Crookback, a play now lost). This is much more than would be usual for a 320-line addition and critic Warren Stevenson concludes that the payments must refer to other work. Andrew Gurr rejects the view that Jonson is the author of the 1602 additions, summing up modern opinion that the chronology of the payments, the inferior verse (not following the original metric style) and the introduction of plot inconsistencies make the attribution "debatable". Anne Barton, however, suggests that Henslowe approached Jonson to expand the part of Heironimo (once played by Jonson himself) to give more effect to the character's grief and madness.

== Themes and motifs ==
=== Revenge ===
Revenge bookends the entire play. The embodied Revenge promises Don Andrea that his killer, Balthazar, will be killed, which is not resolved until the end of the play. The play almost seems to acknowledge the slow burn of Andrea's revenge, as the embodied Revenge falls asleep before the end of the play.

The morality of revenge has been a source of discourse for years, and as revenge is one of the key themes of the play, a lot of debate has been made over it in the context of the Spanish Tragedy specifically. Hieronimo's pursuit for revenge and subsequent scheme is open to moral-based judgement, but the question many scholars face is whether the responsibility and fault of Hieronimo's desire for revenge belongs solely to him. In one theory, Steven Justice proposes that the fault lies not in Hieronimo, but rather in the society at the time. It is argued that Kyd used the revenge tragedy to give body to popular images of Catholic Spain. Kyd tries to make Spain the villain, in that he shows how the Spanish court gives Hieronimo no acceptable choice; the king's failure to provide official retribution for the murder of Horatio turns Hieronimo towards the private pursuit of justice. This is, however, is an equally blameworthy "counter-crime" (even though Hieronimo believes that he is serving justice and not revenge).

Some critics claim that Hieronimo's attitude is what central Christian tradition calls the Old Law, the Biblical notion of an "eye for an eye". Hieronimo's passion for justice in society is revealed when he says, "For blood with blood shall, while I sit as judge, / Be satisfied, and the law discharg'd" (III.vi.35–36).

=== Murder and death ===
The nature of murder and death, performed and as natural phenomena, is also questioned. Smith considers how the decade in which the play is set, is relevant to its mentionings of hangings, murders, and near deaths throughout. Multiple characters are killed or nearly killed throughout the play. Horatio is hanged, Pedringano is hanged, Alexandro is nearly burnt at the stake, and Villuppo is assumed tortured and hanged. Kyd consistently refers to mutilation, torture, and death, beginning early in the play when the ghost of Don Andrea describes his stay in the underworld: "And murderers groan with never killing wounds, / And perjured wights scalded in boiling lead, / And all foul sins with torments overwhelmed" (I.i.68–70). He vividly describes in these lines as well as others the frequency of murder and torture in the underworld. Murder and death make up the tragedy theme that holds true through the last scene of the play.

=== Social mobility ===
Another theme is social mobility, as characters such as Lorenzo and Pedringano are driven by their ambition and desire for more power. Pedringano especially so as he is a servant, belonging in the lowest rank of the hierarchy. His efforts to curry favor (and go beyond his 'place') with Lorenzo leads to his resulting downfall as he is barred from social mobility, a mere tool in the end.

Christopher Crosbie cites academic commentators who consider class antagonism as a context Kyd is exploring in the play. Hieronimo, the ambitious Knight Marshal (an appointed court official) is set against the aristocratic nobility of the courtiers: Hieronimo and his family are labeled as a "middling sort". Kyd establishes a situation in which conflict between Hieronimo's household and the nobility is inevitable: the middle class is seen as a threat, one that is pressing up on the aristocrats. This is evident in scenes such as the resulting competition from the 'middling sort' Horatio, and Lorenzo, the King's nephew.

=== Torture and justice ===
Torture also comes up within the play, most notably at the end of Act IV, when the King of Spain threatens to torture Hieronimo after he reveals that the murders in the play were real. Hieronimo's response, biting off his own tongue, has been interpreted in a multitude of ways. Scholar Timothy Turner notes that this biting off of the tongue has been interpreted as "a rejection of the fatuities of language, a radical gesture demonstrating Hieronimo's sense of 'inwardness,' or an indictment of the Spanish Court." However, while this torture is threatened by the Spanish King, it also mirrors time period in which it is believe Kyd authored the play within England, as torture was increasingly used by the privy council. The growing presence of Jesuit missionaries within England, as a result of the Regnans in Excelsis (which excommunicated Elizabeth I), inspired a belief that Spain and France were preparing an invasion. As such, these missionaries were the most frequent victims of England's growing use of torture.

Within the context of The Spanish Tragedy, Hieronimo himself has the title of Knight Marshal, a position which contemporary viewers would have associated with torture and martial law. Hieronimo also describes a need for summary justice (justice enacted without typical due process of the law) in his revenge plot, despite his own position as a judge.

Torture is threatened within the play multiple times. When attempting to discern the identity of Bel-Imperia's lover, Lorenzo threatens her servant Pedringano: "and fear shall force what friendship cannot win," and once Lorenzo learns it is Horatio, he remarks "where words prevail not, violence prevails" (II.i.68 and 107–108). Turner proposes by connecting torture to the acquisition of information, Kyd draws further comparisons to contemporary England.

Similarly, within the Portuguese subplot of the play (with the Viceroy, Alexandro and Villuppo), martial law and summary justice appear. Villuppo, in an attempt to climb ranks, accuses Alexandro of murdering the Viceroy's son, Balthazar in battle. Without trials or witnesses, the Viceroy orders Alexendro imprisoned, and to be executed if Balthazar is found dead. Once Villuppo duplicity is revealed, the Viceroy orders the painful execution of Villuppo, yet again circumventing due process of the law.

=== Sex and marriage ===
Sex and marriage play a central role in The Spanish Tragedy. The King of Spain arranges Balthazar and Bel-Imperia to be married in order to strengthen the unification of Spain and Portugal. Balthazar falls deeply in love with Bel-Imperia, and once he and Lorenzo discover that she is in love with Horatio, the two murder him.

Bel-Imperia and Horatio, moments before the latter's murder, make-love, and exchange coy lines rife with war imagery, though scholar David Willbern notes it is unknown whether the act is actually consummated, as Lorenzo and Balthazar rush in and murder Horatio. He notes that violence is used to provide the relief of the sexual tension built up in the scene, replacing sexual, physical contact.

Willbern describes that there is a sort of Oedipal reversal within the play. Both Hieronimo and the Viceroy deal with the deaths of their respective sons, Horatio and Balthazar. Earlier in the play, when Villuppo lies about the death of Balthazar, the Viceroy has no reason to believe him over Alexendro, yet chooses to believe the former.

=== Spectacle ===
The Spanish Tragedy was penned and first performed at the relative height of the Elizabethan era, during which it was a common cultural practice to attend public hangings or executions at sites such as Tyburn gallows: the provision for spectators at public executions and for theatre audiences were similar, showing that each was considered to be a form of communal entertainment. Tyburn was surrounded by a variety of viewing options including seats, boxes, rooms, houses, and standing room sections. This made them accessible to the upper and lower classes alike. Thus, executions became a performance, not unlike the legitimate theatre. This contextualises Kyd's graphic description of death and propensity to end his characters through execution. In this writing, scholars believe that Kyd was appealing to the likes and familiarities of his attending audience. Within the play, Horatio, Pedringano, and Villuppo are all hanged. Their hangings and the additional murders and violence are described graphically throughout.

At the centerpiece of this spectacle is Horatio's hanging. Hieronimo continuously returns to it, not only as he attempts to gain his revenge, but to appease the voyeuristic needs of the audience as a result of Kyd's recognition of their enjoyment of mutilation and public violence. In the violence of his hanging and that which follows throughout the rest of the play, the audience gains voyeuristic pleasure watching the characters witness it and watching it with them. This phenomenon can be specifically observed in the stabbing which Bel-Imperia and Balthazar witness. In this stabbing, Bel-Imperia's immediate response confirms her shared viewership of the event, and highlights Kyd's use of the public viewership to create spectacle. In Kyd's graphic descriptions, the notion of spectacle is present everywhere, as even in the plays themselves the characters note their enjoyment in watching this violence.

Similarly, in Hieronimo's play, voyeuristic pleasure is derived from the audience as they watch the characters watch the play. Thus, the second spectacle comes from the theatre itself and the position of Heronimo's play within the play of The Spanish Tragedy. One of the most common forms of entertainment during this era included watching a play. Therefore, both the audience and the characters mire in its spectacle and entertainment value. Scholars believe that Kyd's uses this inner play to manipulate the boundaries of what can appear within tragedy at the time. This allows him to criticize both the legitimate and imaginary structures of the society that he had interpreted and created. As the audience of Hieronimo's play is the royal houses of Spain and Portugal, Kyd invites his own audience to question the purpose of the realistic violence and what the role of pleasure is in observing its spectacle. Thus, pleasure is derived from watching the audience of the play and the violence of play itself.

== Structure ==
The structure in essence is a "play within a play". The play begins with a background of why Hieronimo wants to seek revenge. He is seen as a minor character and eventually becomes the protagonist to add to the revenge plot. When he becomes the main character, the plot begins to unfold and become the revenge story that it is. Kyd incorporates the buildup to the revenge as a way to show the internal and external struggles of the characters. The actual revenge takes place during the play that Hieronimo stages, making this the climax of the play. The resolution is the explanation to the king of what has happened. The play within the play is not described until the actual play is performed, intensifying the climax, and the resolution is short due to the explanations that have already occurred.

Critics say that The Spanish Tragedy resembles a Senecan Tragedy. The separation of acts, the emphasized bloody climax, and the revenge itself, make this play resemble some of the most famous ancient plays. Kyd does acknowledge his relations to Senecan Tragedies by using Latin directly in the play but also causes Christianity to conflict with pagan ideals. We also see Kyd's use of Seneca through his referencing three Senecan plays in The Spanish Tragedy. It is said that this play was the initiator of the style for many "Elizabethan revenge tragedies, most notably Hamlet".

The earliest versions of the play are divided into four acts rather than using the classical five-act structure for plays of this era, with a disproportionately long Act III of fifteen scenes. It may be that the lack of a chorus between two acts, or perhaps such a chorus being lost, resulted in two acts being treated as one.

== Select editions ==
- Kyd, Thomas, The Spanish Tragedy Broadview Edition (Peterborough, Ontario: Broadview Press, 2016). ISBN 978-1-55481-205-9. Edited by Patrick McHenry. Includes introduction and supplementary historical documents.
- Kyd, Thomas, The Spanish Tragedy (London: Bloomsbury, 2013) ISBN 978-1904271604. Edited with an introduction and notes by Clara Calvo and Jesús Tronch.
- Maus, Katharine Eisaman, editor, Four Revenge Tragedies (Oxford: Oxford University Press, 1998) ISBN 0-19-283878-4. Contains The Spanish Tragedy, The Revenger's Tragedy, The Revenge of Bussy D'Ambois, and The Atheist's Tragedy.
