= The Murder of John Brewen =

1592 pamphlet by Thomas Kyd

The Murder of John Brewen (1592) is a pamphlet concerning the murder of a goldsmith by his wife. It is presumed to have been written by the Elizabethan playwright, Thomas Kyd (1558–1594).

== Genre ==
Before the existence of large daily newspapers since the late 18th century, news of the day, including sensationalist pieces, of which this is one example, were communicated by such pamphlets or else by ballads. Though written by a playwright, it does not seem to have been produced as a play in Elizabethan times.

Nevertheless, it shows some affinity with domestic tragedies of the period, all on the subject of woman's adulterous proclivities, such as A Yorkshire Tragedy, Arden of Faversham, and A Woman Killed with Kindness. William Shakespeare's Othello, to a lesser extent The Winter's Tale and The Merry Wives of Windsor, are additional examples of this category, except that in each case the woman's adultery is falsely imagined by the husband. Domestic tragedies include the murder of other family members, such as the lost Jacobean play Keep the Widow Waking, in which a son kills his mother.

== The Elizabethan Journals ==
The description of the murder is given in "The Elizabethan Journals". with the following entry of a current event in 1592:

This day Anne Brewen and John Parker were executed in Smithfield for the murder of John Brewen. Two and a half years before Anne Welles (as she then was) by divers young men was beloved, but especially by John Brewen and John Parker, both goldsmiths, being bachelors and good friends Brewen had the favour of her friends and kinsfolk, but notwithstanding his long suit and the gifts of gold and jewels that he gave her he was disdained in favour of Parker, who enjoyed her love in secret. At length seeing his suit despised and having no hope of her favour, Brewen determined to demand again his gold and jewels, and coming to her he requested that his gifts might be given back, to this she answered contemptuously that he should stay for it. Without more ado the young man had her arrested for the jewels. The damsel was so astonished and dismayed that she promised if he would let his action fall nor ever think the worse of her, she would marry him and make him her husband by a certain day, and this before witnesses she vowed to perform. Brewen therefore was not a little joyful and made preparation for his marriage, but when Parker heard of it he was grievously vexed and taunted her so bitterly that she repented of the promise made to Brewen, and began to hate him, and after this Parker would never let her rest but continually urged her to make away with him.

== Modern adaptation ==
"John Brewen" adapted at Wikiversity
