= Thomas Hawkins (literary editor) =

English Anglican priest and literary editor

- Born: 1729
- Died: 23 October 1772 (aged 42–43)
- Education: Magdalen College, Oxford (MA)

Thomas Hawkins (1729 - 23 October 1772) was an English Anglican priest, academic and literary editor. He edited the second edition of the Hanmer Shakespeare—Sir Thomas Hanmer's Shakespeare edition—which appeared in 1771. His historical work The Origin of the English Drama appeared shortly after his death, in 1773.

== Life ==
Son of John Hawkins of Oxford, he matriculated at Magdalen College, Oxford in 1746, aged 17. He graduated B.A. in 1750, was ordained priest by Thomas Secker in 1752, and graduated M.A. in 1753. He became chaplain of Magdalen College, Oxford in 1754. In his later years, he became involved in the scholarly projects of Sir John Hawkins. According to Davis, while Thomas Hawkins and Sir John were friends, a family relationship has not been traced.

== Works ==
The new edition of the Hanmer Shakespeare was launched in 1769 by a letter from Thomas Percy to Thomas Warton. Thomas Hawkins was brought by the Oxford University Press, and was paid £250 for his editorial work. It was supported by Sir John Hawkins, Percy and Warton in expanding Hanmer's original and much-criticised efforts. The glossary was doubled in size, and the commentary clarified. But it still fell short of the contemporary work in annotating Shakespeare, with Samuel Johnson, Edmond Malone and George Steevens.

As part of his research, Thomas Hawkins published in his Origin the attribution of The Spanish Tragedy, an Elizabethan play, to Thomas Kyd. His theory is now part of standard scholarship. It was a deduction from a mention of "M. Kid" as the author of the play, in Apologie for Actors, a 1612 work of Thomas Heywood. The Origin of the English Drama itself was a collection of the earlier English dramas, in three volumes, published with a dedication to Sir John Hawkins.
