= Judi M. gaiashkibos =

Ponca-Santee administrator (born 1953)

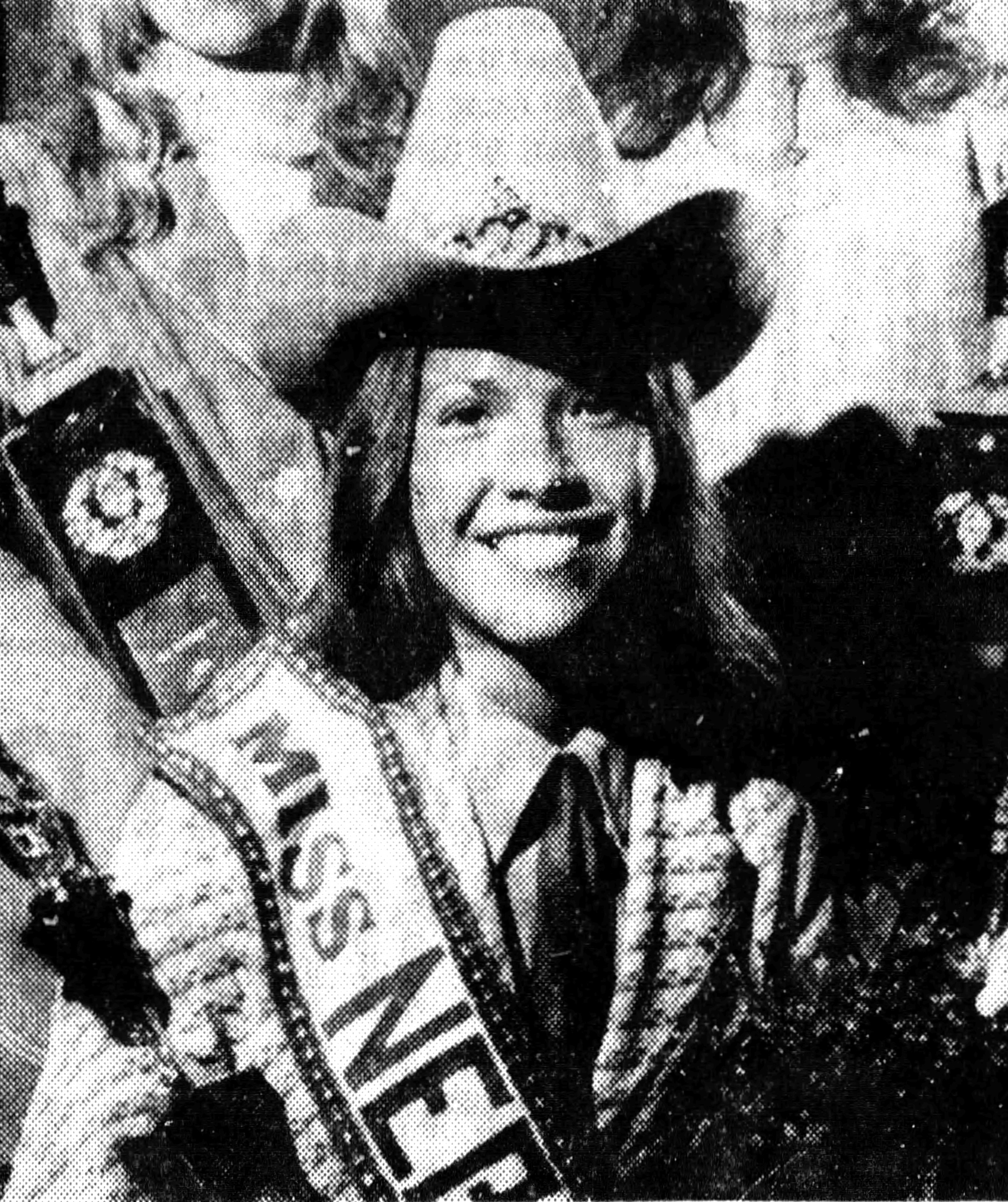
- Upton winner of Miss Nebraskaland, 1973
- Born: Judi Marie Upton; 1953 (age 72–73); Norfolk, Nebraska, U.S.
- Other names: Judi M. Morgan, Judi Morgan gaiashkibos
- Education: Northeast Community College; Doane University
- Occupation: Government policy administrator

Judi M. gaiashkibos (born 1953) is a Ponca-Santee administrator, who has been the executive director of the Nebraska Commission on Indian Affairs since 1995. According to journalist John Mabry, her surname "is pronounced 'gosh-key-bosh' and spelled without a capital in recognition "that the two-legged are not superior to the four". She is an enrolled member of the Ponca Tribe of Nebraska.

Gaiashkibos grew up in Norfolk, Nebraska and won awards as a member of the varsity debating team for Norfolk Senior High School. She was selected as queen of Miss Nebraskaland Days in 1973 and was a finalist in the national College Girl of the Year competition in 1974. She attended Northeastern Nebraska College and later finished her education earning bachelor's and master's degrees from Doane College. After marrying and raising two daughters into their teens, she began working at the Ponca Tribal Headquarters in Lincoln, focusing on locating and repatriating remains of Ponca ancestors. In 1995, she was appointed as executive director of the Nebraska Commission on Indian Affairs, a state agency responsible for liaising between the four Native tribes in the state. She also works with the governor to give Native perspectives on issues and with the legislature to convey information on tribal law. She was the first Ponca tribal member to hold the position.

Among other issues, gaiashkibos's work on the commission has included resolving conflicts around Native American gaming, Native children's welfare, and the Indian Health Service. She served on the Whiteclay Public Health Emergency Task Force to address alcohol sales and the violence associated with its consumption. They successfully closed down liquor stores in Whiteclay, Nebraska and established networks between local, state, and tribal law enforcement agencies to increase reporting of violence and investigations into Missing and Murdered Indigenous Women. She has been involved in the creation of scholarships for Native students and development of a curriculum in women's studies to foster awareness of Native women's contributions to American history. She spearheaded a project to erect a sculpture of Standing Bear (Ponca) on the University of Nebraska–Lincoln campus, as well as at the National Statuary Hall in Washington, D. C. With excess funds raised for Standing Bear's sculpture, gaiashkibos had a statue installed of Susan La Flesche Picotte (Omaha) at the university. She led the drive to restore the National Historic Landmark, Susan La Flesche Picotte Memorial Hospital. Along with the Nebraska State Archeological Office she has led efforts to locate the burial sites of children who attended the Genoa Indian Industrial School. Her work has been recognized with numerous awards from many service organizations in Nebraska.

== Early life and education ==
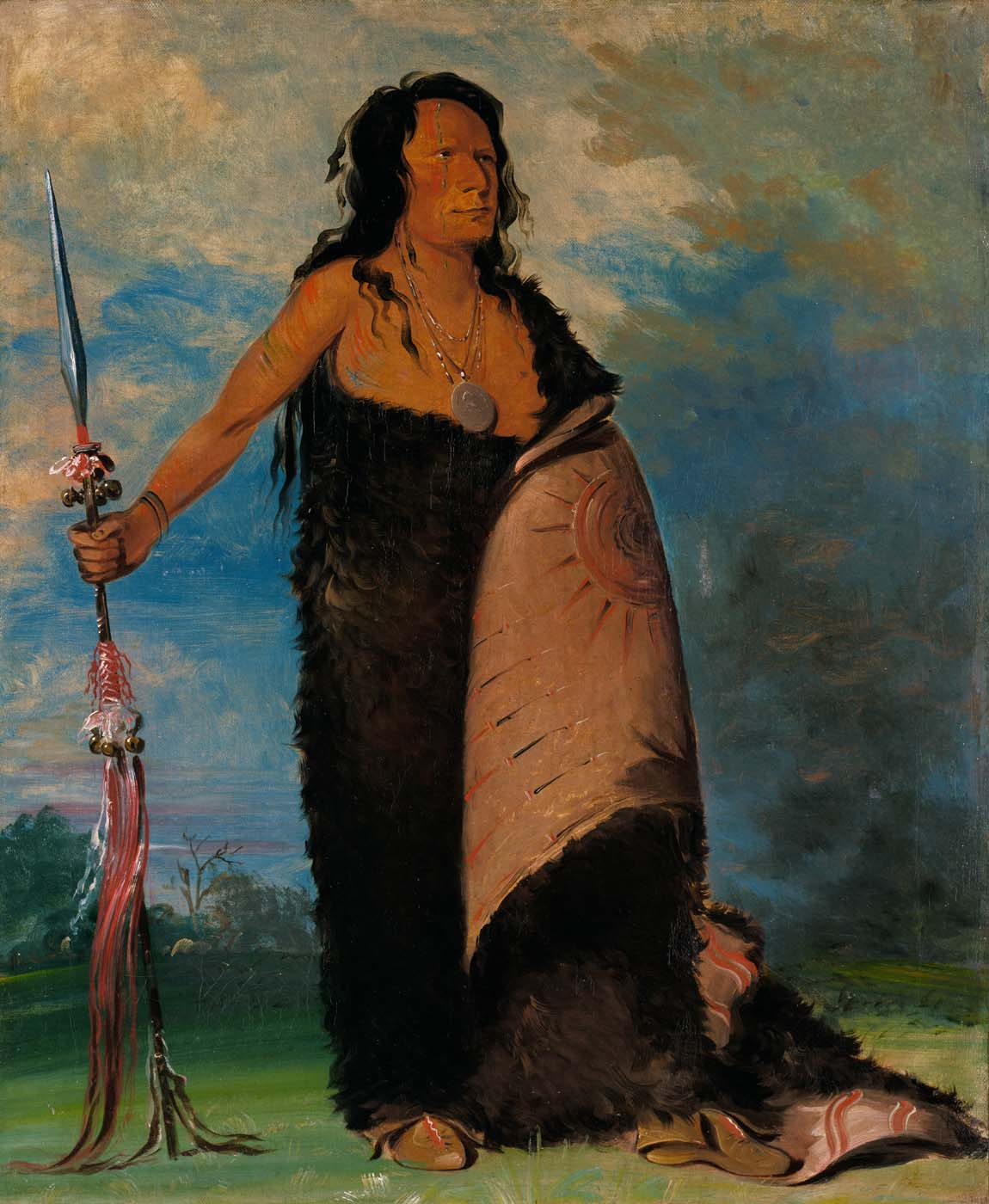
Smokemaker (Shu-de-ga-xe), by Catlin (1832)

Judi Marie Upton was born in 1953, in Norfolk, Nebraska to Eleanor Josephine (née Knudsen) and Harley Randall Upton. Her mother was enrolled in the Ponca Tribe of Nebraska, as were her ten children. Eleanor's mother was Santee Sioux, was fluent in both the Santee and Ponca languages, and in later life lived with the Upton family off the reservation. Eleanor's father, Otto Knudsen, was the last "chief of the second rank" of the Ponca tribe before it was terminated in 1962. He was a descendant of Chief Smokemaker (Shu-de-ga-xe), who was painted by George Catlin. Eleanor grew up on the Ponca Reservation. Along with two of her sisters, she attended the Genoa Indian Industrial School, one of the government-sponsored boarding schools, which attempted to assimilate Indigenous children and prevent them from using their native languages and practicing their cultural traditions. Harley was not Indigenous. After serving in the US Navy during World War II, he worked as a horticulturist and in construction.

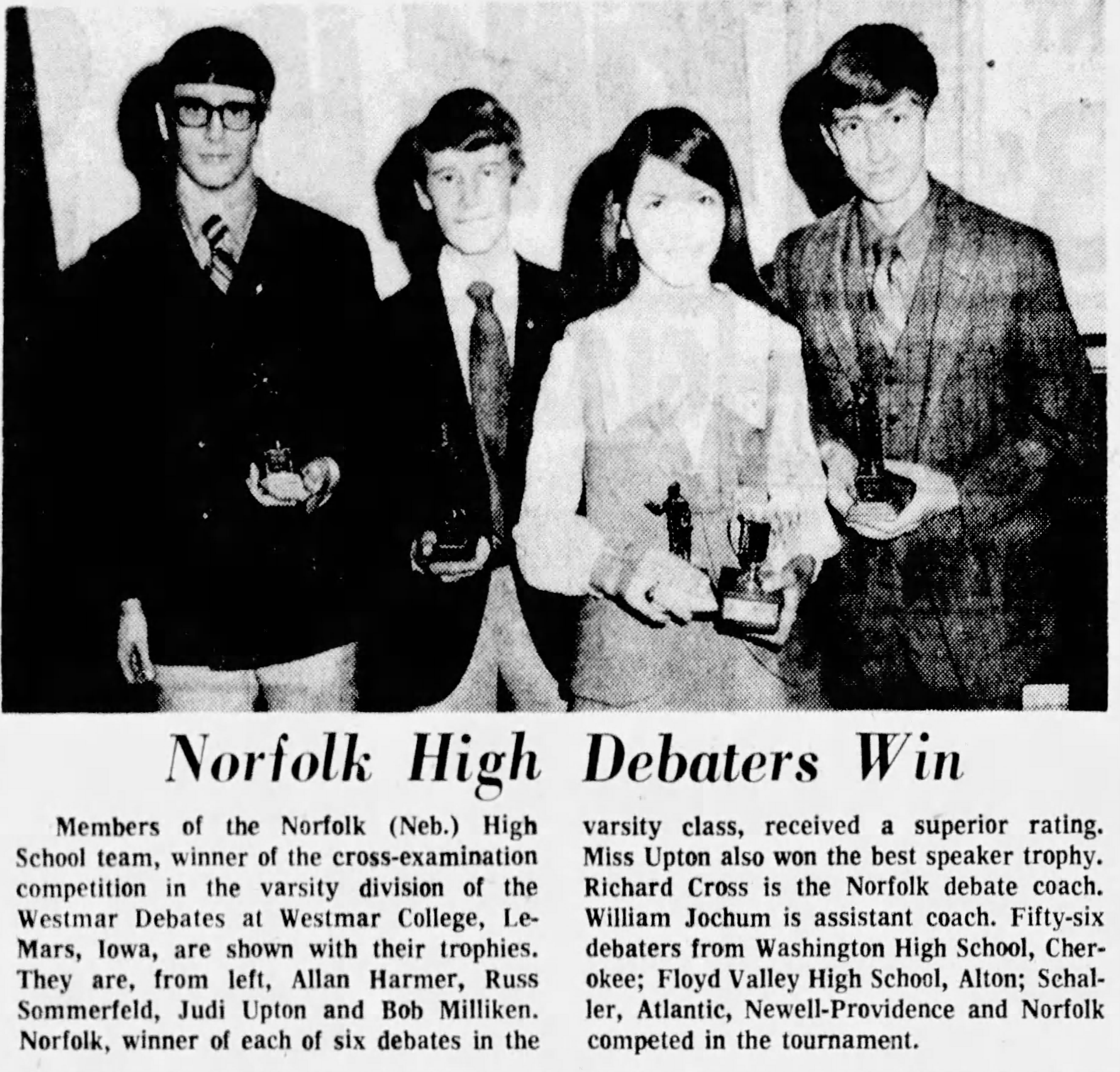
Norfolk High Debaters Win, 1970

Upton and her siblings were raised in Norfolk, near a salvage yard. The family was poor and Eleanor strove to protect the children from the widespread discrimination against Native Americans at the time. It was common for signs to be posted on business establishments that warned "'No Dogs or Indians Allowed'" and for the children to be ridiculed at school. She attended Norfolk Senior High School and was a member of the varsity debating team. In 1970, she won the best speaker title at the regional competition hosted by Westmar College in Le Mars, Iowa. After graduating, she enrolled as a speech major at Northeastern Nebraska College. In 1973, Upton was selected as the winner of the Miss Nebraskaland Days queen competition, earning a US$500 (equivalent to $3,626 in 2025) scholarship. She was one of seven finalists out of fifty-one competitors for the College Girl of the Year award in 1974. The competition was part of the National Cherry Blossom Festival and judged finalists on character, creativeness, community involvement and scholastic achievement, but Upton did not win the title or scholarship. Later that year, she married Thomas George Morgan, with whom she had two daughters, Katie and Jacque.

== Career ==
In the early 1990s, when her marriage broke down, Morgan returned to school to complete a bachelor's degree in human relations at Doane College. She worked during the day at the Ponca Tribal Headquarters in Lincoln and attended school at night. Her work in the tribal office was focused on locating and repatriating remains of Ponca ancestors. In 1995, she was selected to replace Steven Provost, who had resigned from the position of executive director of the Nebraska Commission on Indian Affairs. Her appointment made her the first Ponca tribal member to hold the position. When she took over the post in October, the Omaha and Winnebago tribes were involved in a dispute over the location of a new Indian Health Service hospital. The Santee Sioux were intent upon opening a casino over the objections of the state, and the Winnebago tribe had threatened to boycott the Nebraska Indian Community College system. She was able to intercede with the Nebraska Legislature on the grounds of Santee tribal sovereignty and worked to successfully reconcile the Omaha and Winnebago leadership. She worked with the governor to establish better understanding of tribal perspectives on issues and with the legislature to improve their understanding of tribal laws.

In 1997, Morgan was honored at the YWCA Tribute to Women for her creation of a workshop to develop leadership among young Native women and her work to protect educational programs about Native culture and rights. She and her husband divorced in 1998. She graduated with a bachelor of arts degree in 2000, and went on to earn a master's degree in management from Doane College. Around the time of her graduation, Morgan married gaiashkibos, former president of the National Congress of American Indians and chair of the Lac Courte Oreilles Band of Lake Superior Chippewa Indians, who was at the time the director of the Indian Law Resource Center. In 2001, the couple participated in the United Nations World Conference against Racism in Durban, South Africa, arguing for discriminatory policies to be barred from legal codes and standing in favor of Indigenous rights and self-determination.

During her tenure as executive director of the Nebraska Commission on Indian Affairs, gaiashkibos, who serves as a liaison between the Omaha, Ponca, Santee Sioux, and Winnebago people who are headquartered in Nebraska, as well as with the tribes and the state government, has worked on many issues. She attended hearings on the Indian Child Welfare Act, and opposed removing Native children from their communities. She served on the governor's task force to end liquor sales from Whiteclay, Nebraska to the Pine Ridge Indian Reservation, where alcohol sales are banned and testified at the legislative hearing which eventually caused the liquor stores to be closed in 2017. The public health crisis created by the alcohol sales included high rates of alcoholism and violence against Native women. Part of her role with the Whiteclay Public Health Emergency Task Force was to work with the Nebraska State Patrol and local and tribal law enforcement to improve reporting and investigation of missing and murdered Native women and family violence. To create funds for a Native American scholarship aimed at tertiary students, gaiashkibos created a license plate program. The Nebraska Department of Motor Vehicles sells the plates which promote cultural and historic awareness and returns 75% of the fee to the scholarship fund.

Another focus of gaiashkibos's work has been promotion of education and the arts. She was honored with the Sower Award of the Nebraska Humanities Council in 2012. In part, the award was for her work with professor Joe Starita, funded by a Carnegie Foundation grant, to develop a curriculum called Native Daughters, a women's studies program to highlight Native women's contributions to American History. In 2016, she spearheaded a project to erect a statue of Standing Bear in the Centennial Mall at the University of Nebraska–Lincoln. The sculpture, by Benjamin Victor, was installed the following year. When gaiashkibos read that a plan was underway to replace the two statues allotted for each state at the National Statuary Hall in Washington, D.C., she contacted state Senator Tom Brewer and asked him to help her promote Standing Bear. She then contacted Victor, asking him if he would create a statue for Statuary Hall, to which he agreed. In 2018, the state legislature passed a bill to replace the sculptures in the US Capitol of William Jennings Bryan and Sterling Morton with statues of Standing Bear and novelist Willa Cather. Standing Bear's statue was installed at Statuary Hall in 2019, with gaiashkibos's daughter, Katie Brossy, an attorney attending the ceremony.

Gaiashkibos called on Victor for a third time in 2021 with a proposal to create a statue for Susan La Flesche Picotte (Omaha), the first Native woman to be credentialed as a physician in the US. Using the surplus funds from Standing Bear's statue fundraising, the sculpture was erected in the Centennial Mall at the university in October. To further honor Picotte, gaiashkibos set up a committee in 2017 of Picotte's descendants and community leaders from the Omaha people, to help plan the restoration of the hospital Picotte had founded in Walthill, Nebraska. Using funds from the United States Department of Agriculture and private funding drives, they were able to renovate the National Historic Landmark to house a medical clinic, as well as a museum and cultural center. In 2021, gaiashkibos received the Excellence in Government Achievement Award from the Lincoln Journal Star's Inspire Award program, which recognizes women's leadership, and was also the inaugural recipient of the Laurie Smith Camp Integrity in Service Award from the Omaha Bar Association. The following year, she was honored by the Lincoln chapter of Rotary International as Nebraskan of the Year, and awarded the Fulfilling the Dream Award of the University of Nebraska–Lincoln in honor of her public service.

Discovery in Canada of hundreds of unmarked graves at boarding schools sparked the US Secretary of the Interior to launch the Federal Indian Boarding School Truth Initiative. By 2022, they had identified over 500 deaths at nineteen schools. Unlike the situation in Canada where the gravesites are known but the names are not recorded, in the US the school records provided names, but the burial sites are not necessarily known. The federal study led to the formation of the Genoa Indian School Reconciliation Project, led by historians Margaret D. Jacobs, Susana D. Grajales Geliga (Sicangu Lakota-Taíno), and librarian Elizabeth Lorang. Researchers, which include gaiashkibos, discovered that students came from forty tribes and at least ten states and that the school records are incomplete, as they have identified death notices in the school newspaper. The Nebraska State Archeological Office and gaiashkibos have led the efforts to find the burial grounds of the Genoa Industrial School which operated from 1884 to 1934. Records have identified nearly ninety deaths at the school, but after the buildings were demolished the location of the cemetery was lost. Using a 1920s-era plat map, ground-penetrating radar, and cadaver dogs, the team located potential dig sites. A dig at one of the potential locations in July 2023 found no human remains.
