= Hieronimo =

Literature character

Hieronimo is one of the principal characters in Thomas Kyd's The Spanish Tragedy. He is the knight marshal of Spain and the father of Horatio. In the onset of the play he is a dedicated servant to the King of Spain. However, the difference in social status becomes apparent when his son is wrongfully murdered by Balthazar, the son of the viceroy of Portugal, and Lorenzo, the son of the Duke of Spain, which eventually causes tragic events to unfold. In order to revenge the death of his son, Hieronimo takes on additional roles, a playwright and an actor. He uses his position in the King's court to write and perform a play within a play. This performance mirrors the actual events surrounding Horatio's death, and within this show Hieronimo commits his own acts of revenge against the perpetrators. Many critics see Hieronimo as a dynamic character that by the end of the tragedy has become obsessed with taking revenge against the murderers of his son. Literature of 16th century England was greatly concerned with plots of deceit, confusion and madness as its central theme. The Spanish Tragedy is no different.

== The character of Hieronimo ==
In Peter B. Murray's Thomas Kyd, he has his own summary and analysis of Hieronimo in The Spanish Tragedy. The author mostly dwells on the analysis of Hieronimo's play within a play. Murray emphasizes that the play is about how in the end love will kill and how the characters in the play were acting the opposite parts of their true selves; their acting roles did not reflect their true character. Murray also points out that Hieronimo seems to be delaying the revenge cycle throughout his play. "At several points in the play it might appear that Hieronimo delays revenge, Hamlet-style, but there is no invitation to deep psychological analysis of the delay". He is trying to prolong it as much as possible to get his point across and make sure that the audience truly knows whom each character is supposed to represent in real life. He feels compelled to destroy every one in his path by showing how they killed his son that he forgets to think about what he is actually doing and do everything with caution.

Hieronimo's intentions may make sense and seem right and just in his mind, but he is letting his need for revenge cloud what is really happening around him. He is letting the play define what revenge means to him, "a force sent from the underworld when the judges fail, a demonic urge that promises a perverse 'joy amidst ... discontent'". His characters in his play within a play get carried away with the roles that they are acting that they end up getting themselves killed just like their characters die in the script.

Hieronimo even suggests that the play be spoken in different languages. "As a result, each character will be isolated from the others within a language that he alone speaks, as they have been isolated by false use of language all along". He has two meanings behind this thought. One is so he himself will be able to explain what the play was about in hopes of furthering his need for revenge. The other is to cause drama to represent a revenge symbol with the fall of Babel. "By imagining Spain to be Babylon and by making the villains of his playlet be Turks, Hieronimo reinforces his earlier idea that heaven is at work in his revenge". Therefore, Hieronimo thinks that this allows him to play the murderer. He envisions himself to be "God's agent for the punishment of a whole nation" consequently letting him think that there is no need for him to differentiate between the innocent and the guilty.

In "The Spanish Tragedy, The Alencon Marriage Plans, and John Stubbs's Discoverie of a Gaping Gulf", by Andrew Hadfield, the plausibility of how the King had no idea that Horatio was murdered is brought up. "The King alone seems unaware that Horatio is dead; an extremely implausible situation." Hadfield mentions that when this scene took place Hieronimo was hoping that the king would give justice to whoever killed his son. It is clear at this point the state of mind that Hieronimo is in when he throws the halter toward the entrance of all of the nobles. He is obviously not in the right state of mind anymore and the death of his son has really taken a toll on his mental health.

Hadfield raises a good point when he says that "There is a mismatch between the needs of the state and the desires of the individuals within it, a situation that has tragic results when Hieronimo stages his deadly play to complete the cycle of revenge". Because the king is ignorant of the point that Hieronimo is so obviously trying to get across, he is in turn putting the "demands of foreign policy above those of its citizens". Similarly to what Murray thought, Hadfield also agrees that because the thought of revenge is so strong in the minds of the characters, the real issue is clouded and what does not need to be a tragic end becomes one.

=== Hieronimo: victim or murderer? ===
For critics, the actions of Hieronimo in the final scenes of the play have been somewhat controversial. According to author Frank R. Ardolino, at the conclusion of Hieronimo's play of vengeance, there are two possible moral perspectives for the audience to take. "We can condemn him according to the New Testament prohibition of private revenge; on the other hand we can exonerate him from the viewpoint of a pagan code of justice which sanctions just revenge". Ardolino believes that Thomas Kyd intended for his audience to take the second viewpoint; that Hieronimo is a "morally justified private revenger ...". He comes to this conclusion through the claim that Kyd indicates this by "the epilogue, which presents the apotheosis of Hieronimo and his accomplice, Bel-imperia, as well as Horatio and Isabella, in the pagan underworld". In addition to this, the development of Don Andrea and Revenge, and the final decision of the gods of the underworld to "consign Andrea's apportionment of final rewards and punishments" reveal that the pagan view on revenge should be taken. Basically, because there is so much representation of paganism in the play, it is only natural to conclude this.

Over time, critic's views have changed on this issue. Initially, many thought that the role of Don Andrea was nothing more than another example of bloody revenge. However, "modern critics of the past two decades have concluded that there are important connections between the opening scene and the play proper". Don Andrea and Hieronimo are eternally connected through their want of vengeance against Lorenzo and Balthazar. "Once we [Andrea and we as a collective theater audience] recognize that this is why he has been back to earth, then we can understand why the prince is doomed to die and how his death satisfies Hieronimo's personal vengeance and fulfills pagan justice". According to Ardolino, Kyd makes a point to his audience through the onstage presence of Revenge that Andrea has been allowed to "return to earth with the embodiment of pagan justice to witness the enforcement of a just vengeance against his murderers".

Ardolino concludes that through being an outside viewer of what is taking place in the Spanish court, Don Andrea learns to "equate Hieronimo's quest for a just revenge with the reasons for his return to earth". As the grief-stricken father who seeks to take justice against his son's murderers, "Hieronimo becomes a surrogate for Andrea, and when he accomplishes his vengeance and satisfies pagan justice as well, Andrea's search for a just revenge is also completed". In short, Don Andrea's desire for revenge against Prince Balthazar is finally fulfilled through Hieronimo's actions.

Critic David Laird also tends to agree with Ardolino's point of view. According to him the dilemma that Hieronimo finds himself in opens "an abrupt and dramatically effective contrast between the Christian ideal of patience and humility and the classical-pagan concept of honor". After the initial discovering of Horatio's murderers, Hieronimo, as the knight marshal, first turns to the King and the instituted system of justice for help. However, "when that preferred and sanctioned way is blocked for him by the calculating efforts of his enemies, Hieronimo is forced to choose between alternatives neither one of which is wholly acceptable to him". Those two alternatives being to actively seek his own private justice or for him to retreat and to allow the Christian concept of "divine promise of eventual justice" to run its course. Although we know that Hieronimo chooses the former alternative, it is not without hesitation.

Vindicta mihi! Ay, heaven will be revenged of every ill, Nor will they suffer murder unrepaid: Then stay, Hieronimo, attend their will, For mortal men may not appoint their time.

Hieronimo says these words prior to his act of vengeance. In the article, Laird explains Hieronimo's thought process. "The logical crux of Hieronimo's argument is an implicit hypothetical proposition: If vengeance belongs to God, then men who seek vengeance must defer to the will of God". Ultimately, Laird concludes that Hieronimo is unable to escape the responsibility of what happened to his son, Horatio. He fears that if revenge is not brought upon Balthazar and Lorenzo they will continue to commit similar crimes in order to secure themselves and their positions. "Hieronimo implies that while men are kept from seeking justice by a fear of death, not to seek justice is to invite certain death". Laird believes that Hieronimo's actions were not motivated by sheer anger or madness, but rather "a clear-headed deliberation". Once Hieronimo makes up his mind and determines his plans, he does not waver.

=== Hieronimo vs. Shakespeare's Prince Hamlet ===
Critic Michael Henry Levin draws many comparisons between Kyd's Hieronimo and Shakespeare's Hamlet. Firstly, he believes that Thomas Kyd's drama is much simpler than Shakespeare's, and that it is this simplicity that opens the doors for the audience to truly see the "furies that drive his characters". Hieronimo, like Prince Hamlet who has lost his father, has a deep love for a certain member of his immediate family-his son Horatio. However, according to Levin, Hieronimo holds a much clearer perspective on the situation at hand. Both characters are torn up with grief over the news of the unjust murder committed against their family member, but Hieronimo is able to maintain control over his emotions and not allow them to cloud his motivations throughout the majority of the play. "He may momentarily be weary of life, but he is never plunged into melancholic apathy for long" like Hamlet is. In act IV.v 16–18 of The Spanish Tragedy Hieronimo says, "This way or that way? Soft and fair, not so. For if I hang or kill myself, let's know who will revenge Horatio's murder then?" Also like Hamlet, Hieronimo is thrust without a choice into the role of the revenge hero, and "he channels his emotions into what becomes the duty of revenge".

Levin also notes some important differences between the two protagonists. Unlike Hamlet, Hieronimo is not informed of the identity of the person who murdered his beloved son. Therefore, he must "discover the proper objects of vengeance before he can avenge". In addition to this, Hieronimo also has a very distinct sense of right and wrong. Because he is the knight marshal to the King of Spain he has dedicated much of his life to the enforcement of the law. At first he wants the murderers of his son to be punished by due process unlike Hamlet's vision of bloody revenge. "I will go plain me to my lord the King, and cry aloud for justice through the court, "says Hieronimo. Thirdly, Hieronimo never considers suicide as an option like Hamlet does. According to Levin, "revenge, not suicide, is always uppermost in his mind". Finally, the difference between Hieronimo and Hamlet that Levin views as the most important is unlike Hamlet, Hieronimo seems to be in nearly complete control of his emotions in the face of his enemies. "Hieronimo remains master of his emotions until his vengeance is complete ... he is never rash enough to alarm his intended victims, and he eventually deceives them so thoroughly that they embrace him as a friend". On the other hand, Hamlet acts very spontaneously throughout the play and borders between the line of sanity and craziness. "His self-criticisms are seldom triggered by inner motivation, and it takes external objects to rouse him from the gloomy lassitude which is his normal state of being in the play" says Levin of Prince Hamlet's behavior. He often makes excuses for his inability to act. For example, in Hamlet's soliloquy at the end of act II.ii, he compares himself to the actor and how he himself pales in comparison to that player. In lines 577–580, Hamlet says, "O, what a rogue and peasant slave am I! Is it not monstrous that this player here, But in a fiction, in a dream of passion, Could force his soul so his own conceit ..." He ultimately only takes action because his Uncle Claudius leaves him no choice.
