= Nebraska Commission on Indian Affairs =

Nebraska state government agency

The Nebraska Commission on Indian Affairs is a state commission, appointed by the Governor of Nebraska to defend the interest of Indigenous peoples and cultures in the State of Nebraska. The current executive director is Judi gaiashkibos.

The commission was founded in 1971, with representatives from the Omaha, Winnebago and Santee tribes as well those based in Omaha, Lincoln and the Nebraska Panhandle.

== Work ==
The commission makes representations to government bodies or the wider public, in the interest of Indigenous peoples. It also operates outreach programmes for members of the Indigenous communities. and preserves cultural artefacts.
