= Cornelia (play) =

Play about Cornelia Metella

- Original language: English
- Written by: Thomas Kyd
- Subject: Roman history
- Genre: Tragedy
- Setting: Rome

Premiere
- Date: 1573

Cornelia or Pompey the Great, his Fair Cornelia's Tragedy is a 1590 play by Thomas Kyd. The play is about Cornelia Metella, the widow of Pompey. The play ends with Pompey's death and the reactions from his family. Julius Caesar does not appear in person but has a presence throughout. It is an English language adaptation of Robert Garnier's play Cornélie from 1573.
