= Bel-imperia =

Bel-imperia is a character in Thomas Kyd's The Spanish Tragedy. She is the daughter of the Duke of Castile, the sister of Lorenzo, and the lover of the dead Don Andrea. Throughout the play, Bel-imperia attempts to avenge the death of Don Andrea. She begins by feigning a relationship with Horatio to "spite the prince that wrought his end", then joins forces with Hieronimo to eventually murder Balthazar and complete her revenge mission. However, critics view Bel-imperia in various roles based on her actions throughout the play.

== Roles ==
=== Bel-imperia as the revenger ===
Bel-imperia in Thomas Kyd's Spanish Tragedy has been viewed in numerous ways. As one can see in Richard Madelaines' article on the transgression and its punishment on the modern English stage, one can see Bel-imperia as a sexual temptress. His essay discusses how Bel-imperia breaks free of traditional feminine roles to exact her revenge. Early dialogue in this essay suggests that Bel-imperia exemplifies the ancient feministic model; as she mourns the loss of the Andrea. Her later actions undermine the role of feminine passivity. Madelaines' interpretation focuses on her relationship with Horatio. "A bold Bel-imperia leading Horatio on (partly by necessity, since her social rank is so much higher than his) and the love talk animated by gesture, in ways that the dialogue makes explicit. Here, and in other scenes of the kind where there is less textual sexual explicitness." As we see here, a brave Bel-imperia leads Horatio away, and tells her of her love for him. Madelaines' essay delves into how Bel-imperia uses Horatio to revenge her lost love. She uses her class and beauty to seduce Horatio, in an effort to make Balthazar jealous. Her seduction of Horatio will eventually lead to his brutal execution. "The would-be lover is stabbed at the height of his sexual ambition; the fruits of desire are wounds, a bloodletting that cools what is overheated, purges what is infected". Classical women were passive, and they were supposed to helpless. As we know Bel-imperia exacts her revenge, and successfully revenges Andrea. Thus we see that Richard Madelaine views Bel-imperia as a protagonist, because of her active role in the plot.

=== Bel-imperia as the passionate revenger ===
Michael Henry Levin's view of Bel-imperia as a revenger is similar to Madelaine's. However Levin focuses on Bel-imperia's passion as her driving force, instead of her class and sexual appeal. He believes "Bel-imperia is as imperious as her brother—she chooses her lovers, woos them, and sleeps with them regardless of their social position—but she reveals a depth of feeling that Lorenzo never shows." Levin states that Bel-imperia adds depth to the play with the devotion and passion she ascribes to all activities, whether loving or avenging. "When she loves, she will not relinquish love (the secret meetings with Andrea, Induction 5–11), and when she avenges, she is dedicated to vengeance with an intensity that refuses to be denied." Bel-imperia's dedication to avenge is first hinted at in Act I, Scene II, when she begins the Horatio affair, and "she finishes with a passion so strong that we are forced to give her the benefit of the doubt." Even though she is under surveillance, she still continues to avenge Don Andrea's death by sending the letter to Hieronimo "immediately, instinctively, without hesitation, doubt, or fear." And, she completes her revenge quite successfully; "[i]t is Bel-imperia who scorns Andrea's slayer… and whose second love prompts the chain of events that enables her to avenge her first." Therefore, it is Bel-imperia who drives the plot, assumes the role of revenger, and successfully completes her mission. Even though revenge qualities are typically attributed the male characters, Levin believes that Bel-imperia's revenging techniques create her femininity: "mercurial and melancholic, amorous, clever, coy, and scornful by turns, she is the eternal female—and her femininity has iron in its soul."

=== Bel-imperia as the Aristocratic victim ===
In contrast, Katharine Eisaman Maus portrays Bel-imperia as a victim of the various revenge plots, but also as a character defined by her social class. Due to Lorenzo's Machiavellian revenge plot against Horatio, Bel-imperia "is forced into a dynastically advantageous wedding to a man she abhors." Bel-imperia is further victimized when Lorenzo refuses to acknowledge her loyalty to Don Andrea when forming his Machiavellian revenge plots. Eisaman Maus argues that Lorenzo continues to underestimate Bel-imperia's loyalty and desire for revenge, "once Bel-imperia is hustled out of the way, Lorenzo assumes they need no longer be feared." The male protagonists not only underestimate characteristics inherent to Bel-imperia, but they little trust in her abilities. Maus discuses that Bel-imperia's intelligence and honesty are belittled when Hieronimo does not believe her letter is truthful, and instead of taking immediate action, lets the revenge plots continue to progress. Hieronimo continues to repress Bel-imperia, even as she completes her revenge, by "violently" silencing her in his revenge production. Eisaman Maus abandons the victim idea to encompass one of the main ideas of the play: the social class of the characters. Throughout The Spanish Tragedy, Kyd identifies the class differences in the characters and creates class conflict. Bel-imperia, an aristocrat, upholds the class conflict because she wants to avenge the death of Don Andrea, a middle-class man. Despite Bel-imperia's willingness to cross the barriers for love, Eisaman Maus declares that Bel-imperia maintains her aristocratic status with her revenge techniques: "both her boldness and her calculating use of inferiors are thoroughly aristocratic qualities." Despite victimization by the male protagonists, Bel-imperia victimizes those of the lower classes to complete her revenge mission.

=== Bel-imperia as the victim ===
Like Eisaman Maus, Steven Justice views Bel-imperia as a victim of the male protagonists, but does not focus on her social class. In his critique of the Spanish Tragedy, he points out that mercy is a word which is not used once throughout the play. Bel-imperia is viewed in Justices' work as much more of a victim. The play begins with the murder of her lover Andrea. She is again seen as a victim when she is left out of Lorenzo's revenge plots. Though we know of her love and loyalty to Andrea, others doubt it. She is forced to marry Balthazar, her lover's murderer by her father, the duke of Castile. Though Justice points out that she isn't seen as particularly weak, just unfortunate. "Once Horatio is dead Bel-imperia cannot use romance as a form of retaliation. Imprisoned by Lorenzo in her father's house, all she can do is write a letter with her blood to Hieronimo. She has been confined to a role like Andrea's, urging others to act on her behalf." He believes this is because she is seen as cold and calculating throughout the plot, in seeking revenge on Balthazar. He also points out how she is spurned by Hieronimo, as he doesn't believer her letter and fails to take immediate action. Bel-imperia becomes the victim yet again, as the justice system fails her. She is forced to taker Balthazar's life, and then her own. Justice believes that Bel-imperia is the ultimate victim, as she loses both of her lovers (Andrea, and Horatio), and eventually her own life.

=== Bel-imperia as the sexual temptress ===
Duncan Salkeld believes that Bel-imperia is not a victim, but rather the female protagonist who uses sex appeal to tempt the male protagonists into her revenge plot. He, like Levin, believes she is a revenger; however Salkeld believes Bel-imperia's weapon is her sex appeal, not her passion and determination. His views are also supported by Madelaine, as both focus on her use of sexual powers to complete the revenge. Salkeld supports other editors who have focused on "the foxiness of her character, as though she were a female Machiavel." Salkeld cites Act II, Scene IV to further his argument: "Horatio is mildly surprised yet pleased to discover that Bel-imperia is not only acquainted with the arts of enticement, but can take the initiative too." He continues, "Bel-imperia's lead in these stichomythic courtesies, taking Horatio in her embrace, accords with the eroticism of the metaphor of a vine entwined around an elm." However, the audience is well aware that Bel-imperia has no interest in Horatio, and is simply using him to complete her revenge plot because she is still loyal to Don Andrea. After Horatio is murdered, "her sexual vitality becomes a joke between the Viceroy and Castile" as they insinuate that Lorenzo is victim to Bel-imperia's powerful allure. When Bel-imperia commits suicide, her various roles as temptress, "from Andrea's secret mistress and Horatio's Venus, to her role in Hieronimo's tragedy as the 'chaste and resolute' Perseda, lover to Erasto", terminate abruptly. Yet, "throughout each of these representations, her sensuality has proved compelling for the male protagonists of the Spanish court." Salkeld defines Bel-imperia as a sexual, female temptress who entices the male characters of the play in order to successfully execute her revenge plot.

== Gender and politics ==
Bel-imperia's role in The Spanish Tragedy is important socially as well as politically. Her femininity proves important as well, as a female character has a very different impact on her surrounding events than a male. Both her advantages and disadvantages from being a female are essential in Kyd's revenge tragedy. Some critics have chosen to focus on the disadvantages she has, and present Bel-imperia mainly as a victim. Some of the many other effects that her femininity has are pointed out by Sharon D. Voros in her article, "Feminine Symbols of Empire in Thomas Kyd and Pedro Calderon: The Spanish Tragedy and De un Castigo Tres Venganzas." Bel-imperia defends the Empire, which is defined by Voros as a political subsystem. Her name is fitting to her role which means "the beauty of empire or conquest". She is also a defender of peace and political harmony against the threats it may face, and represents beauty and femininity. Voros says that it is Bel-imperia who gets the actions of the revenge plot started, and her character's presence is essential to the understanding of the play's political concepts.

In spite of the view that Bel-imperia is the savior of the Empire, Voros state that she can also be seen as "destructive and dangerous." This view differs from that taken by another critics. While Bel-imperia is described by Maus and Justice as a victim, Voros approaches the subject from a different angle. There is a connection between seduction, women, and Bel-imperia in particular that supports the view of this darker purpose that the female role has in the play. In connection to this Voros says, "The violence directed toward women ends up eliminating the male character." This shows how the female role have a deep impact and can completely turn the play around. Voros makes a point about the suppression of feminine discourse. She points out that in order to get the proper and desired revenge, Bel-imperia keeps silent when necessary. There are different ways of interpreting Bel-imperia's silence. While some have claimed that it demeans and victimizes her, it can also be seen as the contrary. Keeping quiet shows that Bel-imperia is not only a self-disciplined character, but also hints of intelligence as she plans and conspires the plot.

Voros concludes that the role of women in revenge plays is complicated, and intertwines multiple factors of society. She claims that Bel-imperia uses her beauty to manipulate those around her, turning the suppressed female role to her own advantage. In contrast, her presence is also associated with the good government and the common good. Throughout the play she shows these qualities on several occasions. One of the most powerful times she does this is at the very end of the play. In the play-within-a-play, Bel-imperia is playing the character Perseda. She bravely stabs herself rather than having to act immoral and ignoble. Since this portion of the play is a reflection of the plot of the entire play, and the stabbing is real, Bel-imperia is not merely playing a character who possesses these qualities. The character she plays is a reflection of herself and Bel-imperia has the same traits that Perseda has, namely courage and faithfulness to her principles.

== The impact of language ==
The wording and literal effects used in any play clearly impacts how we perceive the play in general. It may also impact how we view the various characters in the play and alter the perception we have of them. An analysis of these effects and methods has been done by Carol McGinnis Kay in, "Deception Through Words: A Reading of The Spanish Tragedy." One of Kay's main focuses is how Bel-imperia's words do not seem to have much credibility. Lorenzo and the Spanish King both agree that Bel-imperia is lying to them, and that she "does not mean what she says." This mistrust in Bel-imperia is interpreted by critics to be demeaning. The impression given by Kay on the other hand, is that Bel-imperia expects and accepts the response she gets. It is part of her plan to be deceiving. Being mistrusted does not pose any major threat to her integrity as her goal is to get the desired revenge, not to acquire external praise and glory.

Bel-imperia manipulates the truth on several occasions, one of them being the first scene with Horatio. During this scene she tells Horatio one thing and the audience another, as pointed out by Kay. In this particular scene (Act I, Scene IV) Bel-imperia says, "She [referring to herself] will be Don Horatio's thankful friend," directly to Horatio. Then when Horatio has left she reveals that "I'll love Horatio…the more to spite the prince." Clearly she leads Horatio to believe that their relationship is based on other values than what it actually is to her.

Bel-imperia not only lies directly, but also pretends to believe things she does not. Kay claims that there is only a single scene where Bel-imperia communicates genuinely, and that everything else is pretend, lies and hypocrisy. She refers to Bel-imperia as being, "hidden behind a verbal mask." The expression is well fitting to Bel-imperia and her lack of proper communication.

== Sources ==
Books

- Kyd, Thomas (1989) [1970]. James Ronald Mulryne (ed.). The Spanish Tragedy (2nd ed.). New York: W. W. Norton. ISBN 0-393-90057-6. OCLC 477137455.
- Simkin, Stevie; Katharine Eisaman Maus (2001). "The Spanish Tragedy, or, the Machiavel's Revenge". Revenge Tragedy. New York, NY: Palgrave. pp. 55–71. ISBN 0-333-92237-9. OCLC 45446520.

Journals

- Justice, Steven (1985). "Spain, Tragedy, and The Spanish Tragedy". SEL: Studies in English Literature 1500–1900. 25 (2): 271–288. doi:10.2307/450723. ISSN 0039-3657. JSTOR 450723. OCLC 484131532.
- Levin, Michael Henry (1964). ""Vindicta Mihi!": Meaning, Morality, and Motivation in The Spanish Tragedy". SEL: Studies in English Literature 1500–1900. 4 (2). St. Louis, Missouri: Saint Louis University, Pius XI Library: 307–324. doi:10.2307/449629. ISSN 0039-3657. JSTOR 449629. OCLC 484095279.
- Madelaine, Richard (January 2005). "The Dark and Vicious Place: The Location of Sexual Transgression and its Punishment on the Early Modern English Stage". Parergon. 22 (1). Australian and New Zealand Association of Medieval and Early Modern Studies: 159–183. doi:10.1353/pgn.2005.0042. ISSN 0313-6221. OCLC 4639325662.
- McGinnis Kay, Carol (January 1977). "Deception through Words: A Reading of "The Spanish Tragedy"". Studies in Philology. 74 (1). University of North Carolina Press: 20–38. ISSN 0039-3738. OCLC 484362420.
- Salkeld, Duncan (2000). "Kyd and the Courtesan". Notes and Queries. 47 (1). London: Oxford University Press: 43–48. doi:10.1093/nq/47.1.43. ISSN 0029-3970. OCLC 94316827.
- Voros, Sharon D. (September 1992). "Feminine Symbols of Empire in Thomas Kyd and Pedro Calderón: "The Spanish Tragedy" and "De un Castigo Tres Venganzas"". Pacific Coast Philology. 27 (1/2). Pacific Ancient and Modern Language Association: 145–158. doi:10.2307/1316722. ISSN 0078-7469. JSTOR 1316722. OCLC 478289306.
