= Thomas Kyd =

English dramatist (1558-1594)

Thomas Kyd (1558-1594) was an English playwright, the author of The Spanish Tragedy, and one of the most important figures in the development of Elizabethan drama.

== Early life ==
Thomas Kyd was the son of Francis and Anna Kyd. No birth records have been discovered, but he was baptized in St Mary Woolnoth in the ward of Langborn, Lombard Street, London on 6 November 1558. The baptismal register the church carries this entry: "Thomas, son of Francis Kydd, Citizen and Writer of the Courte Letter of London".

In October 1565, Kyd was enrolled in the new Merchant Taylors' School, whose headmaster was Richard Mulcaster. Fellow students included Edmund Spenser and Thomas Lodge. Kyd received a well-rounded education, with the curriculum including Italian, Latin, Greek, music, drama, physical education, and "good manners". There is no evidence that Kyd went on to university.

Francis Kyd was a scrivener and in 1580 was warden of the Scriveners' Company. Thomas may have followed in his father's footsteps due to similar scrivener handwriting style in two letters written by him.

== Career ==
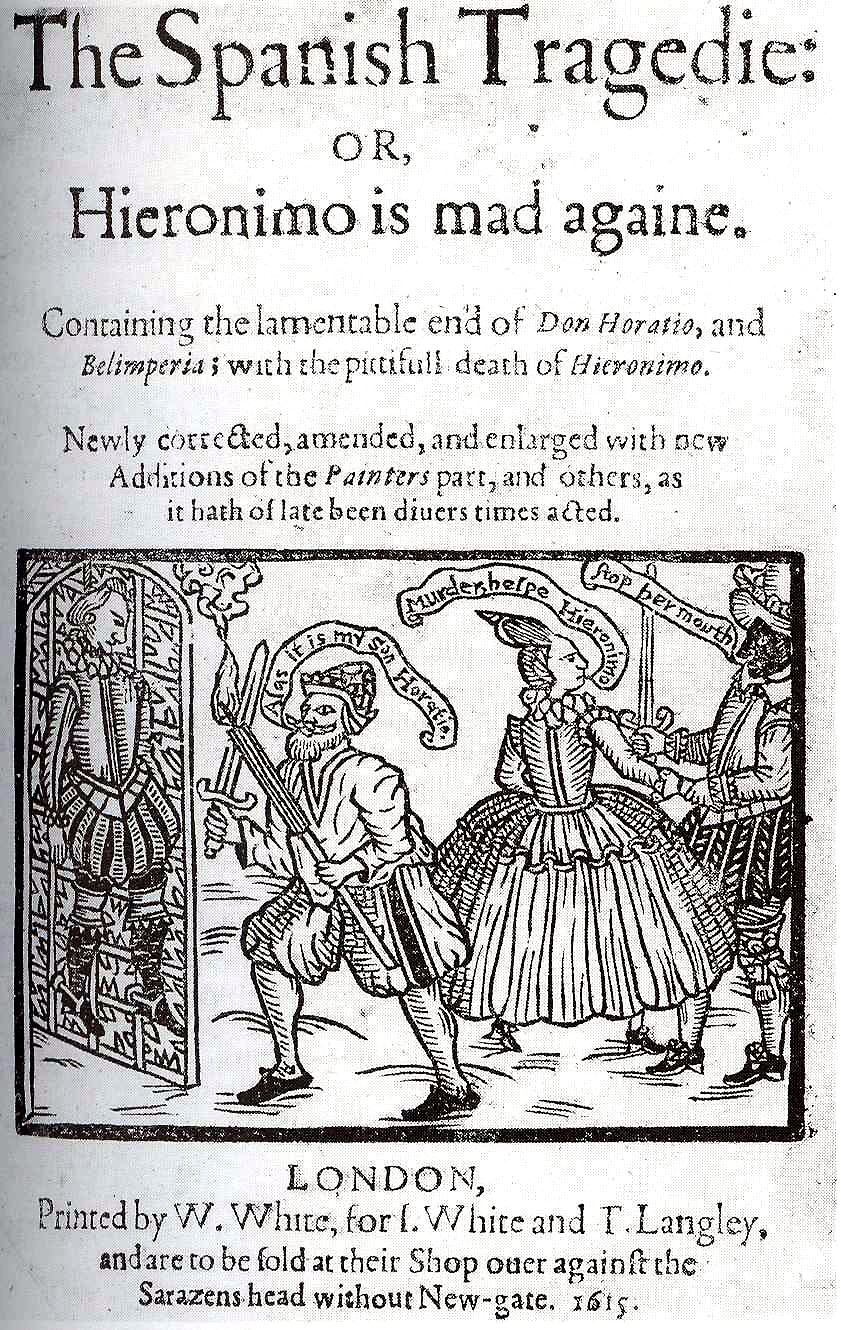
Title page of Kyd's The Spanish Tragedy, with a woodcut showing (left) the hung body of Horatio discovered by (centre) Hieronymo; and Bel-imperia being taken from the scene by a blackface Lorenzo (right).

Evidence suggests that in the 1580s, Kyd became an important playwright. Francis Meres placed him among "our best for tragedy" and Heywood elsewhere called him "Famous Kyd". Ben Jonson mentions him in the same breath as Christopher Marlowe (with whom, in London, Kyd at one time shared a room) and John Lyly in the Shakespeare First Folio.

The Spanish Tragedy was probably written in the mid-to-late 1580s, with its first recorded performance on 23 February 1592 by Lord Strange's Men. The earliest surviving edition was printed in 1592, the full title being The Spanish Tragedie, Containing the lamentable end of Don Horatio, and Bel-imperia: with the pittifull death of olde Hieronimo. The play was usually known simply as "Hieronimo" after the protagonist. It was arguably the most popular play of the "Age of Shakespeare", setting new standards in plot construction and character development. There were "twenty-nine performances between 1592 and 1597" and "eleven editions between 1592 and 1633", which historian J. R. Mulryne states is "a tally unequaled by any of the plays of Shakespeare". In 1602, a version of the play with "additions" was published. Philip Henslowe's diary records payment to Ben Jonson for additions that year, but it is disputed whether the published additions reflect Jonson's work or if they were composed for a 1597 revival of The Spanish Tragedy mentioned by Henslowe.

Other works by Kyd are his translations of Torquato Tasso's Padre di Famiglia, published as The Householder's Philosophy (1588) and of Robert Garnier's Cornélie (1594), along with the play Soliman and Perseda. Plays attributed, without consensus, in whole or in part, to Kyd include King Leir, Fair Em, Arden of Faversham and parts of 1 Henry VI and Edward III. A play related to The Spanish Tragedy called The First Part of Hieronimo (surviving in a quarto of 1605) may be a bad quarto or memorial reconstruction of a play by Kyd, or it may be an inferior writer's burlesque of The Spanish Tragedy inspired by that play's popularity.

The success of Kyd's plays extended to Europe. Versions of The Spanish Tragedy were popular in Germany and the Netherlands for generations. The influence of these plays on European drama was largely the reason for the interest in Kyd among German scholars in the nineteenth century.

== Later life ==
From 1587 to 1593, Kyd was in the service of an unidentified noble, since, after his imprisonment in 1593, he wrote of having lost "the favours of my Lord, whom I haue servd almost theis vi yeres nowe". Proposed nobles include the Earl of Sussex, the Earl of Pembroke, Lord Strange. and Edward De Vere, 17th Earl of Oxford. He may have worked as a secretary, if he did not also write plays. Around 1591 Christopher Marlowe also joined this patron's service, sharing lodgings and ideas.

On 11 May 1593, the Privy Council ordered the arrest of the authors of "divers lewd and mutinous libels," which had been posted around London. One libel was found on the property of a Dutch Church, containing violent anti-foreigner sentiments and allusions to the works of Marlowe. The next day, Kyd was among those arrested; he would later believe that he had been the victim of an informer. His lodgings were searched and instead of evidence of the "libels" there was found an Arianist tract, described by an investigator as "vile heretical conceits denying the eternal deity of Jesus Christ found amongst the papers of Thos. Kydd [sic], prisoner...which he affirmeth he had from C. Marley [sic]". Historians such as Frederick Boas believe that Kyd was tortured to obtain this information. Kyd told authorities the writings found in his possession belonged to Christopher Marlowe, a fellow dramatist and former roommate. Kyd "accused his former roommate of being a blasphemous traitor, an atheist who believed that Jesus Christ was a homosexual", an uninformed confusion over the Arian and early Gnostic concept of homoousios. Following the accusation, Marlowe was summoned by the Privy Council, and while waiting for a decision on his case, he was killed in an incident in Deptford involving government agents.

Kyd was eventually released but was not accepted back into his lord's service. Believing he was under suspicion of atheism, he wrote to the Lord Keeper, Sir John Puckering, protesting his innocence; his efforts to clear his name were fruitless. The last instance of Kyd is the publication of Cornelia early in 1594. In the dedication to the Countess of Sussex he alludes to the "bitter times and privy broken passions" he had endured. Kyd died later that year, and was buried on 15 August 1594 in St Mary Colechurch in London. In December of that year, Kyd's mother legally renounced the administration of his debt-ridden estate.

In 1666, St Mary Colechurch was destroyed in the Great Fire of London and not rebuilt.

Kyd fell into obscurity until 1773 when Thomas Hawkins, an early editor of The Spanish Tragedy, discovered that Thomas Heywood, in his Apologie for Actors (1612) attributed the play to Kyd. A hundred years later, scholars in Germany and England began to shed light on his life and work, including the controversial finding that he may have been the author of a Hamlet play before Shakespeare's, which is now known as the Ur-Hamlet.

== Works ==
The dates of composition are approximate.

- Don Horatio (partially extant in The First Part of Hieronimo, c. 1586)
- The Spanish Tragedy (c. 1587)
- The Householder's Philosophy (translation, 1588)
- Solyman and Perseda (attributed, 1588)
- King Leir (attributed, 1589)
- Arden of Faversham (attributed, 1590)
- Fair Em (attributed, 1590)
- Henry VI, Part 1 (attributed, with William Shakespeare, 1592)
- The Murder of John Brewen (pamphlet, 1592)
- Edward III (attributed, with William Shakespeare, 1593)
- Cornelia (translation of Robert Garnier, 1594)
